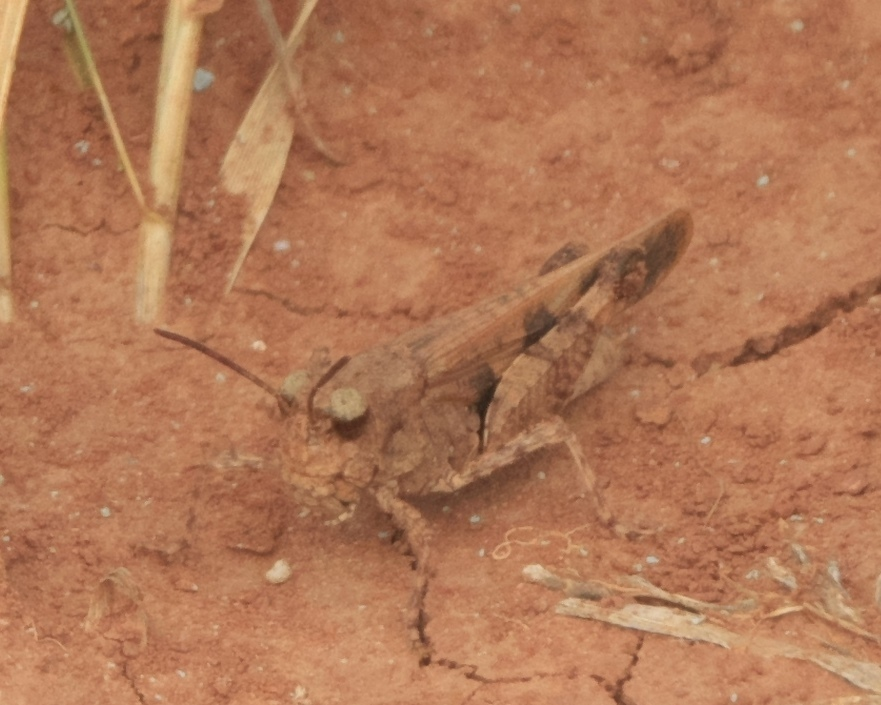
- In Oklahoma, USA

Scientific classification
- Kingdom: Animalia
- Phylum: Arthropoda
- Clade: Pancrustacea
- Class: Insecta
- Order: Orthoptera
- Suborder: Caelifera
- Family: Acrididae
- Subfamily: Oedipodinae
- Tribe: Chortophagini
- Genus: Nebulatettix
- Species: N. subgracilis

Binomial name
- Nebulatettix subgracilis (Caudell, 1903)

= Nebulatettix subgracilis =

Species of band-winged grasshopper

Nebulatettix subgracilis, commonly known as the southwestern dusky grasshopper, is a species of band-winged grasshopper in the family Acrididae. It is found in North America.
