= Nebulatettix pallidus =

Scientific classification
- Kingdom: Animalia
- Phylum: Arthropoda
- Clade: Pancrustacea
- Class: Insecta
- Order: Orthoptera
- Suborder: Caelifera
- Family: Acrididae
- Subfamily: Oedipodinae
- Tribe: Chortophagini
- Genus: Nebulatettix
- Species: N. pallidus

Binomial name
- Nebulatettix pallidus (Bruner, 1893)

Species of band-winged grasshopper

Nebulatettix pallidus is a species of band-winged grasshopper in the family Acrididae. It is found in western North America.
