= Pusa (disambiguation) =

Pusa is a genus of earless seal.

Pusa or PUSA may also refer to:

== Music ==
- The Presidents of the United States of America (band), a rock band
- The Presidents of the United States of America (album), the band's self-titled debut album
- PUSA Inc., a record label founded by The Presidents of the United States of America
- "Pusa Road", a section of "Fire Garden Suite", a song by Steve Vai from his 1996 album Fire Garden
- Pusa, a Czech folk rock band

== Organizations ==
- Pusa Polytechnic - a technology school in India
- Institute of Hotel Management, Delhi or IHM Pusa, in Pusa, Delhi, India
- Indian Agricultural Research Institute (IARI), situated in Pusa, Delhi, also known as Pusa Institute
- Pokémon USA Inc, the American branch of The Pokémon Company
- PUSA – Persatuan Ulama Seluruh Aceh (All Aceh Religious Scholars Association) established by Daud Beureu'eh in 1939

== Places ==
- Pusa, Sarawak, a town in Malaysia.
- Pusa, a block in Samastipur district, Bihar, India
- Pusa, a neighborhood of New Delhi, India
  - Pusa Road, road in New Delhi
- Khudiram Bose Pusa railway station, a railway station in Samastipur district, Bihar, India

== People ==
- Marko Pusa, a Finnish darts player

== Other uses ==
- President of the United States, the head of state and government of the United States of America
- Pusa, a synonym for Pusana, a for a grasshopper genus
- Guanyin or Bodhisattva, known in Chinese as pusa
- Pausha or Pusa, a month in the Hindu calendar (December–January)
