= Tomonotus ferruginosus =

Scientific classification
- Domain: Eukaryota
- Kingdom: Animalia
- Phylum: Arthropoda
- Class: Insecta
- Order: Orthoptera
- Suborder: Caelifera
- Family: Acrididae
- Tribe: Arphiini
- Genus: Tomonotus
- Species: T. ferruginosus

Binomial name
- Tomonotus ferruginosus Bruner, 1905

Species of grasshopper

Tomonotus ferruginosus, the oak-leaf grasshopper, is a species of band-winged grasshopper in the family Acrididae. It is found in Central America and North America.
