= Rashidia =

Scientific classification
- Domain: Eukaryota
- Kingdom: Animalia
- Phylum: Arthropoda
- Class: Insecta
- Order: Orthoptera
- Suborder: Caelifera
- Family: Acrididae
- Genus: Rashidia; Uvarov, 1933
- Species: R. perplexa

Binomial name
- Rashidia perplexa Uvarov, 1933

Genus of grasshoppers

Rashidia is a monotypic genus of grasshoppers in the subfamily Oedipodinae, erected by Boris Uvarov in 1933 and containing the species Rashidia perplexa, found in Oman.
