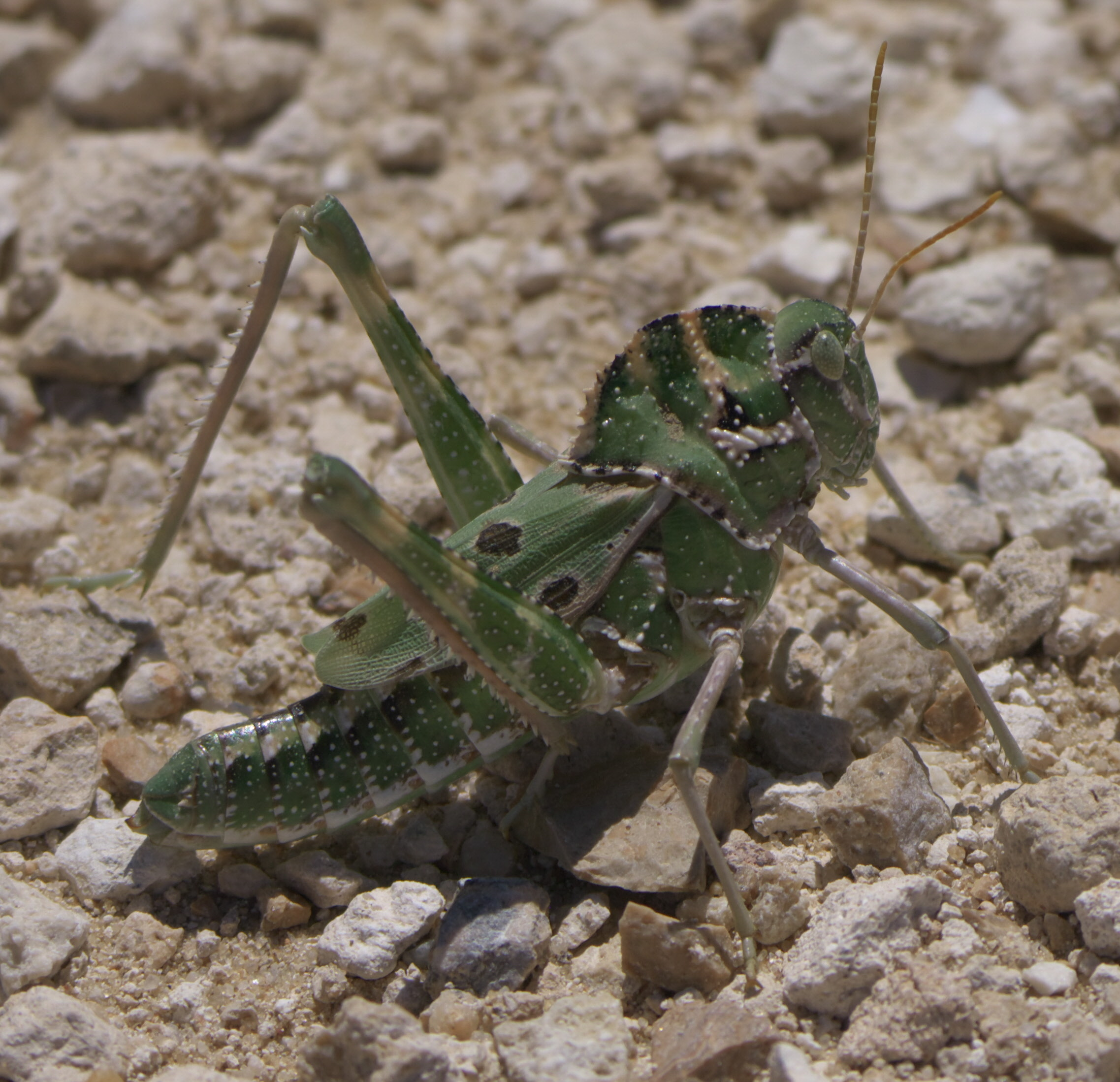

Scientific classification
- Domain: Eukaryota
- Kingdom: Animalia
- Phylum: Arthropoda
- Class: Insecta
- Order: Orthoptera
- Suborder: Caelifera
- Family: Acrididae
- Subfamily: Oedipodinae
- Tribe: Tropidolophini; Otte, 1995
- Genus: Tropidolophus; Thomas, 1873
- Species: T. formosus

Binomial name
- Tropidolophus formosus (Say, 1825)

= Tropidolophus =

Genus of grasshoppers

Tropidolophus is a genus of band-winged grasshoppers in the family Acrididae. Tropidolophus is monotypic, with the single species T. formosus, the great crested grasshopper, from North America.

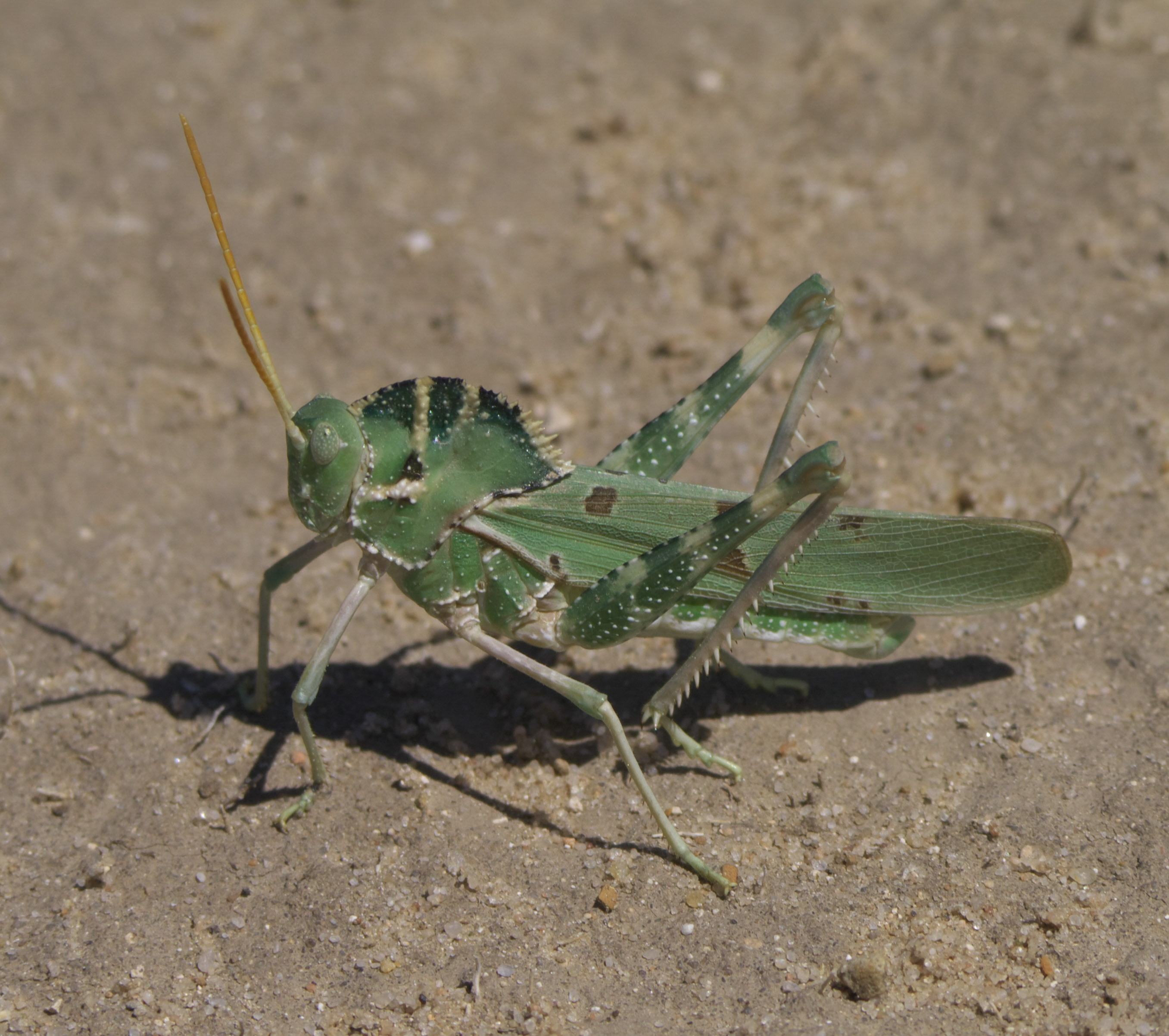
Tropidolophus formosus
