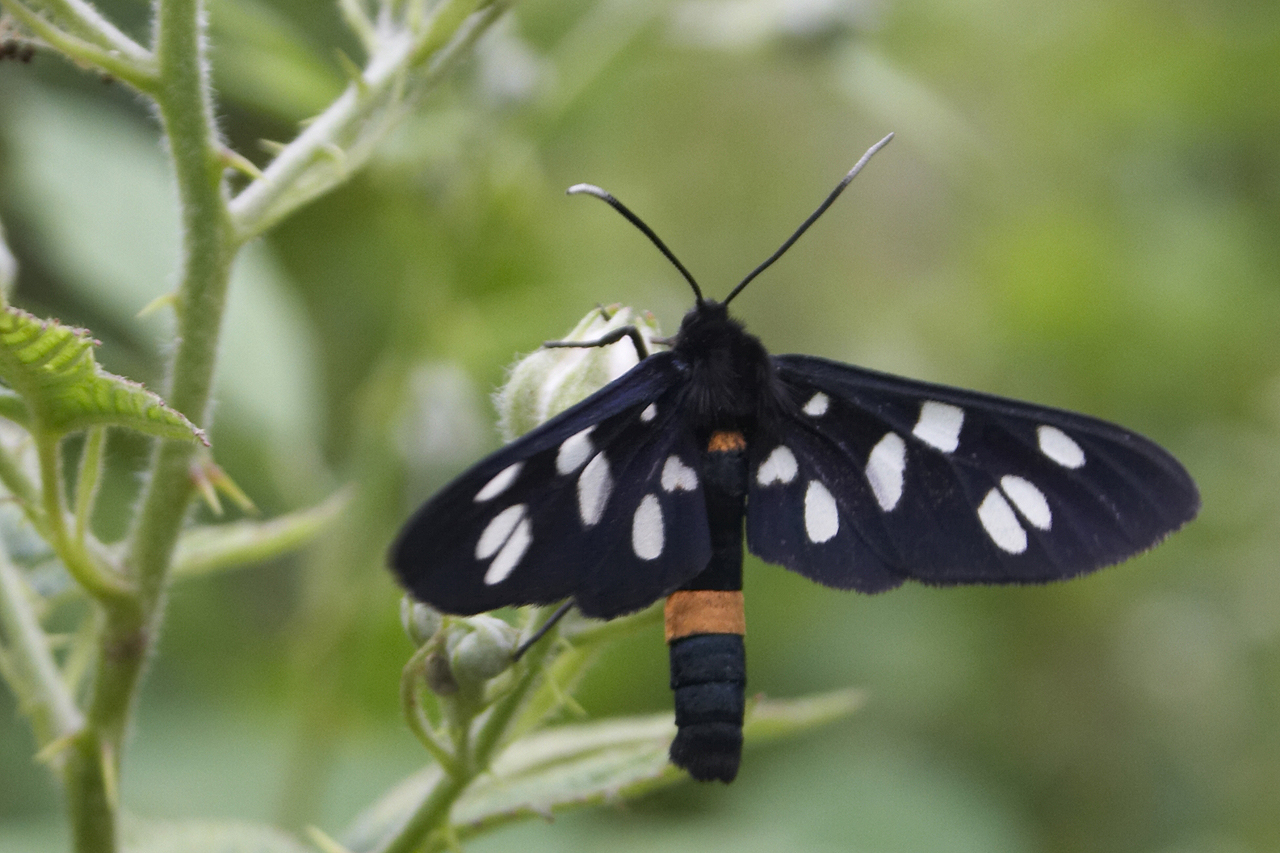
- Male
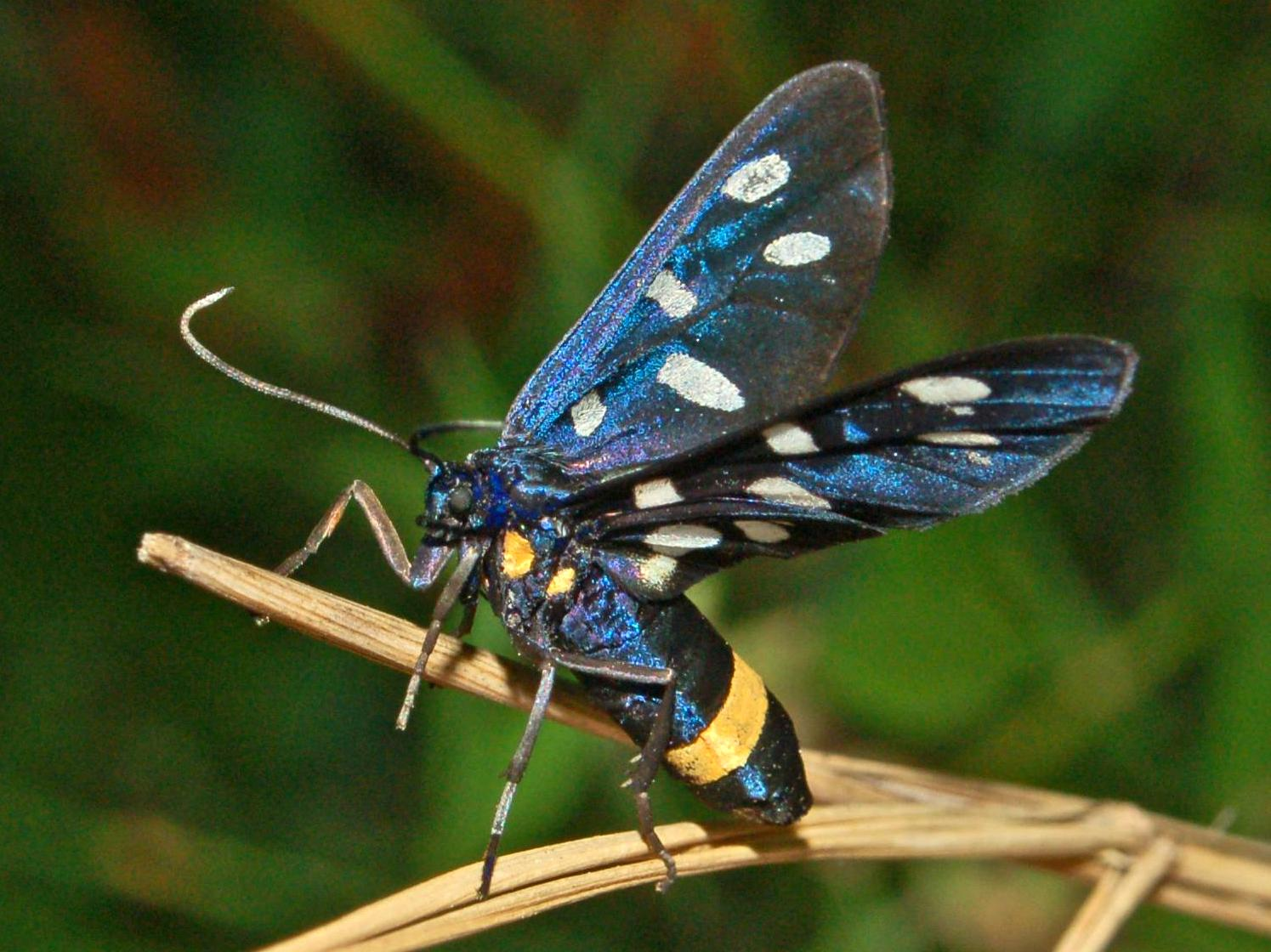
- Female, ventral view

Scientific classification
- Kingdom: Animalia
- Phylum: Arthropoda
- Clade: Pancrustacea
- Class: Insecta
- Order: Lepidoptera
- Superfamily: Noctuoidea
- Family: Erebidae
- Subfamily: Arctiinae
- Genus: Amata
- Species: A. phegea

Binomial name
- Amata phegea (Linnaeus, 1758)

Synonyms
- List: Sphinx phegea Linnaeus, 1758; Syntomis phegea (Linnaeus, 1758); Sphinx ligata Allioni, 1766; Zygaena quercus Fabricius, 1793; Sphinx iphimedia Esper, [1804]; Spinx cloelia Esper, 1783; Spinx cloelia Esper, [1804]; Syntomis phegea bessarabica Stauder, 1924; Amata phegea bessarabica nat. kijevana Obraztsov, 1936; Amata (Syntomis) phegea phegea nat. ukrainica Obraztsov, 1966; Syntomis phegea orientalis Daniel, 1950

= Nine-spotted moth =

Species of moth

The nine-spotted moth or yellow belted burnet (Amata phegea, formerly Syntomis phegea) is a moth in the family Erebidae ("tiger moths"). The species was first described by Carl Linnaeus in his 1758 10th edition of Systema Naturae.

== Distribution and habitat ==
The nine-spotted moth is chiefly found in southern Europe but also seen up to northern Germany, and in the east to Anatolia and the Caucasus, and there are some populations in the south-eastern Dutch nature reserves of Leudal and Meinweg. It does not breed in the United Kingdom, but it is a very rare immigrant. It is also found In India these days. The species prefers drier areas, open ranges with shrubs and trees as well as open forests and warm, sunny slopes.

== Description ==
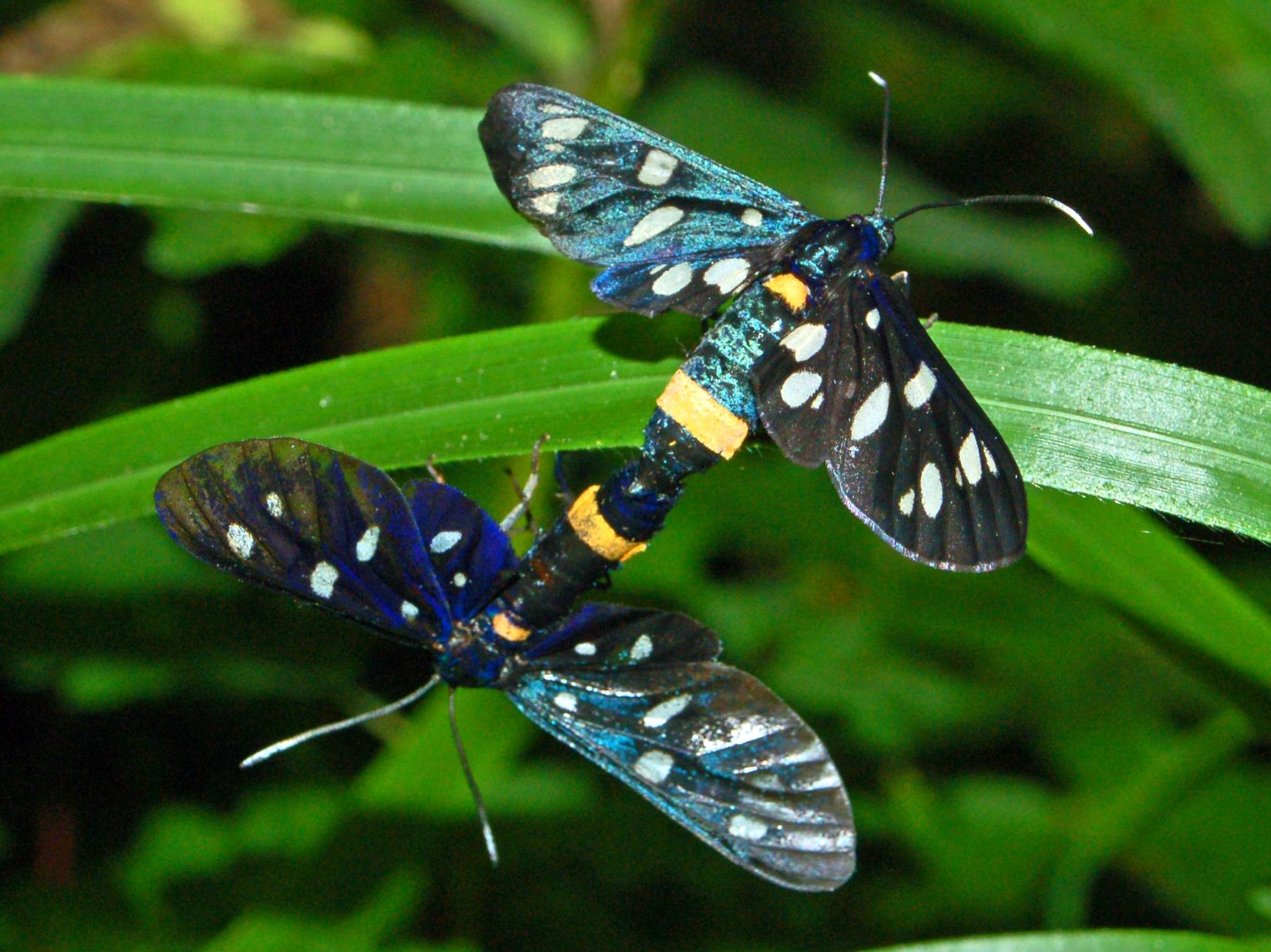
Mating pair

Amata phegea reaches a wingspan of 35–40 millimetres (1.4–1.6 in). Males are smaller than females and have thicker antennae. Wings are blueish black or greenish black with white spots and metallic sheen. The number and the size of spots are quite variable. Usually there are six white spots on the forewings and two or three spots on the hindwings. The body is quite long, with a yellow spot on the second segment of the abdomen. A further feature is the prominent yellow ring at the sixth segment of the abdomen. The black thread-like antennae have white tips. The caterpillars can reach a length of about 5 centimetres (2.0 in). They are gray black with thick dark brown, fluffy hairs that grow from small growths. The head is reddish brown.

Similar-looking moths include Amata ragazzii (Turati, 1917) and Zygaena ephialtes (Linnaeus, 1758). Z. ephialtes is in the family Zygaenidae and is unpalatable to birds. The nine-spotted moth imitates its appearance (Müllerian mimicry). Both moths are an example of aposematism.

== Biology ==
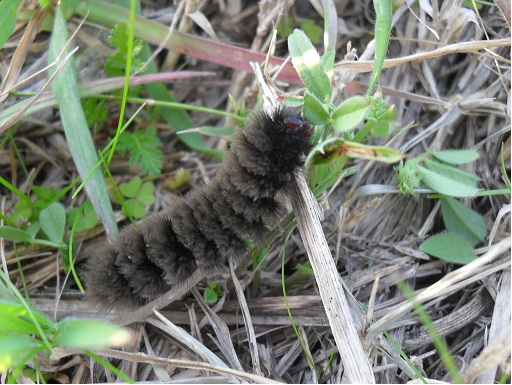
Caterpillar

This species has one generation per year (univoltine). Females lay eggs on a variety of herbs. The larvae hatch in early August and are polyphagous, feeding on a range of herbaceous plants (Plantago, Rumex, Galium, Gramineae, Taraxacum and other low plants). The caterpillar hibernates in a silken nest and pupates in May in cocoons on the ground. Adults of this diurnal moth fly on warm sunny days from late May to August, depending on location.

== Bibliography ==
- Collectif d'entomologistes amateurs, Guide des papillons nocturnes de France, Paris, Delachaux et Niestlé, 2007, 288 p. (ISBN 978-2-603-01429-5), p. 97, n. 849
- Kükenthal, W. (Ed.), Handbuch der Zoologie [Handbook of Zoology], Band 4: Arthropoda - 2. Hälfte: Insecta - Lepidoptera, moths and butterflies, in Kristensen, N. P., Handbuch der Zoologie, Fischer, M. (Scientific Editor), Teilband/Part 35: Vol. 1: Evolution, systematics, and biogeography, Berlin, New York, Walter de Gruyter, 1999, pp. x + 491, ISBN 978-3-11-015704-8, OCLC 174380917.
- P.C. Rougeot, P. Viette, Guide des papillons nocturnes d'Europe et d'Afrique du Nord, Delachaux et Niestlé, Lausanne 1978.
- Scoble, M. J., The Lepidoptera: Form, Function and Diversity, 2nd ed., London, Oxford University Press & Natural History Museum, 2011 [1992], pp. xi, 404, ISBN 978-0-19-854952-9, LCCN 92004297, OCLC 25282932.
- Stehr, F. W. (Ed.), Immature Insects, Dubuque, Iowa, Kendall/Hunt Pub. Co., 1991, pp. ix, 754, ISBN 978-0-8403-3702-3, LCCN 85081922, OCLC 13784377.
