= Tomonotus =

Scientific classification
- Domain: Eukaryota
- Kingdom: Animalia
- Phylum: Arthropoda
- Class: Insecta
- Order: Orthoptera
- Suborder: Caelifera
- Family: Acrididae
- Subfamily: Oedipodinae
- Tribe: Arphiini
- Genus: Tomonotus; Saussure, 1861

Genus of grasshoppers

Tomonotus is a genus of band-winged grasshoppers in the family Acrididae. There are at least two described species in Tomonotus.

== Species ==
These two species belong to the genus Tomonotus:

- Tomonotus ferruginosus Bruner, 1905 (oak-leaf grasshopper)
- Tomonotus mexicanus Saussure, 1861 (Mexican oak-leaf grasshopper)
