= Leptopternis =

Scientific classification
- Domain: Eukaryota
- Kingdom: Animalia
- Phylum: Arthropoda
- Class: Insecta
- Order: Orthoptera
- Suborder: Caelifera
- Family: Acrididae
- Subfamily: Oedipodinae
- Genus: Leptopternis; Saussure, 1884

Synonyms
- Leptoternis Harz, 1975

Genus of grasshoppers

External image
- Images at iNaturalist

Leptopternis is a genus of Palaearctic grasshoppers, unplaced in subfamily Oedipodinae, erected by Henri Louis Frédéric de Saussure in 1884 (originally placed as a subgenus of Sphingonotus). The recorded distribution of species is: North Africa, Europe (Russia) through to central Asia (but records are probably incomplete).

== Species ==
The Orthoptera Species File lists:

1. Leptopternis gracilis (Eversmann, 1848) - type species (as Oedipoda gracilis Eversmann, by subsequent designation.
2. Leptopternis iliensis Uvarov, 1925
3. Leptopternis maculata Vosseler, 1902
4. Leptopternis rothschildi Bolívar, 1913
5. Leptopternis vosseleri Bolívar, 1914
