= Platypygius =

Scientific classification
- Domain: Eukaryota
- Kingdom: Animalia
- Phylum: Arthropoda
- Class: Insecta
- Order: Orthoptera
- Suborder: Caelifera
- Family: Acrididae
- Subfamily: Oedipodinae
- Tribe: Epacromiini
- Genus: Platypygius; Uvarov, 1942

Genus of grasshoppers

External image
- Images at iNaturalist

Platypygius is a genus of Palaearctic grasshoppers in the tribe Epacromiini, erected by Boris Uvarov in 1942. The recorded distribution of species is the Iberian Peninsula though southern Europe to the Caucasus range (distribution may be incomplete).

== Species ==
The Orthoptera Species File lists:

1. Platypygius crassus (Karny, 1907)
2. Platypygius platypygius (Pantel, 1886) - type species (as Epacromia platypygia Pantel)
