= Sphingoderus =

Scientific classification
- Domain: Eukaryota
- Kingdom: Animalia
- Phylum: Arthropoda
- Class: Insecta
- Order: Orthoptera
- Suborder: Caelifera
- Family: Acrididae
- Subfamily: Oedipodinae
- Tribe: Sphingonotini
- Genus: Sphingoderus; Bey-Bienko, 1950

Genus of grasshoppers

External image
- Images at iNaturalist

Sphingoderus is a genus of Palaearctic grasshoppers, in the tribe Sphingonotini, erected by Grigory Bey-Bienko in 1950. The recorded distribution of species (probably incomplete) is: North Africa, Europe (Greece) through to central Asia.

== Species ==
The Orthoptera Species File lists:

1. Sphingoderus angustus Descamps, 1967
2. Sphingoderus carinatus (Saussure, 1888) - type species (as Sphingonotus coerulans variety carinata Saussure)
