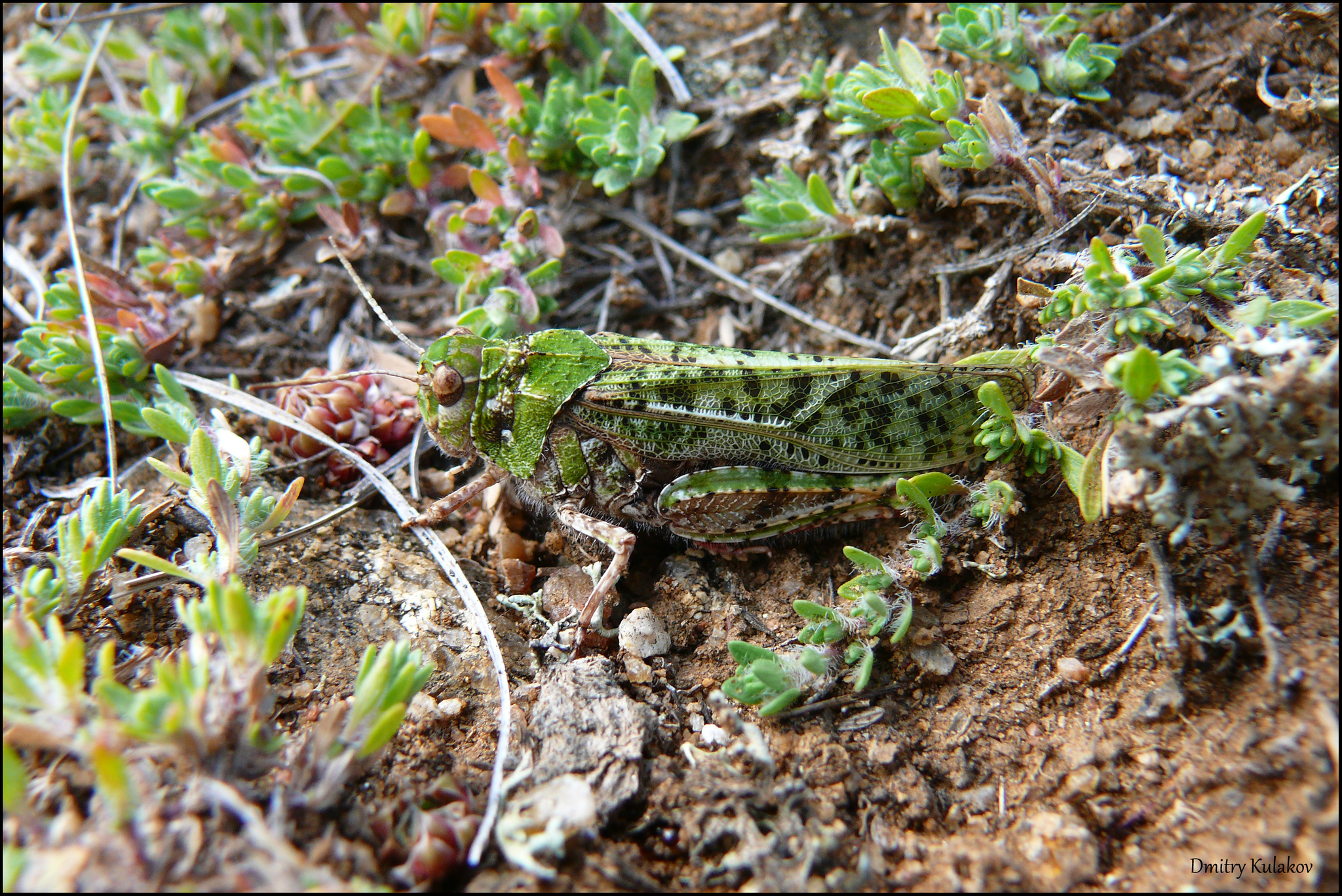

Scientific classification
- Domain: Eukaryota
- Kingdom: Animalia
- Phylum: Arthropoda
- Class: Insecta
- Order: Orthoptera
- Suborder: Caelifera
- Family: Acrididae
- Subfamily: Oedipodinae
- Tribe: Bryodemini
- Genus: Angaracris; Bey-Bienko, 1930
- Species: A. barabensis

Binomial name
- Angaracris barabensis (Pallas, 1773)

= Angaracris =

Monotypic genus of grasshoppers

Angaracris barabensis is a species of bandwing grasshopper which inhabits the steppes of central and northeast Asia.

== Classification ==
The genus Angaracris at one point contained as many as nine different species, but a 2017 paper published in Zootaxa declared them all to be synonyms of the type species, Angaracris barbarensis, making the genus monotypic.
