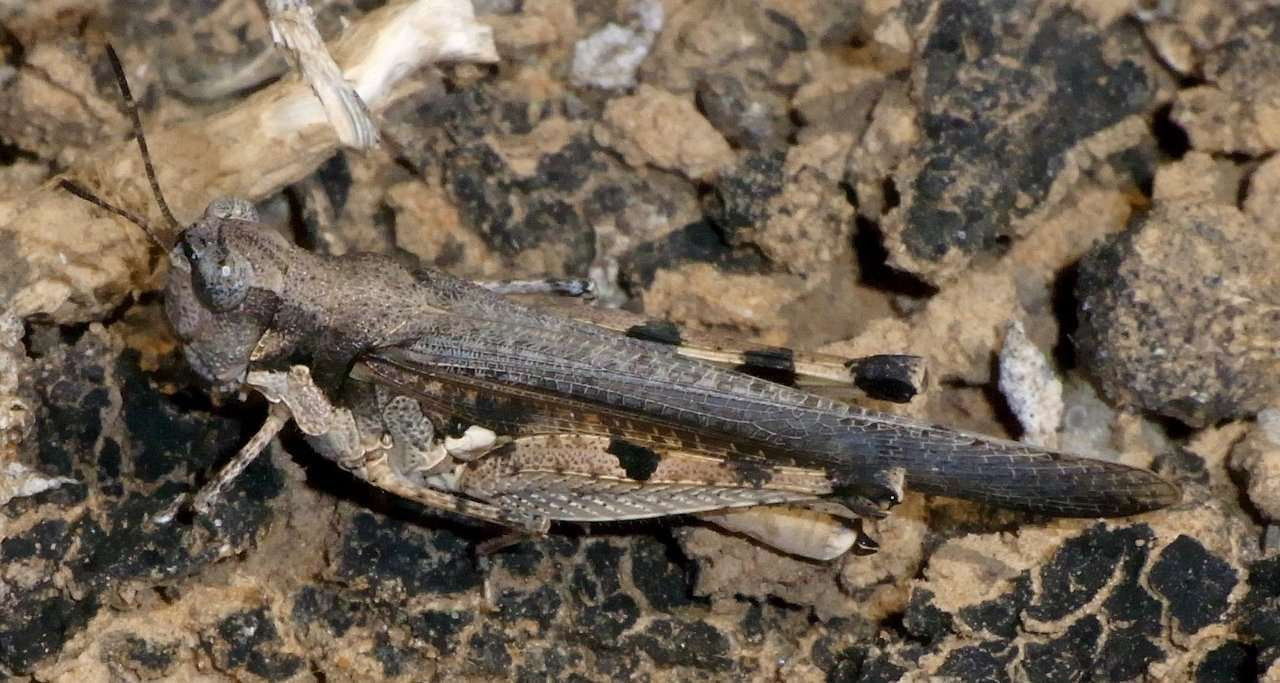
- Pycnostictus seriatus, Common Bandwing, Australia

Scientific classification
- Domain: Eukaryota
- Kingdom: Animalia
- Phylum: Arthropoda
- Class: Insecta
- Order: Orthoptera
- Suborder: Caelifera
- Family: Acrididae
- Subfamily: Oedipodinae
- Genus: Pycnostictus; Saussure, 1884
- Species: P. seriatus

Binomial name
- Pycnostictus seriatus Saussure, 1884

= Pycnostictus =

Genus of grasshoppers

Pycnostictus is a genus of band-winged grasshoppers in the family Acrididae. There is one described species in Pycnostictus, P. seriatus, found in Australasia.
