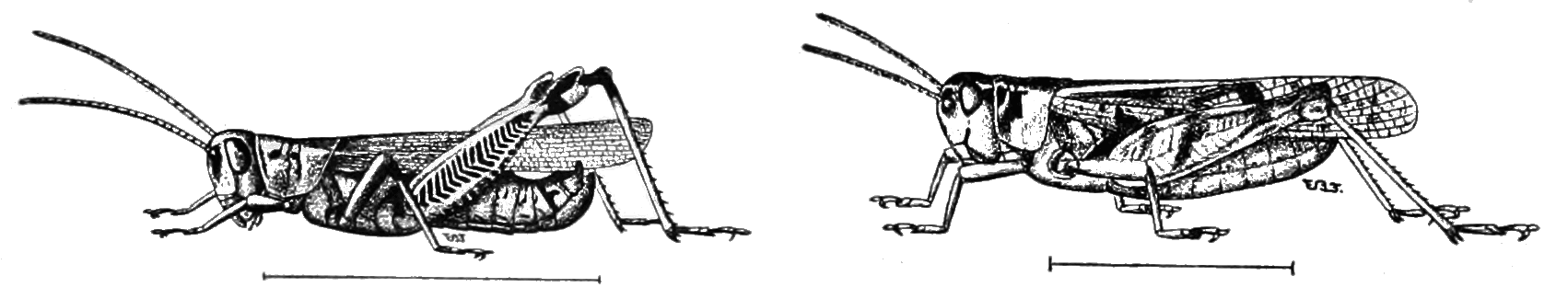

Scientific classification
- Kingdom: Animalia
- Phylum: Arthropoda
- Clade: Pancrustacea
- Class: Insecta
- Order: Orthoptera
- Suborder: Caelifera
- Family: Acrididae
- Subfamily: Oedipodinae
- Tribe: Hippiscini
- Genus: Camnula; Stål, 1873
- Species: C. pellucida

Binomial name
- Camnula pellucida (Scudder, 1863)

= Camnula =

Genus of grasshoppers

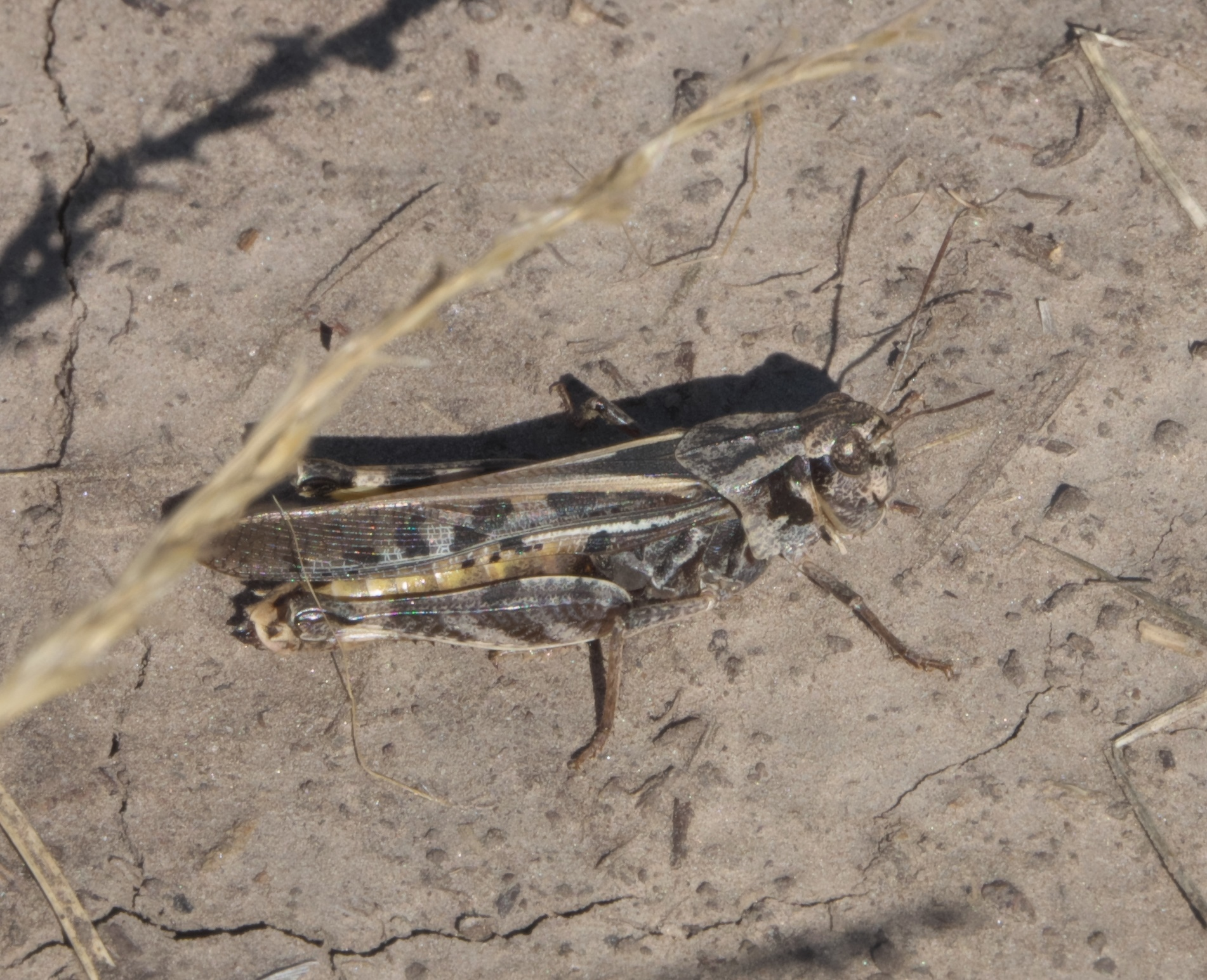
Camnula pellucida, clear-winged grasshopper, Idaho, USA

Camnula is a genus of band-winged grasshopper in the family Acrididae. It contains one species, Camnula pellucida, the clearwinged grasshopper. This grasshopper is found in most of North America excluding some southeastern states. It can be a severe pest in grains and rangelands.
