= Pternoscirta =

Scientific classification
- Kingdom: Animalia
- Phylum: Arthropoda
- Clade: Pancrustacea
- Class: Insecta
- Order: Orthoptera
- Suborder: Caelifera
- Family: Acrididae
- Subfamily: Oedipodinae
- Tribe: Locustini
- Genus: Pternoscirta; Saussure, 1884

Type species
- Acrydium cinctifemur Walker, 1859

Synonyms
- Flatovertex Zheng, 1981; Prionidia Stål, 1873

Genus of grasshoppers

Pternoscirta is a genus of grasshoppers in the family Acrididae, subfamily Oedipodinae and tribe Locustini. The recorded distribution of species includes: India, China, Indochina and Malesia.

== Species ==
The Orthoptera Species File includes:

1. Pternoscirta bimaculata (Thunberg, 1815) – a "temporary name" - Indian Subcontinent
2. Pternoscirta caliginosa (Haan, 1842) - China, Vietnam, W. Malesia
3. Pternoscirta cinctifemur (Walker, 1859) - type species, locality Sri Lanka
4. Pternoscirta longipennis Xia, 1981 - China
5. Pternoscirta pulchripes Uvarov, 1925 - China, Thailand
6. Pternoscirta sauteri (Karny, 1915) - Vietnam, Taiwan
7. Pternoscirta villosa (Thunberg, 1815) - China

Note: A binomial authority in parentheses indicates that the species was originally described in a genus other than Pternoscirta.
