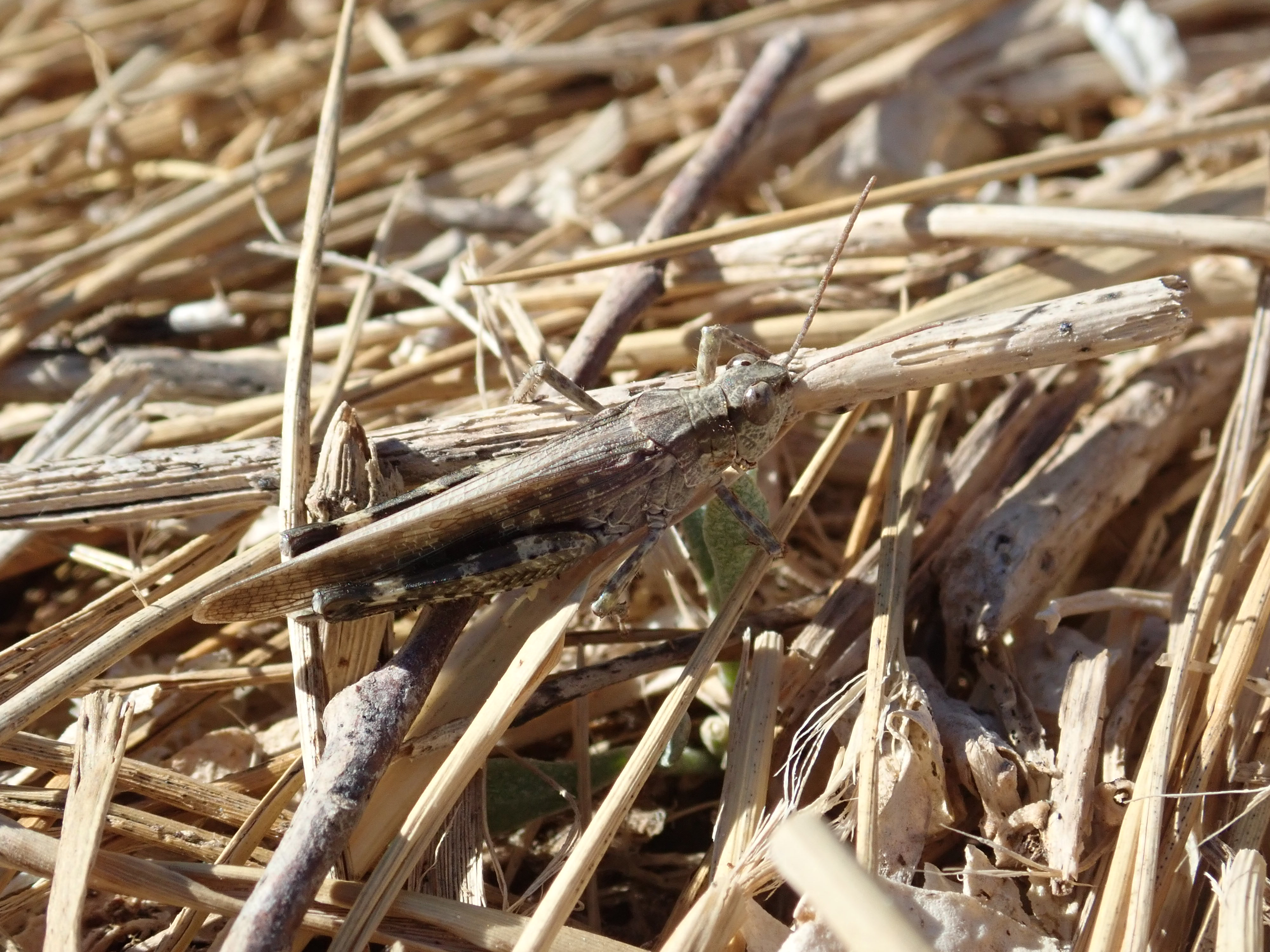
- Epacromius tergestinus

Scientific classification
- Domain: Eukaryota
- Kingdom: Animalia
- Phylum: Arthropoda
- Class: Insecta
- Order: Orthoptera
- Suborder: Caelifera
- Family: Acrididae
- Subfamily: Oedipodinae
- Tribe: Epacromiini
- Genus: Epacromius; Uvarov, 1942

= Epacromius =

Genus of grasshoppers

External image
- Images at iNaturalist

Epacromius is a genus of Palaearctic grasshoppers, typical of the tribe Epacromiini, erected by Boris Uvarov in 1942. The recorded distribution of species is France and Spain in western Europe through temperate Asia to Japan (but locality records may be incomplete).

== Species ==
The Orthoptera Species File lists:

1. Epacromius coerulipes (Ivanov, 1888)
2. Epacromius fallax Wang, 2007
3. Epacromius japonicus (Shiraki, 1910)
4. Epacromius pulverulentus (Fischer von Waldheim, 1846)
5. Epacromius tergestinus (Megerle von Mühlfeld, 1825) - type species (as Gryllus tergestinus Megerle von Mühlfeld = E. tergestinus tergestinus, one of 3 subspecies: by subsequent designation)
