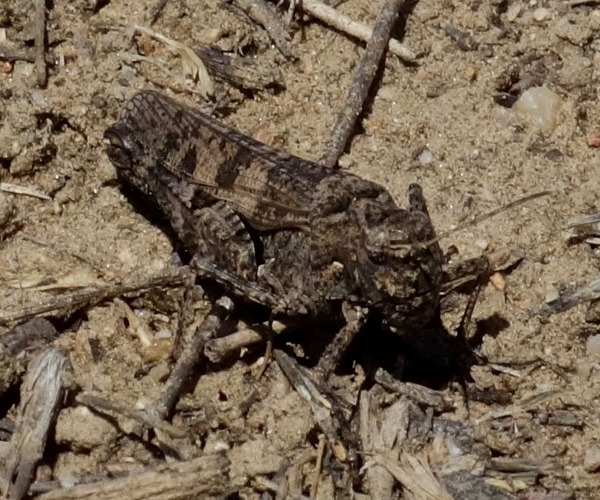
- Celes variabilis female: from Kazakhstan
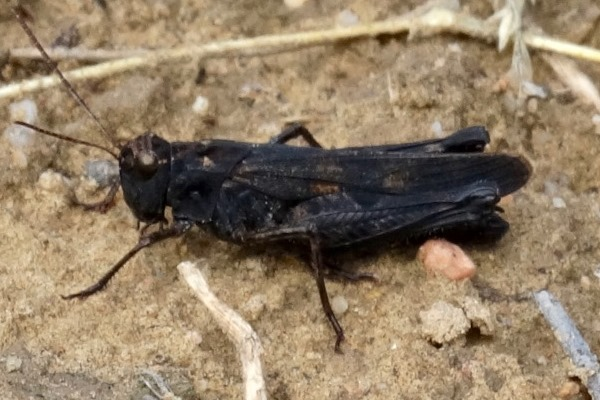
- Celes variabilis male

Scientific classification
- Domain: Eukaryota
- Kingdom: Animalia
- Phylum: Arthropoda
- Class: Insecta
- Order: Orthoptera
- Suborder: Caelifera
- Family: Acrididae
- Subfamily: Oedipodinae
- Tribe: Oedipodini
- Genus: Celes; Saussure, 1884

= Celes (grasshopper) =

Genus of grasshoppers

External image
- Images at iNaturalist

Celes is a genus of Palaearctic grasshoppers in the tribe Oedipodini, erected by Henri Louis Frédéric de Saussure in 1884. The recorded distribution of species is France and Spain in western Europe through temperate Asia to Japan (but locality records may be incomplete).

== Species ==
The Orthoptera Species File lists:

1. Celes skalozubovi Adelung, 1906 (2 subspecies)
2. Celes variabilis (Pallas, 1771) - type species (as Gryllus variabilis Pallas = C. variabilis variabilis, one of 3 subspecies)
