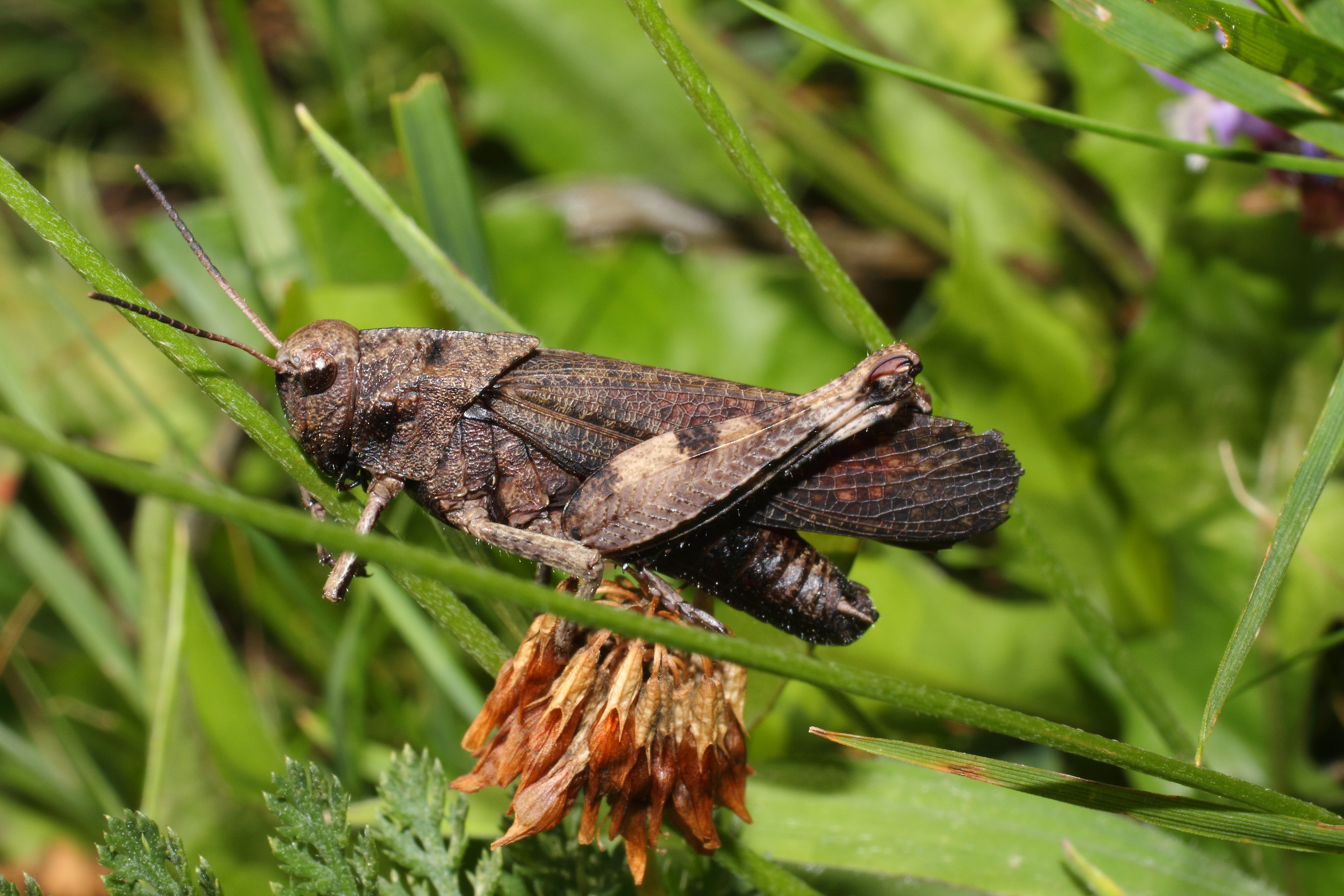

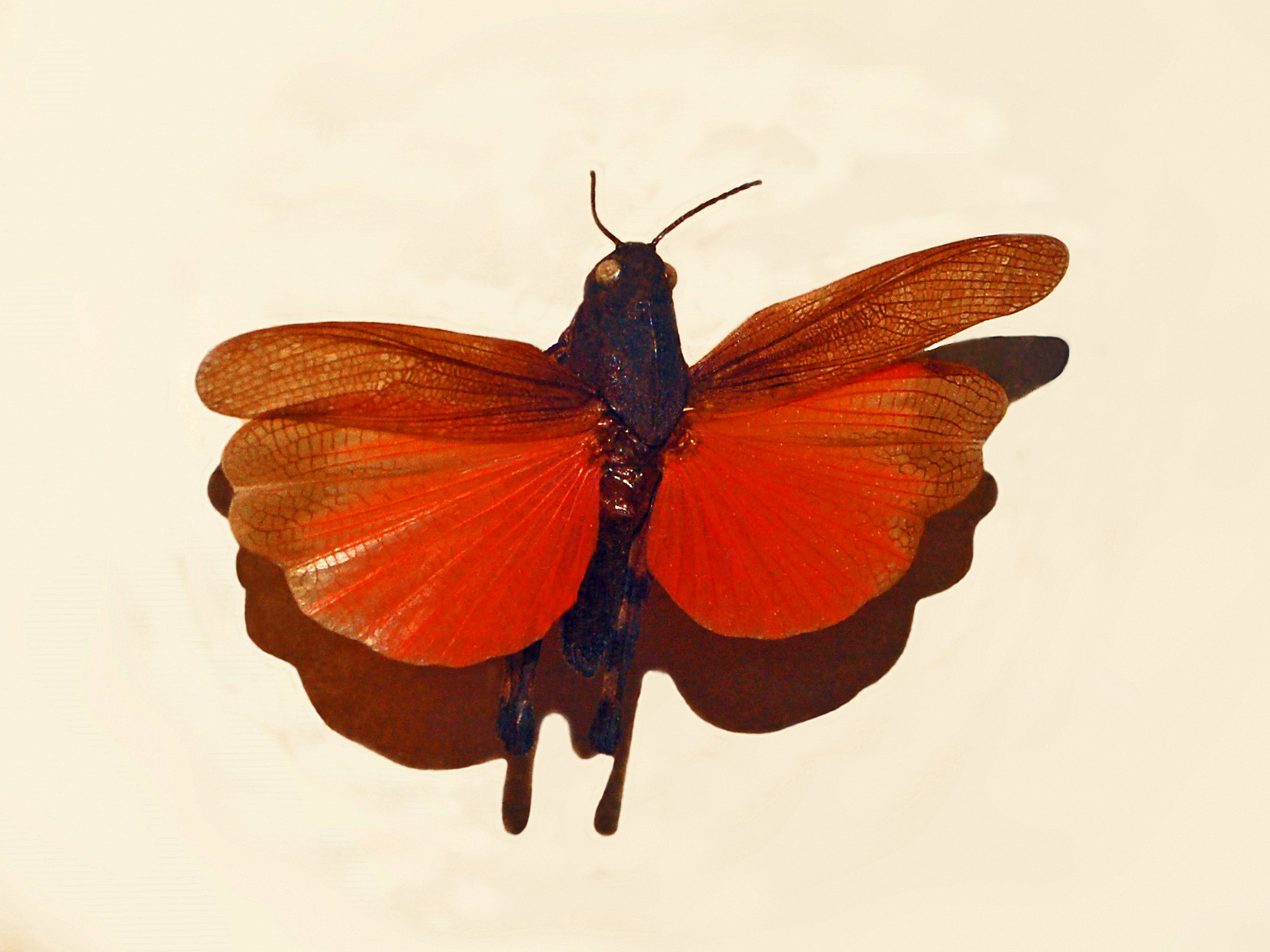
- Mounted specimen

Scientific classification
- Kingdom: Animalia
- Phylum: Arthropoda
- Clade: Pancrustacea
- Class: Insecta
- Order: Orthoptera
- Suborder: Caelifera
- Family: Acrididae
- Subfamily: Oedipodinae
- Tribe: Locustini
- Genus: Psophus
- Species: P. stridulus

Binomial name
- Psophus stridulus (Linnaeus, 1758)

Synonyms
- Acridium stridulum; Gryllus stridulus Linnaeus, 1758

= Psophus =

Genus of grasshoppers

Sound of Psophus stridulus
Field recording in the Netherlands 26s

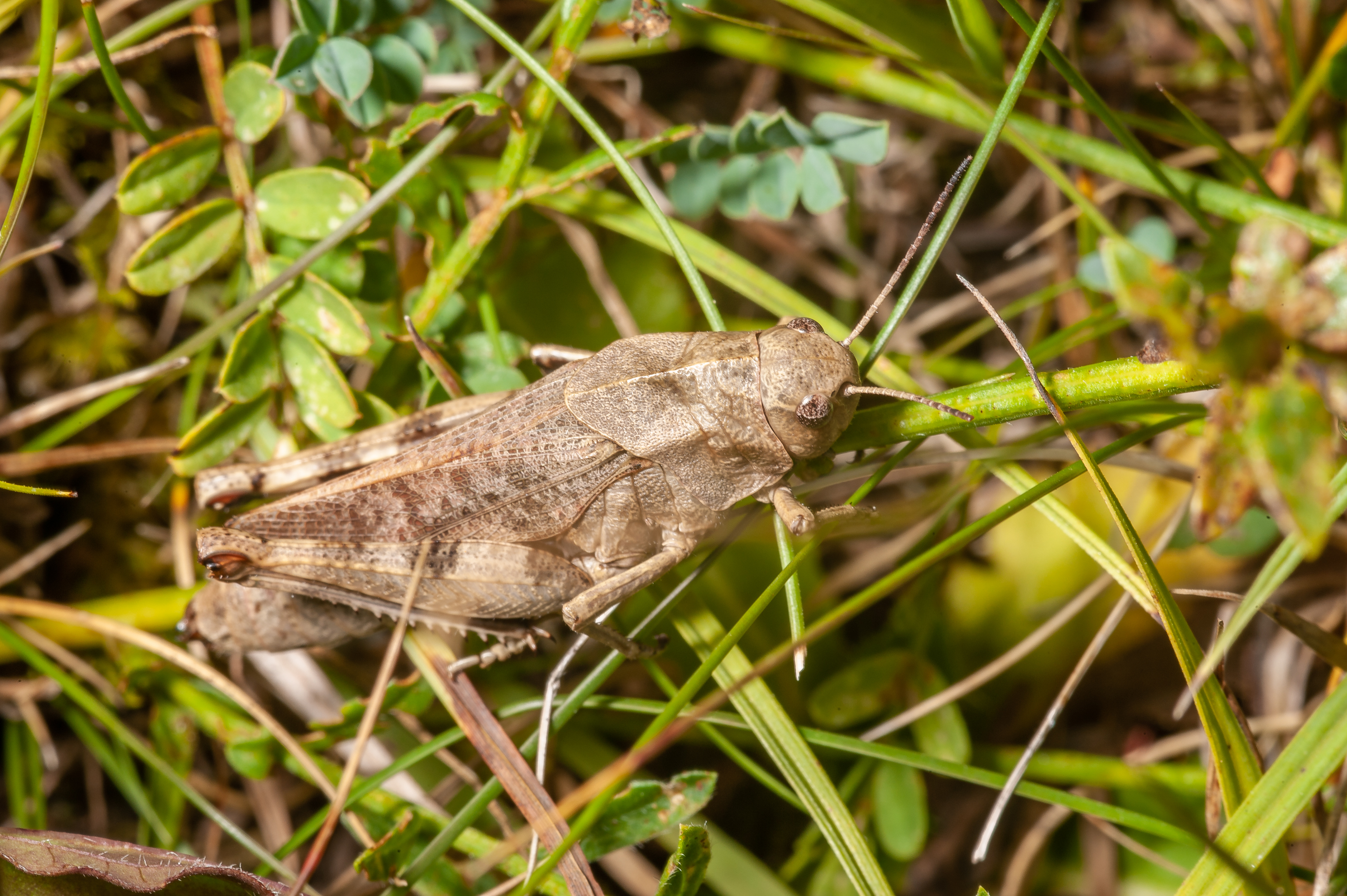
Female

Close-Up of a Psophus stridulus

Psophus is a monotypic genus of grasshopper of the family Acrididae, subfamily Oedipodinae and in the tribe Locustini. The one species in the genus is Psophus stridulus, commonly known as the rattle grasshopper.

== Description ==
Psophus stridulus can reach a length of 23–25 millimetres (0.9–1.0 in) in the males, of 26–40 millimetres (1.0–1.6 in) in the females. The basic colouration of the body varies from brown to grey–ochre or black, with lighter spots. The pronotum is strongly convex. These grasshoppers are winged, but wings are short and unfit for flight in females, fully developed in males. The hindwings are bright red-orange, with a black apex. The adults occur from July or August up to October.

== Subspecies ==
- Psophus stridulus samniticus Baccetti, 1958
- Psophus stridulus stridulus (Linnaeus, 1758)

== Distribution ==
This species can be found in Central and Southern Europe, in the eastern Palearctic realm (Siberia, Russian Far East, Middle Asia, China, Mongolia, Eastern Asia), and in the Near East.

== Habitat ==
This species lives mainly in arid and rocky open areas, mostly in mountainous regions, at an elevation up to 2,000 metres (6,600 ft) above sea level. It is known as a xeric specialist because of this, and often interacts with other species like Zygaena ephialtes in these environments.
