= Crinita =

Scientific classification
- Domain: Eukaryota
- Kingdom: Animalia
- Phylum: Arthropoda
- Class: Insecta
- Order: Orthoptera
- Suborder: Caelifera
- Family: Acrididae
- Subfamily: Oedipodinae
- Genus: Crinita; Dirsh, 1949

Genus of grasshoppers

Crinita is a genus of short-horned grasshoppers in the family Acrididae. There are at least two described species in Crinita from the Middle East.

== Species ==
These two species belong to the genus Crinita:

- Crinita hirtipes (Uvarov, 1923) - type species - locality Jericho, Palestine
- Crinita nigripes (Uvarov, 1929)
