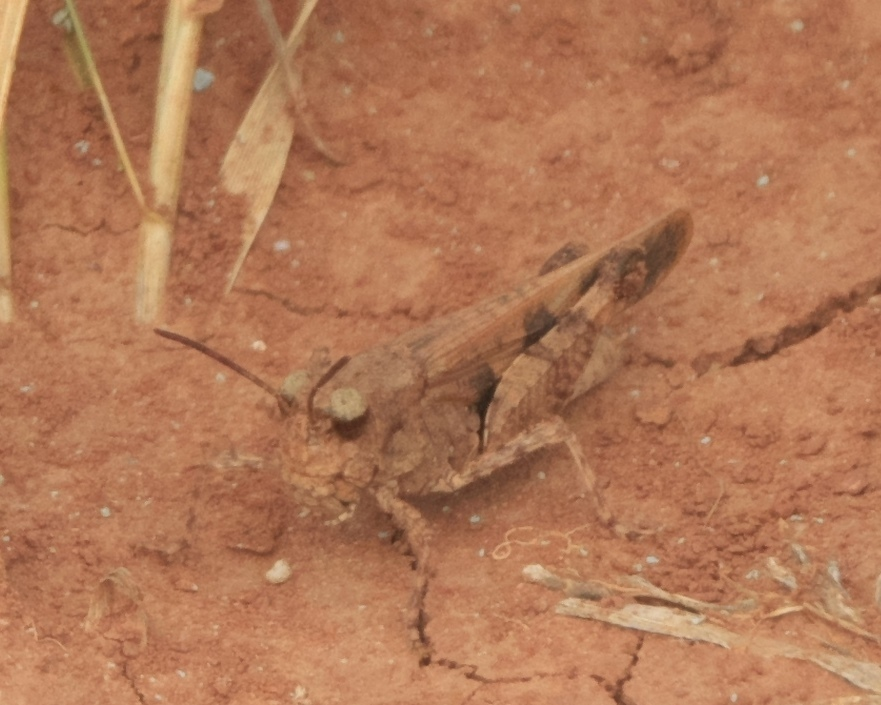
- Nebulatettix subgracilis, Southwestern Dusky Grasshopper, Oklahoma, USA

Scientific classification
- Domain: Eukaryota
- Kingdom: Animalia
- Phylum: Arthropoda
- Class: Insecta
- Order: Orthoptera
- Suborder: Caelifera
- Family: Acrididae
- Subfamily: Oedipodinae
- Tribe: Chortophagini
- Genus: Nebulatettix; Gómez, Lightfoot & Miller, 2012

= Nebulatettix =

Genus of grasshoppers

Nebulatettix is a genus of band-winged grasshoppers in the family Acrididae. There are at least three described species in Nebulatettix, found in North America.

== Species ==
These species belong to the genus Nebulatettix:

- Nebulatettix pallidus (Bruner, 1893)
- Nebulatettix robustus (Rehn & Hebard, 1909)
- Nebulatettix subgracilis (Caudell, 1903) (Southwestern Dusky Grasshopper)
