= Shotwellia =

Scientific classification
- Domain: Eukaryota
- Kingdom: Animalia
- Phylum: Arthropoda
- Class: Insecta
- Order: Orthoptera
- Suborder: Caelifera
- Family: Acrididae
- Subfamily: Oedipodinae
- Tribe: Chortophagini
- Genus: Shotwellia; Gurney, 1940
- Species: S. isleta

Binomial name
- Shotwellia isleta Gurney, 1940

Genus of grasshoppers

Shotwellia is a genus of band-winged grasshoppers in the family Acrididae. There is one described species in Shotwellia, Shotwellia isleta.
