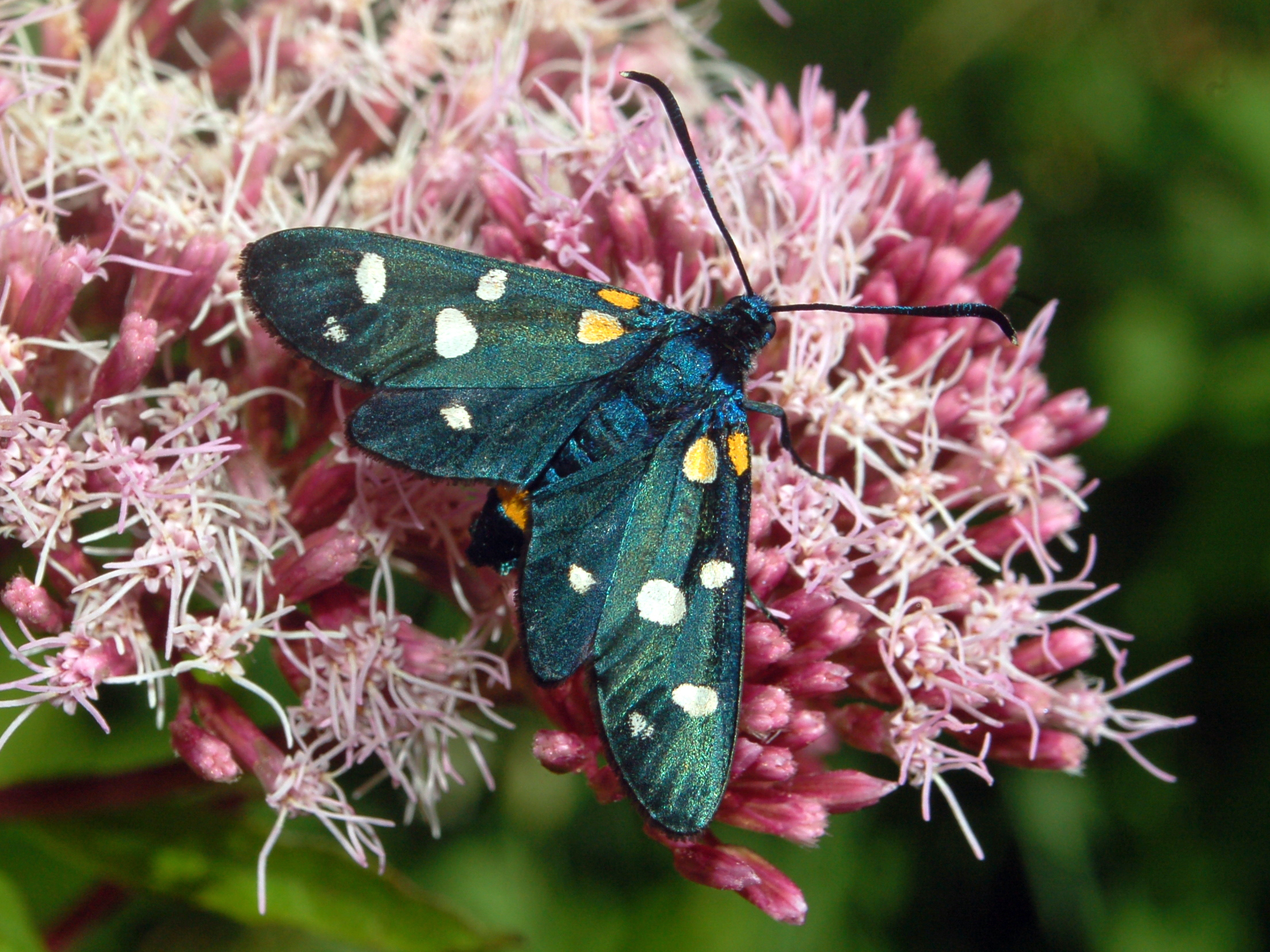
- Ephialtoid form
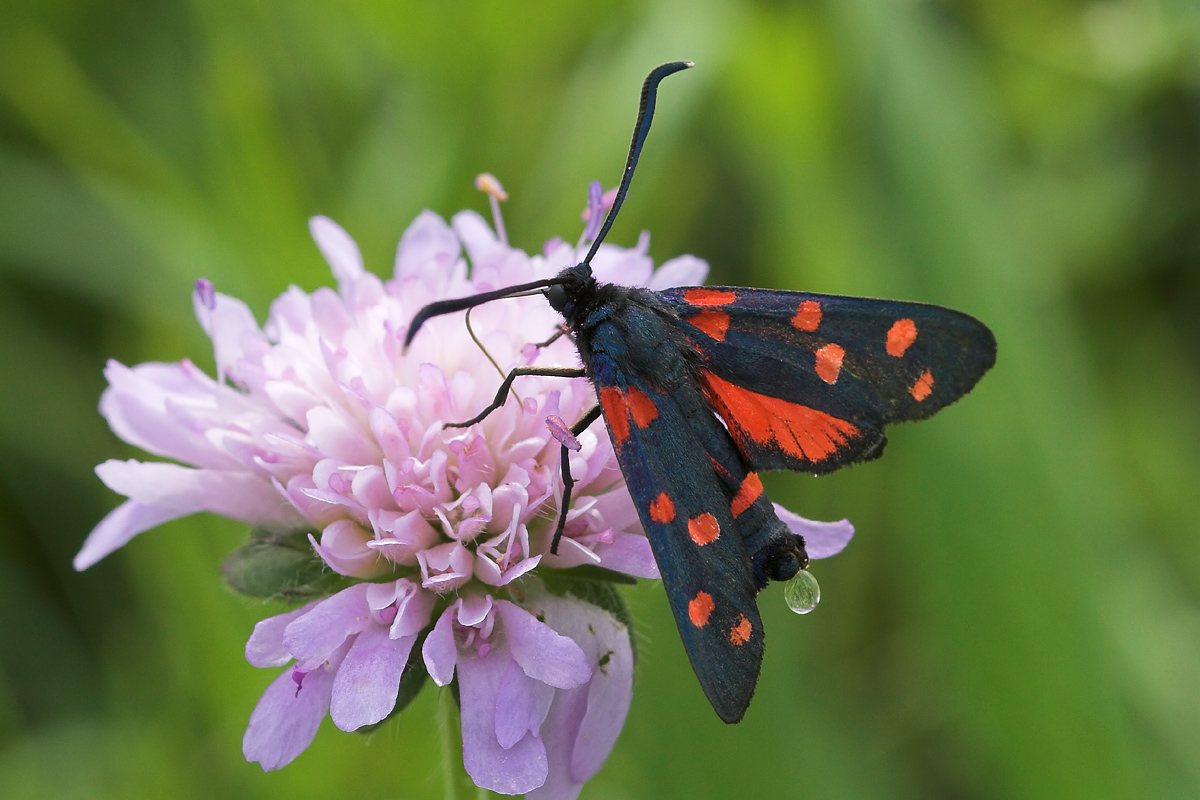
- Peucedanoid form

Scientific classification
- Kingdom: Animalia
- Phylum: Arthropoda
- Clade: Pancrustacea
- Class: Insecta
- Order: Lepidoptera
- Family: Zygaenidae
- Genus: Zygaena
- Species: Z. ephialtes

Binomial name
- Zygaena ephialtes (Linnaeus, 1767)

Synonyms
- Sphinx ephialtes Linnaeus, 1767; Sphinx athamanthae Esper, 1789; Sphinx coronillae Denis & Schiffermuller, 1775; Sphynx medusa Pallas, 1771; Sphinx peucedani Esper, 1780

= Zygaena ephialtes =

Species of moth

Zygaena ephialtes is day-flying species of burnet moth found in Europe. It is typically found in xeric habitats, and populations have recently decreased. It also exhibits Müllerian mimicry with other species, like Amata phegea.

== Description ==
Z. ephialtes typically fly during the day. Adult butterfly flight is often characterized as slow. As characteristic of Zygaenidae moths, they have prominent spots on their wings, which alerts predators that they contain toxins.

== Technical description and variation ==
Z. ephialtes L. (= falcatae Boisd.) (5 i, k). Forewing with 6 spots; the basal pair red, the others white; hindwing with a white dot. Abdomen with red belt. From South Germany and Switzerland, eastwards to Greece and South Siberia.[doubtful (misident.) ] — medusa Pall. [ now Z. ephialtes ssp. medusa Pallas, 1771] (5 k) is the form without the 6. spot: being especially frequent in the eastern districts of the area. — In the west of the area, especially in Northern Italy, South Germany, Austria, and also in some of the Balcan States, there occur two forms which are marked like ephialtes ssp. medusa, but have the 2 basal spots of the forewing and the abdominal belt deep yellow instead of red; these forms are coronillae Esp.[ now Z. ephialtes ssp. coronillae [Denis & Schiffermüller] ], (6a) with 6 spots, and trigonellae Esp. [ now Z. ephialtes ssp. coronillae [Denis & Schiffermüller], 1775 ] (6a) with 5 spots. — Likewise in Austria there occur, often together with other forms at the same places, two varieties in which the spots of the forewing as well as the whole hindwing except the black margin are yellow; these are icterica Led. [now Z. ephialtes ssp. coronillae [Denis & Schiffermüller], 1775 ] (6 a) with 6 spots, and aeacus Esp. [now Z. ephialtes ssp. coronillae [Denis & Schiffermüller], 1775 ] (6 b) with 5 spots on the forewing. Sometimes the yellow colour has a strong reddish tint; such forms are named by Hirschke princi (6b), if there are 6 spots, and aurantiaca if there are 5. — Also red forms are found which are similar in appearance to red-belted filipendulae resp trifolii ab. orobi, being also the most northern forms. They are peucedani Esp. [ now Z. ephialtes ssp. peucedani Esper, 1780] (= hippocrepidis H.-Sch.; aeacus Hubn.) (6b) with 6 spots, and athamanthae Esp.[ now Z. ephialtes ssp. athamanthae Esper, 1789] (= veronicae Bkh.) (6c) with 5. The red colour of the hindwing of these forms may more and more be replaced by the black marginal band, being finally represented only by a red central spot. These forms are ab. guenneri Hirschke [ now Z. ephialtes ssp. coronillae [Denis & Schiffermüller], 1775], if there are 6 spots, and ab. metzgeri Hirschke [ now Z. ephialtes ssp. coronillae [Denis & Schiffermüller], 1775], if there are 5. — We have further to mention a group of aberrations in which the hindwing bears two small spots instead of a single white or red one. This modification is known of nearly all the above-mentioned forms and has received special names. Thus, ephialtes with 2 white spots to the hindwing bears the name sophiae Favre, the corresponding form of medusa being aemilii Favre, while coronillae with 2 spots is bahri Hirschke and the corresponding trigonellae- form wutzdorffi Hirschke. — Larva yellow or green, reddish yellow at the sides, with pale belts; a dorsal stripe and subdorsal rows of spots black; above the legs rows of black dots; on the whole similar to the larva of filipendulae; in May adult on Vetch, Trefoil, Thyme, Eryngium, Plantago, etc., the black pupa in a white-yellow silky cocoon. The imagines fly in July in meadows, venturing even into gardens; they are especially often found resting on the heads of thistles standing near the edges of woods and on fallow ground, sometimes one finds only one form at a certain place, sometimes several forms fly about at the same time in one field, copulating together, the offspring, however, not having mixed or transitional characters. Occasionally specimens of this species have been met with which were in copula with individuals of entirely different species.

== Range ==
This moths is spread throughout most of Europe, ranging from Spain to the Ural Mountains. It is not found in the British Isles, northern Europe, or certain islands in the Mediterranean.

== Habitat ==
A study was done by Jakub Horak that focused on populations in the Czech Republic. Many previously unknown habitat preferences of Z. ephialtes were found. This species cannot survive in forested areas or areas with a closed canopy. Z. ephialtes prefer xeric conditions, and were rarely found in more humid areas. The two times they were found in non-exeric areas, the areas were previously xeric sites that were abandoned. The xeric areas that were studied also had many species that are specifically associated with xeric environments, referred to as xeric specialists. Some of these species include Phengaris arion, Psophus stridulus, Polyommatus coridon, Polyommatus daphnis, Plebjus argus, and Zygaena carniolica. This study showed that Z. ephialtes is an important part of xeric habitats.

== Behavior ==
=== Migration ===
Because of the slower nature of the adult butterflies' movement, a typical butterfly's range was thought to be on the smaller side. However, after observing populations in the Czech Republic, it was found that this species was found during quick flying events over longer distances.

== Life cycle ==
=== Eggs ===
The eggs are pale yellow. They are laid in a single layer and in many batches.

=== Caterpillars ===
Caterpillars appear yellow with small black portions.

=== Pupae ===
Pupae appear brown and are typically found on the stems of grasses.

=== Adults ===
Z. ephialtes are one of the largest species of burnet moths. Their flight has been described as slow and undulating.

== Host plants ==
There are many host plants for Z. ephialtes. The most common are Coronilla emerus, Securigera varia (purple crown vetch) and Hippocrepis comosa (horseshoe vetch). Another species that has been observed less frequently is Hippocrepis emerus (scorpion senna).

== Mimicry ==
Amata phegea is another spotted moth species that looks similar to Z. ephialtes. Because Z. ephialtes is unpalatable to other species, A. phegea takes advantage of this. Z. ephialtes is hyper-polymorphic, with two main forms- peucedanoid or ephialtoid. The peucedanoid form consists of a colored forewing and hindwing with spots. The ephialtoid form consists of all the forewing spots being white except the two basal spots, and the hindwings being black with a white spot. Either of these forms can be red or yellow. The yellow form has been found to be more advantageous than the red one.

== Subspecies ==
Subspecies include:

- Zygaena ephialtes ephialtes
- Zygaena ephialtes albaflavens Verity, 1920
- Zygaena ephialtes albarubens Verity, 1946
- Zygaena ephialtes athamanthae (Esper, 1789)
- Zygaena ephialtes bohemia Reiss, 1922
- Zygaena ephialtes chalkidikae Holik, 1937
- Zygaena ephialtes corcyrica Rauch, 1981
- Zygaena ephialtes coronillae (Denis & Schiffermuller, 1775)
- Zygaena ephialtes danastriensis Holik, 1939
- Zygaena ephialtes istoki Silbernagel, 1944
- Zygaena ephialtes ligus Verity, 1946
- Zygaena ephialtes lurica Dujardin, 1965
- Zygaena ephialtes medusa (Pallas, 1771)
- Zygaena ephialtes meridiei Burgeff, 1926
- Zygaena ephialtes pannonica Holik, 1937
- Zygaena ephialtes peucedani (Esper, 1780)
- Zygaena ephialtes podolica Holik, 1932
- Zygaena ephialtes retyesati Holik, 1948
- Zygaena ephialtes roussilloni Koch, 1940
- Zygaena ephialtes smolikana Naumann & Rose, 1981
- Zygaena ephialtes tambovensis Holik & Sheljuzhko, 1953
- Zygaena ephialtes taurida Holik & Sheljuzhko, 1953
- Zygaena ephialtes transpadana Verity, 1946
- Zygaena ephialtes tymphrestica Holik, 1948

== Conservation ==
As mentioned earlier, this species is an integral part of xeric environments. However, with the decline in these environments, the species is also vanishing from many of these regions. Because of changing environments, these butterflies are required to travel longer than normal distances to find suitable habitats. Populations are declining. Some sources say that this species is critically endangered. Recently there has been some human involvement with the species by protecting some xeric sites that the butterflies inhabit.

== Bibliography ==
- Šašić, Martina; Nahirnić, Ana; Tarmann, Gerhard M. (2016-12-31). "Zygaenidae (Lepidoptera) in the Lepidoptera collections of the Croatian Natural History Museum". Natura Croatica: Periodicum Musei Historiae Naturalis Croatici. 25 (2): 233–248. doi:10.20302/NC.2016.25.19. eISSN 1848-7386. Useful for subspecies distribution.
