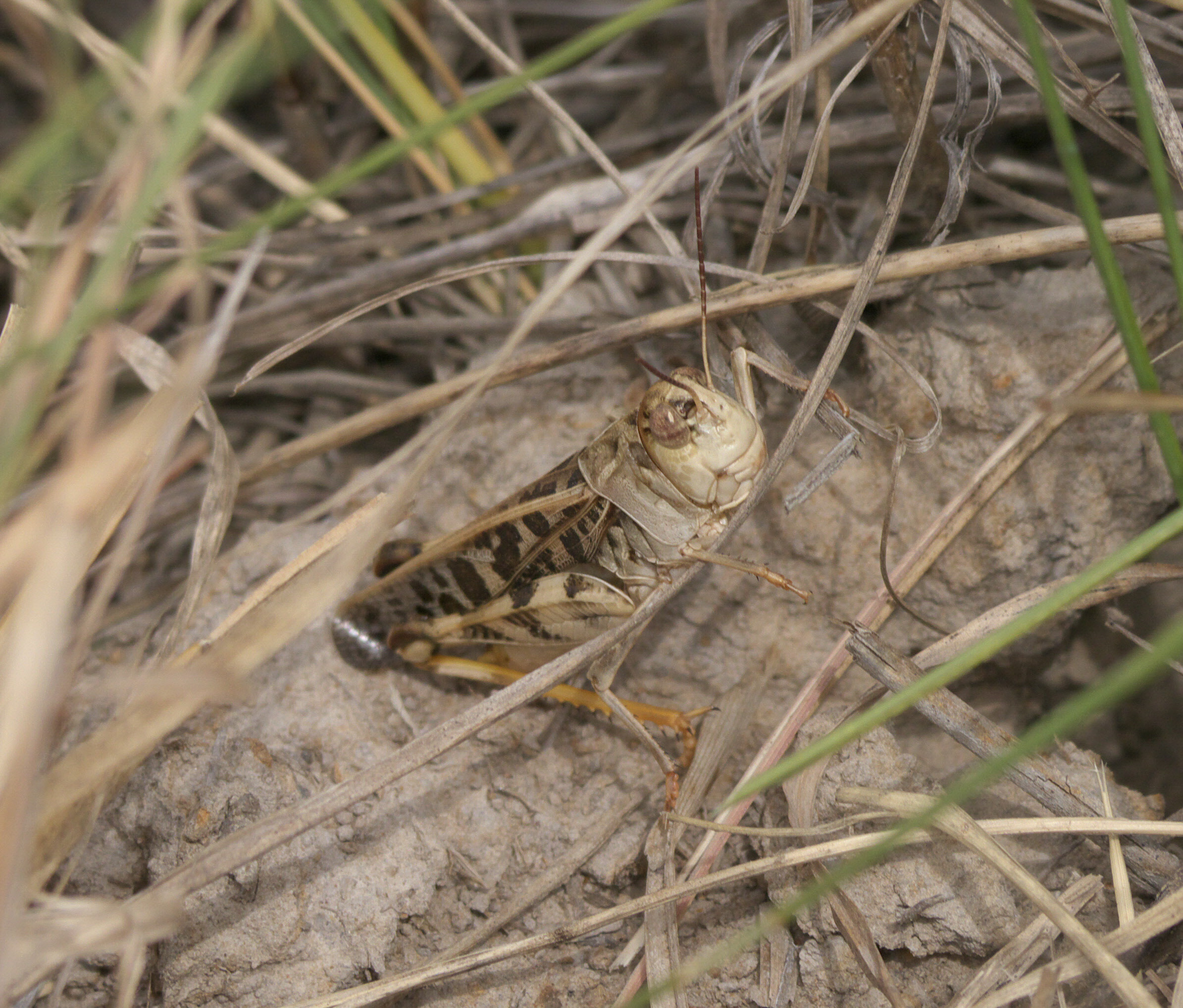

Scientific classification
- Domain: Eukaryota
- Kingdom: Animalia
- Phylum: Arthropoda
- Class: Insecta
- Order: Orthoptera
- Suborder: Caelifera
- Family: Acrididae
- Subfamily: Oedipodinae
- Tribe: Hippiscini
- Genus: Hippiscus; Saussure, 1861
- Species: H. ocelote

Binomial name
- Hippiscus ocelote (Saussure, 1861)

Synonyms
- Hippiscus citrinus Scudder SH, 1901; Hippiscus compactus Scudder SH, 1892; Hippiscus immaculatus Morse, 1906; Oedipoda rugosa Scudder SH, 1862; Oedipoda ocelote Saussure, 1861; Hippiscus suturalis Scudder SH, 1892; Hippiscus transtrigata (Walker F, 1870); Hippiscus variegatus Scudder SH, 1892

= Hippiscus =

Genus of grasshoppers

Hippiscus is a genus of band-winged grasshoppers in the family Acrididae. There is only one described species in the genus, Hippiscus ocelote from North America.
