= Pusana =

Scientific classification
- Domain: Eukaryota
- Kingdom: Animalia
- Phylum: Arthropoda
- Class: Insecta
- Order: Orthoptera
- Suborder: Caelifera
- Family: Acrididae
- Subfamily: Oedipodinae
- Tribe: Acrotylini
- Genus: Pusana; Uvarov, 1940

Type species
- Pusana laevis Uvarov, 1921

Synonyms
- Pusa Uvarov, 1921; Longipternis Yin, 1984

Genus of grasshoppers

Pusana is a genus of grasshoppers in the subfamily Oedipodinae with species found in the Indian subcontinent.

== Species ==
The following species are recognised in the genus Pusana:

- Pusana chayuensis (Yin, 1984)
- Pusana laevis (Uvarov, 1921)
- Pusana rugulosa (Uvarov, 1921)
