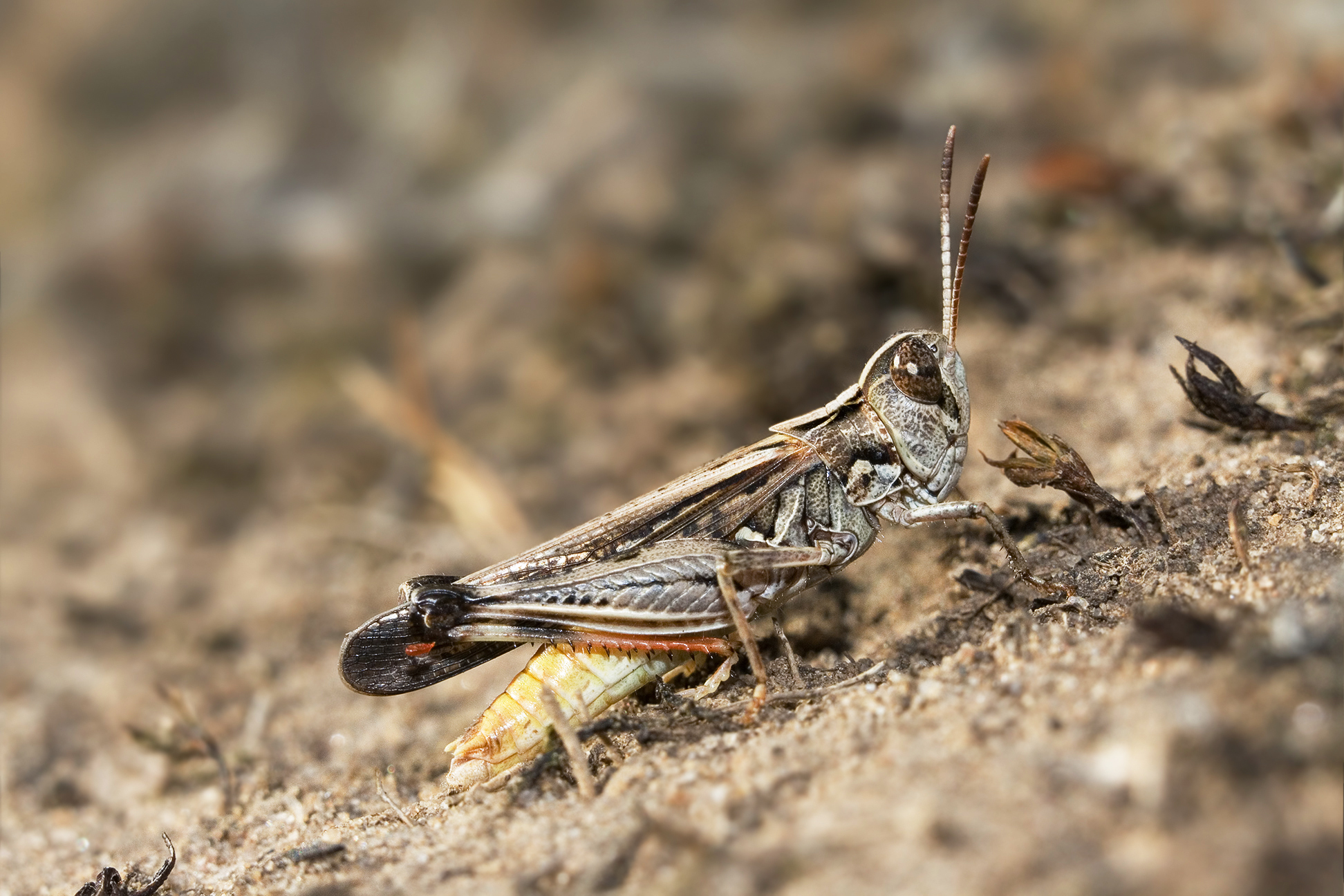
- Austroicetes vulgaris

Scientific classification
- Kingdom: Animalia
- Phylum: Arthropoda
- Clade: Pancrustacea
- Class: Insecta
- Order: Orthoptera
- Suborder: Caelifera
- Family: Acrididae
- Subfamily: Oedipodinae; Walker, 1871

Tribes
- See text

Synonyms
- Locustidae Kirby, 1825; Locustinae Kirby, 1825; Oedipodidae Walker, 1871

= Bandwing =

Bandwings

Subfamily of grasshoppers

Bandwings, or band-winged grasshoppers, are the subfamily Oedipodinae of grasshoppers classified under the family Acrididae. They have a worldwide distribution and were originally elevated to full family status as the Oedipodidae. Many species primarily inhabit xeric weedy fields, and some are considered to be important locusts:

- Locusta migratoria: the migratory locust
- Chortoicetes terminifera: the Australian plague locust
- Locustana pardalina the brown locust

These grasshoppers often have colorful hindwings that may be yellow or red and edged with black. Others have black hindwings with pale edges, and a few species (including the most economically important ones) have clear hindwings. The arolium is extremely small or absent. Many species engage in crepitation, producing crackling sounds with their wings while in flight.

== Defense ==
When bandwings feel safe, they appear drab. When they feel threatened, they leap out to reveal bold and bright colors. Some predators might even mistake the blue-winged grasshopper for a butterfly. But when the predator looks for the grasshopper, it is hiding in the grass. Bandwings continue this process if the predator tries to attack them.

== Tribes and genera ==
The Orthoptera Species File lists the following:

=== Tribe Acrotylini ===
Auth. Shumakov 1963; distribution: Africa, Europe, Asia, Australia

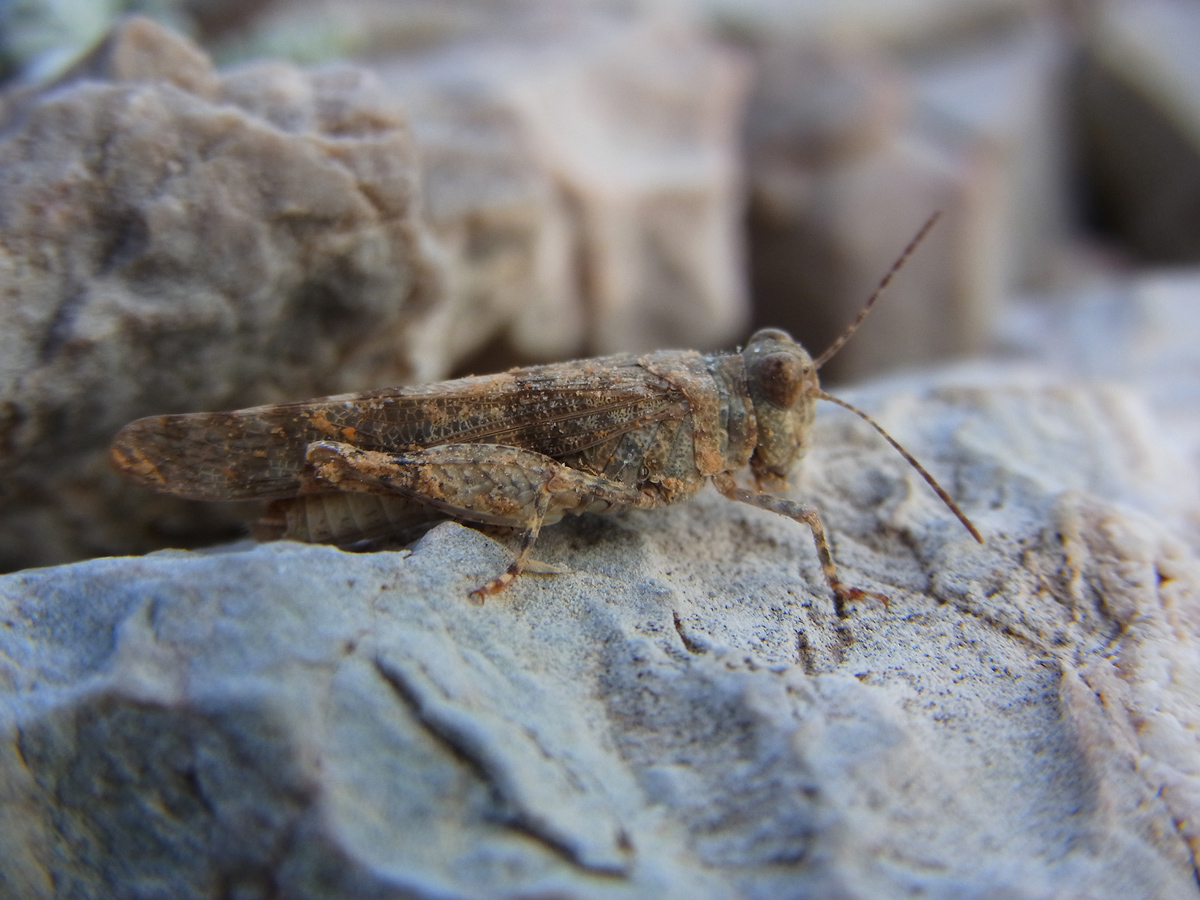
Acrotylus patruelis

1. Acrotylus Fieber, 1853
2. Pusana Uvarov, 1940

=== Tribe Anconiini ===
Auth. Otte, 1995; distribution: N. America (monotypic)

1. Anconia Scudder, 1876

=== Tribe Arphiini ===
Auth. Otte, 1995; distribution: N. America

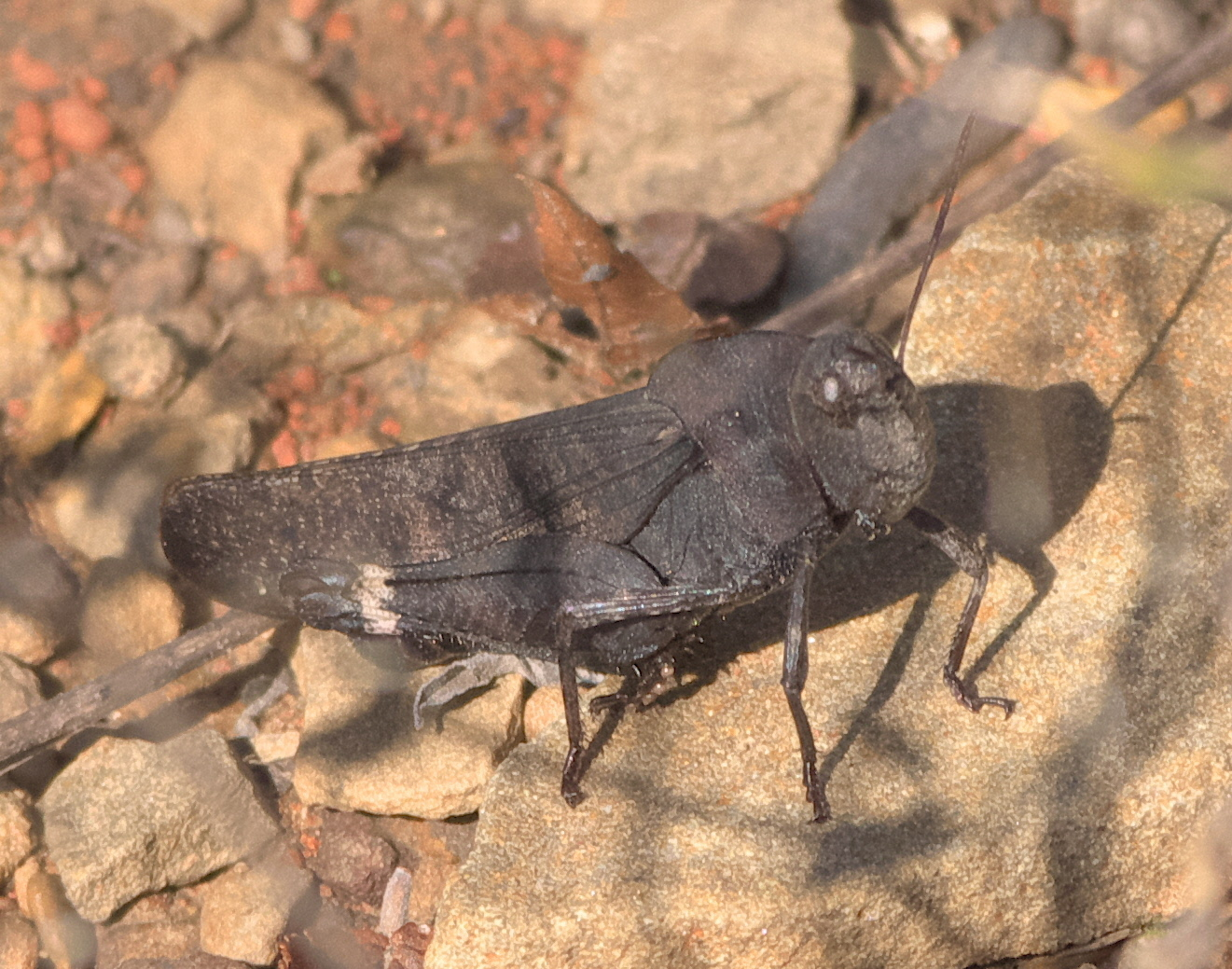
Arphia xanthoptera

1. Arphia Stål, 1873
2. Lactista Saussure, 1884 (synonym Rehnita)
3. Leuronotina Hebard, 1932
4. Tomonotus Saussure, 1861

=== Tribe Bryodemini ===
Auth. Bei-Bienko 1930; distribution: mostly central Asia

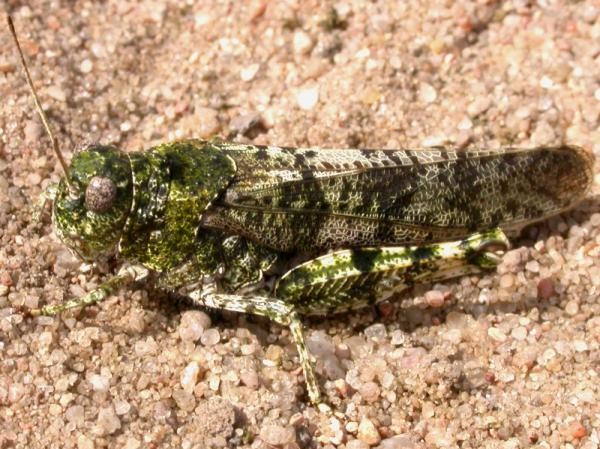
Bryodemella tuberculata

1. Andrea Mishchenko, 1989
2. Angaracris Bei-Bienko, 1930
3. Bryodema Fieber, 1853
4. Bryodemacris Benediktov, 1998
5. Bryodemella Yin, 1982 (Eastern Europe and temperate Asia)
6. Compsorhipis Saussure, 1889
7. Uvaroviola Bei-Bienko, 1930

=== Tribe Chortophagini ===
Auth. Otte, 1984; distribution: N. America

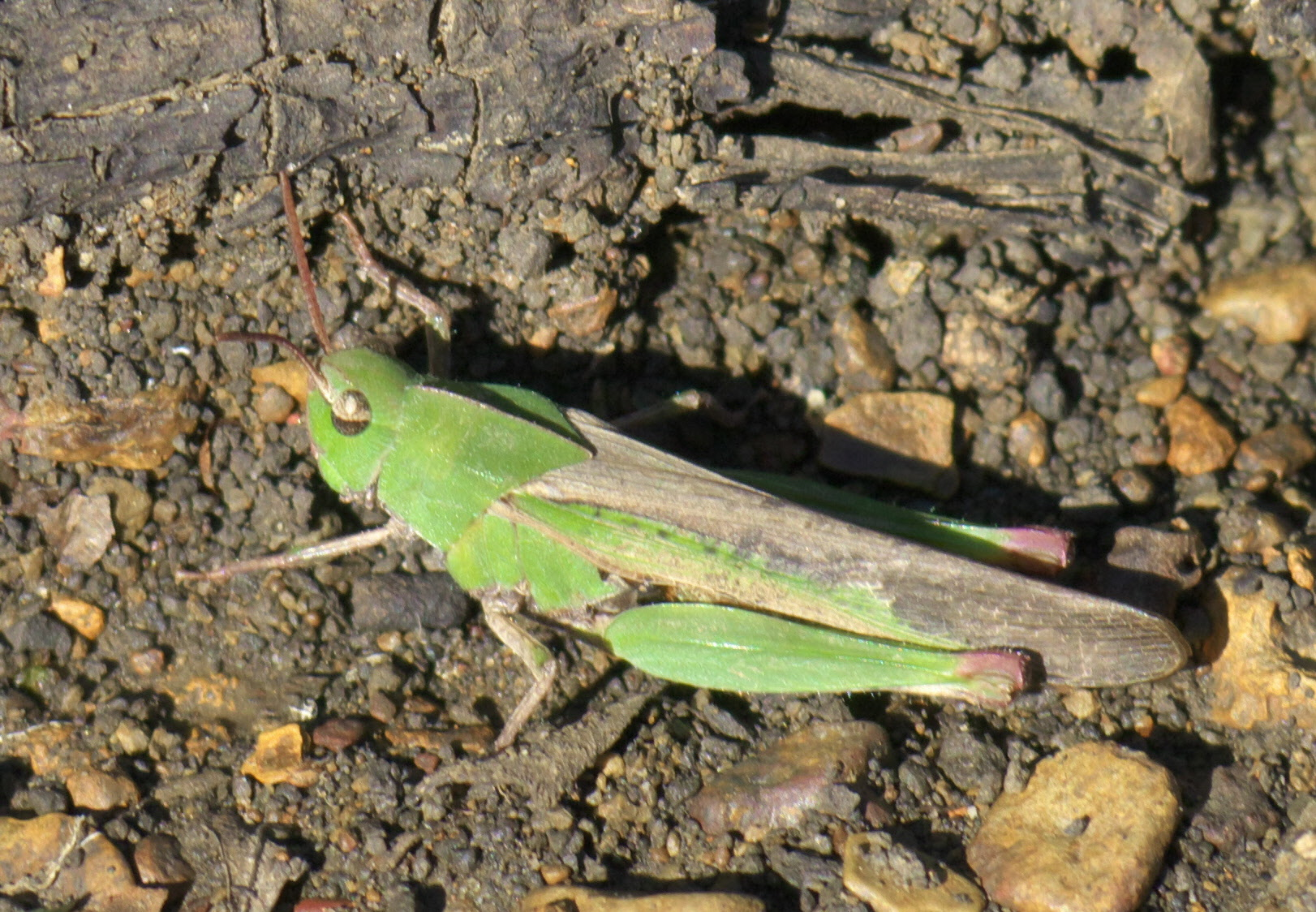
Chortophaga viridifasciata

1. Chimarocephala Scudder, 1875
2. Chortophaga Saussure, 1884
3. Encoptolophus Scudder, 1875
4. Nebulatettix Gómez, Lightfoot & Miller, 2012
5. Shotwellia Gurney, 1940

=== Tribe Epacromiini ===
Auth. Brunner von Wattenwyl 1893; distribution: Africa, Europe, Asia through to New Caledonia

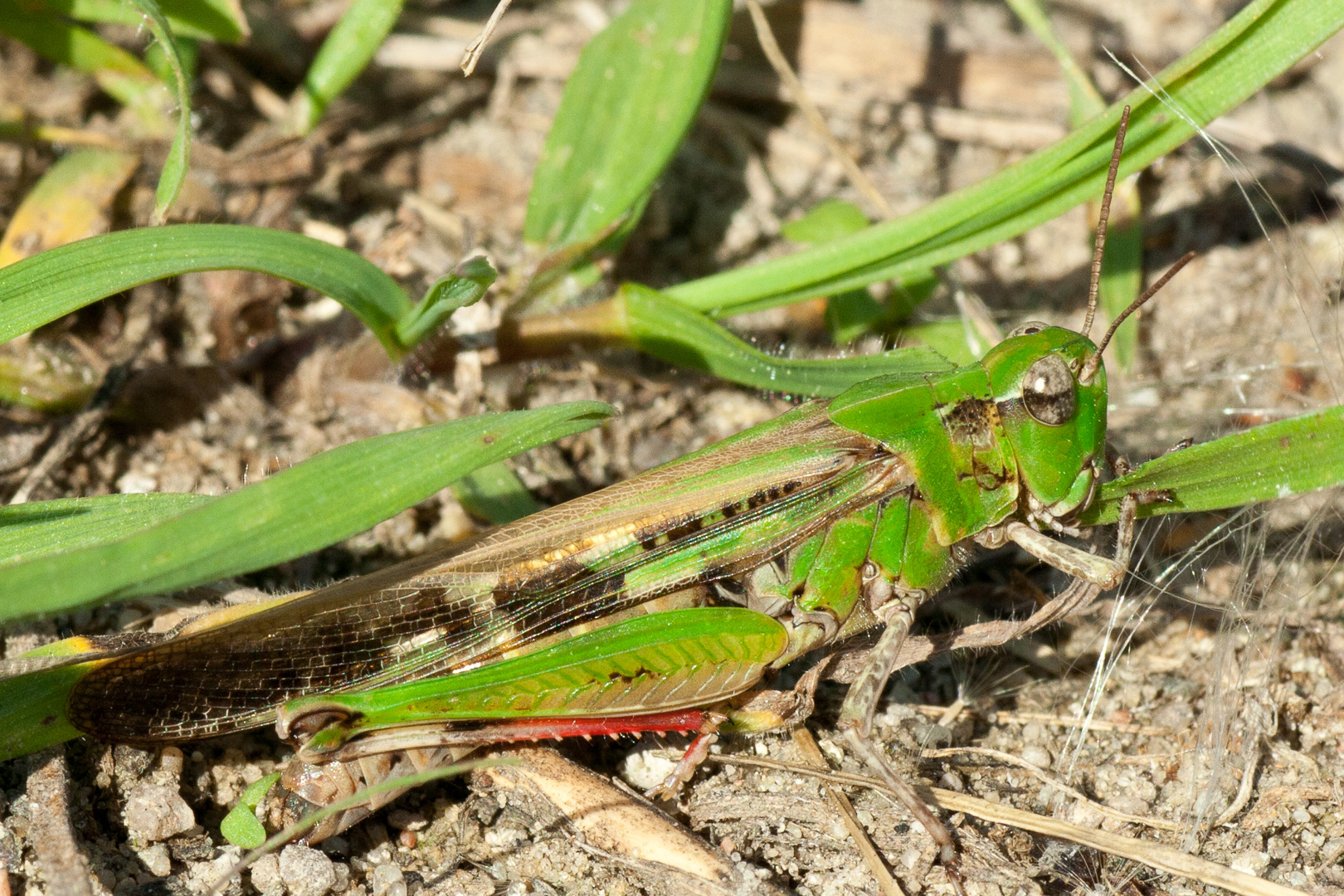
Aiolopus thalassinus

1. Aiolopus Fieber, 1853
2. Demirsoyus Sirin & Çiplak, 2004
3. Epacromius Uvarov, 1942
4. Heteropternis Stål, 1873
5. Hilethera Uvarov, 1923
6. Jasomenia Bolívar, 1914
7. Paracinema Fischer, 1853
8. Parahilethera Zheng & Ren, 2007
9. Platypygius Uvarov, 1942

=== Tribe Hippiscini ===
Auth. Otte, 1984; distribution: Americas

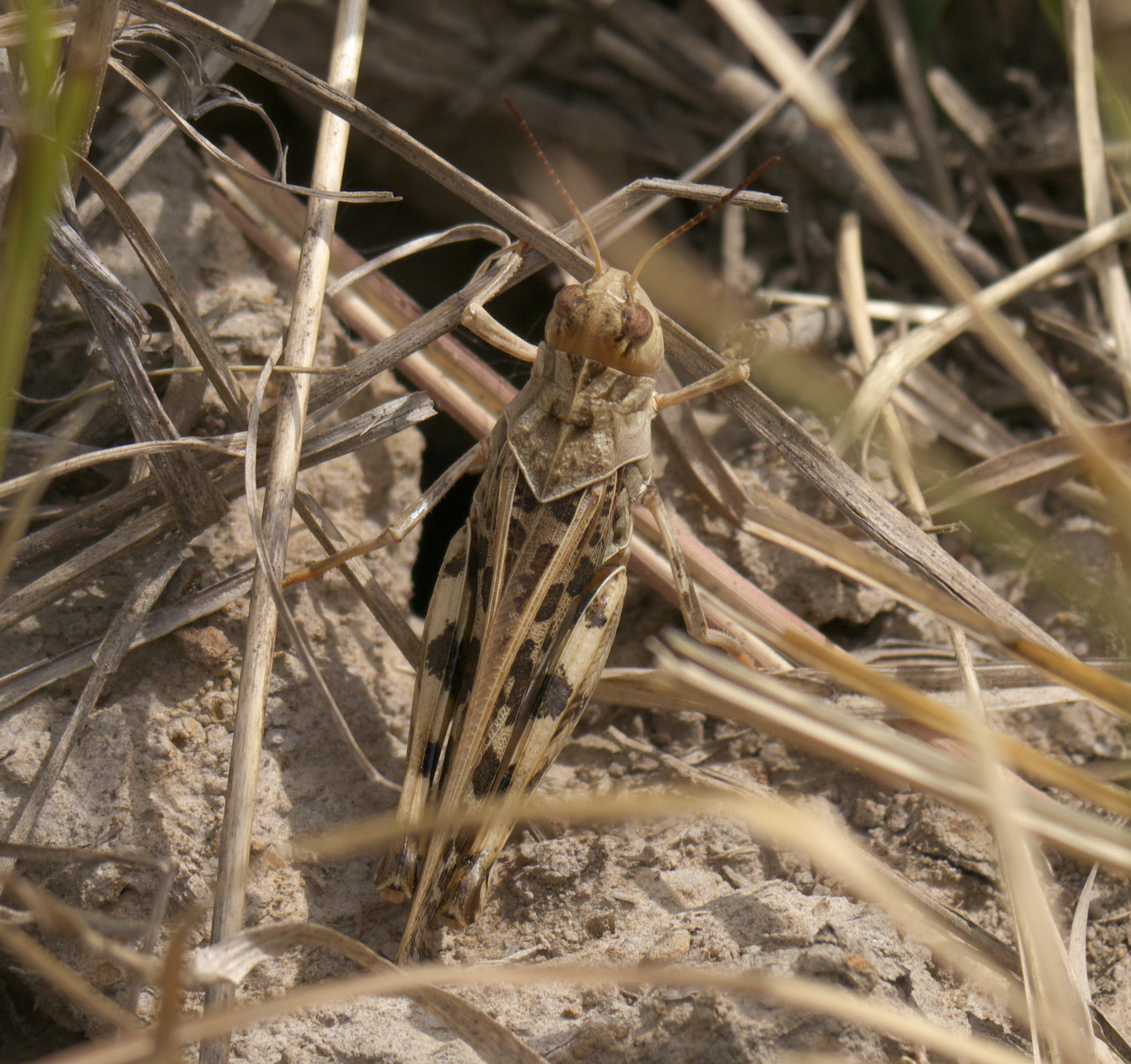
Hippiscus ocelote

- Agymnastus Scudder, 1897
- Camnula Stål, 1873
- Cratypedes Scudder, 1876
- Hadrotettix Scudder, 1876
- Heliastus Saussure, 1884
- Hippiscus Saussure, 1861 (monotypic)
- Leprus Saussure, 1861
- Pardalophora Saussure, 1884
- Sticthippus Scudder, 1892
- Xanthippus Saussure, 1884

=== Tribe Locustini ===
Auth. Kirby, 1825; distribution: Africa, Europe, Asia, Australia

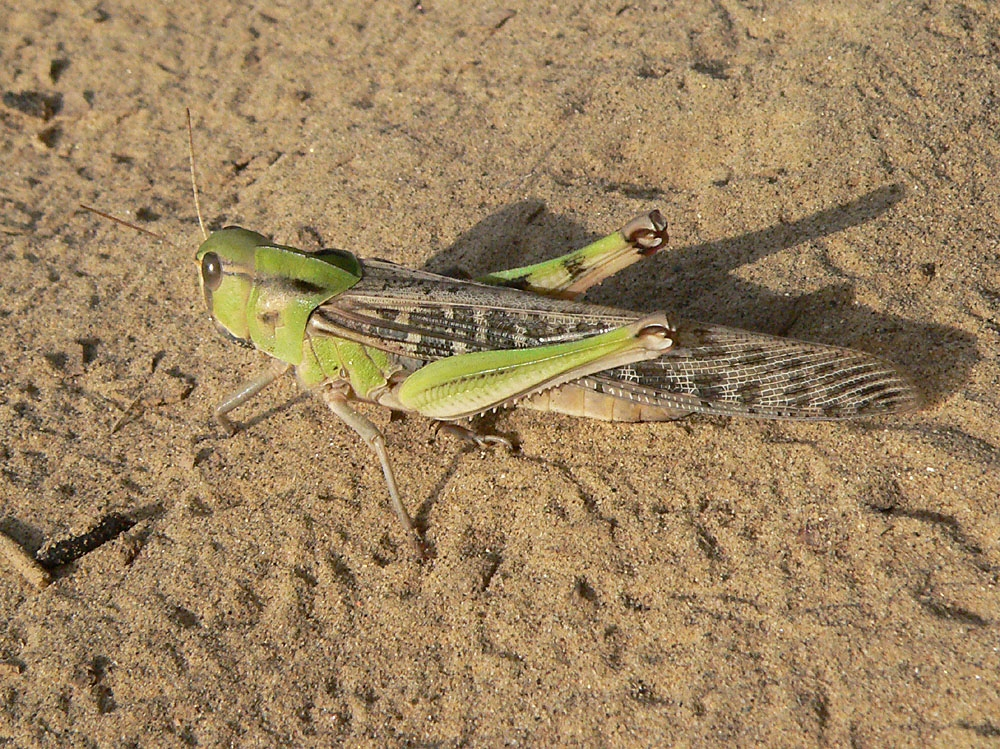
Locusta migratoria migratorioides female (solitary)

subtribe Locustina Kirby, 1825

1. Locusta Linnaeus, 1758 (monotypic)
2. Oedaleus Fieber, 1853
3. Psophus Fieber, 1853 - monotypic Psophus stridulus

subtribe undetermined

1. Brunnerella Saussure, 1888
2. Chifanicus Benediktov, 2001
3. Gastrimargus Saussure, 1884
4. Grammoscapha Uvarov, 1942
5. Locustana Uvarov, 1921
6. Pternoscirta Saussure, 1884
7. Ptetica Saussure, 1884
8. Pycnodictya Stål, 1873
9. Pyrgodera Fischer von Waldheim, 1846
10. Scintharista Saussure, 1884

=== Tribe Macherocerini ===
Auth. Otte, 1995; distribution: N. America (monotypic)

1. Machaerocera Saussure, 1859

=== Tribe Oedipodini ===
Auth. Walker, 1871; distribution: N. Africa, Europe, Asia

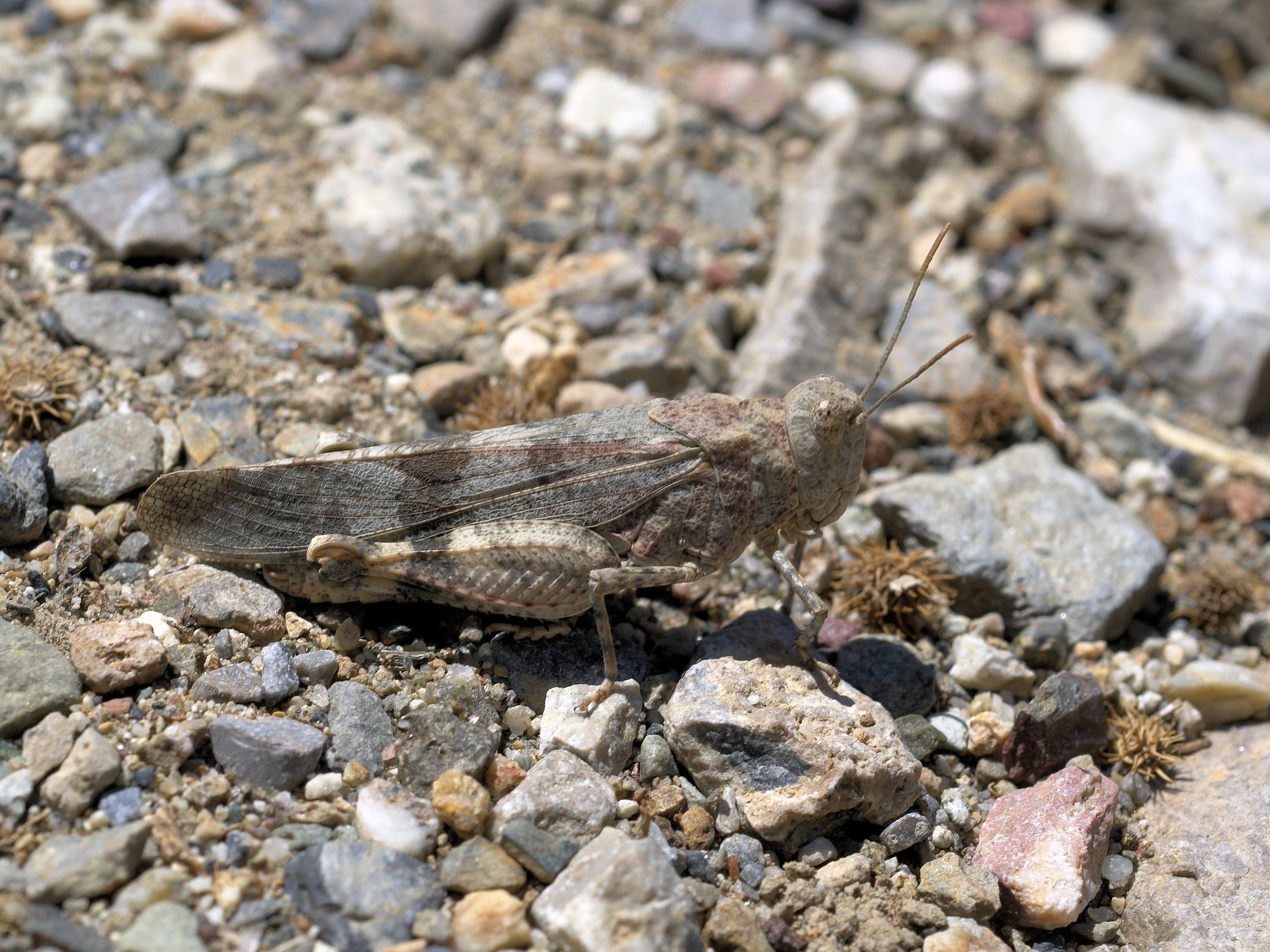
Oedipoda caerulescens

1. Celes Saussure, 1884
2. Mioscirtus Saussure, 1888
3. Ochyracris Zheng, 1991
4. Oedipoda Latreille, 1829
5. Oedipodacris Willemse, 1932

=== Tribe Parapleurini ===
Auth. Brunner von Wattenwyl 1893 (synonym Parapleuri); distribution: N. America, Europe, Asia

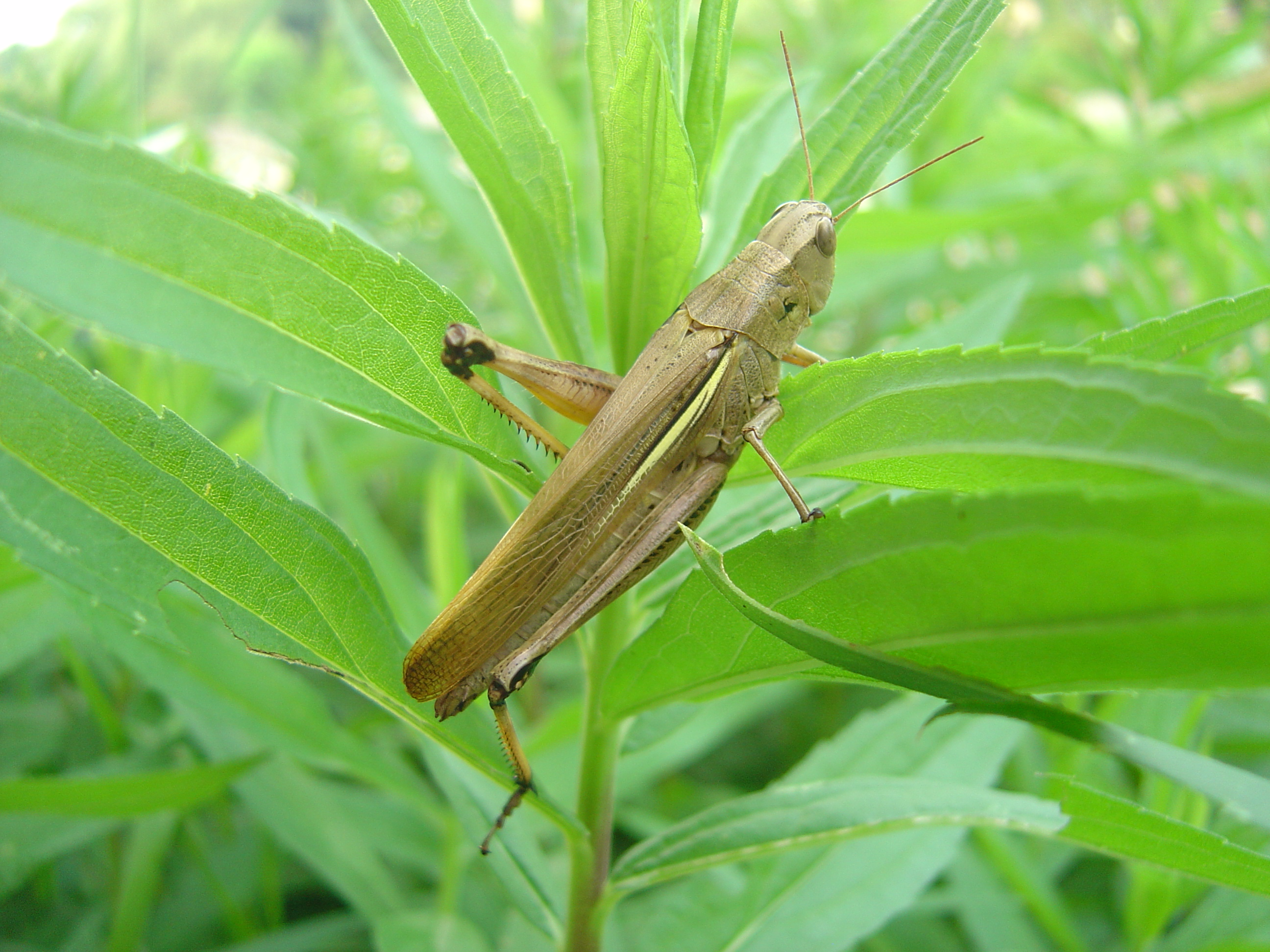
Stethophyma magister

1. Ceracris Walker, 1870
2. Ceracrisoides Liu, 1985
3. Formosacris Willemse, 1951
4. Mecostethus Fieber, 1852
5. Parapleurodes Ramme, 1941
6. Stethophyma Fischer, 1853
7. Yiacris Zheng & Chen, 1993

=== Tribe Psinidiini ===
Auth. Otte, 1984; distribution: N. America

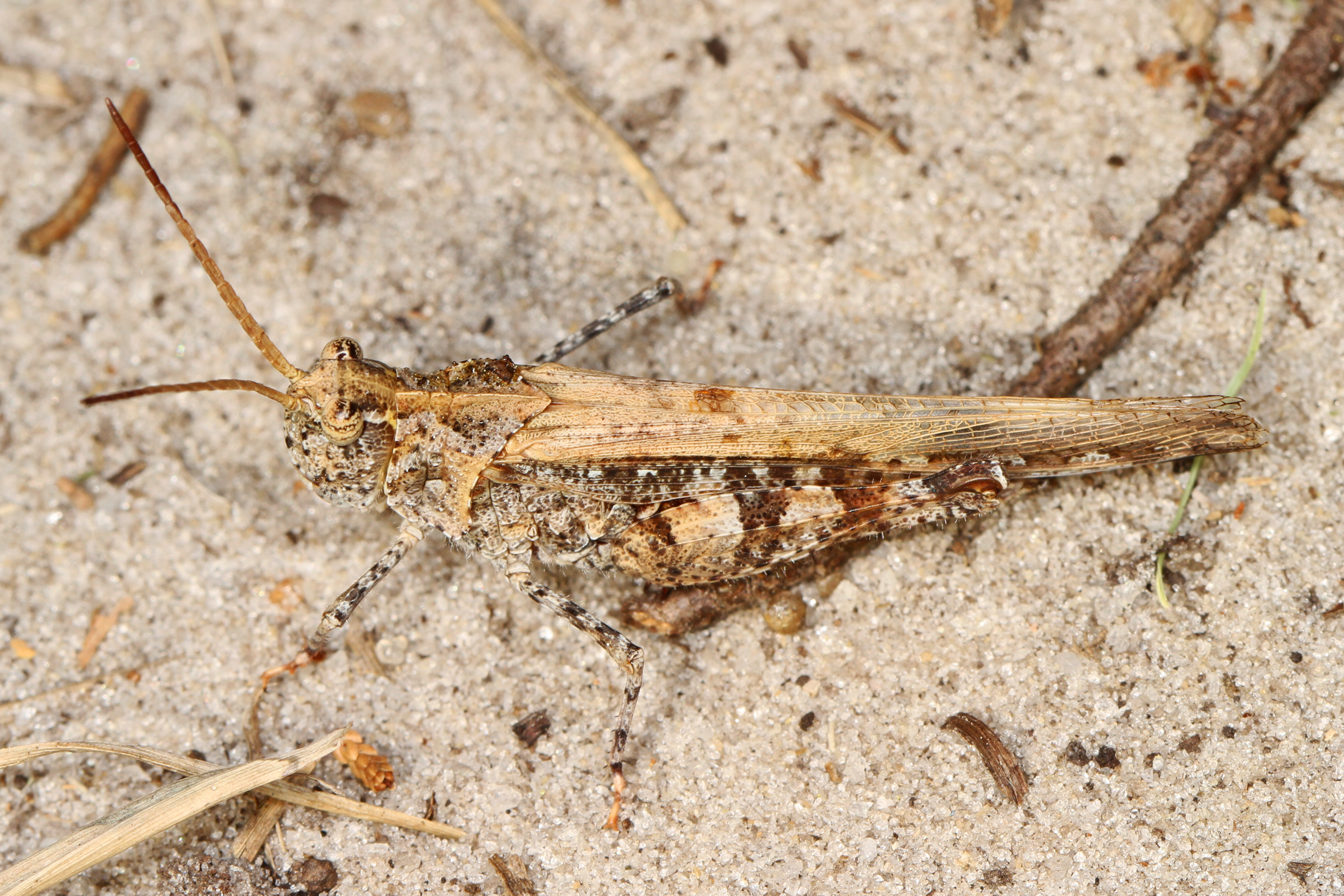
Psinidia fenestralis

- Derotmema Scudder, 1876
- Hippopedon Saussure, 1861 (synonym Platylactista)
- Mestobregma Scudder, 1876
- Metator McNeill, 1901
- Psinidia Stål, 1873
- Trachyrhachys Scudder, 1876
- Trepidulus McNeill, 1901

=== Tribe Sphingonotini ===
Auth. Johnston, 1956; distribution: worldwide, esp. Africa, Europe, Asia

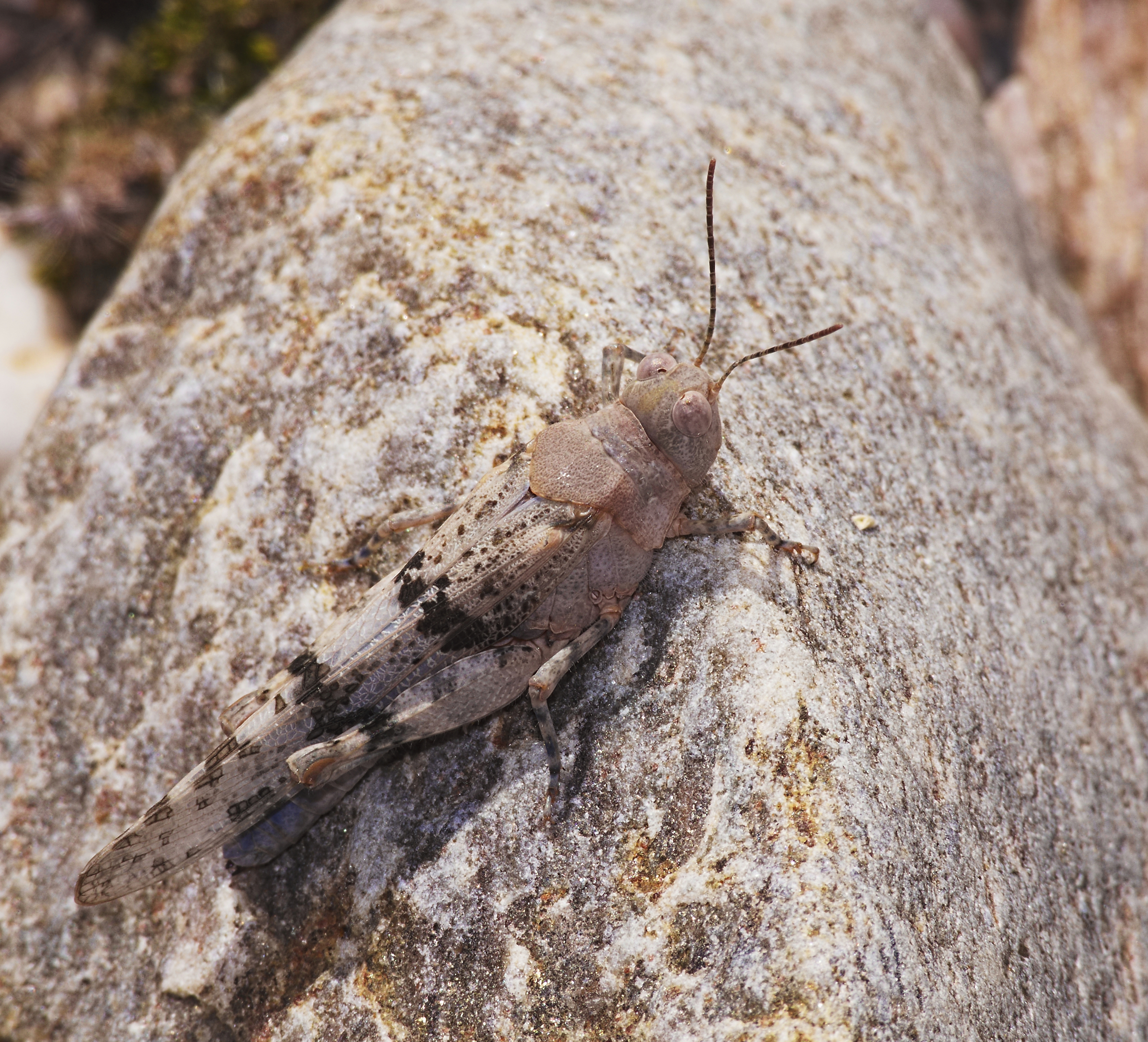
Sphingonotus caerulans

1. Conipoda Saussure, 1884
2. Cophotylus Krauss, 1902
3. Eusphingoderus Bei-Bienko, 1950
4. Eusphingonotus Bey-Bienko, 1950
5. Heliopteryx Uvarov, 1914
6. Helioscirtus Saussure, 1884
7. Hyalorrhipis Saussure, 1884
8. Microtes Scudder, 1900
9. Phaeonotus Popov, 1951
10. Pseudoceles Bolívar, 1899
11. Quadriverticis Zheng, 1999
12. Sphingoderus Bei-Bienko, 1950
13. Sphingonotus Fieber, 1852 - type species: Sphingonotus caerulans
14. Tetramerotropis Saussure, 1888
15. Thalpomena Saussure, 1884
16. Vosseleriana Uvarov, 1924

=== Tribe Trilophidiini ===
Auth. Shumakov 1963; distribution: Africa, Asia (monotypic tribe)

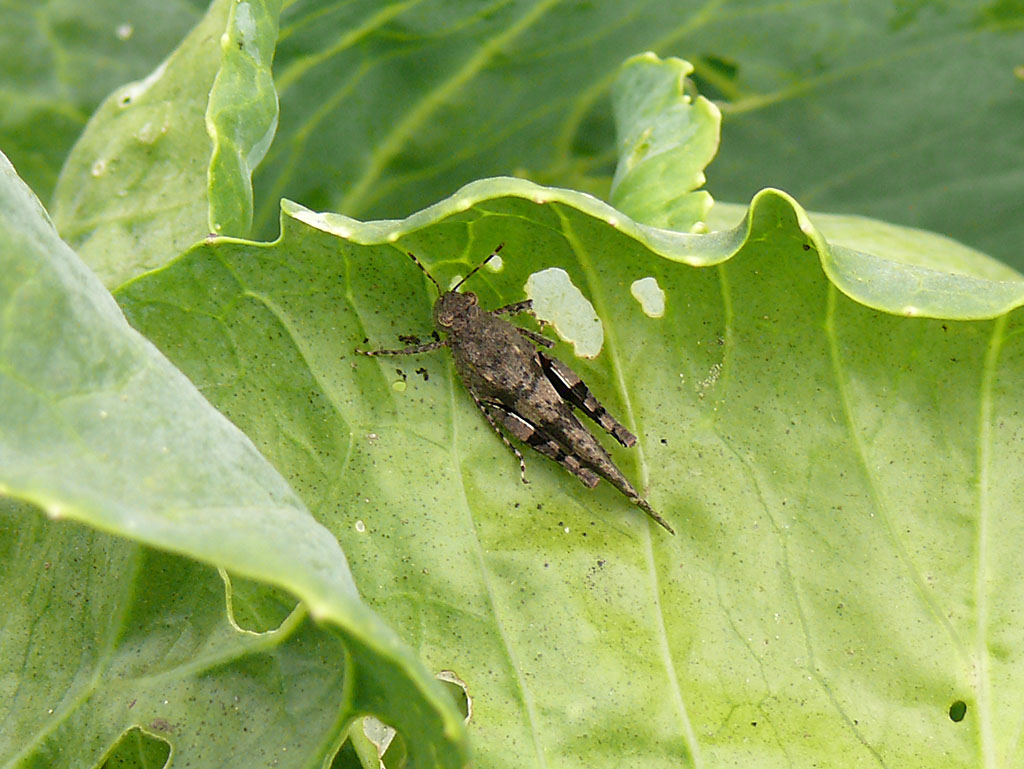
Trilophidia conturbata

1. Trilophidia Stål, 1873

=== Tribe Trimerotropini ===
Auth. Blatchley, 1920; distribution: Americas

1. Circotettix Scudder, 1876
2. Conozoa Saussure, 1884
3. Dissosteira Scudder, 1876
4. Spharagemon Scudder, 1875
5. Trimerotropis Stål, 1873

=== Tribe Tropidolophini ===
Auth. Otte, 1995; distribution: N. America (monotypic tribe)

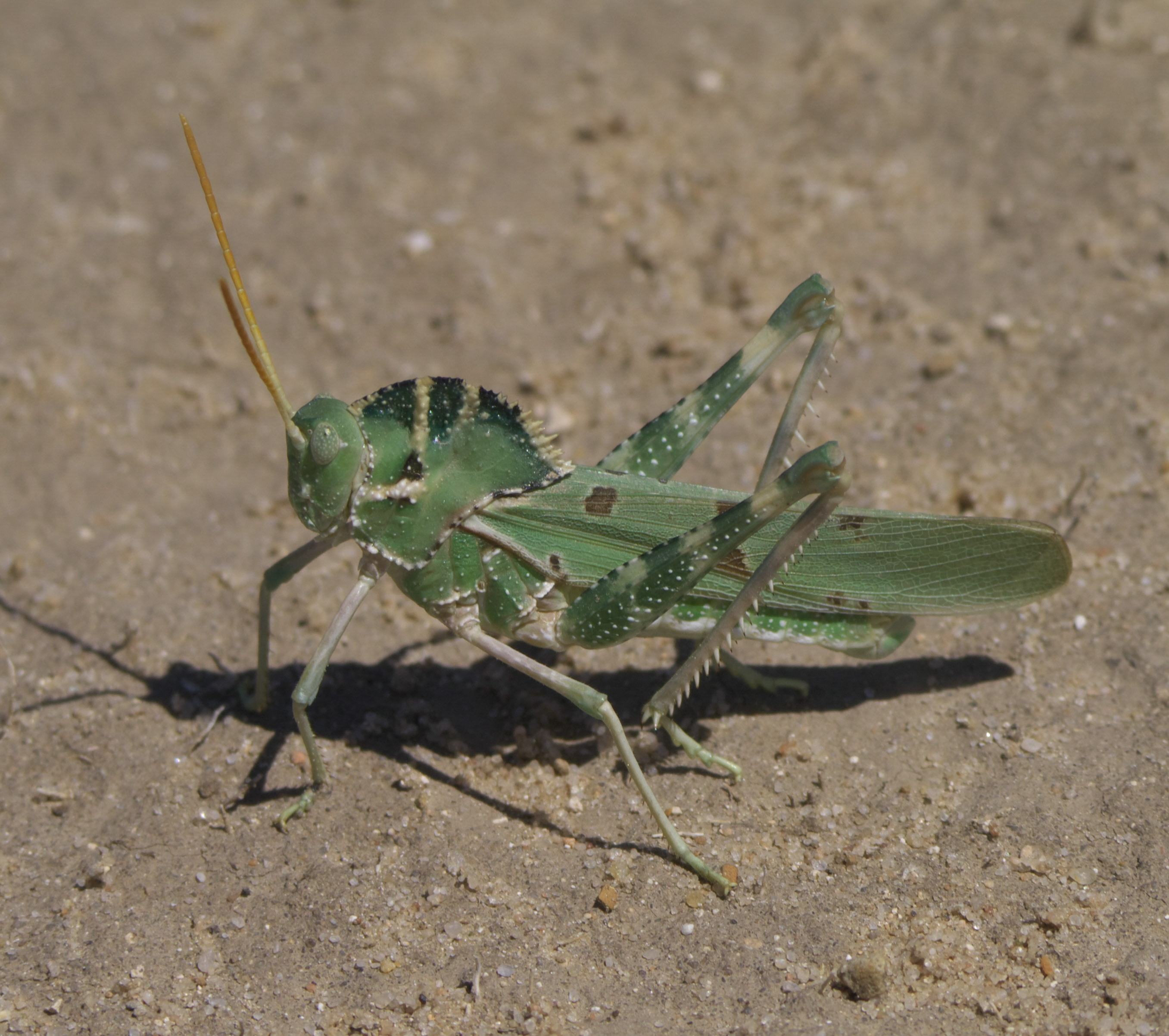
Tropidolophus formosus

1. Tropidolophus Thomas, 1873 - monotypic Tropidolophus formosus

=== Genera incertae sedis ===
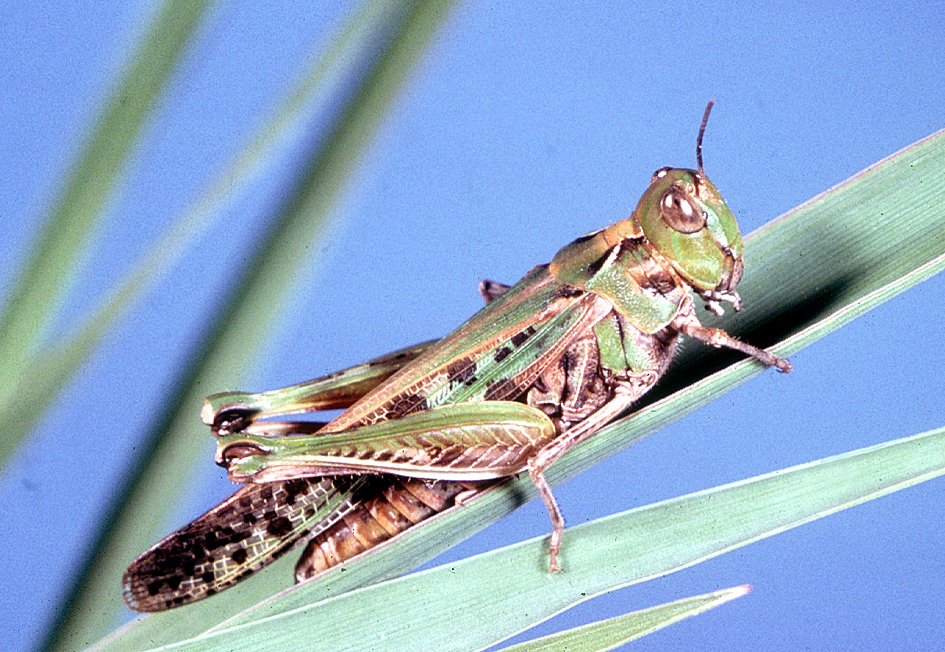
Chortoicetes terminifera

- Angaracrisoides Gong & Zheng, 2003
- Asphingoderus Bei-Bienko, 1950
- Atympanum Yin, 1982
- Aulocaroides Werner, 1913
- Aurilobulus Yin, 1979
- Austroicetes Uvarov, 1925
- Brancsikellus Berg, 1899
- Chloebora Saussure, 1884
- Chondronotulus Uvarov, 1956
- Chortoicetes Brunner von Wattenwyl, 1893
- Crinita Dirsh, 1949
- Cyanicaudata Yin, 1979
- Diraneura Scudder, 1897
- Dittopternis Saussure, 1884
- Elmisia Dirsh, 1949
- Eokingdonella Yin, 1984
- Eremoscopus Bei-Bienko, 1951
- Eurysternacris Chopard, 1947
- Fitzgeraldia Uvarov, 1952
- Flatovertex Zheng, 1981
- Granada Koçak & Kemal, 2008
- Homoeopternis Uvarov, 1953
- Humbe Bolívar, 1882
- Jinabia Uvarov, 1952
- Kinshaties Zheng, 1977
- Leptopternis Saussure, 1884
- Mecistopteryx Saussure, 1888
- Morphacris Walker, 1870
- Nepalacris Balderson & Yin, 1987
- Oreacris Bolívar, 1911
- Promesosternus Yin, 1982
- Pseudaiolopus Hollis, 1967
- Pycnocrania Uvarov, 1941
- Pycnodella Descamps, 1965
- Pycnodictya Stål, 1873
- Pycnostictus Saussure, 1884
- Qualetta Sjöstedt, 1921
- Rashidia Uvarov, 1933
- Tibetacris Chen, 1964
- Tmetonota Saussure, 1884
- Zimbabwea Miller, 1949
- †Mioedipoda Stidham & Stidham, 2000
- †Nymphacrida Zhang, Sun & Zhang, 1994
- †Oedemastopoda Zhang, Sun & Zhang, 1994

The genus Cibolacris was originally placed in Oedipodinae, and later moved to Gomphocerinae. The genus Stethophyma is traditionally included in Oedipodinae, but North American authors in particular sometimes place it in the Gomphocerinae or Acridinae. Some authors place all members of Oedipodinae within the subfamily Acridinae, and there has been much confusion and debate about the limits and relationships of the two subfamilies.
