= Konservat-Lagerstätte Menat =

Fossil site in France

- Stratigraphic range: Late Paleocene; 59 Ma
- Type: Site
- Overlies: Migmatite

Lithology
- Primary: Clay, Shale

Location
- Coordinates: 46°06′16″N 2°54′19″E
- Country: France

Type section
- Named for: Menat, Puy-de-Dôme
- Konservat-Lagerstätte Menat (France)

The Konservat-Lagerstätte Menat (French pronunciation: [məna]) is a Konservat-Lagerstätte located in France dating to the mid-late Paleocene. Though the fossiliferous beds of the sites have been known for a long time, with the first large study being published in 1940, Menat has had much less study than other similar deposits. Since the 1980s, a number of excavations have been done by various museums. However, due to the loss of the original sites, most of this is a result of multiple excavations done in the area. The fauna of the lagerstätte is largely made up of insects, but various vertebrates such as mammals, reptiles, and birds have been described from the sites. These fossil were preserved in what was a volcanic maar lake surrounded by a forest with evidence of common forest fires.

== History ==
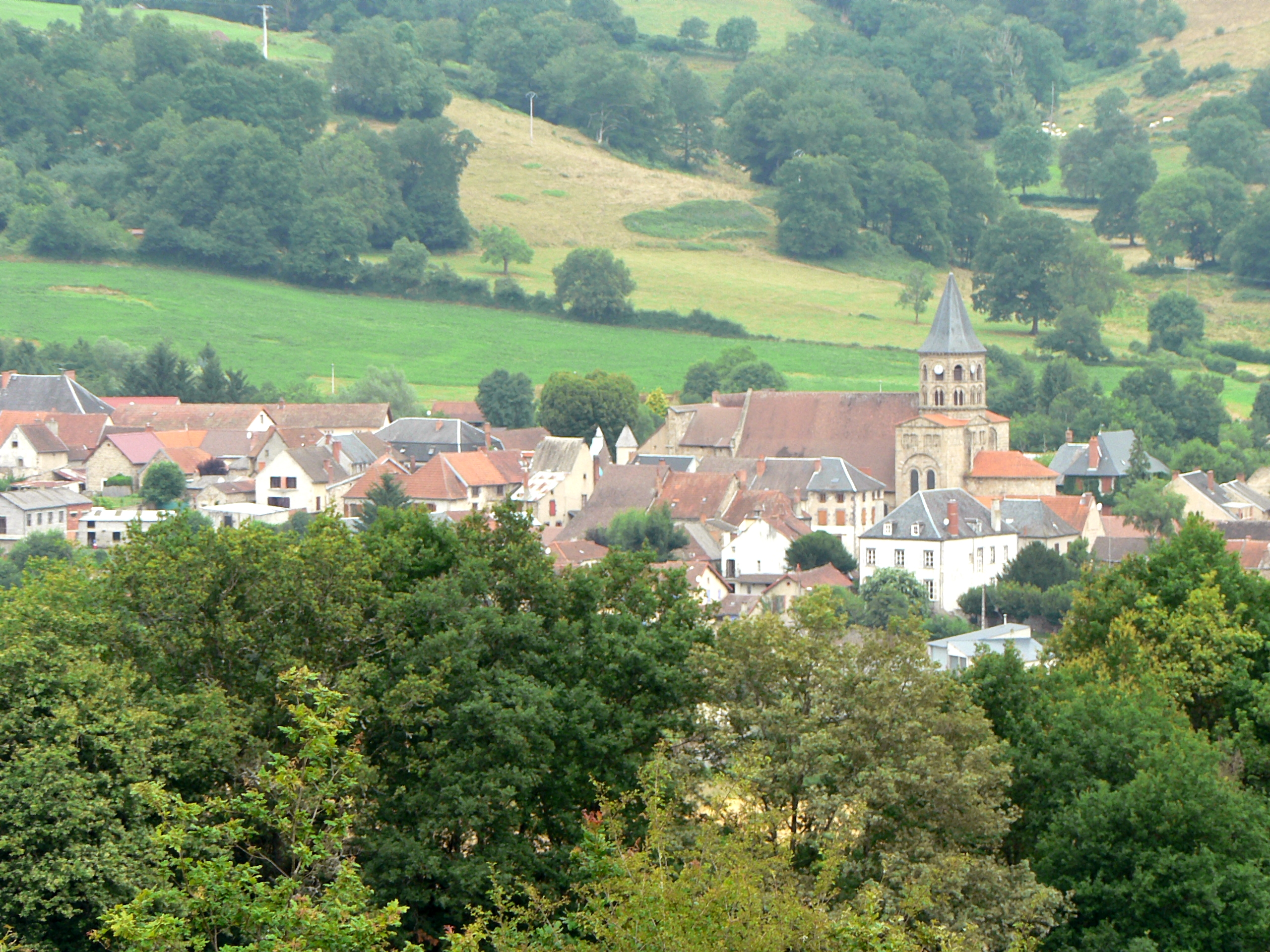
The Village of Menat.

Before the area was known for the Konservat-Lagerstätte Menat, the area nearby was known for its diatomite quarries which were mined until 1873. After this point, a factory was built outside of the town to avoid intoxication associated with the fumes produced. A number of things were produced using this sediment including abrasives and pigments, and later dynamite. In 1940, Piton published a study of the fossils that laid the groundwork for others in the future. However, similar to other specimens, a large amount of the fossils he described would be lost in World War II with holotypes being found in a number of different collections today.

By the 1950s, mining at the quarries concluded with the factory later closing in 1964. Even before the mine closed, various people were collecting fossils from the mines associated with the factory. Around this time, the main quarry (known as "Les Grelins") was turned into a pond with another quarry (known as "La Mer") was filled and overlain with a road. Even though the main quarry was turned into a pond, a number of fossil collectors would travel to the site to collect specimens. This happened so often that in 1979, municipal council prohibited the collection of fossils to protect the site with a local museum being created soon after. During the 1980s, some excavations of the main site were done by the Muséum National d'Histoire Naturelle though this would not last very long. In 1988, the site became a Regional Natural Reserve with no excavations happening at "Les Grelins" since then.

In the late 1990s and early 2000s, the paleontological association Rhinopolis began more work at the quarry. During this time, the group also opened a new site known as "Maison de retraite". In 2009, the village worked with Paléovergne to preserve the paleontological heritage of the area. By 2010, "Maison de retraite" was closed to open a retirement home and a new site known as "Les Lavandes" was opened in 2011. In 2012, a test pit titled "Menat 1" was opened with the main purpose of studying the stratigraphy of the site with another test site known as "Menat 2" being opened in 2013. The most recent site to be excavated is the "Stream site" in 2014 which has much better preservation than the two test pits.

== Geology ==
The Konservat-Lagerstätte Menat is known from three more recently excavated sites which are the main source of more recent geological descriptions. The more well-known and oldest bed, referred to as "Menat 1", is located on the eastern region of the maar lake which was preserved at the site. Menat 1 has a total thickness of 5.82 metres (19.1 ft) and is made up of nine greyish to white silicified claystone beds which range in thickness from 3–20 centimetres (1.2–7.9 in). The upper clay beds are weathered at the top. Fossils are still present in these beds, but the preservation is worse than in the silicified beds. During excavations that took place in 2013 and 2014, a second site referred to as "Menat 2" was first worked on. This site is located near the eastern entrance to the village of Menat and has a thickness of 6 metres (20 ft). Similar to the first site, the upper clay beds were weathered, but the clay differs more throughout the site. Based on the differences in lithology under these weather beds, Menat 2 has been split into three intervals being A,B, and C.

Interval	Thickness	Lithology
A	1.68 metres (5.5 ft)	Dark grey to black in color that is finely laminated with strata from this interval only being weakly weathered.
B	1.37 metres (4.5 ft)	Grey to dark grey in color with the lowest section of the interval being made up of claystone that is a few centimeters in thickness which are not a result of diatomites.
C	0.95 metres (3.1 ft)	Undistinguished with noticeable lamination.

The third site, known as the "Steam Site", was first referenced in the literature in 2018 and has been noted to have better preservation than the other two sites. The beds that make up the site consist of dark, organic clays and is suggested to be correlated to the "Les Grelins" and "La Mer" quarries. Both charcoal and soot have been found at every horizon of Menat. Fossils found at these sites are preserved on what has been labeled as spongo-diatomites. However, a more recent study that looked into the composition of these layers found no evidence of diatom sclerites or sponge spicules being present.

=== Dating ===
The original dated of Menat was the mid to late Paleocene, with this being based on the presence of a fossil primate. Later palynological studies have suggested either a Thanetian or Selandian age. However, the more recent dating based on basalts and tuffs near Menat gave an "average age" of the Thanetian-Ypresian boundary. This age has been referenced as the age of the fossil maar lake itself though this has faced criticism due to the lack of correlation between the lake deposits and the sediments being dated. The most recent papers referencing the date of the site place the age as 59 mya based on pollen. In contrast to this however, macrofloral fossils suggest a slightly older age of 60-61 mya.

== Paleoenvironment ==
Konservat-Lagerstätte Menat represents a volcanic maar lake that has been estimated as measuring 1 kilometre (0.62 mi) in diameter. Based on the algae found at the sites, there would have been no inflow from rivers with there seemingly only being a few shallower areas on the coasts. Outside of these small areas around the margins, it is most likely the maar lake would have been relatively deep. This lake would have been surrounded by a largely deciduous forest, climate in the area would have been temperate to subtropical with cool winters being present. Though humid, the amount of charcoal and soot found at Menat suggests that forest fires would happen often in the surrounding forest. Based on the amount of insect trace fossils found on leaf fossils, the ecosystem was already healthy, even with it being only a few million years after the mass extinction event. This suggests that regions further away from the asteroid impact recovered faster than those in regions like North America.

== Paleofauna ==
=== Vertebrates ===
==== Actinopterygii ====
Ray-finned fish of the Konservat-Lagerstätte Menat
Genus	Species	Notes	Image
Cyclurus	C. valenciennesi	A rare amiid with a short body that has specimens reaching up to 45 centimetres (18 in) found at the site.	
Properca	P. angusta	A percichthyid with specimens at the site ranging from 35–40 millimetres (1.4–1.6 in).	
Thaumaturus	T. brongniarti	A thaumaturid that was originally placed within the genus Chela.	

==== Amphibia ====
Amphibians of the Konservat-Lagerstätte Menat
Genus	Species	Notes	Image
Ranidae indet.		A poorly described ranid mentioned in 1940 by Piton similar to Rana temporaria, though having longer hindlimbs.	

==== Aves ====
Birds of the Konservat-Lagerstätte Menat
Genus	Species	Notes	Image
Aves, gen et sp. A		An indeterminate bird known from a specimen of legs and tail feathers that is the largest bird found at Menat. Similar to other birds, the preservation of the material is too poor to assign it to a genus.	
Aves, gen. et sp. indet. B		An indeterminate bird known from a specimen with a skull, neck vertebrae, and the right wing. The preservation of the specimen is too poor to identify it to genus level.	
cf. Songziidae gen. et. sp. indet.		A possible songziid known from a specimen lacking parts of the hind limbs. Unlike its possible close relative, the bird does not possess the greatly elongated toes.	
cf. Halcyornithidae/Messelasturidae gen. et. sp. indet.		A messelasturid or halcyornithid known from an almost complete specimen, the skull is large for the bird's size with a beak that was tall towards the base. Though largely complete, the poor preservation of the specimen does not allow for it to be assigned to a genus.	

==== Choristodera ====
Choristoderes of the Konservat-Lagerstätte Menat
Genus	Species	Notes	Image
Lazarussuchus	L. sp.	A choristodere known from a well preserved specimen with soft tissue preservation. The specimen was not assigned to a specific species.	

==== Crocodilia ====
Crocodilians of the Konservat-Lagerstätte Menat
Genus	Species	Notes	Image
Menatalligator	M. bergouniouxi	An alligatorid known from a now-lost specimen made up of an incomplete skull and almost complete postcranium similar to Diplocynodon.	

==== Mammalia ====
Mammals of the Konservat-Lagerstätte Menat
Genus	Species	Notes	Image
Cynodictis	C. sp.	An amphicyonid that has suggested to not be assignable to the current genus due to the lack of teeth.	
Leptictis	L?. sp.	A specimen known from a complete, articulated skeleton with soft tissue preserved that was originally placed as in "insectivore". The current placement under the genus is questioned that a reevaluation of the material has yet to be done.	
Plesiadapis	P. insignis	A plesiadapid known from an incomplete skeleton with fur preserved found at the site. When originally described, the material was placed under its own genus, Menatotherium.	
Sciuroides	S. sp.	A pseudosciurid that has suggested to not be assignable to the current genus due to the lack of teeth.	

==== Squamata ====
Squamates of the Konservat-Lagerstätte Menat
Genus	Species	Notes	Image
Squamata indet.		A squamate originally assigned to Proiguana loevidens known from a now-lost specimen made up of an incomplete skull that has been compared to what is now Plesiolacerta.	

==== Testudines ====
Turtles of the Konservat-Lagerstätte Menat
Genus	Species	Notes	Image
Berruchelus	B. russelli	A paracryptodiran known from a fragment of the carapace found at the site that is closely related to Compsemys.	
Trionychidae		Specimens from softshell turtles found at the site with morphology dissimilar to multiple genera in the family. The affinities of the specimens, represented by shell and limb material, has yet to be determined.	

=== Insects ===
==== Blattodea ====
Blattodeans of the Konservat-Lagerstätte Menat
Genus	Species	Notes	Image
Eoplaneta	E. desforesti	A blattidae known from a specimen with a body length of 19 millimetres (0.75 in).	
Prochaeradodis	P. enigmaticus	A roach known from a specimen made up of parts of all of the wings, segments of the thorax, and head that was originally described as a mantis.	
Thermopsis	T. piacentinii	A kalotermitid known from a mostly complete specimen with a body length of 22.5 millimetres (0.89 in).	
Zeunera	Z. madeleinae	A blattidae known from two specimens with a body length of 23 millimetres (0.91 in).	

==== Coleoptera ====
Coleopterans of the Konservat-Lagerstätte Menat
Genus	Species	Notes	Image
Ancylochira	A. oligostriata	A tenebrionid known from a single specimen lacking a head.	
Archaeoheilus	A. gallicus	A curculionid known from a specimen lacking antennae with a total body length of 5.0 millimetres (0.20 in).	
Cainomerga	C. brevicornis	A cupedid known from a specimen lacking parts of the antennae and limbs, having a body length of 18.3 millimetres (0.72 in).	
Cainomerga	C. fraternus	A cupedid known from a mostly complete specimen, the body length of the incomplete specimen is 14.6 millimetres (0.57 in).	
Cainomerga	C. immaculatus	A cupedid known from a complete male specimen with a body length of 18.7 millimetres (0.74 in).	
Cainomerga	C. palaeocenicus	A cupedid known from a mostly complete specimen with a body length of 16.5 millimetres (0.65 in).	
Cainomerga	C. ponti	A cupedid known from a mostly complete specimen with a body length of 18.5 millimetres (0.73 in).	
Cainomerga	C. sp. 1	A cupedid known from an incomplete specimen with a body length of 12.2 millimetres (0.48 in).	
Cainomerga	C. sp. 2	A cupedid known from an incomplete specimen lacking the abdomen, legs, and antennae with a body length of 12.1 millimetres (0.48 in)	
Cainomerga	C. sp. 3	A cupedid known from an elytra measuring 6.4 millimetres (0.25 in).	
Centrinus	C. longipes	A weevil belonging to the family Curculionidae	
Chlorida	C. magnifica	A beetle originally assigned to the family Cerambycidae, though may actually be a chrysomelid based on a number of features.	
Cryptarcha	?C. semiglobosa	A nitidulid known from a single male specimen with a body length of 5.2 millimetres (0.20 in).	
Cryptohelops	C. menaticus	A tenebrionid known from a single well preserved male specimen with a body length of 7.0 millimetres (0.28 in).	
Cupes	C. distinctissimus	A cupedid known from a mostly complete specimen with a body length of 8.3 millimetres (0.33 in).	
Cupes	C. manifestus	A cupedid known from multiple specimens with a body length of 6.2 millimetres (0.24 in).	
Cupes	C. simillimus	A cupedid known from a single specimen lacking the posterior portion with a body length of 6.3 millimetres (0.25 in).	
Eocenostenus	E. vanja	A staphylinid known from a complete specimen with a body length of 5.4 millimetres (0.21 in). Based on the specimen, the beetle would have been dark green or shiny-blue.	
Gallopsis	G. perita	A chrysomelid known from two fairly complete specimens, the beetle has a body length of 14 millimetres (0.55 in). It was the oldest sagrine beetle at time of publication.	
Hipporhinus	H. ventricosus	A curculionid weevil known from a poorly preserved specimen, it is the only Eocene member of the tribe Naupactini to be known outside of Baltic Amber.	
Lixus	L. ligniticus	A weevil belonging to the family Curculionidae	
Megopis	M. lineolatus	A cerambycid known from a single elytra that most likely is not able to be assigned to the genus or family.	
Menatoraea	M. angustitibialis	A nitidulid known from two specimens with a body length of 6.0 millimetres (0.24 in).	
Menatoraea	M. gracilis	A nitidulid known from two specimens with a body length of 6.3 millimetres (0.25 in).	
Menatoraea	M. laticollis	A nitidulid known from a single specimen with a body length of 4.0 millimetres (0.16 in).	
Menatoraea	M. sp. 1	A nitidulid known from a single specimen with a body length of 4.7 millimetres (0.19 in).	
Menatoraea	M. sp. 2	A nitidulid known from a single specimen with a body length of 3.7 millimetres (0.15 in).	
Menatoraea	M. typica	A nitidulid known from three specimens, all lacking limbs and antennae. The body length of these specimens are 4.1 millimetres (0.16 in).	
Menatops	M. bartenevi	A cupedid known from a fairly complete specimen with a body length of 7.2 millimetres (0.28 in).	
Menatops	M. orbiculatus	A cupedid known from a single specimen that was originally described as within the genus of Cupes. The body length of the beetle was 9.1 millimetres (0.36 in).	
Menatorhis	M. elegans	A curculionid known from a mostly complete imprint of a female specimen.	
Monohammus	M. orientalis	A cerambycid known from one specimen that may or may not be actually in the family.	
Nitoraeopsis	N. mixta	A nitidulid known from a single male specimen with a body length of 3.4 millimetres (0.13 in).	
Palaeobasanus	P. neli	A medium-sized tenebrionid known from a largely complete specimen with a body length of 7.5 millimetres (0.30 in).	
Palaeoncoderes	P. eocenicus	A cerambycid known from two specimens with a body length of 30 millimetres (1.2 in).	
Palaeoncoderes	P. piacentini	A cerambycid known from one specimen.	
Palaeolycra	P. palaeocenica	A nitidulid known from one male specimen with a body length of 4.0 millimetres (0.16 in).	
Palaeosclerum	P. pohli	A tenebrionid known from a single incomplete specimen with a body length of 4.3 millimetres (0.17 in).	
Palaeosphryon	P. menatensis	A very large cerambycid known from a fairly complete though distorted specimen with a body length of 70 millimetres (2.8 in).	
Passandra	P. plenaria	A passandrid known from a mostly complete specimen with a body length of 11.8 millimetres (0.46 in).	
Perapion	P. menatensis	A brentid known from a mostly complete female specimen that is similar to the modern P. antiquum though it is slightly larger and has a straight rostrum.	
Petropsis	P. rostrata	An ithycerid known from a mostly complete specimen which has been suggested to possibly be male. The genus is the only known Cenozoic member of the subfamily Chilecarinae found outside of North America.	
Prionus	P. sinuatus	A cerambycid which may not be assignable to the family, with more recent papers suggesting that it could also be a chrysomelid.	
Prolamioides	P. bituminosus	A cerambycid known from two specimens with a body length of 22 millimetres (0.87 in).	
Prolamioides	P. brunneus	A cerambycid known from a single specimen.	
Protrogosita	P. distincta	A trogossitid known from a single specimen with a body length of 12.5 millimetres (0.49 in).	
Soronia	?S. menatensis	A nitidulid known from a single specimen lacking the legs and antennae with a body length of 6.0 millimetres (0.24 in).	
Soronia	?S.	A nitidulid known from a single specimen much smaller than ?S. menatensis, having a body length of 3.7 millimetres (0.15 in).	

==== Diptera ====
Dipterans of the Konservat-Lagerstätte Menat
Genus	Species	Notes	Image
Bibio	B. sp.	A bibionid known from a specimen lacking an abdomen, the forewing of the fly has been measured to 4.9 millimetres (0.19 in). The exact species could not be determined due to the lack of preserved genitals.	
Paleolomatia	P. menatensis	A bombyliid known from a specimen lacking a head and abdomen with a forewing length of 8.8 millimetres (0.35 in).	
Paleomydas	P. menatensis	A mydid known from a mostly complete specimen, the forewing of the fly has been measured to 15.8 millimetres (0.62 in). Modern members of the family are only found in warmer, though drier regions unlike the fossil genus, with adults that feed on flowers.	
Limnobia	L. theobaldi	A crane fly in the family Limoniidae	

==== Hemiptera ====
Hemipterans of the Konservat-Lagerstätte Menat
Genus	Species	Notes	Image
Aphrophora	A. maculata	A cercopid known from a single specimen with a body length of 5 millimetres (0.20 in).	
Cintux	C. menatensis	A lophopid known from a single specimen with a body length of 8.7 millimetres (0.34 in).	
Cubicostissus	C. palaeocaeni	An issid known from a single forewing that measures 4.04 millimetres (0.159 in).	
Cylindrostethus	C. gaudanti	A gerrid known from multiple specimens from both sexes with an average length of 15.8 millimetres (0.62 in).	
Meuniera	M. haupti	A tettigarctid known from a single specimen made up from the main body and left forewing.	
Mnasthaia	M. arverniorum	A cixiid known from a single specimen with a tegmen length of 10.5 millimetres (0.41 in).	

==== Hymenoptera ====
Hymenopterans of the Konservat-Lagerstätte Menat
Genus	Species	Notes	Image
Cenocimbex	C. menatensis	A cimbicid known from a specimen lacking the antenna and part of the right wings with a body length of 12 millimetres (0.47 in).	
Hervetia	H. paleocenica	A cimbicid known from two specimens, the wasp has a forewing measured to 12 millimetres (0.47 in).	
Manevalia	M. pachyliformis	A hymenopteran known from a hindwing which was attributed to either Argidae or Pterygophoridae.	
Paleohabropoda	P. oudardi	An apid known from a female specimen with wing shapes similar to the modern genus Habropoda. The length of the forewing measures 9.4 millimetres (0.37 in).	
Paleorhopalosoma	P. menatensis	A rhopalosomatid known from a single female specimen with a forewing length of 12.8 millimetres (0.50 in).	
Phaenolobus	P. arvernus	An ichneumonid	
Paleoropronia	P. salamonei	A roproniid known from a single poorly preserved specimen with a forewing length of 7.6 millimetres (0.30 in).	
Palaeovespa	P. menatensis	A vespid known from a poorly preserved specimen with a body length of 21 millimetres (0.83 in). At the time of description, the genus was the earliest vespine found.	
Pristaulacus	P. jarzembowskii	An aulacid known from a mostly complete specimen, being the oldest crown group member of the family at time of publication.	
Probombus	P. hirsutus	A megachilid that was originally described as a relative of bumble bees. It has been suggested that the species may be actually a species of the genus Ctenoplectrella.	
Probombus	P. nelorum	A megachilid known from a single female specimen not as well preserved as the type species. This specimen has an estimated body length of 6.5 millimetres (0.26 in).	
Tithonanthidium	T. menatense	A megachilid potentially part of the tribe Anthidiini known from a single female specimen. The specimen has a body length of 9.13 millimetres (0.359 in)	
Tyrannomecia	T. inopinata	A formicid known from a single specimen represented by a worker with a body length of 4.8 millimetres (0.19 in).	

==== Mantodea ====
Mantises of the Konservat-Lagerstätte Menat
Genus	Species	Notes	Image
Arvernineura	A. insignis	A chaeteessid known from a pair of mostly complete forewings with a length of 30.8 millimetres (1.21 in).	
Louispitonia	L. enigmatica	A chaeteessid known from an incomplete hindwing that was originally identified to be a mayfly.	

==== Odonata ====
Odonates of the Konservat-Lagerstätte Menat
Genus	Species	Notes	Image
Gallosynthemis	G. bechlyi	A synthemistid only known from an incomplete hindwing that measures 10.4 millimetres (0.41 in).	
Macrogomphus	M. menatensis	A small epigomphid known from two forewings and a hindwing attached to a thorax, the forewing of the dragonfly has been measured to be 25.7 millimetres (1.01 in).	
Menatagrion	M. hervetae	A dysagrionid known from a specimen in which only the legs and head are missing; the forewings of the damselfly have bees estimated to be 27.0 millimetres (1.06 in).	
Menatlestes	M. palaeocenicus	A lestinoid placed within a monotypic family known from an almost complete specimen, the fore and hindwings are both about the same length being 28.7 millimetres (1.13 in) long. Based on the presence of an ovipositor similar to what is seen in the family Lestidae, the damselfly most likely injected its eggs into plants.	
Ochrilidia	O. lineata	A caeliferan known by a poorly preserved though mostly specimen that most likely is not able to be referred to the current genus.	
Palaeophylolestes	P. distinctus	A synlestid known from a specimen made up of all of the wings, the thorax, and part of the abdomen. The forewing of the damselfly have been measured to 25.4 millimetres (1.00 in).	
Valerea	V. multicellulata	An amphipterygid known from a wing that has been estimated to measure 36 millimetres (1.4 in).	

==== Orthoptera ====
Orthopterans of the Konservat-Lagerstätte Menat
Genus	Species	Notes	Image
Caelifera genus and sp. indet. A		A caeliferan known from a body with the wings and legs still attached that due to the poor preservation, cannot be assigned to any genus.	
Cenoelcanus	C. menatensis	The only Cenozoic elcanid, being known from an incomplete tegmen.	
Conocephalus	C. martyi	A tettigoniid known from a specimen made up of hindlegs and wings that are attached to the thorax. Though assigned to the genus, it has been noted that it isn't possibly to fully assign it to the genus.	
Grylloidea gen. et sp. indet.		An indeterminate grylloid known from a mostly complete female specimen. Due to features of the female, it has been suggested that the males of the species would have been able to stridulate.	
Menatgryllus	M. longixiphus	A possible gryllid known from a mostly complete female specimen. Due to other members of the family being known by wings, it is unknown how the genus compares to those of a similar age.	
Orthoptera indet.		An orthopteran known from a hind femur originally published under the genus Eremobiites, which was already used at the time and no type species was given.	
Paleochina	P. duvergeri	A chorotypid known from a specimen made up of all wings and the hindlimbs.	
Paleochina	P. minuta	A chorotypid known from isolated tegmina.	
Prophasgonura	P. lineatocollis	A tettigoniid known from a poorly preserved, though mostly complete, female specimen.	

==== Other Insecta ====
Other Insects of the Konservat-Lagerstätte Menat
Genus	Species	Notes	Image
Menatacridium	M. eocenicum	A Polyneoptera known from a mostly complete tegmen that was once classified as an orthopteran.	
Oedipoda	O. sp.	A Polyneoptera known from the front half of the tegmen, it is unknown if the material actually represents the genus or an orthopteran with it originally being assigned to the family Acrididae.	
Orthacanthacris	O. incertus	A possible orthopteran known by a specimen with wings, though it is known which are fore and hind wings. More recent publications suggest that it is most likely either a member of the order Orthoptera or Mantodea.	

== Paleoflora ==
=== Algae ===
Algae of the Konservat-Lagerstätte Menat
Genus	Species	Notes	Image
Botryococcus	B. cf. braunii	A freshwater planktonic algae in the family Botryococcaceae.	
Ovoidites	O. sp.	A freshwater algae found in the shallow, stagnant areas of the lake, the algae being in the family Zygnemataceae.	

=== Angiosperms ===
Angiosperm pollen of the Konservat-Lagerstätte Menat
Genus	Species	Notes	Image
Aquilapollenites	A. sp.	Pollen of unknown affinity with more recent suggestions placing it within Loranthaceae.	
Basopollis	B. obscurocostatus	Pollen of unknown affinity.	
Basopollis	B. urkutensis	Pollen of unknown affinity.	
Brosipollis	B. maximus	Pollen of unknown affinity, possibly assignable to the genus Bursera.	
Caryapollenites	C. imparalis	Pollen assigned to the genus Carya.	
Caryapollenites	C. inelegans	Pollen assigned to the genus Carya.	
Celtipollenites	C. sp.	Pollen assigned to the genus Celtis.	
Cupuliferoipollenites	C. quisqualis	Pollen assigned to the family Fagaceae.	
Ericipites	E. sp.	Pollen associated with the flower Menatanthus mosbruggeri.	
Ilexpollenites	I. coronatus	Pollen assigned to the genus Ilex.	
Interpollis	I. paleocenica	Pollen of unknown affinity.	
Intratriporopollenites	I. menatensis	Pollen assigned to the family Malvaceae.	
Labraferoidaepollenites	L. dilatus	Pollen of unknown affinity.	
Labraferoidaepollenites	cf. L.	Pollen of unknown affinity.	
Minorpollis	M. minimus	Pollen of unknown affinity.	
Momipites	M. nicholsii	Pollen assigned to the family Juglandaceae, possibly the genus Engelhardia.	
Momipites	M. ventifluminis	Pollen assigned to the family Juglandaceae, possibly the genus Engelhardia.	
Momipites	M. wyomingensis	Pollen assigned to the family Juglandaceae, possibly the genus Engelhardia.	
Monoporopollenites	M. sp.	Pollen assigned to the family Arecaceae, the morphology is similar to what is seen in the genus Aiphanes.	
Nudopollis	N. minutus	Pollen of unknown affinity, N. terminalis potentially being assignable to Juglandaceae.	
Nudopollis	N. terminalis	Pollen of unknown affinity, N. terminalis potentially being assignable to Juglandaceae.	
Nyssapollenites	N. sp.	Pollen assigned to the genus Nyssa.	
Paraalnipollenites	P. confusus	Pollen assigned to the genus Myrica.	
Quercopollenites	Q. sp.	Pollen assigned to the genus Quercus.	
Retipollenites	R. confusus	Pollen assigned to the genus Borassodendron.	
Retitrescolpites	R. catenatus	Pollen assigned to the family Hamamelidaceae.	
Rugulitriporites	R. cf. halikaense	Pollen of unknown affinity, potentially being assignable to Juglandaceae.	
Salixipollenites	S. sp.	Pollen assigned to the genus Salix.	
Scabratricolpites	S. menatensis	Pollen assigned to the family Fagaceae.	
Stephanoporopollenites	S. hexaradiatus	Pollen of unknown affinity.	
Subtriporopollenites	S. anulatus	Pollen of unknown affinity, potentially being assignable to Juglandaceae.	
Subtriporopollenites	S. magnoporatus	Pollen of unknown affinity, potentially being assignable to Juglandaceae.	
Subtriporopollenites	S. spissoexinus	Pollen of unknown affinity, potentially being assignable to Juglandaceae.	
Triatriopollenites	T. roboratus	Pollen assigned to the genus Myrica.	
Triporopollenites	T. russellii	Pollen assigned to the family Betulaceae, the morphology being the most similar to Corylus and Palaeocarpinus with the more likely genus being Palaeocarpinus due to the presence of macrofossils.	
Vacuopollis	V. pyramis	Pollen of unknown affinity.	
Vacuopollis	V. venustus	Pollen of unknown affinity.	

Angiosperm macroflora of the Konservat-Lagerstätte Menat
Genus	Species	Notes	Image
Actinodaphne	"A". germari		
Acer	"A". " loetum		
Bignonia	"B". eocenica		
Byttnerophyllum	B. tiliifolium		
Ceanothus	"C". azureus		
Ceratophyllum	"C". cf. submersum		
Cinnamomum	"C". martyi		
Cinnamomum	"C". sp.		
Cocculus	"C". kanii		
Copaifera	"C". cf. laxa		
Corylites	C. macquarrii		
Cornus	"C". sanguinea		
Corylus	"C". macquarrii		
Diospyros	"D". sp.		
Dryandra	D. michelotii		
Dryophyllum	D. curticellense		
Dryophyllum	D. dewalquei		
Dryophyllum	D. laxinerve		
Eotrigonobalanus	E. furcinervis		
Fagus	aff. "F". sp.		
Ficus	"F". reussii		
Fraxinus	"F". agassiziana		
Fraxinus	"F". articulata		
Ilex	"I". cassine		
Iris	"I". cf. pseudocoris		
Laurus	"L". praecellens		
Laurus	"L". subprimigenia		
Lindera	"L". stenoloba		
Lindera	"L". trilobata		
Luheopsis	L. vernieri		
Menatanthus	M. mosbruggeri	A member of Pentapetaleae known from a flower with in situ pollen. Though the exact placement of the plant is unknown, the pollen does resemble that of the modern genus Kalmia.	
Myrica	"M". banksiaefolia		
Myrica	"M". saportana		
Nipadites	"N". burtini		
Palaeocarpinus	P. borealis	Fruit assigned to the family Betulaceae that was originally assigned to the genus Atriplex.	
Platanus	P. schimperi		
Platanus	"P". trisecta		
Podogonium	"P". knorii		
Populus	"P". balsamoides		
Protoficus	"P". crispans		
Prunus	"P". deperdita		
Quercus	"Q". elaena		
Quercus	"Q". lonchitis		
Quercus	"Q". parceserrata		
Rhamnus	"R". inaequalis		
Rhododendron	"R". celasence		
Rhus	R. pyrrhae		
Salix	"S". lamottei		
Sorbus	"S". menatensis		
Tilia	"T". sylvestris		
Viburnum	"V".tilioides		
Zizyphus	"Z". leuschneri		

=== Gymnosperms ===
Gymnosperm pollen of the Konservat-Lagerstätte Menat
Genus	Species	Notes	Image
Taxodiaceaepollenites	T. sp.	Pollen assigned to the family Cupressaceae. The pollen assigned to the family cannot be assigned to a genus, the genera Sequoia and Glyptostrobus are commonly found at the sites.	

Gymnosperm macroflora of the Konservat-Lagerstätte Menat
Genus	Species	Notes	Image
Glyptostrobus	G. europaeus		
Pinus	P. coquandi		
Sequoia	cf. S. langsdorffi		
Taxodium	T. dubium		

=== Polypodiopsida ===
Fern spores of the Konservat-Lagerstätte Menat
Genus	Species	Notes	Image
Laevigatosporites	L. sp.1	Fern spores associated with multiple fern families found in tropical to temperate regions.	
Laevigatosporites	L. sp. 2	Fern spores associated with multiple fern families found in tropical to temperate regions.	
Schizaea	S. sp.	Fern spores attributed to the genus Schizaea, modern species are found in tropical to subtropical regions of the southern peninsula.	

Fern macroflora of the Konservat-Lagerstätte Menat
Genus	Species	Notes	Image
Alsophila	"A". pomeli		
Asplenium	"A". foersteri		
Pteris	P. cf. aquilina		
Pteris	P. lonipennis		
Pteris	P. urophylla		
