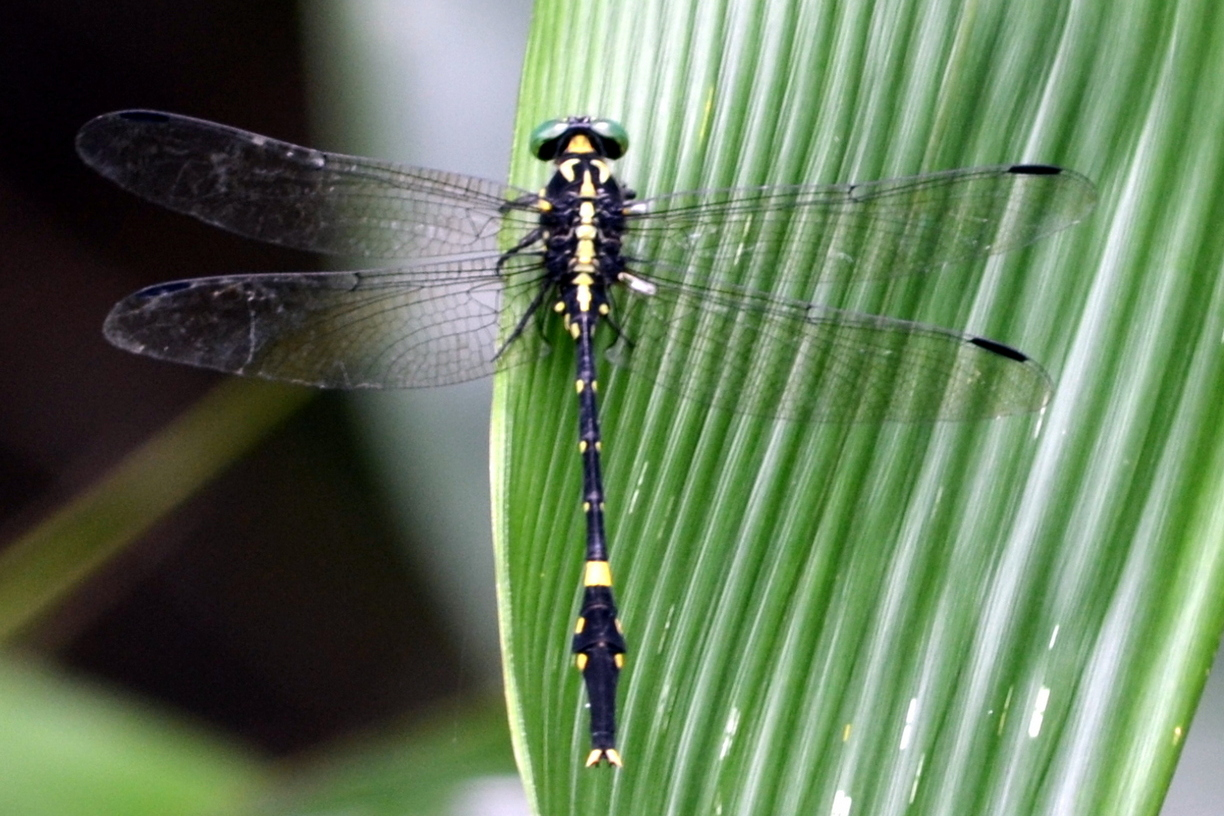
- Male

Conservation status
- Data Deficient (IUCN 3.1)

Scientific classification
- Kingdom: Animalia
- Phylum: Arthropoda
- Class: Insecta
- Order: Odonata
- Infraorder: Anisoptera
- Family: Gomphidae
- Genus: Macrogomphus
- Species: M. wynaadicus

Binomial name
- Macrogomphus wynaadicus Fraser, 1924

= Macrogomphus wynaadicus =

Species of dragonfly

Macrogomphus wynaadicus is a species of dragonfly in the family Gomphidae. It is endemic to the Western Ghats of India.

== Description and habitat ==
It is a medium-sized dragonfly with its thorax black, having two thick yellow ante-humeral stripes. Abdomen is black, marked with citron-yellow paired spots. Segment 2 has a dorsal stripe broken at its centre. Segment 3 has a large base-lateral dorsal spot. Segments 4 to 6 have similar, but smaller spots. Segment 7 has the basal half marked with yellow. Segments 8 and 9 have baso-lateral triangular spots. Segment 8 is very broad, segment 9 is tapering from base to apex, and nearly as long as segments 7 and 8 together as peculiar in genus Macrogomphus.

It looks very similar to Macrogomphus annulatus; but can be distinguished by the paired spots on abdominal segments 3 to 6 instead of complete rings.

The species is found in forested streams where it breeds.

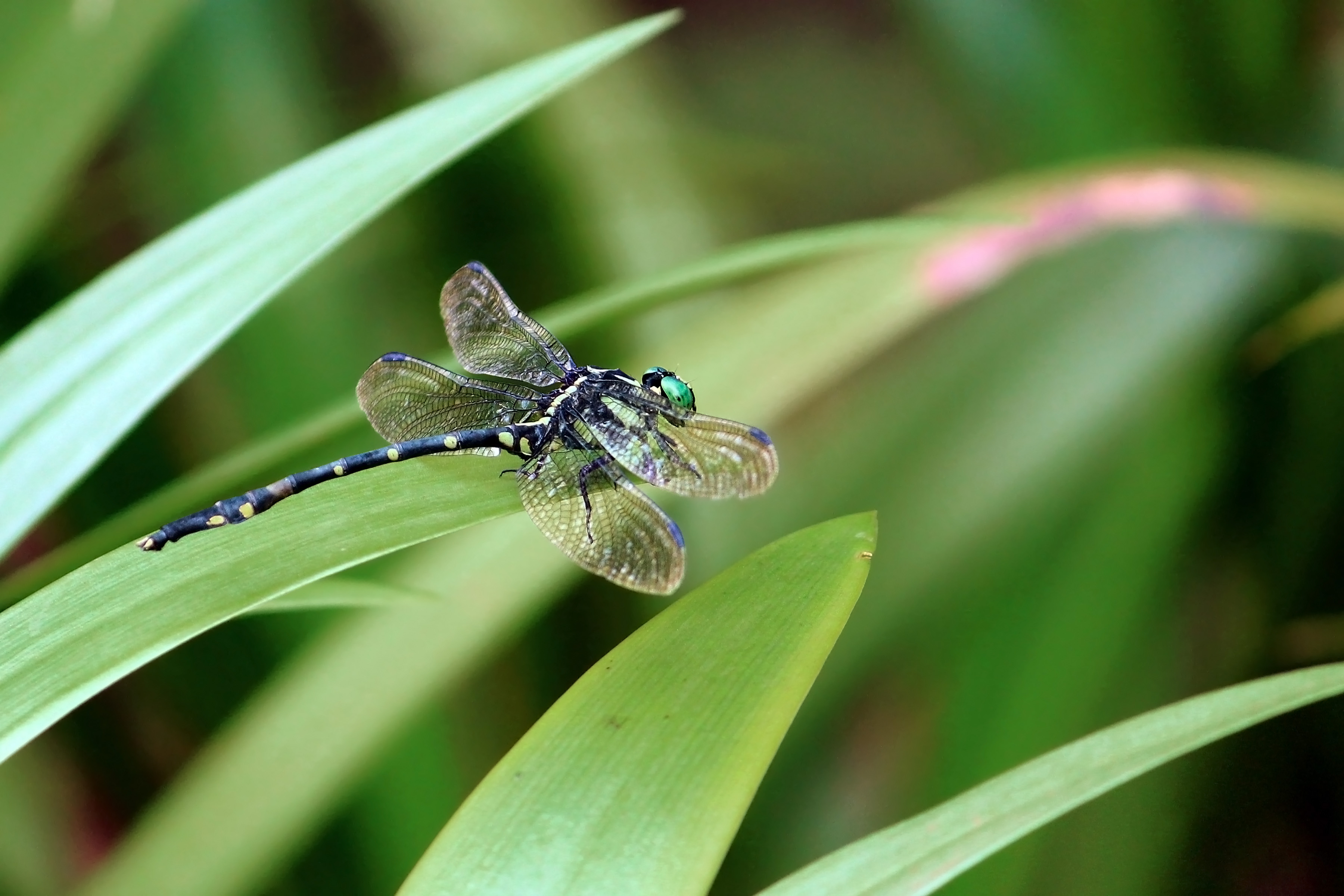
male

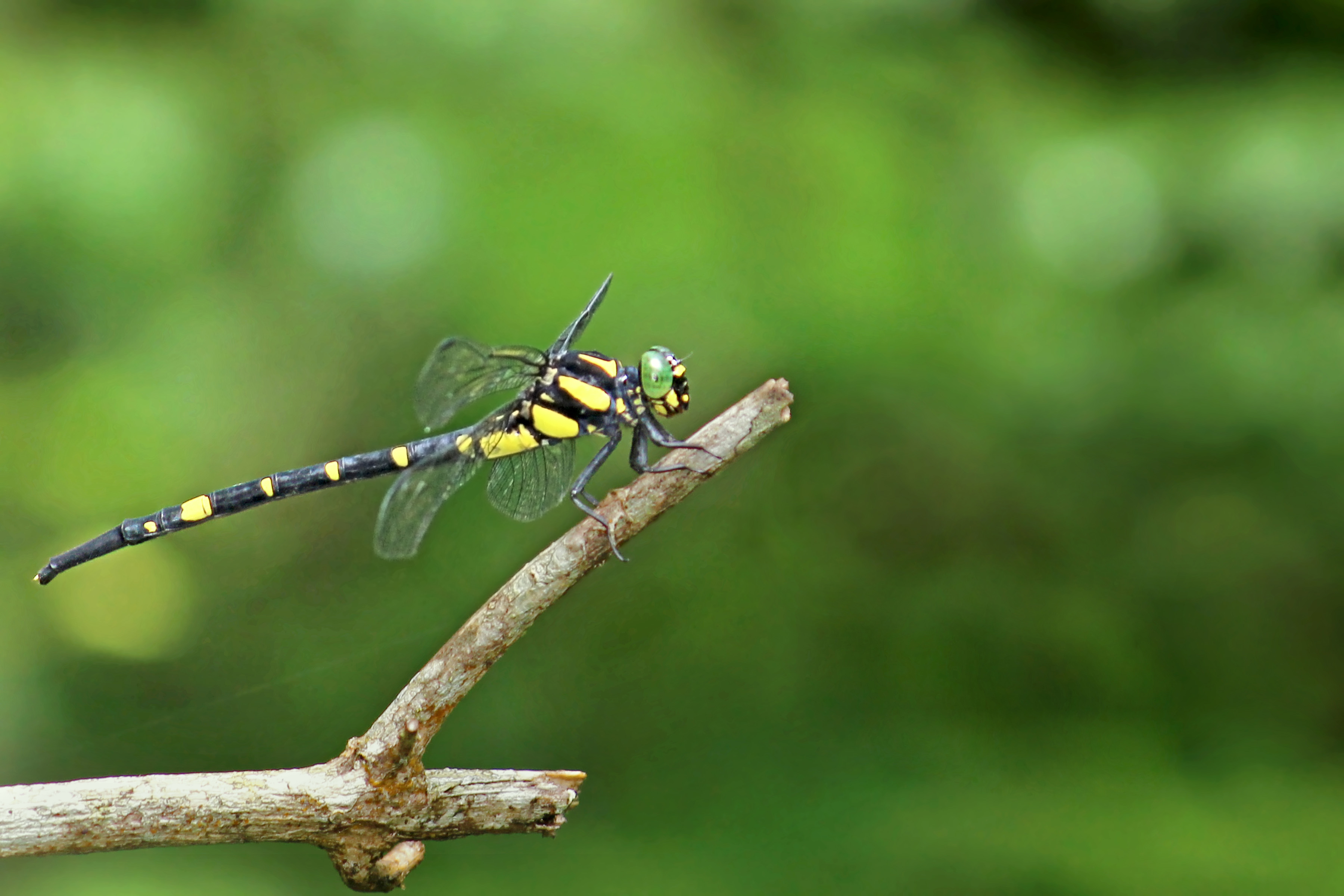
female

== See also ==
- List of odonates of India
- List of odonata of Kerala
