= Chaeteessa filata =

Scientific classification
- Kingdom: Animalia
- Phylum: Arthropoda
- Clade: Pancrustacea
- Class: Insecta
- Order: Mantodea
- Family: Chaeteessidae
- Genus: Chaeteessa
- Species: C. filata

Binomial name
- Chaeteessa filata Burmeister, 1838

Species of praying mantis

Chaeteessa filata is a species of praying mantis in the family Chaeteessidae.
