= Chaeteessa burmeisteri =

Scientific classification
- Kingdom: Animalia
- Phylum: Arthropoda
- Clade: Pancrustacea
- Class: Insecta
- Order: Mantodea
- Family: Chaeteessidae
- Genus: Chaeteessa
- Species: C. burmeisteri

Binomial name
- Chaeteessa burmeisteri Giebel, 1862

Species of praying mantis

Chaeteessa burmeisteri is a species of praying mantis in the family Chaeteessidae.
