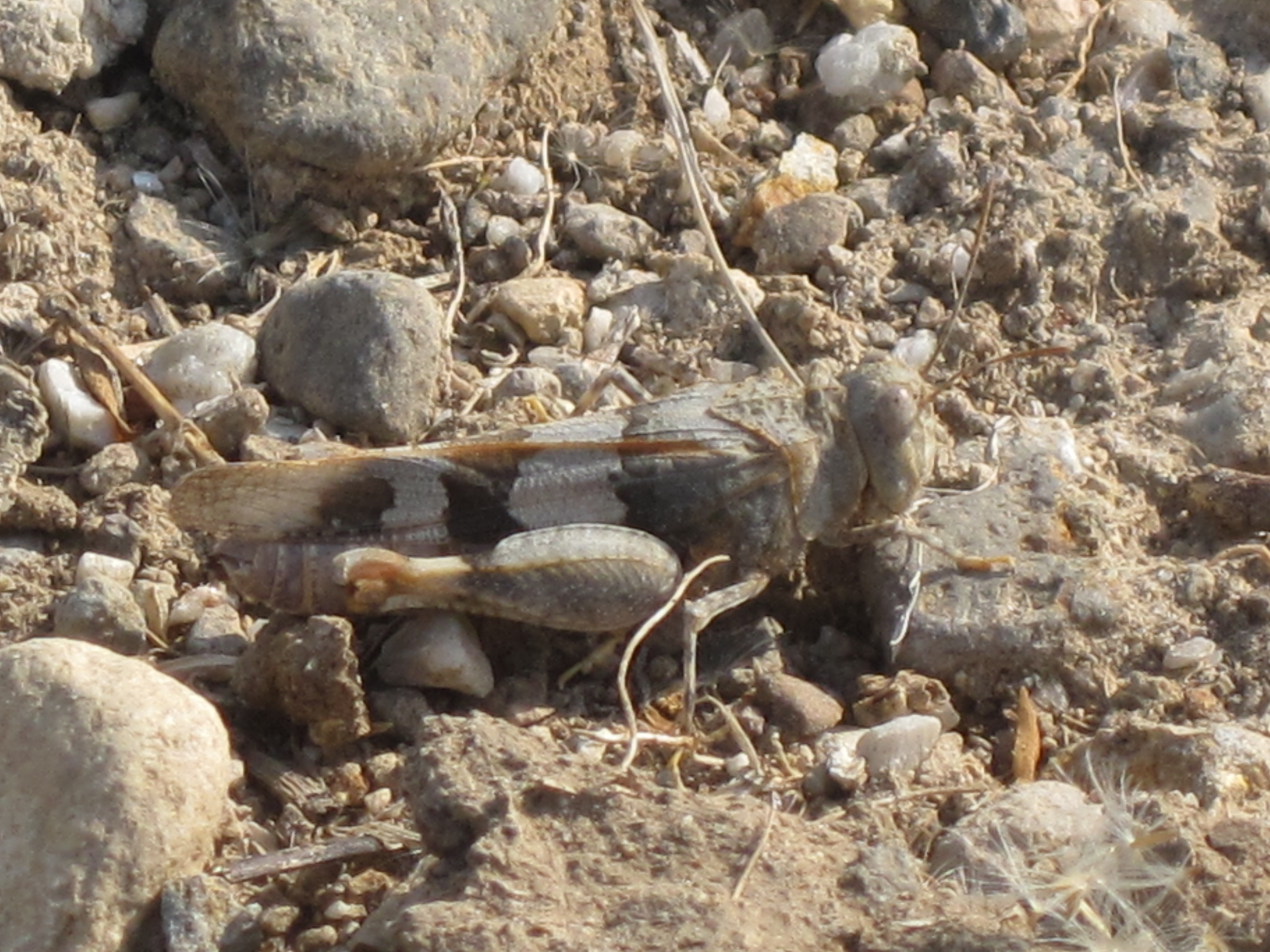
- Oedipoda miniata in Lesbos, Greece

Scientific classification
- Kingdom: Animalia
- Phylum: Arthropoda
- Clade: Pancrustacea
- Class: Insecta
- Order: Orthoptera
- Suborder: Caelifera
- Family: Acrididae
- Subfamily: Oedipodinae
- Tribe: Oedipodini
- Genus: Oedipoda
- Species: O. miniata

Binomial name
- Oedipoda miniata (Pallas, 1771)

Synonyms
- Gryllus miniatus Pallas, 1771 For O. m. miniata: Oedipoda gratiosa Serville, 1838; Oedipoda perurbana Steinmann, 1965; Oedipoda miniata salina Jacobson, 1905

= Oedipoda miniata =

Species of grasshopper

Oedipoda miniata, sometimes known as the red-winged grasshopper (although the name is also used for O. germanica), is a grasshopper species in the subfamily Oedipodinae found in Southern Europe, northern Africa and the Middle-East.

It was originally described in 1771 as Gryllus miniatus. It is in the Oedipoda caerulescens species group.

== Subspecies ==
Orthoptera Species File and the Catalogue of Life list three subspecies:

- Oedipoda miniata miniata (Pallas, 1771)
- Oedipoda miniata atripes Bei-Bienko, 1951
- Oedipoda miniata mauritanica Lucas, H., 1849
