= Chaeteessa nana =

Scientific classification
- Kingdom: Animalia
- Phylum: Arthropoda
- Clade: Pancrustacea
- Class: Insecta
- Order: Mantodea
- Family: Chaeteessidae
- Genus: Chaeteessa
- Species: C. nana

Binomial name
- Chaeteessa nana Jantsch, 1995

Species of praying mantis

Chaeteessa nana is a species of praying mantis in the Chaeteessidae family.
