= Chaeteessa valida =

Scientific classification
- Kingdom: Animalia
- Phylum: Arthropoda
- Clade: Pancrustacea
- Class: Insecta
- Order: Mantodea
- Family: Chaeteessidae
- Genus: Chaeteessa
- Species: C. valida

Binomial name
- Chaeteessa valida Perty, 1833

Species of praying mantis

Chaeteessa valida is a species of praying mantis in the family Chaeteessidae.
