= Menatalligator =

Menatalligator Temporal range: Early Eocene: Ypresian, ~56.0–47.8 Ma

Scientific classification
- Domain: Eukaryota
- Kingdom: Animalia
- Phylum: Chordata
- Class: Reptilia
- Clade: Archosauromorpha
- Clade: Archosauriformes
- Order: Crocodilia
- Family: Alligatoridae
- Genus: †Menatalligator; Piton, 1937

Type species
- †Menatalligator bergouniouxi Piton, 1937

Extinct genus of reptiles

Menatalligator is an extinct monospecific genus of alligatorid crocodilian. Fossils have been found that are Eocene in age from a locality in the commune of Menat in the Puy-de-Dôme department of France. The type and only species, named in 1937, is M. bergouniouxi.

The strata from which remains of Menatalligator have been found are part of the Chaîne des Puys, a volcanically active chain of mountains in the Massif Central. The deposit is thought to have formed through the deposition of sediments in a body of water that filled a volcanic crater during the early Eocene (Ypresian). Fossil fish such as Amia valenciennense and Thaumaturus have been found from the same strata as Menatalligator, and most likely comprised a portion of its diet. The presence of the early primate-like plesiadapiform Plesiadapis insignis from these strata also make the area important to the study of early mammalian evolution after the Cretaceous–Paleogene boundary (K–T boundary).
