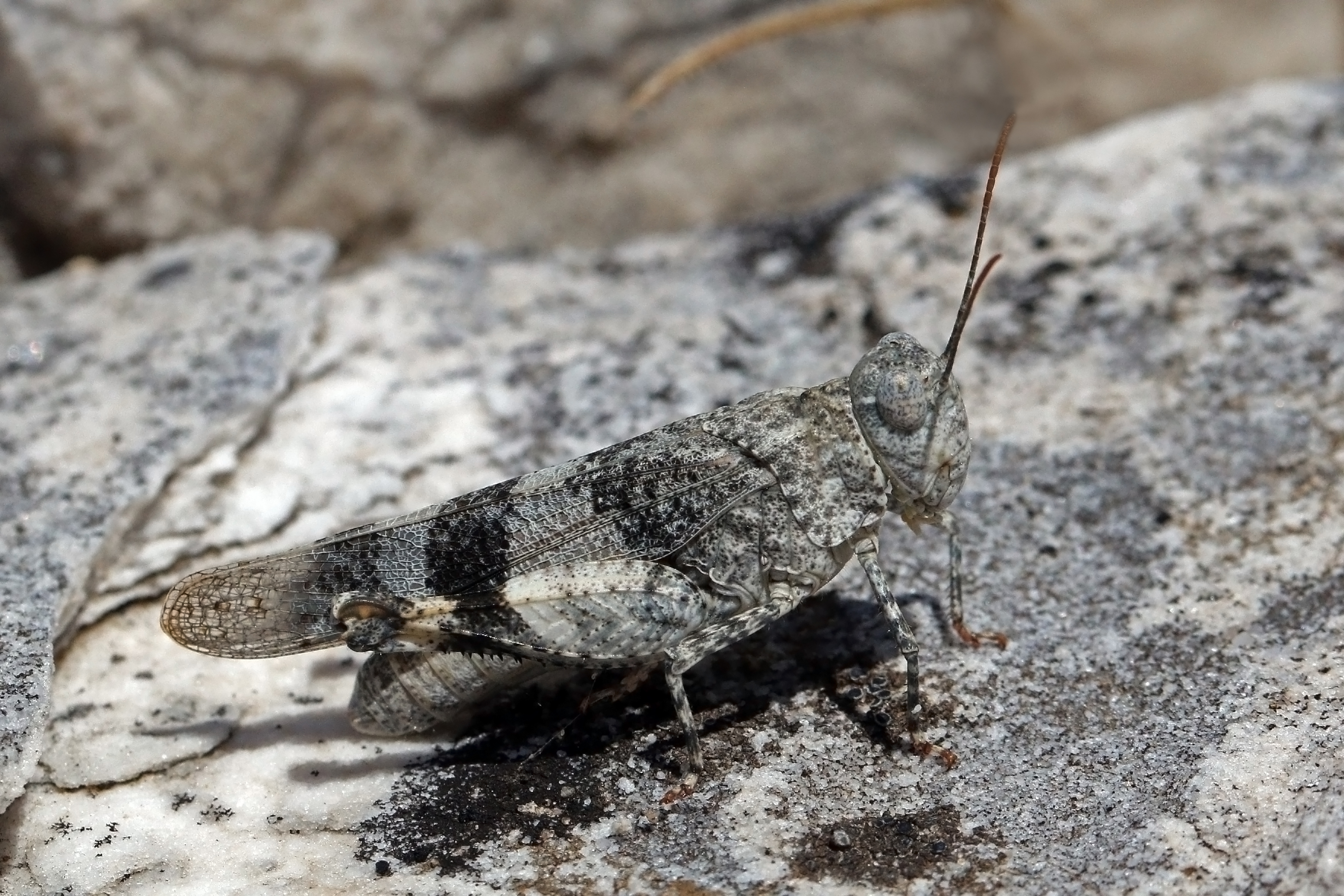
- male
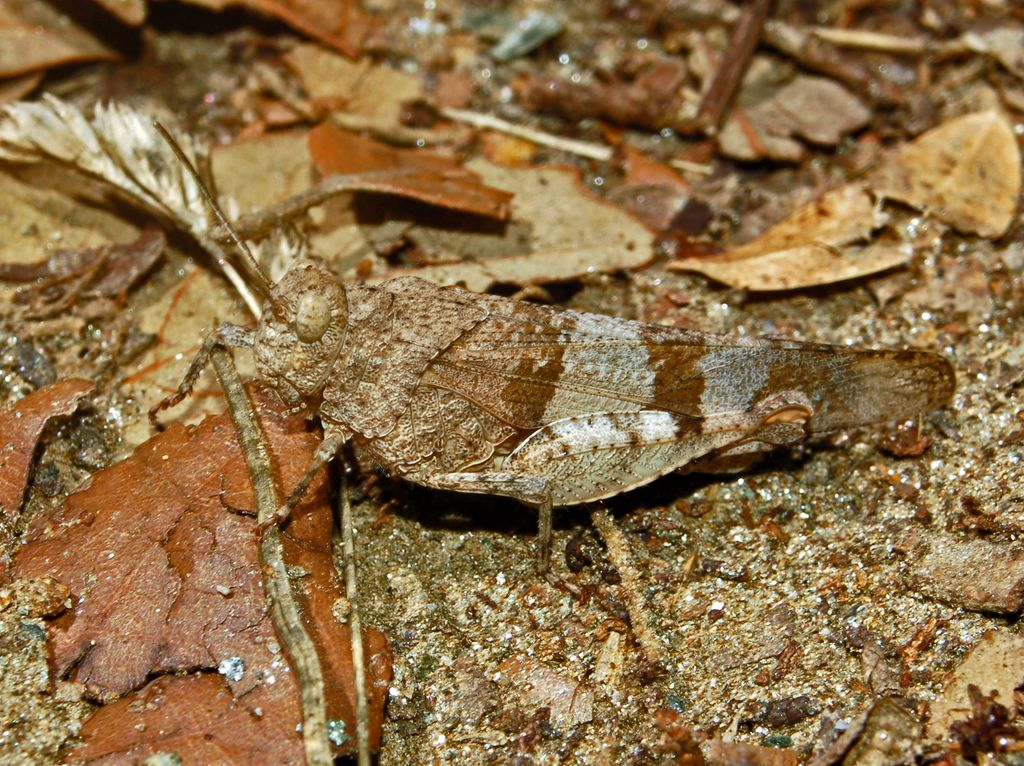
- female

Scientific classification
- Kingdom: Animalia
- Phylum: Arthropoda
- Clade: Pancrustacea
- Class: Insecta
- Order: Orthoptera
- Suborder: Caelifera
- Family: Acrididae
- Subfamily: Oedipodinae
- Tribe: Oedipodini
- Genus: Oedipoda
- Species: O. germanica

Binomial name
- Oedipoda germanica (Latreille, 1804)

= Oedipoda germanica =

Species of grasshopper

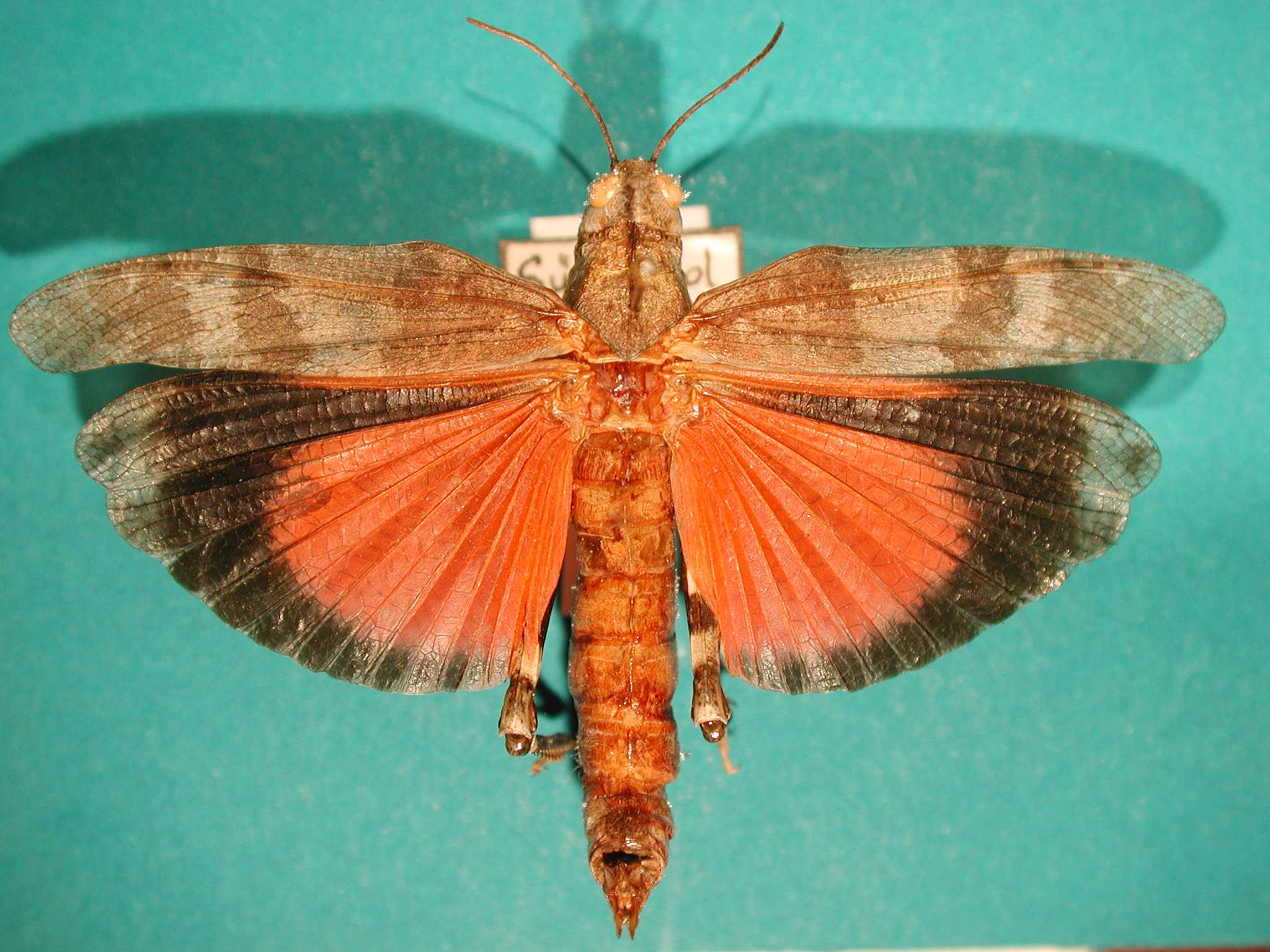
''Oedipoda germanica, from Zoologischen Staatssammlung München

Oedipoda germanica, sometimes known as the "red-winged grasshopper" (although the name also may be used for O. miniata), is a species of short-horned grasshoppers belonging to the family Acrididae subfamily Oedipodinae.

This grasshopper is present in Austria, Belgium, Greece, France, Germany, Italy, Spain, Switzerland, Czech Republic, and in the Near East.

The adult males grow up to 15–22 millimetres (0.59–0.87 in) long, while the females reach 22–32 millimetres (0.87–1.26 in)of length. They can be encountered from early June through October in warm and dry stony or rocky habitats. They are almost exclusively phytophagous, mainly feeding in grass of mountain pastures and various herbaceous plants (Asperula cynanchica, Galeopsis angustifolia, Hippocrepis comosa, Teucrium chamaedrys, etc.).

The body is quite large and rounded. The basic coloration is brown-grayish, with transversal darker areas. The pronotum is equipped with a median carina of pronotum not much raised. The compound eyes are large. The delicate front wings are straight and narrow, their colour is beige with darker bands. The hind wings are red (while they are turquoise in Oedipoda caerulescens) with a black band on margin and are fit for flight.

The eggs - laid in clusters below the surface of the soil - hatch in next Spring.

Femora of the hind legs are red on the bottom, while tibiae are yellowish in the females and black in males.

Close-Up of a Oedipoda germanica

== Subspecies ==
- Oedipoda germanica var. germanica (Latreille, 1804)
- Oedipoda germanica var. kraussi Ramme, 1913
- Oedipoda germanica var. meridionalis Ramme, 1913
- Oedipoda germanica var. aurea Uvarov, 1923 - Oedipoda germanica var. aurea Uvarov, 1923
