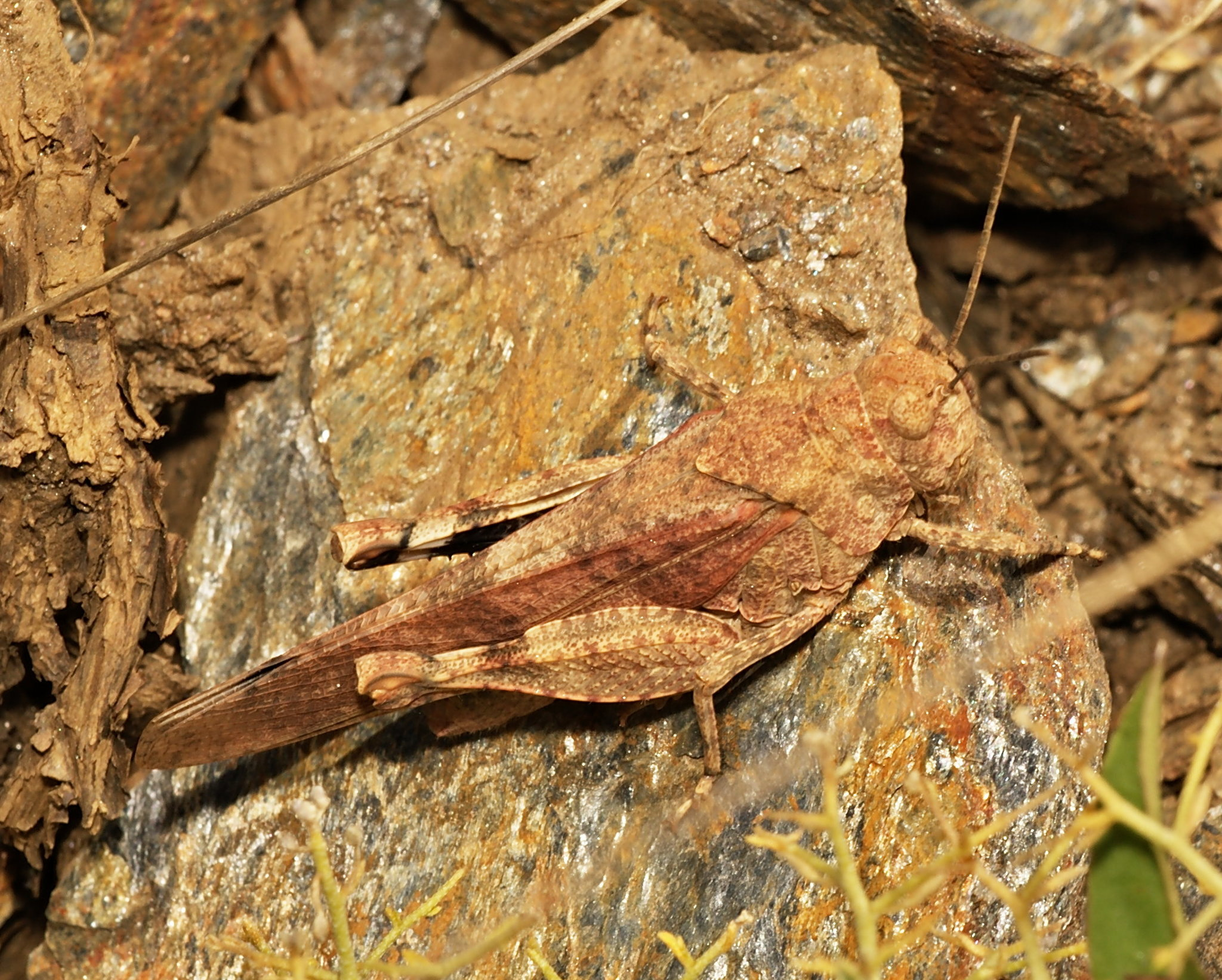
- In Spain

Conservation status
- Least Concern (IUCN 3.1)

Scientific classification
- Kingdom: Animalia
- Phylum: Arthropoda
- Clade: Pancrustacea
- Class: Insecta
- Order: Orthoptera
- Suborder: Caelifera
- Family: Acrididae
- Subfamily: Oedipodinae
- Tribe: Oedipodini
- Genus: Oedipoda
- Species: O. coerulea

Binomial name
- Oedipoda coerulea Saussure, 1884

= Oedipoda coerulea =

Iberian band-winged grasshopper

Species of band-winged grasshopper

Oedipoda coerulea, the Iberian band-winged grasshopper, is a species of band-winged grasshopper in the family Acrididae. It is found in Europe.

The IUCN conservation status of Oedipoda coerulea is "LC", least concern, with no immediate threat to the species' survival. The IUCN status was assessed in 2015.
