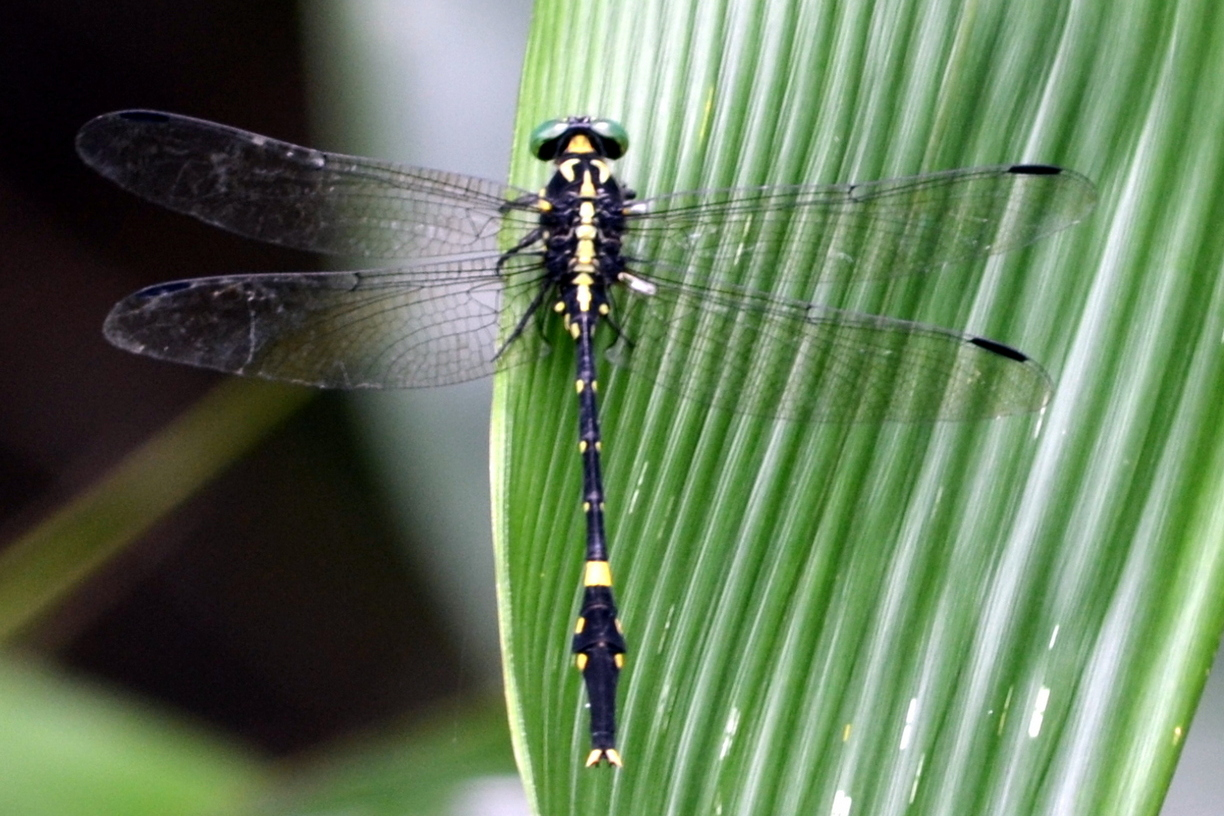
- Macrogomphus wynaadicus

Scientific classification
- Kingdom: Animalia
- Phylum: Arthropoda
- Class: Insecta
- Order: Odonata
- Infraorder: Anisoptera
- Family: Gomphidae
- Genus: Macrogomphus; Selys, 1858

= Macrogomphus =

Macrogomphus Temporal range: Late Paleocene–present

Genus of dragonflies

Macrogomphus is a genus of dragonfly in the family Gomphidae. It contains the following species:

- Macrogomphus abnormis Selys, 1884
- Macrogomphus annulatus (Selys, 1854)
- Macrogomphus borikhanensis Fraser, 1933
- Macrogomphus decemlineatus Selys, 1878
- Macrogomphus guilinensis Chao, 1982
- Macrogomphus keiseri Lieftinck, 1955
- Macrogomphus kerri Fraser, 1932
- Macrogomphus lankanensis Fraser, 1933
- Macrogomphus matsukii Asahina, 1986
- †Macrogomphus menatensis Nel & Jouhalt, 2022 (fossil; Late Paleocene of France, Menat Formation)
- Macrogomphus montanus Selys, 1869
- Macrogomphus parallelogramma (Burmeister, 1839)
- Macrogomphus phalantus Lieftinck, 1935
- Macrogomphus quadratus Selys, 1878
- Macrogomphus rivularis Förster, 1914
- Macrogomphus robustus (Selys, 1878)
- Macrogomphus seductus Fraser, 1926
- Macrogomphus thoracicus McLachlan, 1884
- Macrogomphus wynaadicus Fraser, 1924
