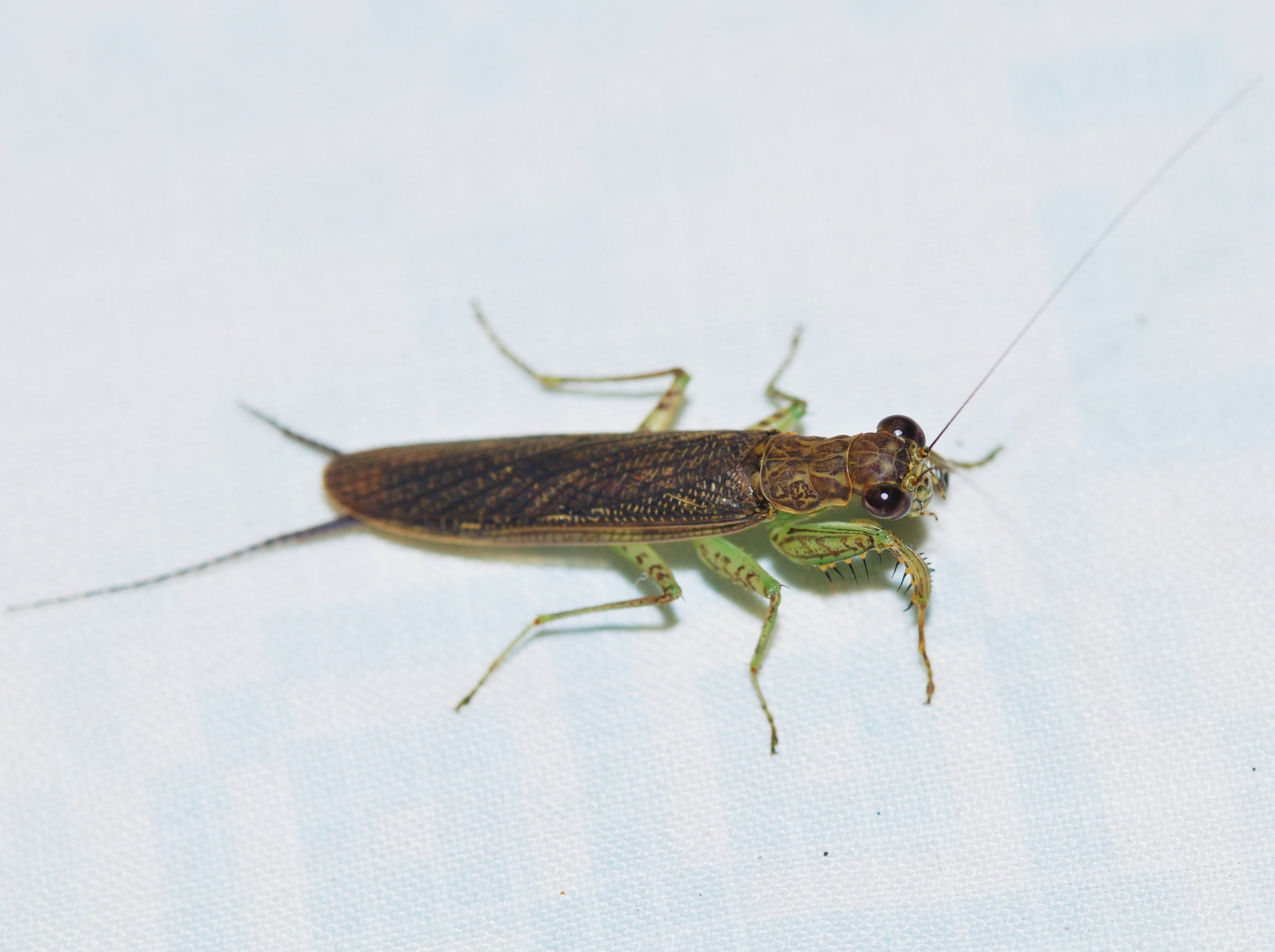

Scientific classification
- Kingdom: Animalia
- Phylum: Arthropoda
- Clade: Pancrustacea
- Class: Insecta
- Order: Mantodea
- Family: Chaeteessidae
- Genus: Chaeteessa; Burmeister, 1838

Synonyms
- Chaetessa Saussure, 1869; Hoplophora Perty, 1833

= Chaeteessa =

Genus of praying mantises

Chaeteessa is a genus of mantis. It is the only extant member of the family Chaeteessidae, the most primitive lineage of living mantises. It contains six species found in South America:

== Species ==
- Chaeteessa burmeisteri
- Chaeteessa caudata
- Chaeteessa filata
- Chaeteessa nana
- Chaeteessa nigromarginata
- Chaeteessa valida
