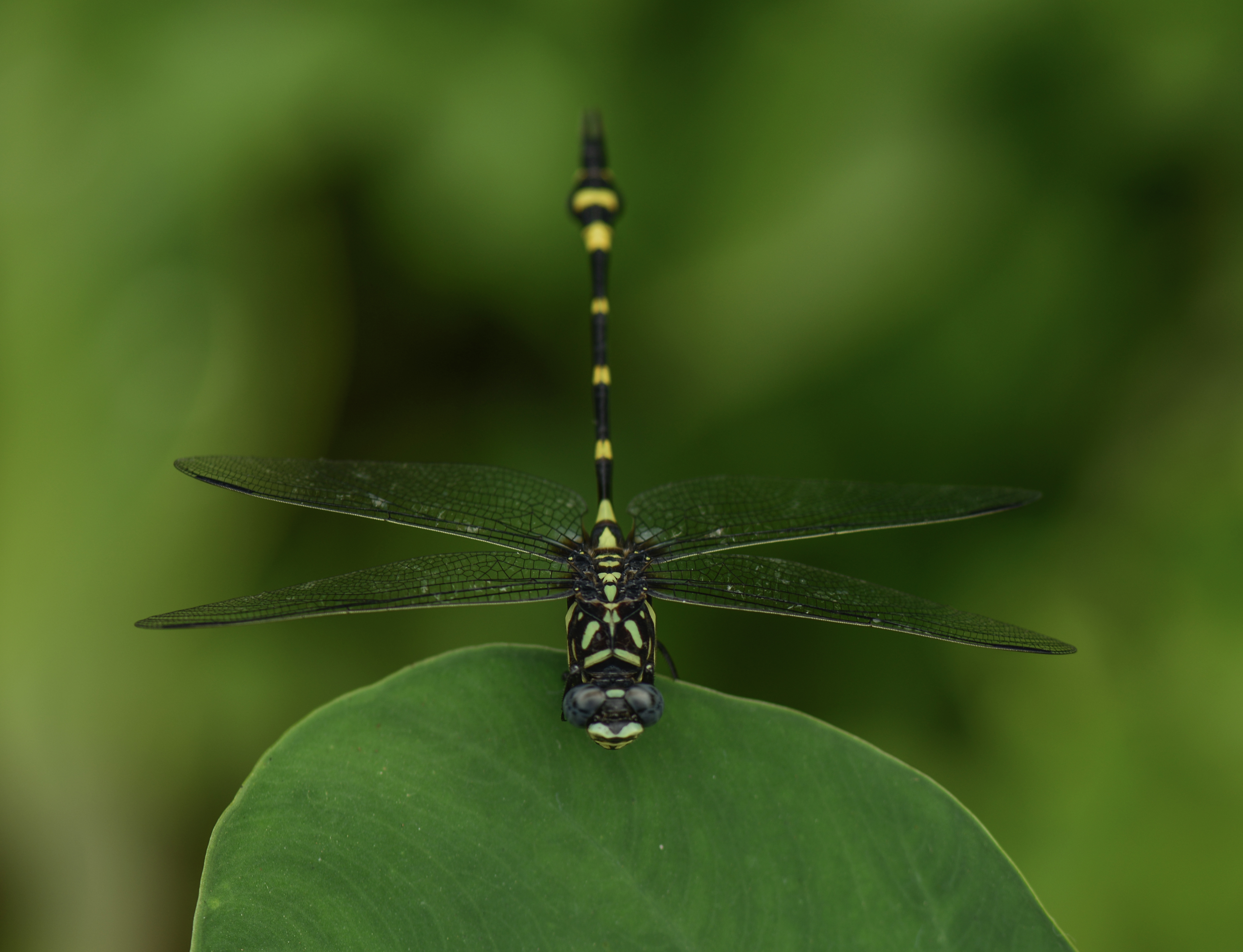

Conservation status
- Near Threatened (IUCN 3.1)

Scientific classification
- Kingdom: Animalia
- Phylum: Arthropoda
- Class: Insecta
- Order: Odonata
- Infraorder: Anisoptera
- Family: Gomphidae
- Genus: Macrogomphus
- Species: M. lankanensis

Binomial name
- Macrogomphus lankanensis Fraser, 1933

= Macrogomphus lankanensis =

Species of dragonfly

Macrogomphus lankanensis is a species of dragonfly in the family Gomphidae. It is endemic to Sri Lanka. Its natural habitats are rivers and irrigated land. It is threatened by habitat loss.
