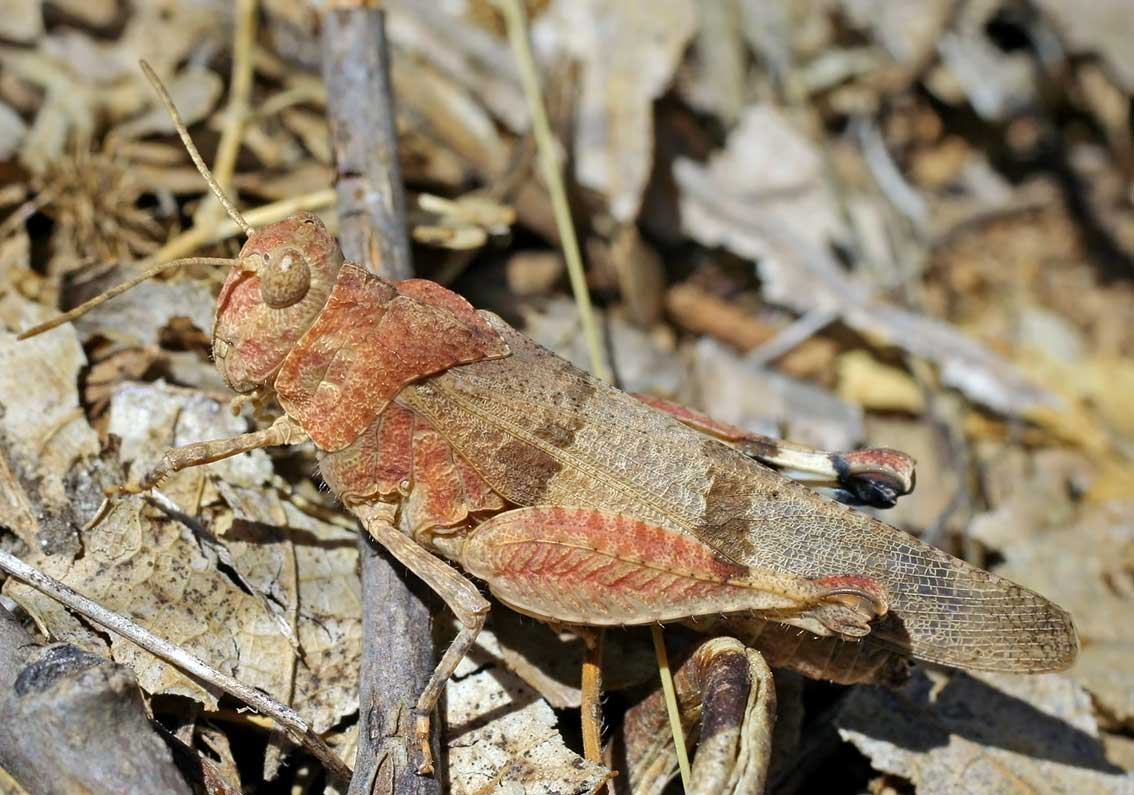
- Oedipoda charpentieri

Conservation status
- Least Concern (IUCN 3.1)

Scientific classification
- Kingdom: Animalia
- Phylum: Arthropoda
- Clade: Pancrustacea
- Class: Insecta
- Order: Orthoptera
- Suborder: Caelifera
- Family: Acrididae
- Subfamily: Oedipodinae
- Tribe: Oedipodini
- Genus: Oedipoda
- Species: O. charpentieri

Binomial name
- Oedipoda charpentieri Fieber, 1853

= Oedipoda charpentieri =

Species of grasshopper

Oedipoda charpentieri is a species of band-winged grasshopper in the family Acrididae. It is found in southern Europe.

The IUCN conservation status of Oedipoda charpentieri is "LC", least concern, with no immediate threat to the species' survival. The IUCN status was assessed in 2014.
