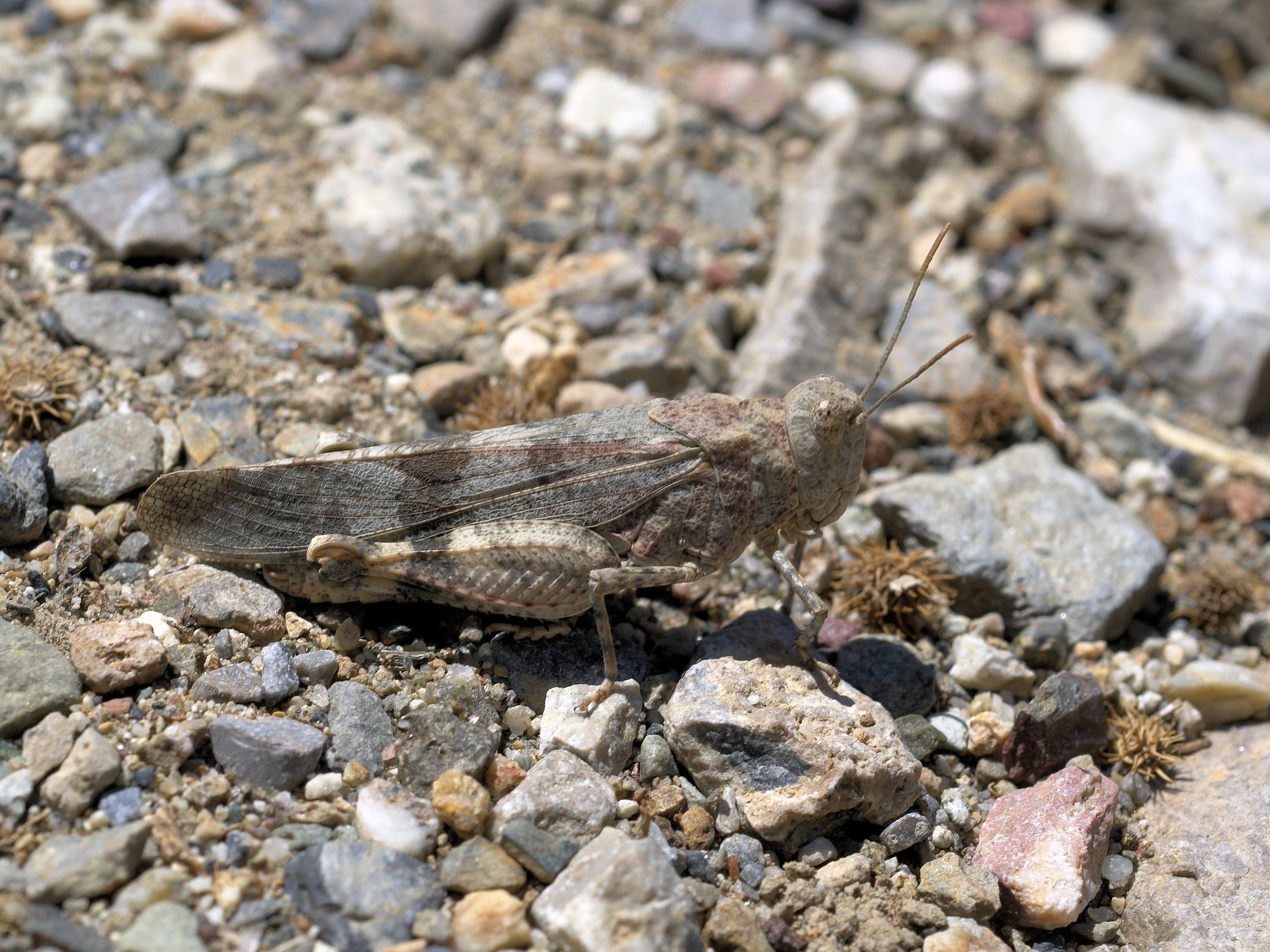
- Oedipoda caerulescens

Scientific classification
- Kingdom: Animalia
- Phylum: Arthropoda
- Clade: Pancrustacea
- Class: Insecta
- Order: Orthoptera
- Suborder: Caelifera
- Family: Acrididae
- Subfamily: Oedipodinae
- Tribe: Oedipodini
- Genus: Oedipoda; Latreille, 1829

Synonyms
- Aedipoda Le Guillou, 1841; Ctyphippus Bolívar, 1876; Ctypohippus Fieber, 1852; Eusternum Wesmaël, 1838

= Oedipoda =

Genus of grasshoppers

Oedipoda is the type genus of grasshoppers in the subfamily Oedipodinae, mostly from the Palaearctic realm. The type species is the European "blue-winged grasshopper", Oedipoda caerulescens.

== Species ==
The Orthoptera Species File lists:

species group caerulescens (Linnaeus, 1758)

1. Oedipoda caerulescens (Linnaeus, 1758)
2. Oedipoda canariensis Krauss, 1892
3. Oedipoda charpentieri Fieber, 1853
4. Oedipoda miniata (Pallas, 1771)
5. Oedipoda schochii Brunner von Wattenwyl, 1884

species group germanica (Latreille, 1804)

1. Oedipoda aurea Uvarov, 1923
2. Oedipoda coerulea Saussure, 1884
3. Oedipoda fuscocincta Lucas, 1847
4. Oedipoda germanica (Latreille, 1804)
5. Oedipoda venusta Fieber, 1853

species group not determined

1. Oedipoda cynthiae Fontana, Buzzetti & Massa, 2019
2. Oedipoda discessa Steinmann, 1965
3. Oedipoda fedtschenki Saussure, 1884 (2 subspecies)
4. Oedipoda himalayana Uvarov, 1925
5. Oedipoda infumata Bey-Bienko, 1949
6. Oedipoda jaxartensis Uvarov, 1912
7. Oedipoda kurda Descamps, 1967
8. Oedipoda ledereri Saussure, 1888
9. Oedipoda liturata Le Guillou, 1841- southwestern Pacific
10. Oedipoda maculata Le Guillou, 1841 - Sulawesi
11. Oedipoda muchei Harz, 1978
12. Oedipoda neelumensis Mahmood & Yousuf, 1999
13. Oedipoda pernix Steinmann, 1965
14. Oedipoda tincta Walker, 1870
15. Oedipoda turkestanica Steinmann, 1965

† extinct species

1. †Oedipoda germari Heer, 1865
2. †Oedipoda haidingeri Heer, 1865
3. †Oedipoda longipennis Poncrácz, 1928
4. †Oedipoda nigrofasciolata Heer, 1849
5. †Oedipoda oeningensis Heer, 1849
6. †Oedipoda pulchra Poncrácz, 1928
