= Properca =

Properca Temporal range: Middle Paleocene to Miocene

Scientific classification
- Kingdom: Animalia
- Phylum: Chordata
- Class: Actinopterygii
- Clade: Percomorpha
- Genus: †Properca; Sauvage, 1880

Species
- P. angusta (Agassiz, 1836); P. prisca (Agassiz, 1834)

Synonyms
- Bilinia Obrhelová, 1971

Extinct genus of ray-finned fishes

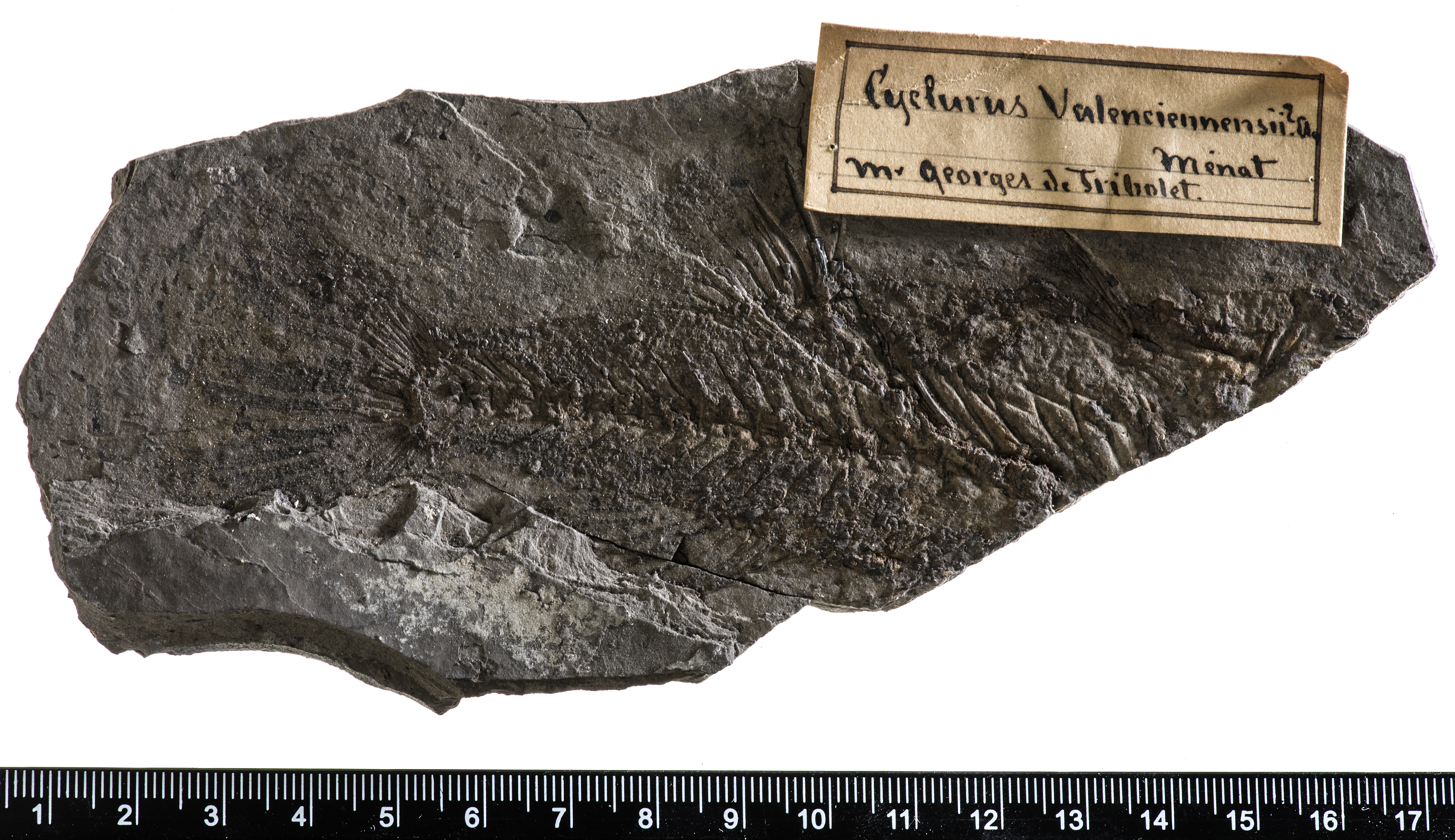
Properca angusta fossil

Properca is an extinct genus of marine percomorph ray-finned fish that lived in Europe throughout much of the Cenozoic, from the Paleocene to the Miocene epochs.

It is often placed with the southern perches (family Percichthyidae), which are now present only in the Southern Hemisphere; however, this is based on an outdated treatment of the taxon. Other recent studies have placed it in the Percidae.

The following species are known:

- P. angusta (Agassiz, 1836) - Middle-Late Paleocene of France, mid-Miocene of Bulgaria
- P. prisca (Agassiz, 1834) - Late Eocene of the Czech Republic (syn: Bilinia uraschista Obrhelová, 1971)

The species Properca sabbai has been reclassified into the genus Repropca in the extinct family Repropcidae. Further revision of the genus is likely necessary.
