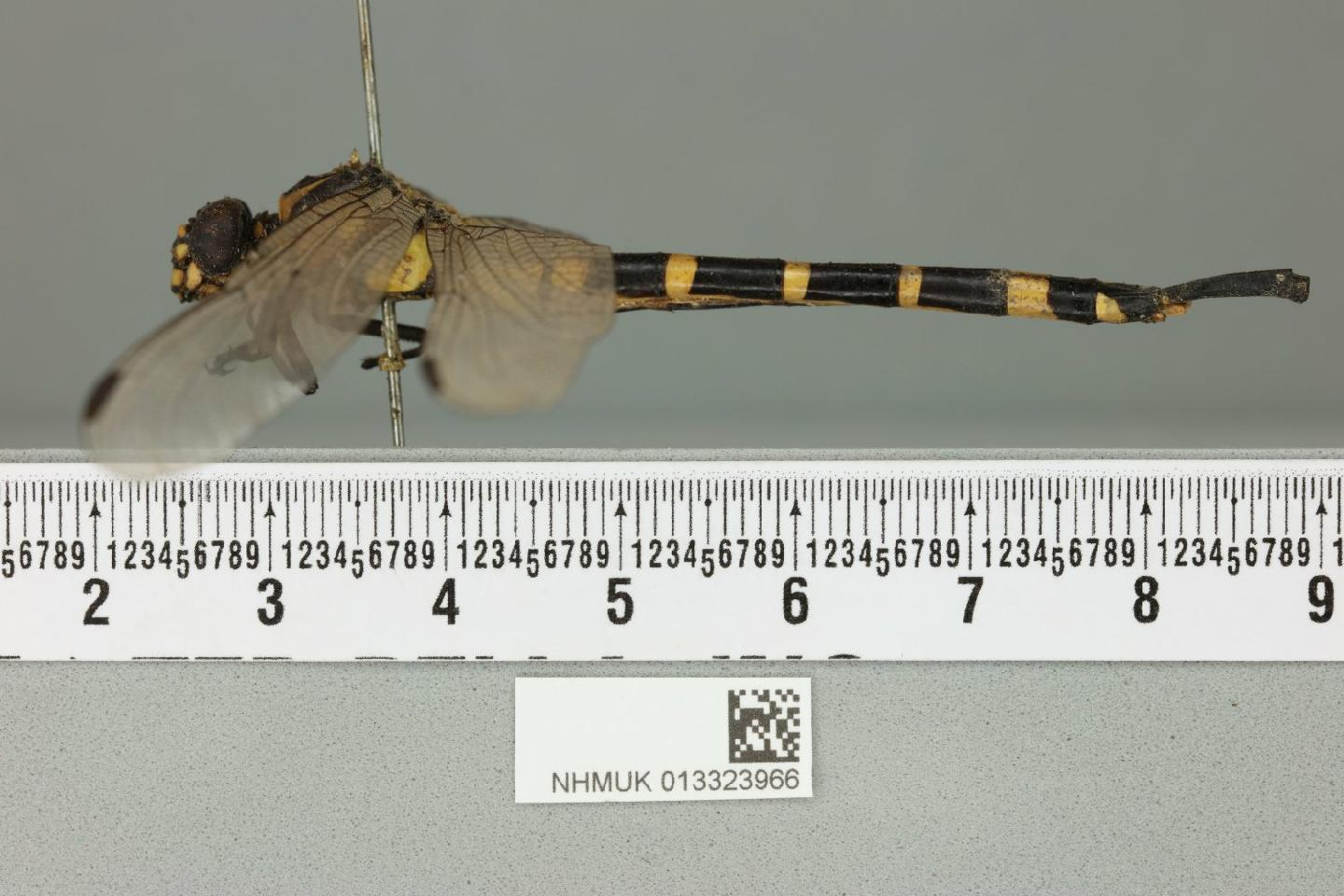

Conservation status
- Data Deficient (IUCN 3.1)

Scientific classification
- Domain: Eukaryota
- Kingdom: Animalia
- Phylum: Arthropoda
- Class: Insecta
- Order: Odonata
- Infraorder: Anisoptera
- Family: Gomphidae
- Genus: Macrogomphus
- Species: M. annulatus

Binomial name
- Macrogomphus annulatus (Sélys, 1854)

= Macrogomphus annulatus =

Keiser's forktail

Species of dragonfly

Macrogomphus annulatus, commonly known as Keiser's forktail, is a species of dragonfly in the family Gomphidae. It is native to India and Sri Lanka. Two subspecies are recognized, which are geographically separated.

== Subspecies ==
- Macrogomphus annulatus annulatus Selys, 1854 – from India
- Macrogomphus annulatus keiseri Lieftinck, 1955 – from Sri Lanka

== See also ==
- List of odonates of Sri Lanka
- List of odonates of India
