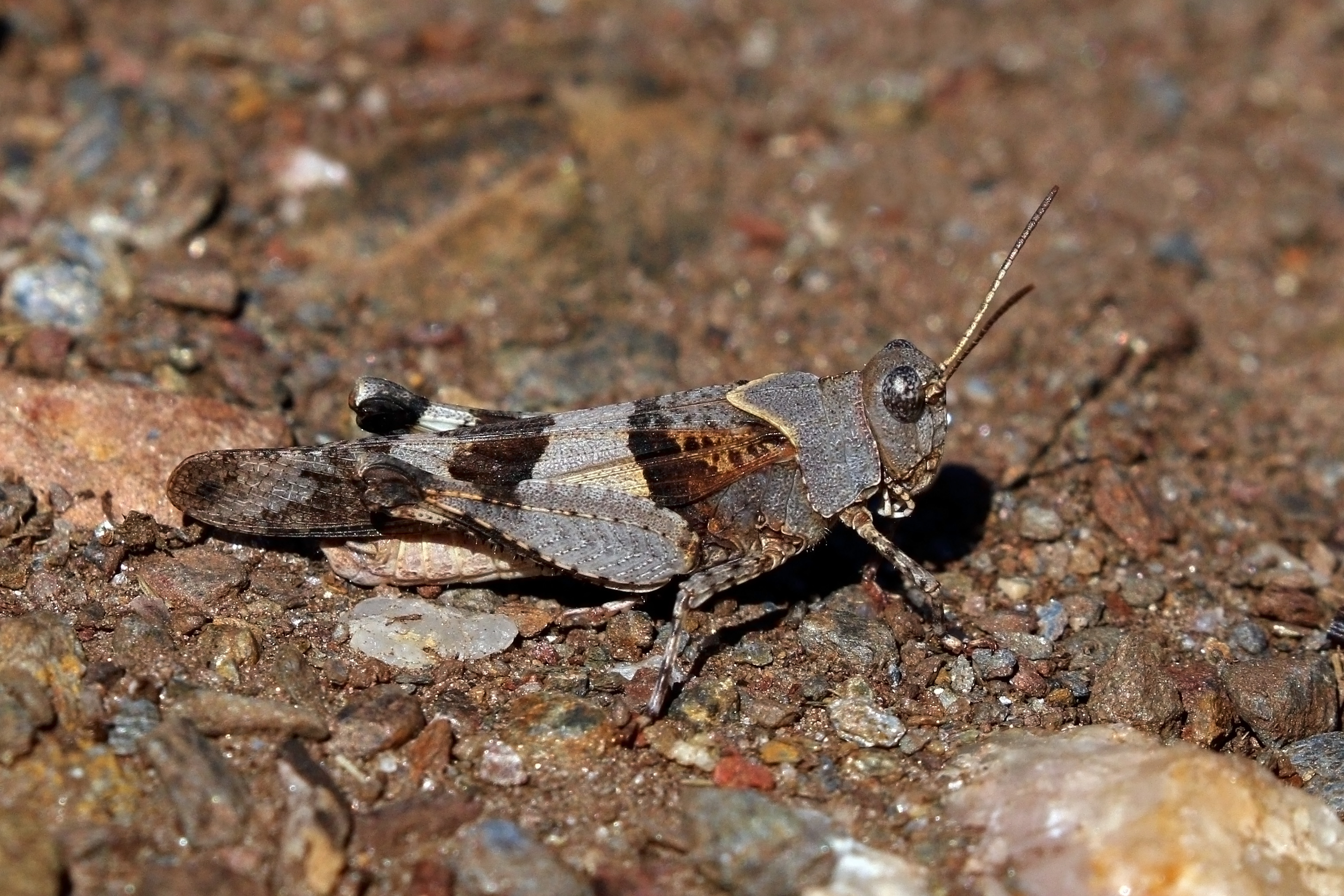
- Male; Nature Park of Alvão, Portugal
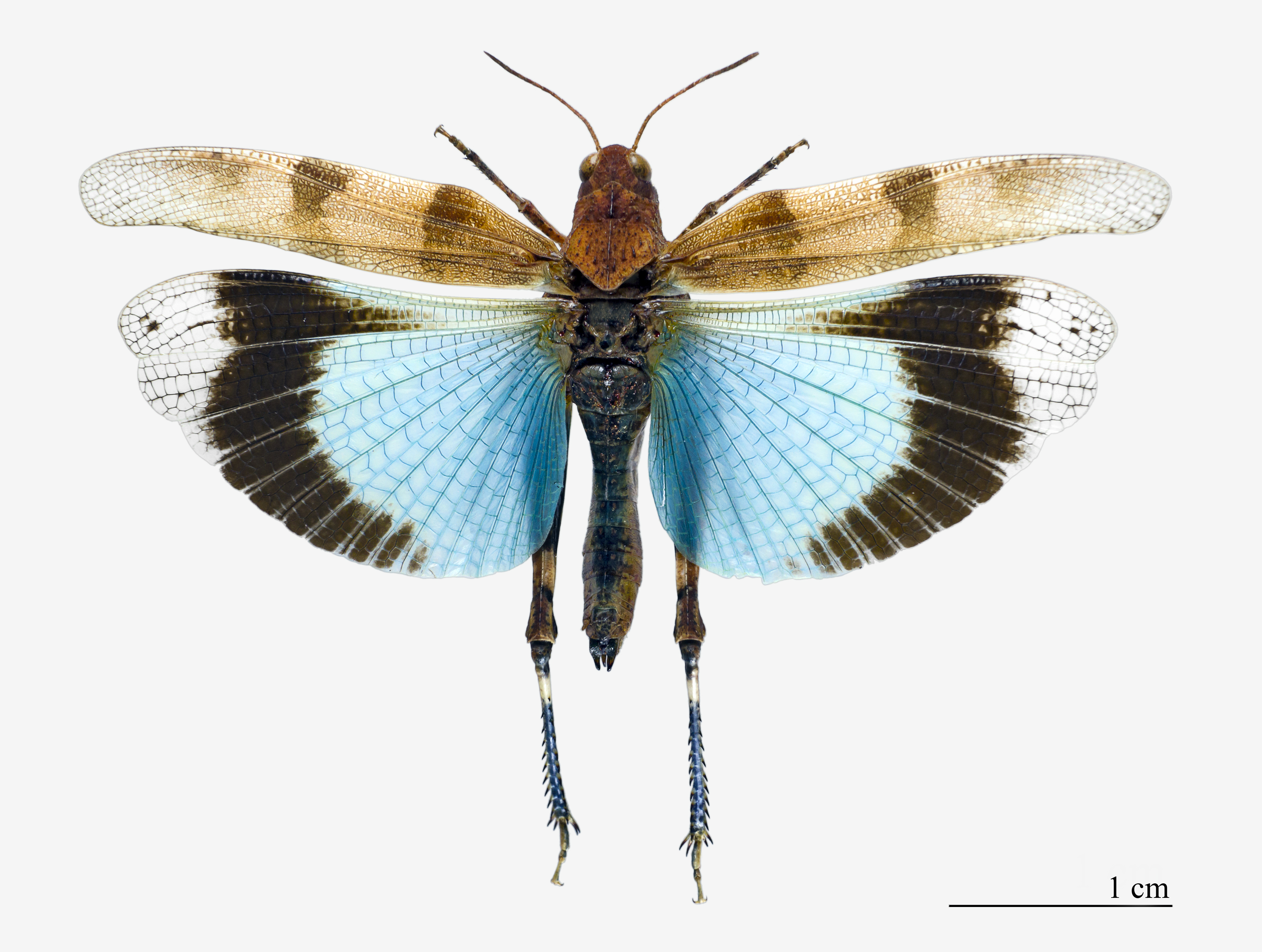

Scientific classification
- Kingdom: Animalia
- Phylum: Arthropoda
- Clade: Pancrustacea
- Class: Insecta
- Order: Orthoptera
- Suborder: Caelifera
- Family: Acrididae
- Subfamily: Oedipodinae
- Tribe: Oedipodini
- Genus: Oedipoda
- Species: O. caerulescens

Binomial name
- Oedipoda caerulescens (Linnaeus, 1758)

Synonyms
- Oedipoda fasciata Fischer, 1853

= Oedipoda caerulescens =

Species of grasshopper

Close-Up of a Oedipoda caerulescens

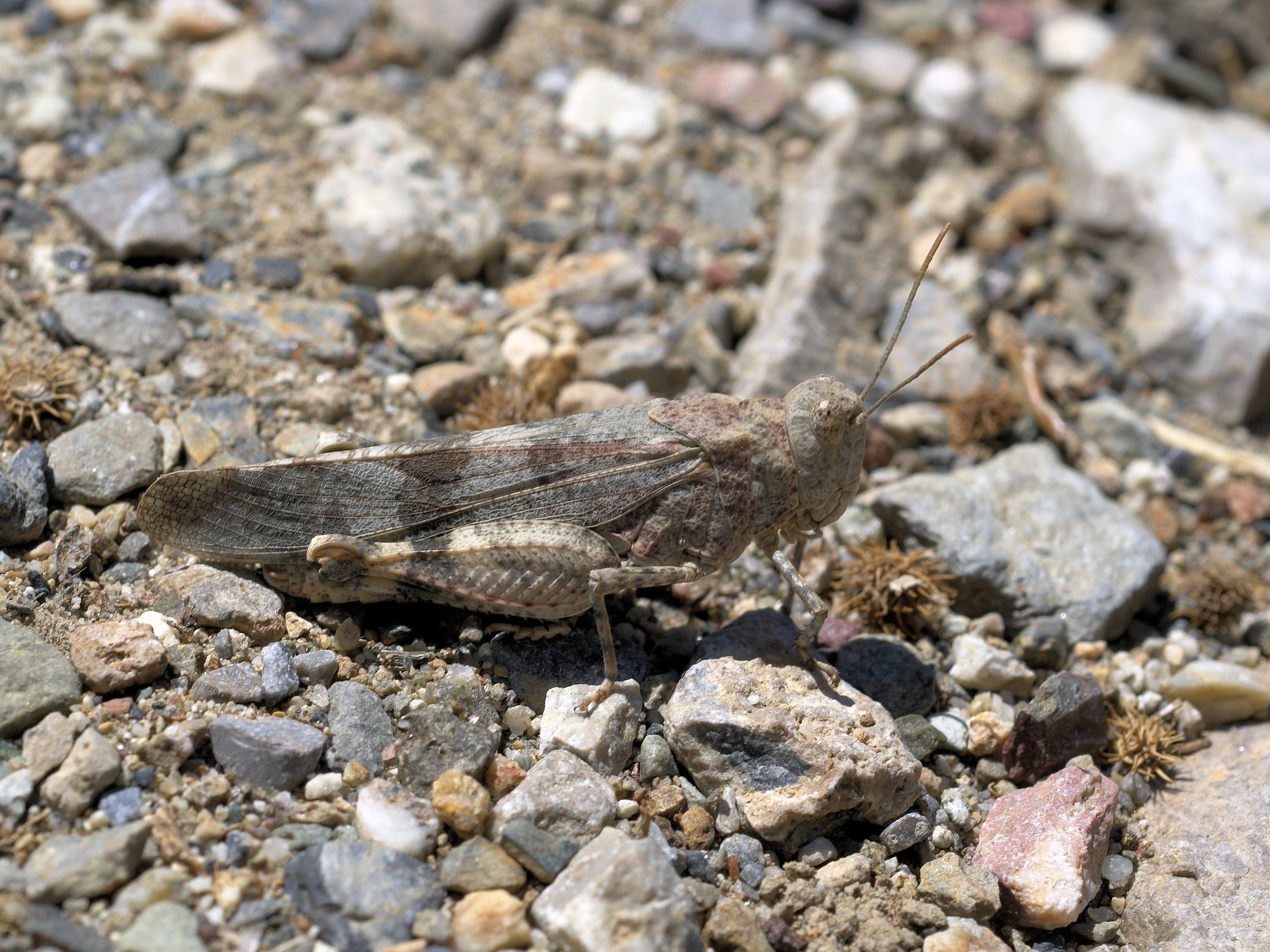
Oedipoda caerulescens

The blue-winged grasshopper, Oedipoda caerulescens, is a grasshopper in the genus Oedipoda.

== Distribution ==
This species occurs in Europe, North Africa and Asia. It was recently rediscovered in the Maltese islands.

== Morphological description ==
Oedipoda caerulescens is a medium-sized grasshopper, between 15 and 21 mm for males and between 22 and 28 mm for females. The body coloration varies greatly depending on the substrate on which the animals have developed: reddish brown, gray, yellowish, or even completely dark or bright. The forewings are crossed most often by two or three pale bands, but the most striking characteristic, very visible when the insect flies away, is the bright coloration of the hind wings, a beautiful turquoise highlighted with a black marginal stripe. Furthermore, the posterior femora have a notch on their upper surface. At rest, confusion is possible with other Oedipoda species such as O. germanica.

== Ecology ==
Oedipoda caerulescens frequents dry areas with low and open vegetation: dunes, heathlands, grasslands on sand and sunlit limestone rocks. Many stations correspond to land recently used for human activities, such as coal spoil heaps, quarries and pits, the ballast of railway tracks, etc. It is exclusively a terrestrial insect, and its cryptic coloration often matches its substrate. It presses itself to the ground and remains motionless, and jumps only at the very close approach of danger. A remarkable behavior is the "hook" landing which serves to confuse potential attackers. Thus, the grasshopper lands and swings round to face the direction it has come from. The sudden disappearance of the blue hind wings of the adult makes it difficult for predators to shift quickly enough to a different kind of search to relocate the prey. The female lays her eggs in bare, dry soil. In this species, acoustic emissions are virtually nonexistent. The diet consists mainly of grasses.

== Subspecies ==
- Oedipoda caerulescens armoricana Sellier, 1948
- Oedipoda caerulescens caerulescens (Linnaeus, 1758)
- Oedipoda caerulescens nigrothoracica Görtler, 1948
- Oedipoda caerulescens sulfurescens Saussure, 1884
