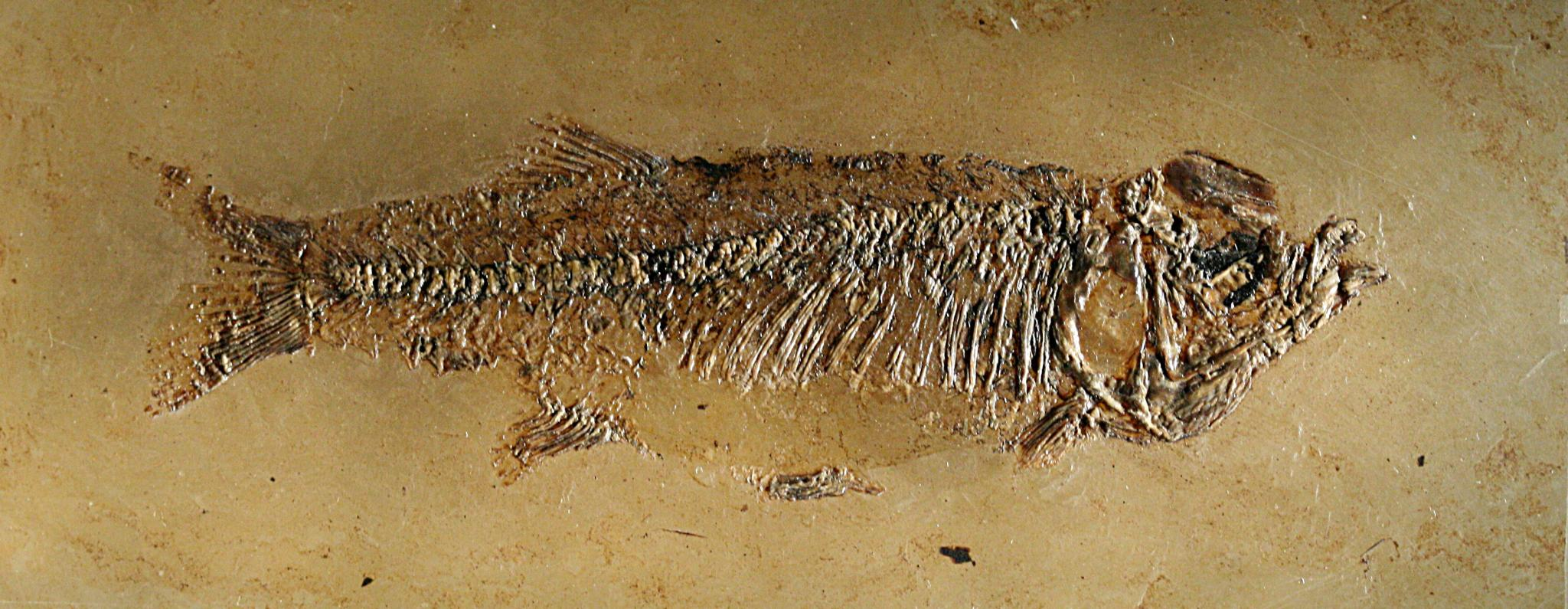
- Thaumaturus intermedius

Scientific classification
- Kingdom: Animalia
- Phylum: Chordata
- Class: Actinopterygii
- Order: Salmoniformes
- Genus: †Thaumaturus; Reuss, 1844

= Thaumaturus =

Thaumaturus Temporal range: Eocene 48.6–40.0 Ma

Extinct genus of fishes

Thaumaturus is an extinct genus of prehistoric ray-finned fish.

== See also ==
- Prehistoric fish
- List of prehistoric bony fish
