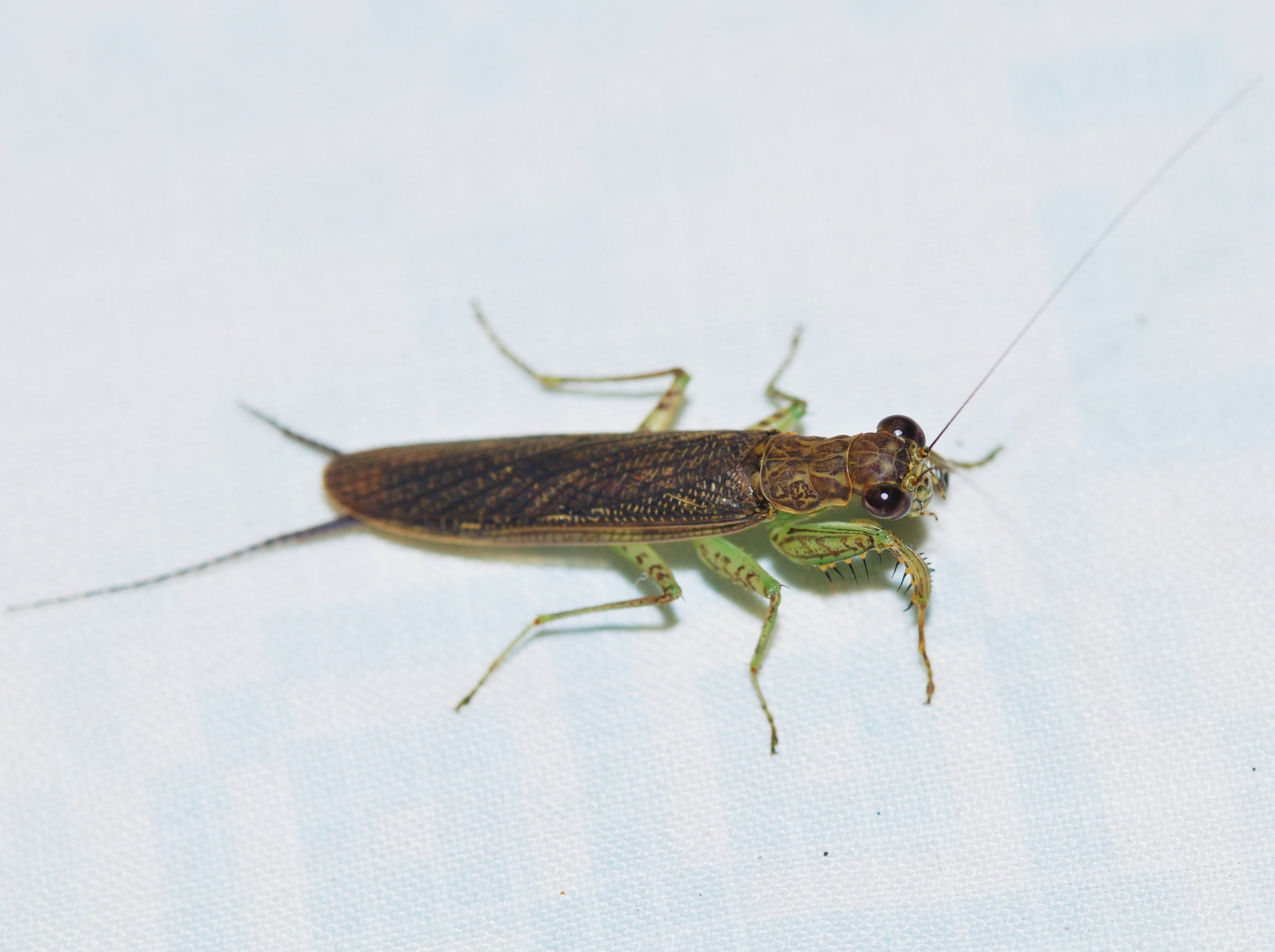
- Chaeteessa

Scientific classification
- Kingdom: Animalia
- Phylum: Arthropoda
- Clade: Pancrustacea
- Class: Insecta
- Order: Mantodea
- Superfamily: Chaeteessoidea; Handlirsch, 1920
- Family: Chaeteessidae; Handlirsch, 1920

Genera
- See text

Synonyms
- Archephemeridae Piton, 1940

= Chaeteessidae =

Chaeteessidae Temporal range: Paleocene–Recent

Family of insects

Chaeteessidae is a family of praying mantises. It contains a single extant genus, Chaeteessa, native to South America which is thought to be the most primitive and earliest diverging lineage of living mantises. Fossil genera are known from the Paleogene of Eurasia and North America.

== Genera ==
=== Extant ===
- Chaeteessa

=== Extinct ===
- †Arvernineura Piton, 1940 Menat Formation, France, Paleocene (Selandian)
- †Louispitonia Schubnel and Nel, 2019 (=Archaeophlebia Piton 1940) Menat Formation, France, Paleocene (Selandian)
- †Lithophotina Cockerell, 1908 Florissant Formation, Colorado, United States, Eocene
- †Megaphotina Gratshev and Zherikhin, 1993 Bol'shaya Svetlovodnaya, Primorsky, Russia, Eocene

Indeterminate species are also known from French Oise amber, dating to the Eocene (Ypresian)

== See also ==
- List of mantis genera and species
