= Wernerella =

Wernerella may refer to:

- Wernerella (fungus), a genus of fungi in the family Mycosphaerellaceae
- Wernerella (grasshopper), a genus of insects in the subfamily Oedipodinae
