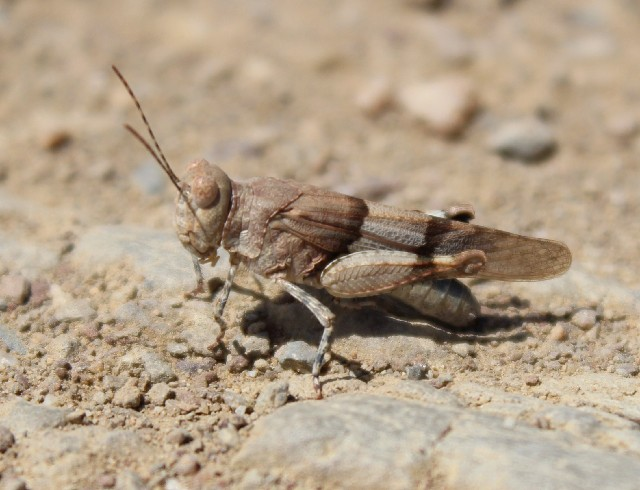
- Sphingonotus lluciapomaresi, Iberian sand grasshopper

Conservation status
- Least Concern (IUCN 3.1)

Scientific classification
- Kingdom: Animalia
- Phylum: Arthropoda
- Clade: Pancrustacea
- Class: Insecta
- Order: Orthoptera
- Suborder: Caelifera
- Family: Acrididae
- Genus: Sphingonotus
- Species: S. lluciapomaresi

Binomial name
- Sphingonotus lluciapomaresi (Defaut, 2005)

= Sphingonotus lluciapomaresi =

Species of grasshopper

Sphingonotus lluciapomaresi, the Iberian sand Grasshopper, is a species of band-winged grasshopper in the family Acrididae. It is found on the Iberian Peninsula.

The IUCN conservation status of Sphingonotus lluciapomaresi is "LC", least concern, with no immediate threat to the species' survival. The IUCN status was assessed in 2015.
