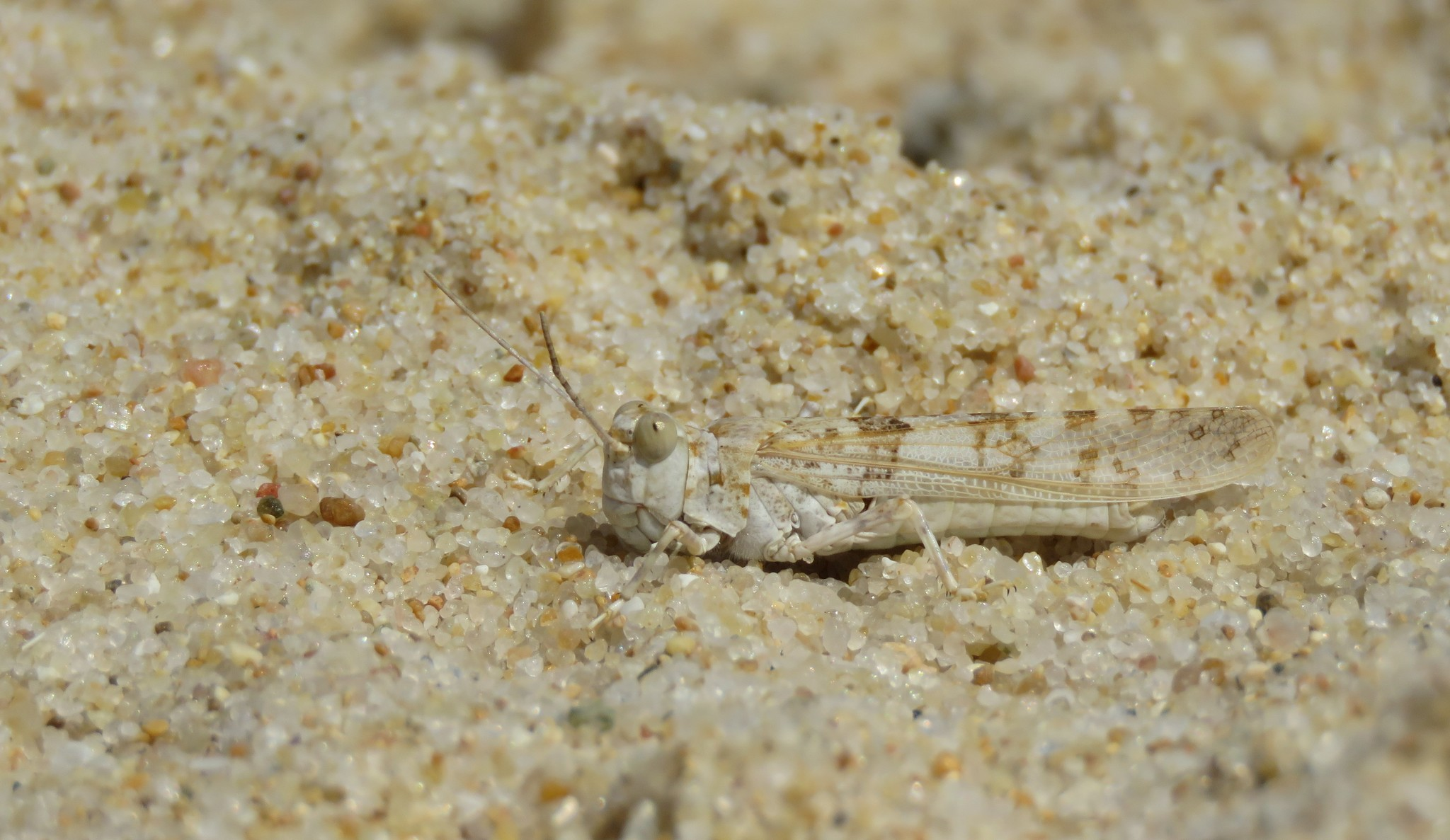
- Sphingonotus imitans, Algarve sand grasshopper, Portugal

Conservation status
- Vulnerable (IUCN 3.1)

Scientific classification
- Kingdom: Animalia
- Phylum: Arthropoda
- Clade: Pancrustacea
- Class: Insecta
- Order: Orthoptera
- Suborder: Caelifera
- Family: Acrididae
- Genus: Sphingonotus
- Species: S. imitans

Binomial name
- Sphingonotus imitans Brunner von Wattenwyl, 1882

= Sphingonotus imitans =

Species of band-winged grasshopper

Sphingonotus imitans, the Algarve sand grasshopper, is a species of band-winged grasshopper in the family Acrididae. It is found on the Iberian Peninsula.

The IUCN conservation status of Sphingonotus imitans is "VU", vulnerable. The species faces a high risk of endangerment in the medium term. The IUCN status was assessed in 2015.
