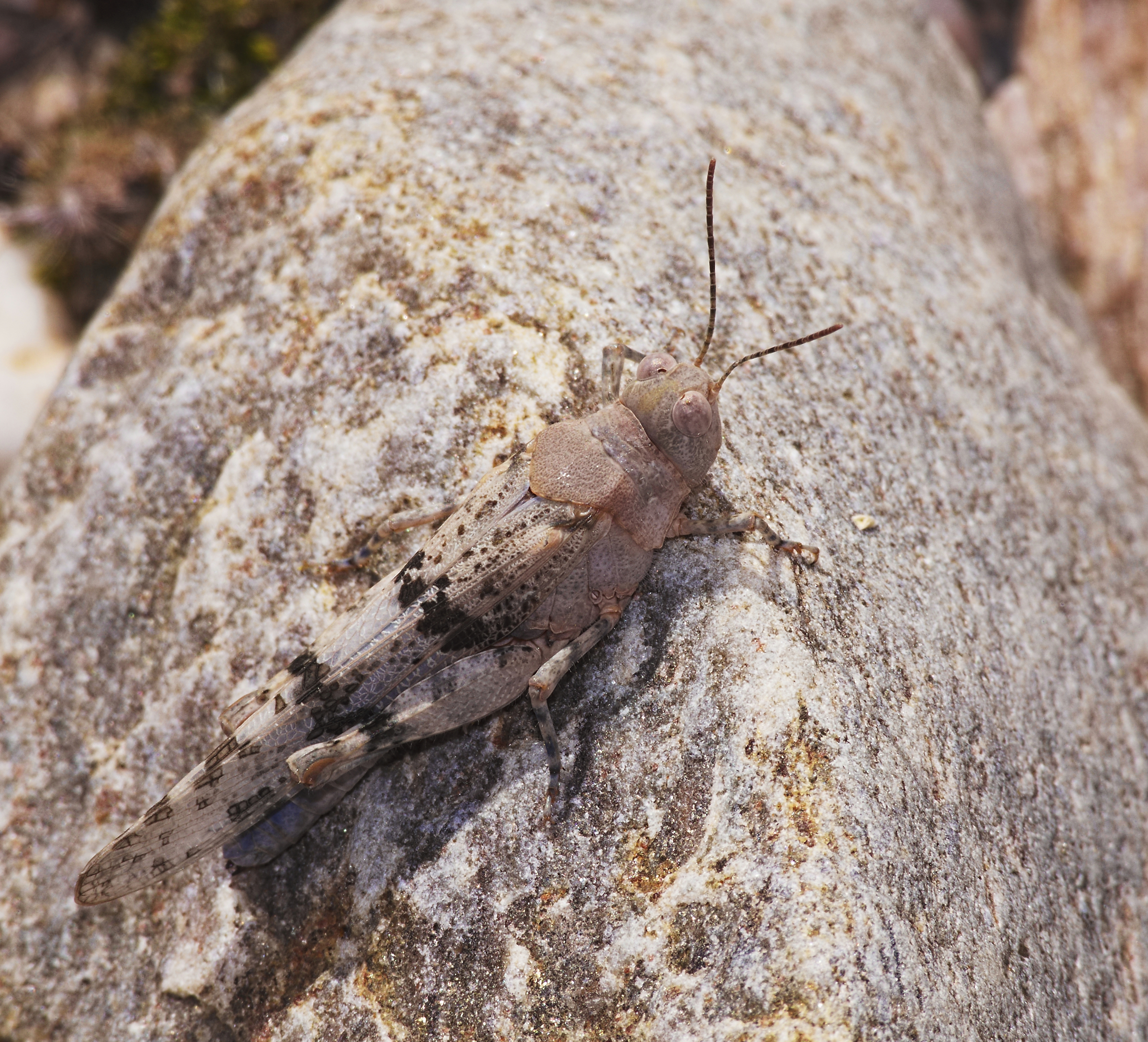
- Sphingonotus caerulans Germany

Scientific classification
- Kingdom: Animalia
- Phylum: Arthropoda
- Clade: Pancrustacea
- Class: Insecta
- Order: Orthoptera
- Suborder: Caelifera
- Family: Acrididae
- Genus: Sphingonotus
- Species: S. caerulans

Binomial name
- Sphingonotus caerulans (Linnaeus, 1767)

= Sphingonotus caerulans =

Species of grasshopper

Sphingonotus caerulans is a species belonging to the family Acrididae subfamily Oedipodinae.The northern limit is northern France, eastern Sweden and southern Finland. In Central and Northern Europe the species is restricted to low-vegetation special habitats, in which the soil remains free of vegetation through constant rearrangement (pioneer species of open habitats). It is very common in the Mediterranean area, especially in rocky heaths. According to the IUCN, the conservation status of Sphingonotus caerulans is LC (least concern).

Close-Up of a Sphingonotus caerulans
