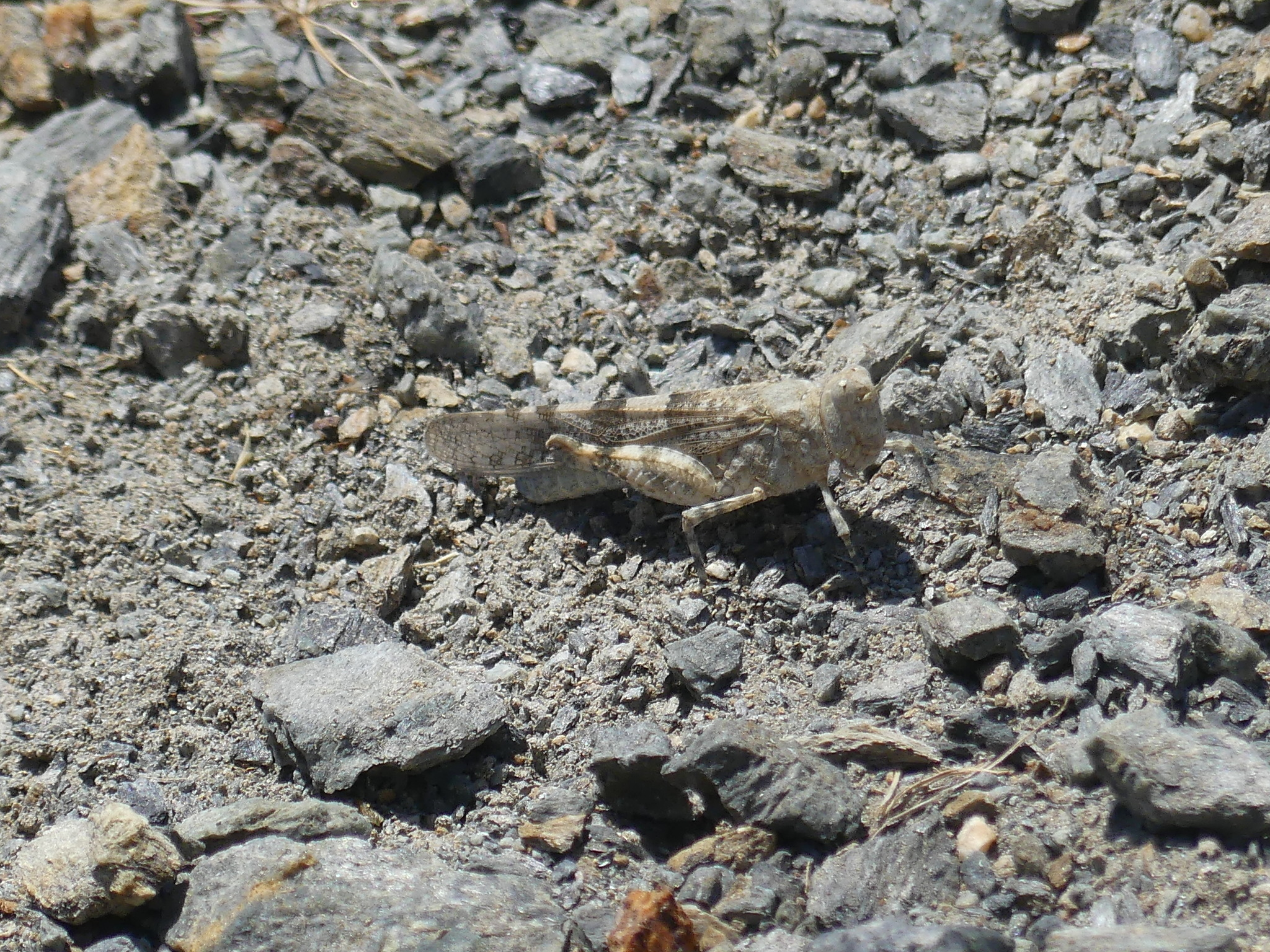
- Sphingonotus corsicus, Corsican sand grasshopper, France

Conservation status
- Least Concern (IUCN 3.1)

Scientific classification
- Kingdom: Animalia
- Phylum: Arthropoda
- Clade: Pancrustacea
- Class: Insecta
- Order: Orthoptera
- Suborder: Caelifera
- Family: Acrididae
- Subfamily: Oedipodinae
- Tribe: Sphingonotini
- Genus: Sphingonotus
- Species: S. corsicus

Binomial name
- Sphingonotus corsicus Chopard, 1924

= Sphingonotus corsicus =

Species of band-winged grasshopper

Sphingonotus corsicus, the Corsican sand grasshopper, is a species of band-winged grasshopper in the family Acrididae. It is found in Corsica and other Mediterranean countries.

The IUCN conservation status of Sphingonotus corsicus is "LC", least concern, with no immediate threat to the species' survival. The IUCN status was assessed in 2015.
