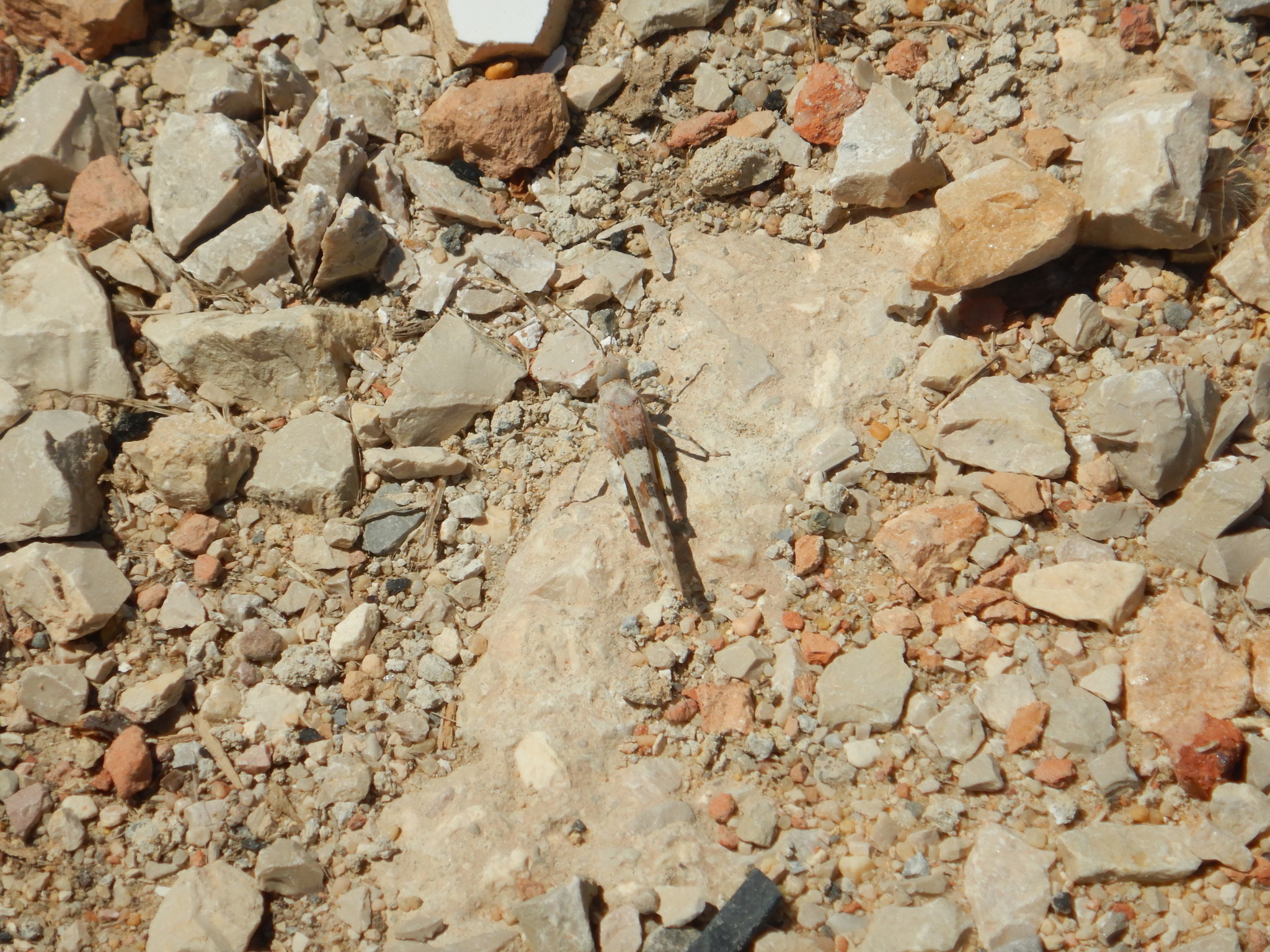
- Sphingonotus azurescens, azure sand grasshopper, Portugal

Conservation status
- Least Concern (IUCN 3.1)

Scientific classification
- Kingdom: Animalia
- Phylum: Arthropoda
- Clade: Pancrustacea
- Class: Insecta
- Order: Orthoptera
- Suborder: Caelifera
- Family: Acrididae
- Genus: Sphingonotus
- Species: S. azurescens

Binomial name
- Sphingonotus azurescens (Rambur, 1838)

= Sphingonotus azurescens =

Species of band-winged grasshopper

Sphingonotus azurescens, the azure sand grasshopper, is a species of band-winged grasshopper in the family Acrididae. It is found in southern Europe and northern Africa.

The IUCN conservation status of Sphingonotus azurescens is "LC", least concern, with no immediate threat to the species' survival. The IUCN status was assessed in 2015.
