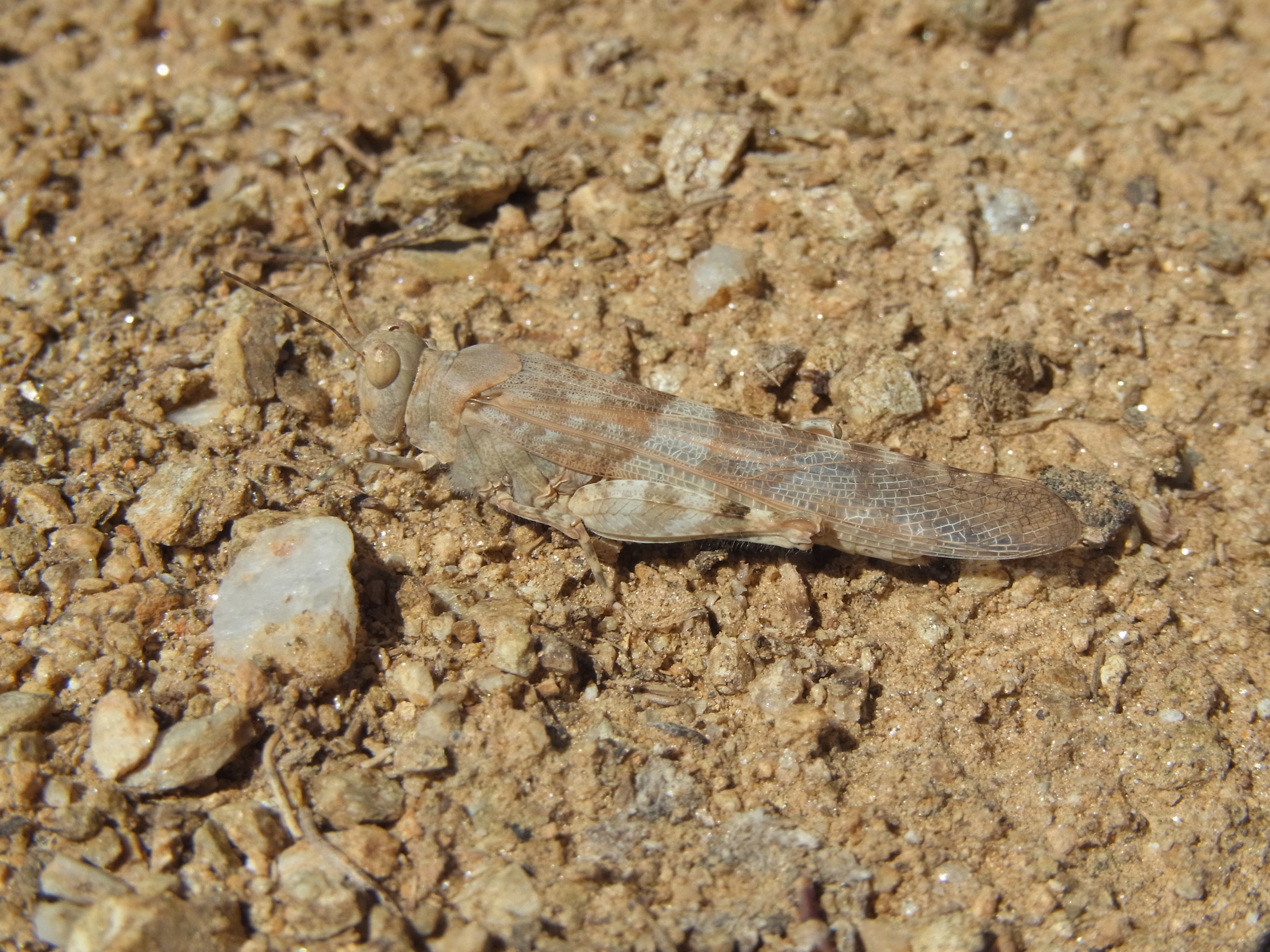
- Sphingonotus rubescens

Conservation status
- Least Concern (IUCN 3.1)

Scientific classification
- Kingdom: Animalia
- Phylum: Arthropoda
- Clade: Pancrustacea
- Class: Insecta
- Order: Orthoptera
- Suborder: Caelifera
- Family: Acrididae
- Subfamily: Oedipodinae
- Tribe: Sphingonotini
- Genus: Sphingonotus
- Species: S. rubescens

Binomial name
- Sphingonotus rubescens (Walker, 1870)

= Sphingonotus rubescens =

Species of grasshopper

Sphingonotus rubescens, the desert sand grasshopper, is a species of band-winged grasshopper in the family Acrididae. It is found in the Palearctic.

== Subspecies ==
These subspecies belong to the species Sphingonotus rubescens:

- Sphingonotus rubescens afghanicus Mistshenko, 1937
- Sphingonotus rubescens burri Chopard, 1936
- Sphingonotus rubescens fallax Mistshenko, 1937
- Sphingonotus rubescens fasciatus Mistshenko, 1937
- Sphingonotus rubescens rubescens (Walker, 1870)
- Sphingonotus rubescens subfasciatus Bey-Bienko, 1951
