= Wernerella (fungus) =

Scientific classification
- Kingdom: Fungi
- Division: Ascomycota
- Class: Dothideomycetes
- Order: Capnodiales
- Family: Mycosphaerellaceae
- Genus: Wernerella; Nav.-Ros., Roux & Giralt

Genus of fungi

Wernerella is a genus of fungi in the family Mycosphaerellaceae.
