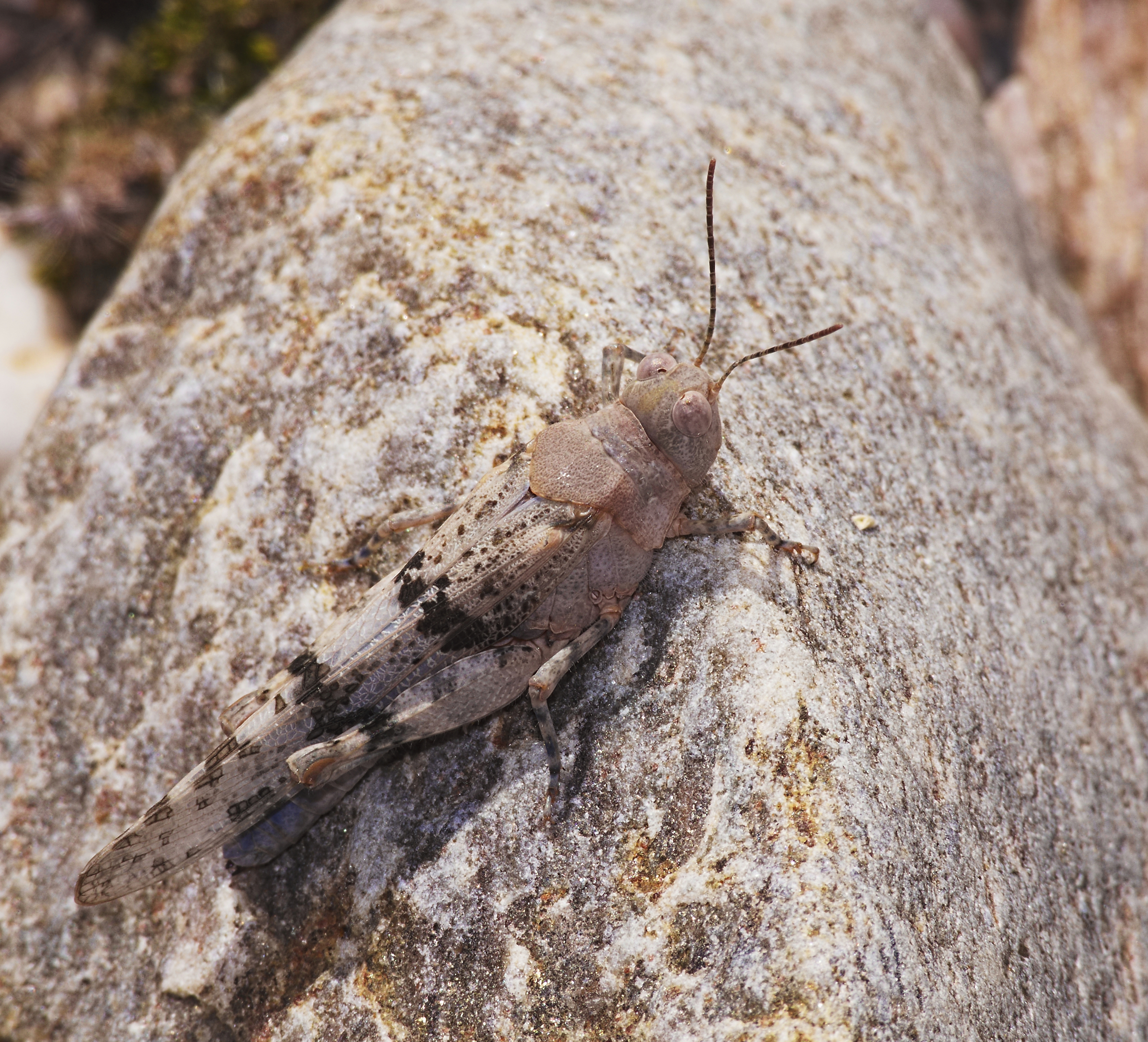
- Sphingonotus caerulans in Germany

Scientific classification
- Kingdom: Animalia
- Phylum: Arthropoda
- Clade: Pancrustacea
- Class: Insecta
- Order: Orthoptera
- Suborder: Caelifera
- Family: Acrididae
- Subfamily: Oedipodinae
- Tribe: Sphingonotini
- Genus: Sphingonotus; Fieber, 1852

Synonyms
- Fortunata Bolívar, 1908; Granada Koçak & Kemal, 2008; Jacobsiella Harz, 1975; Pseudosphingonotus Shumakov, 1963; Wernerella Karny, 1907

= Sphingonotus =

Genus of grasshoppers

Sphingonotus is a genus of grasshoppers in the family Acrididae, subfamily Oedipodinae, found in Europe Africa, Asia and Australia.

== Species ==
The Orthoptera Species File lists:

subgenus Neosphingonotus Benediktov, 1998

- species group azurescens (Rambur, 1838)
1. Sphingonotus azurescens (Rambur, 1838)
2. Sphingonotus canariensis Saussure, 1884
3. Sphingonotus finotianus (Saussure, 1885)
4. Sphingonotus fuerteventurae Husemann, 2008
5. Sphingonotus morini (Defaut, 2005)
6. Sphingonotus pachecoi (Bolívar, 1908)
7. Sphingonotus sublaevis (Bolívar, 1908)
8. Sphingonotus tricinctus (Walker, 1870)
- unplaced in species group
1. Sphingonotus almeriense Llucià Pomares, 2013
2. Sphingonotus angulatus Uvarov, 1922
3. Sphingonotus dentatus Predtechenskii, 1937
4. Sphingonotus nodulosus Llucià Pomares, 2013
5. Sphingonotus paradoxus Bey-Bienko, 1948
6. Sphingonotus pictus Werner, 1905

subgenus Parasphingonotus Benediktov & Husemann, 2009

1. Sphingonotus femoralis Uvarov, 1933
2. Sphingonotus radioserratus Johnsen, 1985
3. Sphingonotus turkanae Uvarov, 1938

subgenus Sphingonotus Fieber, 1852

- species group caerulans (Linnaeus, 1767)
1. Sphingonotus caerulans (Linnaeus, 1767) - type species (as Gryllus caerulans = S. caerulans caerulans L.)
2. Sphingonotus corsicus Chopard, 1924
3. Sphingonotus gypsicola Llucià Pomares, 2006
4. Sphingonotus lluciapomaresi (Defaut, 2005)
5. Sphingonotus lusitanicus Ebner, 1941
6. Sphingonotus rubescens (Walker, 1870)
7. Sphingonotus willemsei Mistshenko, 1937
- unplaced in species group
1. Sphingonotus africanus (Johnsen, 1985)
2. Sphingonotus albipennis Krauss, 1902
3. Sphingonotus altayensis Zheng & Ren, 1993
4. Sphingonotus amplofemurus Huang, 1982
5. Sphingonotus arenarius (Lucas, 1847)
6. Sphingonotus aserbeidshanicus Ramme, 1951
7. Sphingonotus asperus (Brullé, 1840)
8. Sphingonotus atlanticus (Popov, 1984)
9. Sphingonotus atropurpureus Uvarov, 1930
10. Sphingonotus balteatus (Serville, 1838)
11. Sphingonotus barrizensis Descamps, 1967
12. Sphingonotus basutensis (Dirsh, 1956)
13. Sphingonotus beybienkoi Mistshenko, 1937
14. Sphingonotus brackensis Usmani, 2008
15. Sphingonotus brasilianus Saussure, 1888
16. Sphingonotus burqinensis Zheng & Yang, 2006
17. Sphingonotus caerulistriatus Zheng & Ren, 2007
18. Sphingonotus candidus Costa, 1885
19. Sphingonotus capensis Saussure, 1884
20. Sphingonotus changlangensis Gupta, Chandra & Husemann, 2019
21. Sphingonotus coerulipes Uvarov, 1922
22. Sphingonotus collenettei (Uvarov, 1930)
23. Sphingonotus crivellarii Jannone, 1936
24. Sphingonotus diadematus Vosseler, 1902
25. Sphingonotus ebneri Mistshenko, 1937
26. Sphingonotus elegans Mistshenko, 1937
27. Sphingonotus erlixensis Zheng, Yang, Zhang & Wang, 2007
28. Sphingonotus erythropterus Sjöstedt, 1920
29. Sphingonotus eurasius Mistshenko, 1937
30. Sphingonotus fuscoirroratus (Stål, 1861)
31. Sphingonotus fuscus Predtechenskii, 1937
32. Sphingonotus ganglbaueri Krauss, 1907
33. Sphingonotus glabimarginis Zheng, Yang, Zhang & Wang, 2007
34. Sphingonotus gobicus Chogsomzhav, 1975
35. Sphingonotus guanchus (Johnsen, 1985)
36. Sphingonotus haitensis (Saussure, 1861)
37. Sphingonotus haitiensis (Saussure, 1861)
38. Sphingonotus halocnemi Uvarov, 1925
39. Sphingonotus halophilus Bey-Bienko, 1929
40. Sphingonotus hierichonicus Uvarov, 1923
41. Sphingonotus hoboksarensis Zheng & Ren, 1993
42. Sphingonotus huangi Otte, 1995
43. Sphingonotus hyalopterus Zheng & Cao, 1989
44. Sphingonotus imitans Brunner von Wattenwyl, 1882
45. Sphingonotus indus Saussure, 1884
46. Sphingonotus insularis (Popov, 1957)
47. Sphingonotus isfaghanicus Predtechenskii, 1937
48. Sphingonotus kashmirensis Uvarov, 1925
49. Sphingonotus kirgisicus Mistshenko, 1937
50. Sphingonotus kueideensis Yin, 1984
51. Sphingonotus lavandulus Popov, 1980
52. Sphingonotus laxus Uvarov, 1952
53. Sphingonotus lipicus Zheng & Hang, 1974
54. Sphingonotus lobulatus Karny, 1910
55. Sphingonotus longipennis Saussure, 1884
56. Sphingonotus lucasii Saussure, 1888
57. Sphingonotus lucidus Mistshenko, 1937
58. Sphingonotus luteus Krauss, 1893
59. Sphingonotus maculatus Uvarov, 1925
60. Sphingonotus maroccanus Uvarov, 1930
61. Sphingonotus menglaensis Wei & Zheng, 2005
62. Sphingonotus micronacrolius Zheng & Ren, 1994
63. Sphingonotus minutus Mistshenko, 1937
64. Sphingonotus miramae Mistshenko, 1937
65. Sphingonotus mongolicus Saussure, 1888
66. Sphingonotus montanus Mistshenko, 1937
67. Sphingonotus nadigi Uvarov, 1933
68. Sphingonotus nebulosus (Fischer von Waldheim, 1846)
69. Sphingonotus nigripennis (Serville, 1838)
70. Sphingonotus nigrofemoratus Huang & Chen, 1982
71. Sphingonotus niloticus Saussure, 1888
72. Sphingonotus ningsianus Zheng & Gow, 1981
73. Sphingonotus obscuratus (Walker, 1870)
74. Sphingonotus octofasciatus (Serville, 1838)
75. Sphingonotus orissaensis Jago & Bhowmik, 1990
76. Sphingonotus otogensis Zheng & Yang, 1997
77. Sphingonotus pamiricus Ramme, 1930
78. Sphingonotus peliepiproct Zheng & Gong, 2003
79. Sphingonotus personatus (Zanon, 1926)
80. Sphingonotus petilocus Huang, 1982
81. Sphingonotus picteti (Krauss, 1892)
82. Sphingonotus pictipes Uvarov & Dirsh, 1952
83. Sphingonotus pilosus Saussure, 1884
84. Sphingonotus pseudatlas Defaut & François, 2021
85. Sphingonotus punensis Dirsh, 1969
86. Sphingonotus qinghaiensis Yin, 1984
87. Sphingonotus rufipes Predtechenskii, 1937
88. Sphingonotus rugosus (Bland & Gangwere, 1998)
89. Sphingonotus salinus (Pallas, 1773)
90. Sphingonotus satrapes Saussure, 1884
91. Sphingonotus savignyi Saussure, 1884
92. Sphingonotus scabriculus Stål, 1876
93. Sphingonotus sindhensis Bughio, Wagan & Sultana, 2011
94. Sphingonotus somalicus (Johnsen, 1985)
95. Sphingonotus striatus Li & Zheng, 1993
96. Sphingonotus taiwanensis Cao, Shi & Yin, 2016
97. Sphingonotus takramaensis Zheng, Xi & Lian, 1994
98. Sphingonotus taolensis Zheng, 1992
99. Sphingonotus tenuipennis Mistshenko, 1937
100. Sphingonotus theodori Uvarov, 1923
101. Sphingonotus tipicus Zheng & Hang, 1974
102. Sphingonotus toliensis Zheng & Gong, 2003
103. Sphingonotus tristrial Zheng & Wang, 2006
104. Sphingonotus tsinlingensis Zheng, Tu & Liang, 1963
105. Sphingonotus turcicus Uvarov, 1930
106. Sphingonotus turcmenus Bey-Bienko, 1951
107. Sphingonotus tuxeni Ramme, 1952
108. Sphingonotus tzaidamicus Mistshenko, 1937
109. Sphingonotus uvarovi Chopard, 1924
110. Sphingonotus vitreus Saussure, 1888
111. Sphingonotus vosseleri Krauss, 1902
112. Sphingonotus wulumuqiensis Gong, Zheng & Niu, 2005
113. Sphingonotus yamalikeshanensis Gong, Zheng & Niu, 2005
114. Sphingonotus yantaiensis Yin, Xu & Yin, 2012
115. Sphingonotus yechengensis Zheng, Xi & Lian, 1994
116. Sphingonotus yenchihensis Zheng & Chiu, 1965
117. Sphingonotus yunnaneus Uvarov, 1925
118. Sphingonotus zandaensis Huang, 1981
119. Sphingonotus zebra Mistshenko, 1937
120. Sphingonotus zhangi Xu & Zheng, 2007
121. Sphingonotus zhengi Huo, 1994
122. Sphingonotus zhongningensis Cao, Shi & Yin, 2016
- “temporary names”
1. Sphingonotus carinatus Zheng, Li & Ding, 1995
2. Sphingonotus striatus Xu & Zheng, 2007

== Gallery ==
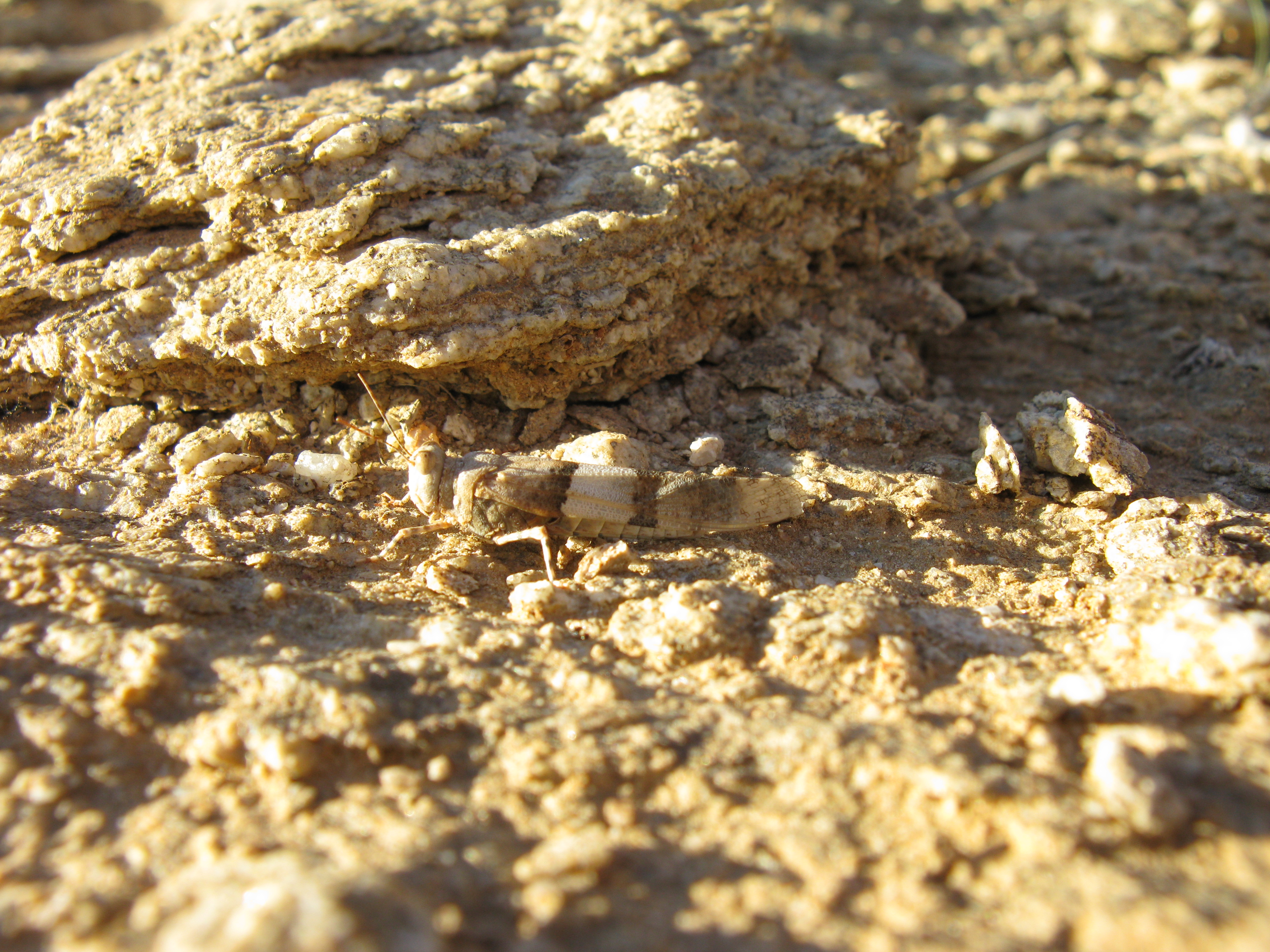

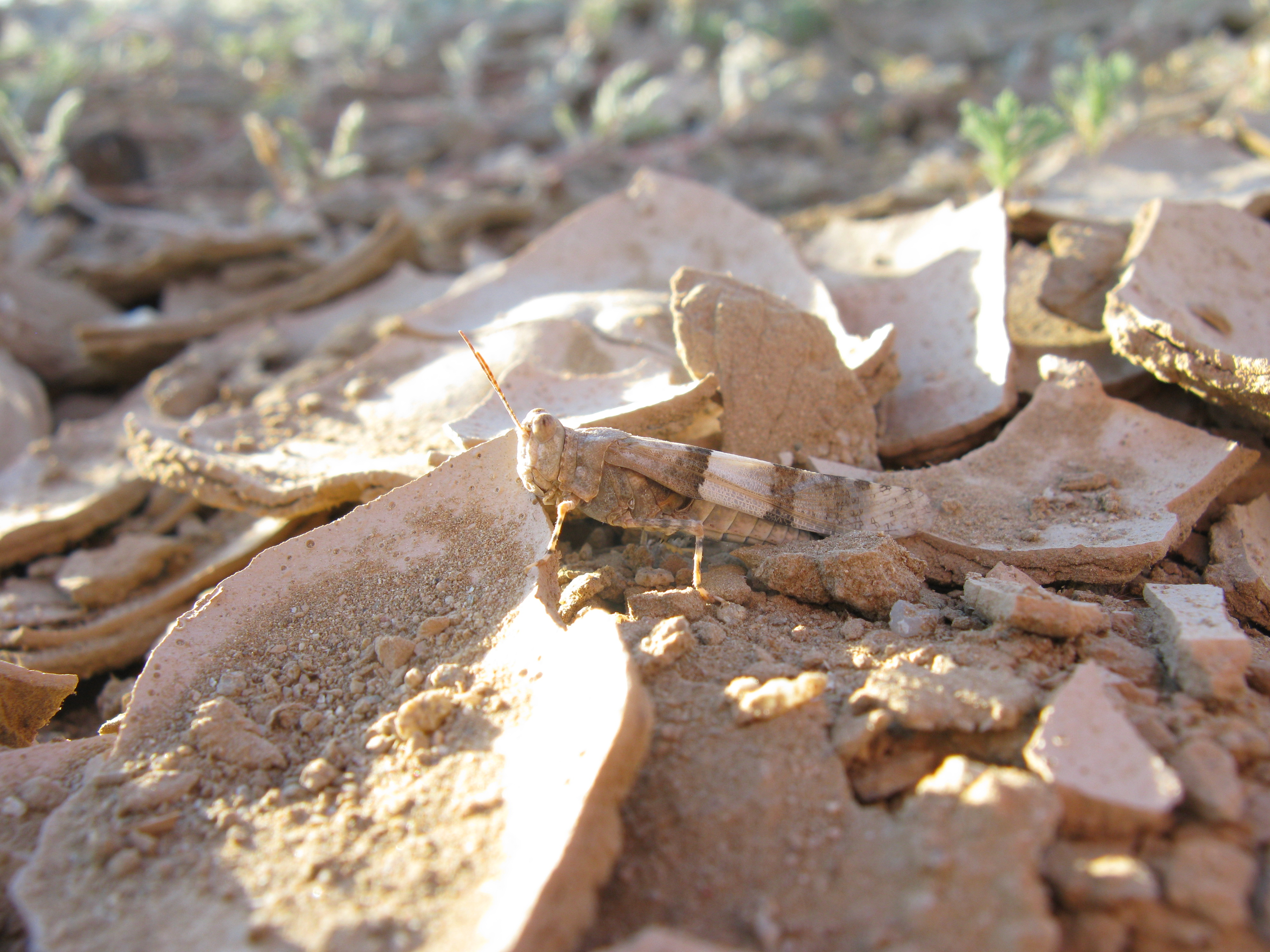

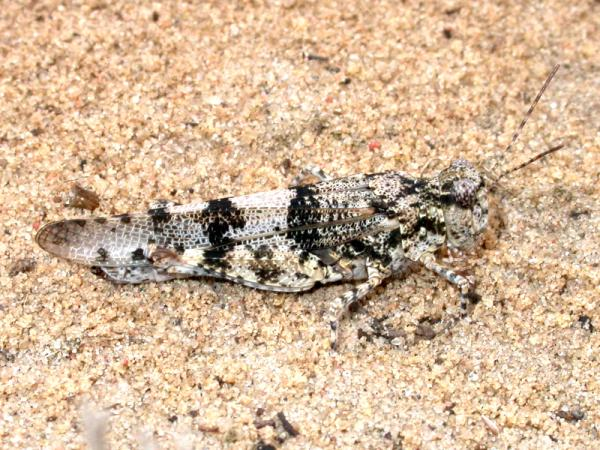
S. caerulans

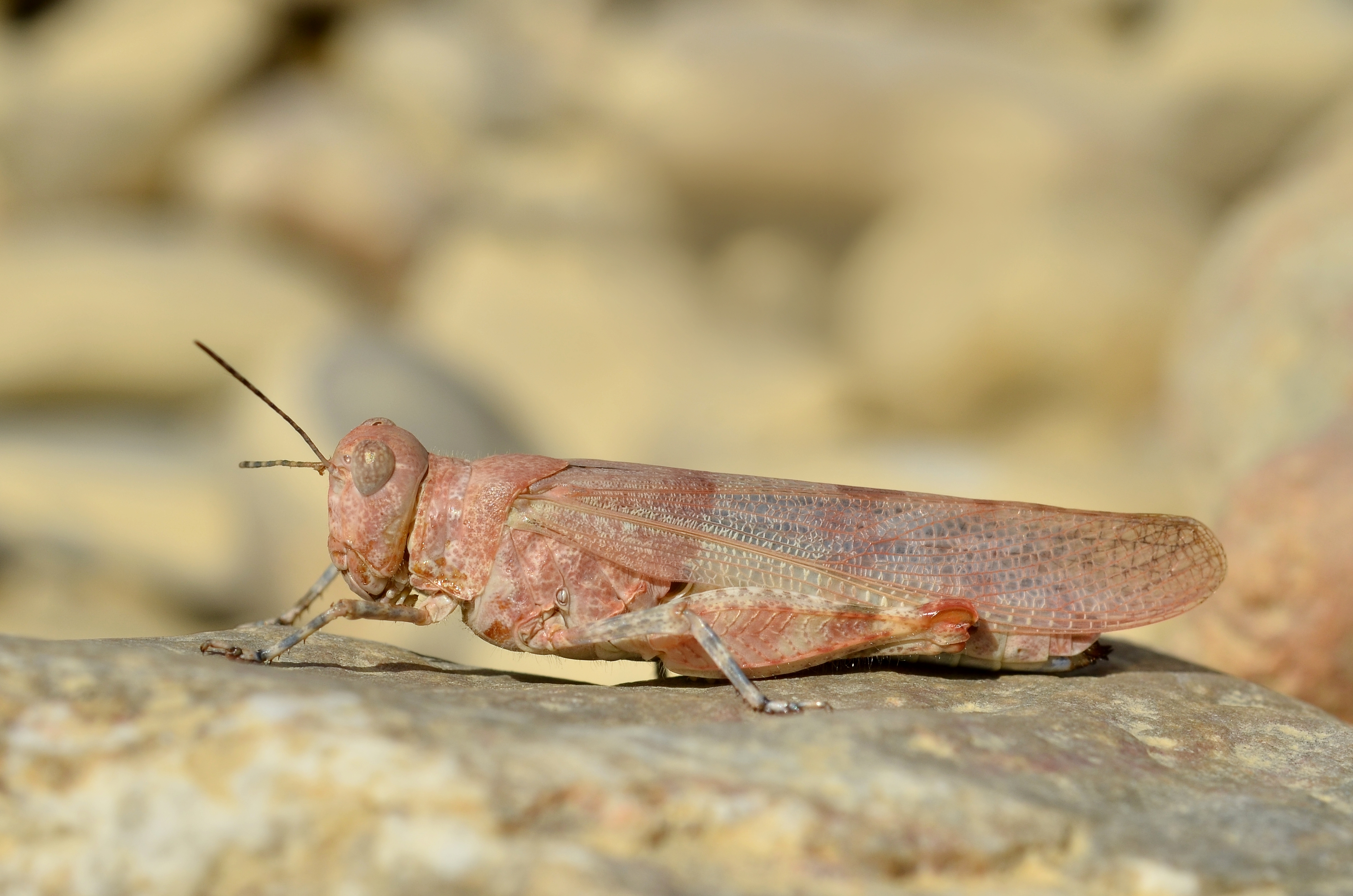

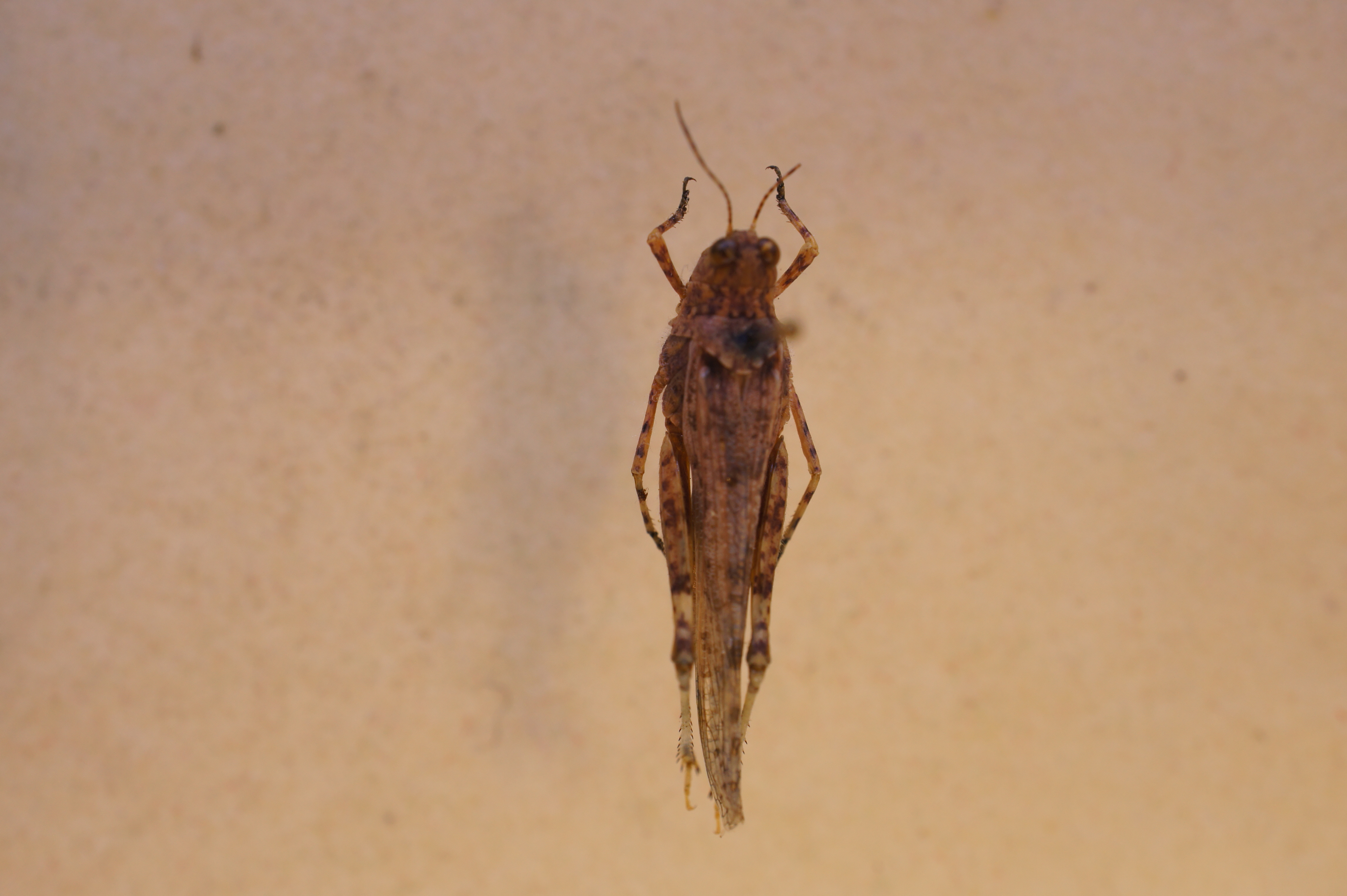
S. candidus
