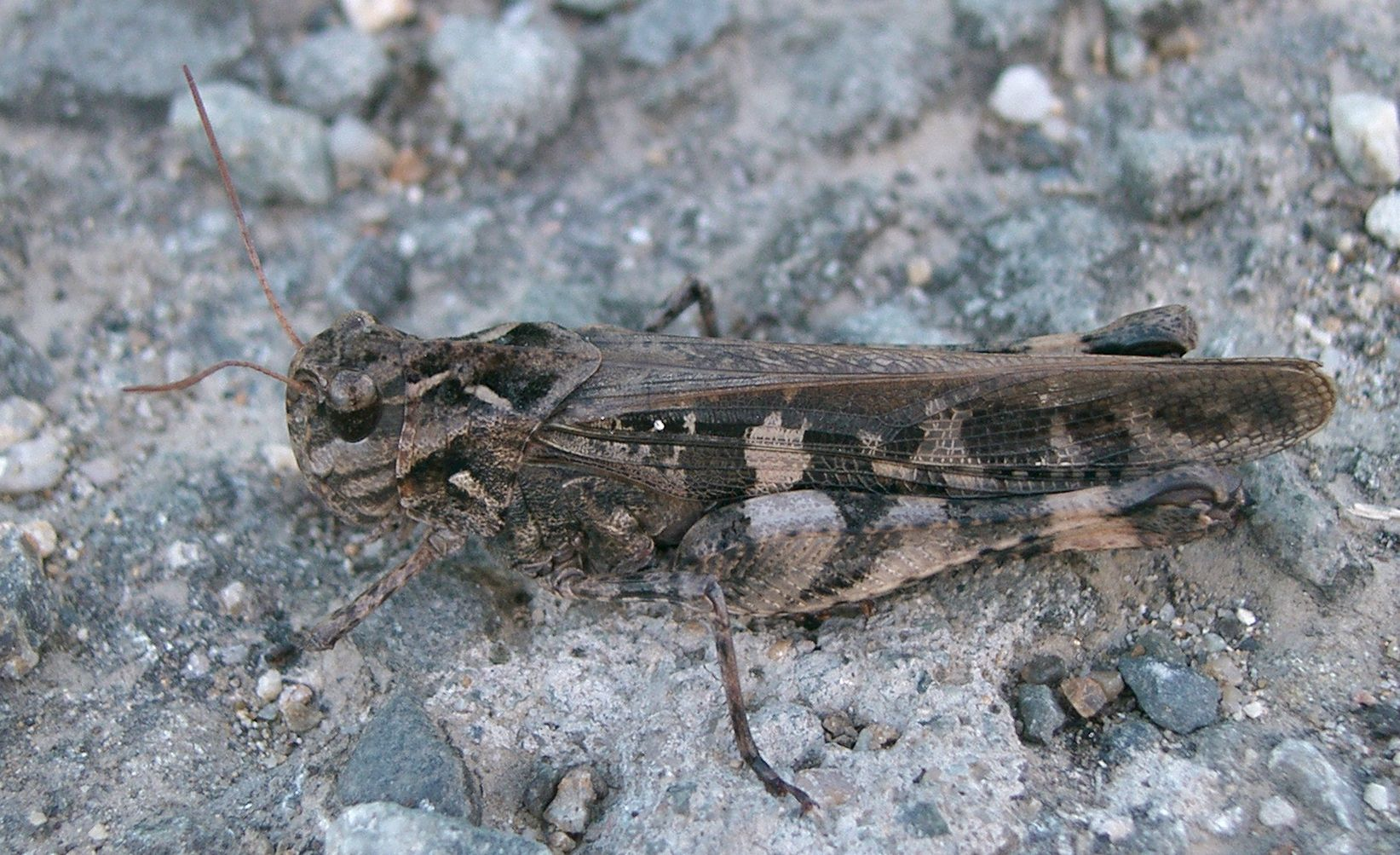
- Oedaleus infernalis

Scientific classification
- Kingdom: Animalia
- Phylum: Arthropoda
- Clade: Pancrustacea
- Class: Insecta
- Order: Orthoptera
- Suborder: Caelifera
- Family: Acrididae
- Subfamily: Oedipodinae
- Tribe: Locustini
- Genus: Oedaleus; Fieber, 1853

Synonyms
- Microgastrimargus Lee & Park, 1992; Oedalius Sjöstedt, 1920; Oedalus Voisin, 2003

= Oedaleus =

Genus of grasshoppers

Oedaleus is a genus of grasshoppers in the family Acrididae and tribe Locustini.

== Species ==
The Orthoptera Species File lists the following species:

1. Oedaleus abruptus (Thunberg, 1815)
2. Oedaleus australis Saussure, 1888
3. Oedaleus bimaculatus Zheng & Gong, 2001
4. Oedaleus carvalhoi Bolívar, 1889
5. Oedaleus cnecosopodius Zheng, 2000
6. Oedaleus decorus (Germar, 1825)
7. Oedaleus flavus (Linnaeus, 1758)
8. Oedaleus formosanus (Shiraki, 1910)
9. Oedaleus hyalinus Zheng & Mao, 1997
10. Oedaleus infernalis Saussure, 1884
11. Oedaleus inornatus Schulthess, 1898
12. Oedaleus instillatus Burr, 1900
13. Oedaleus interruptus (Kirby, 1902)
14. Oedaleus johnstoni Uvarov, 1941
15. Oedaleus kaohsiungensis Yin, Ye & Dang, 2015
16. Oedaleus manjius Chang, 1939
17. Oedaleus miniatus Uvarov, 1930
18. Oedaleus nadiae Ritchie, 1981
19. Oedaleus nantouensis Yin, Ye & Dang, 2015
20. Oedaleus nigeriensis Uvarov, 1926
21. Oedaleus nigripennis Zheng, 2005
22. Oedaleus nigrofasciatus (De Geer, 1773) - type species (as Acrydium nigrofasciatum De Geer)
23. Oedaleus obtusangulus Uvarov, 1936
24. Oedaleus plenus (Walker, 1870)
25. Oedaleus rosescens Uvarov, 1942
26. Oedaleus senegalensis (Krauss, 1877)
27. Oedaleus virgula (Snellen van Vollenhoven, 1869)
28. Oedaleus xiai Yin, Ye & Dang, 2015

== Gallery ==
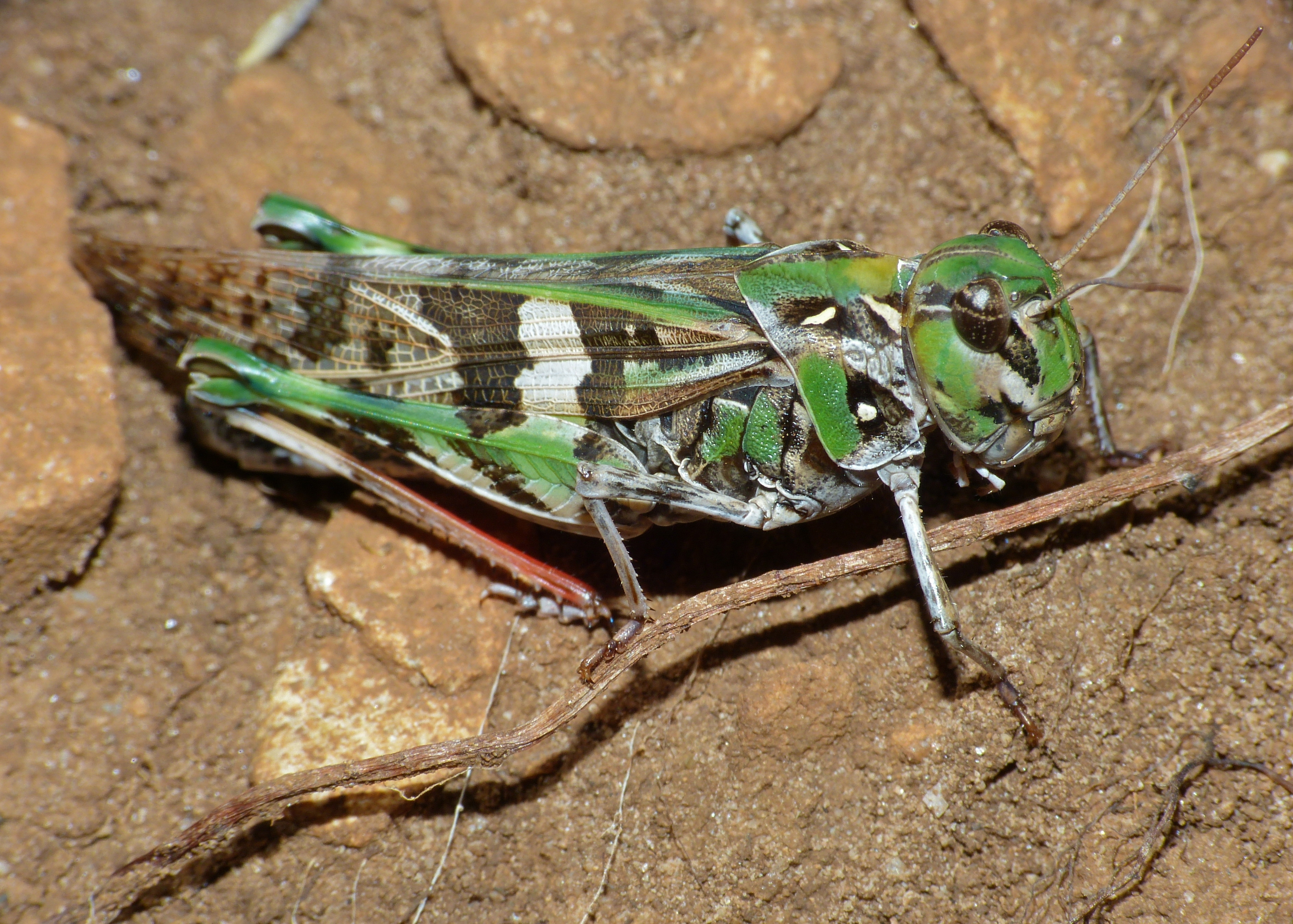
O. decorus (female, France)

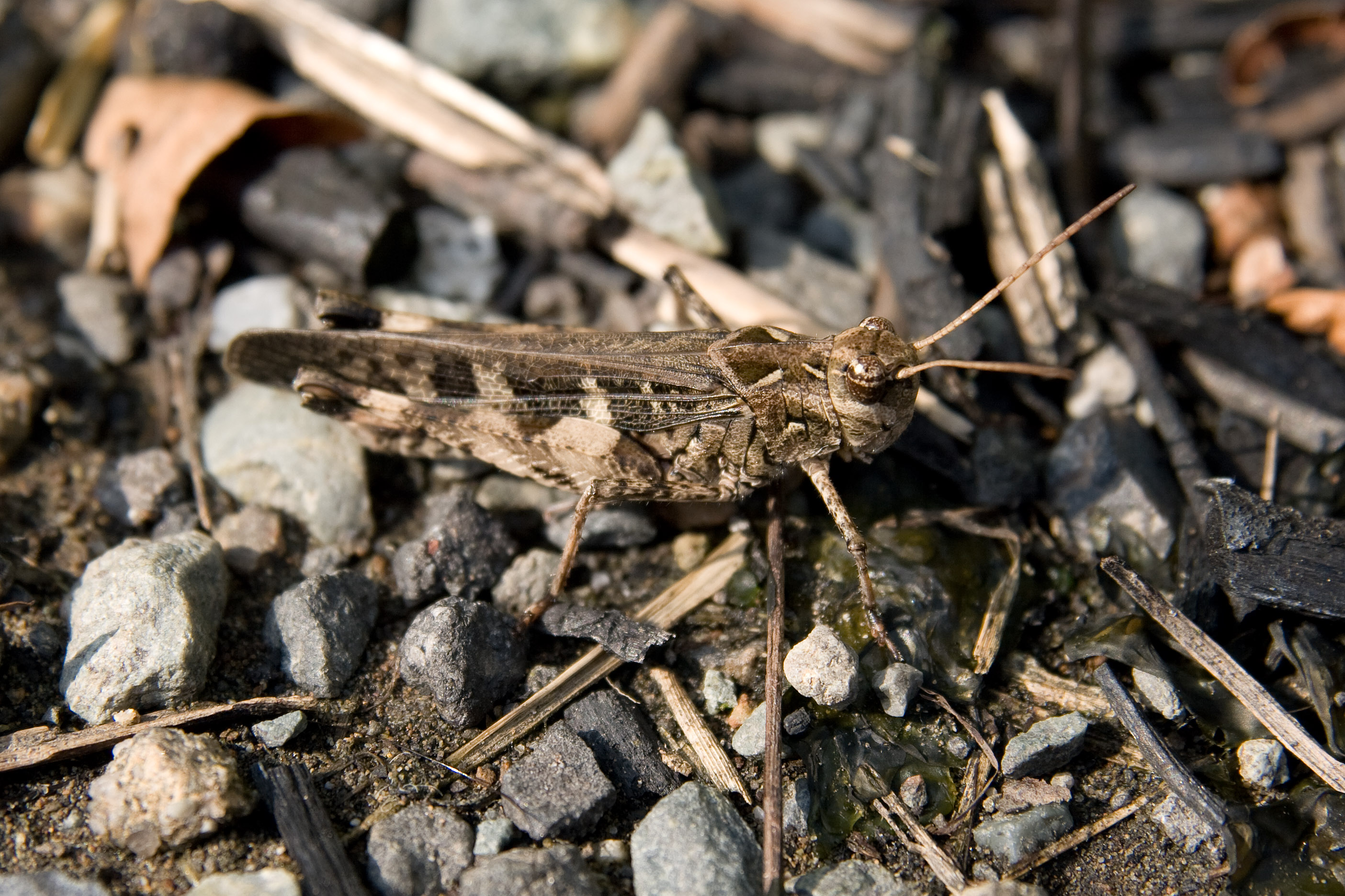
O. infernalis

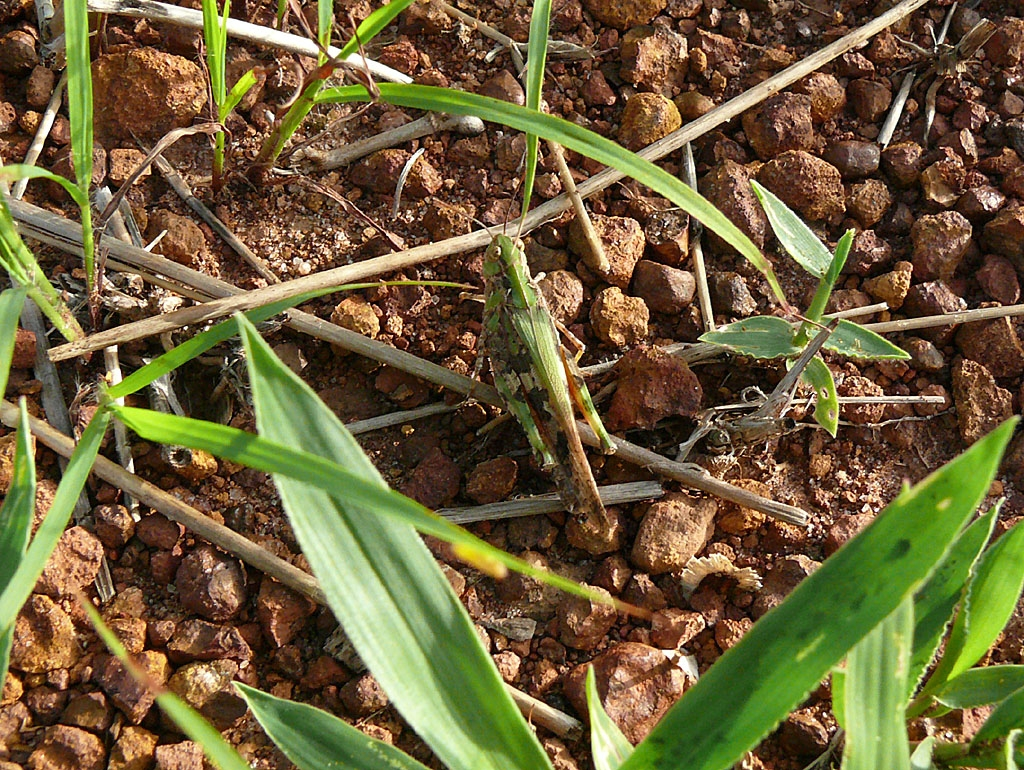
O. nigeriensis

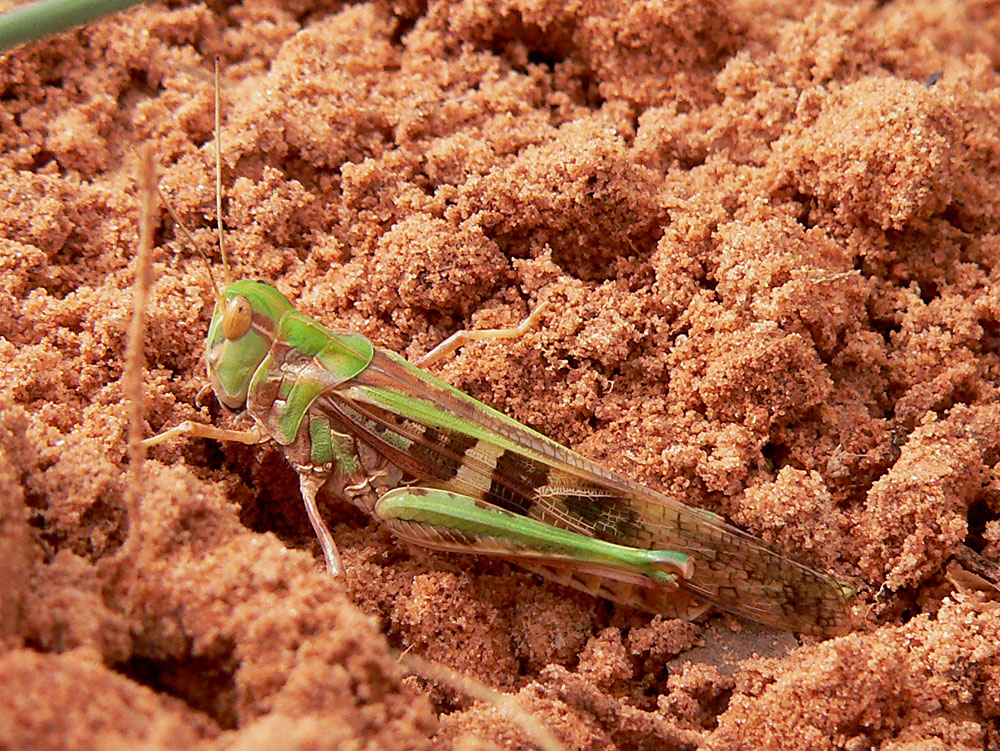
O. senegalensis (male, Niger)

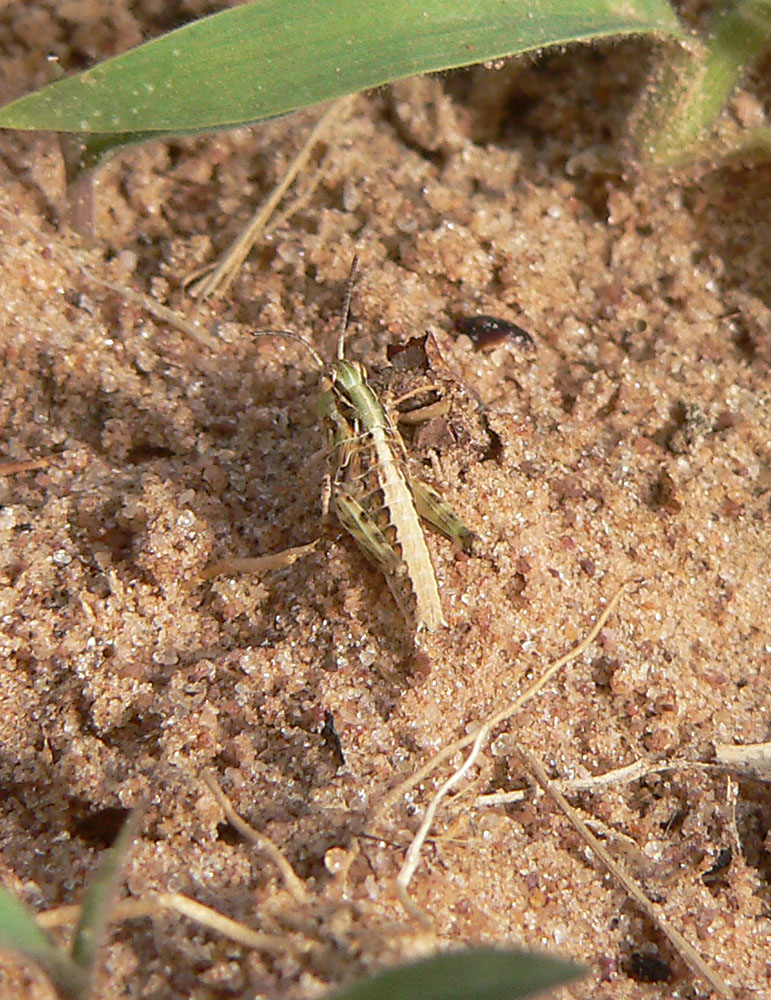
O. senegalensis nymph

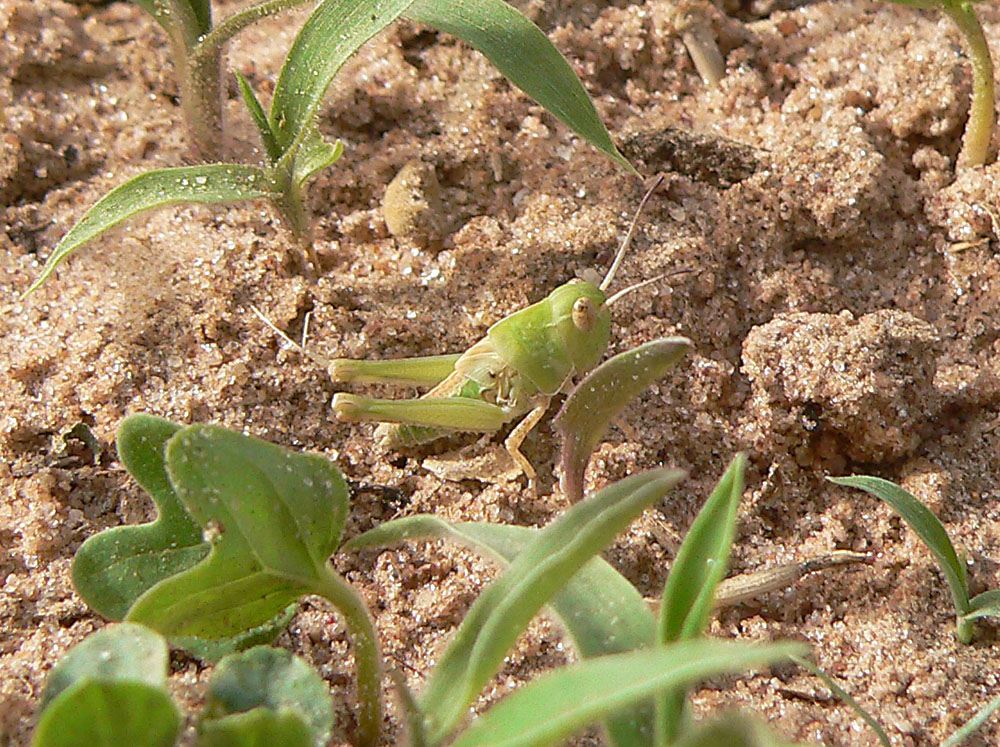

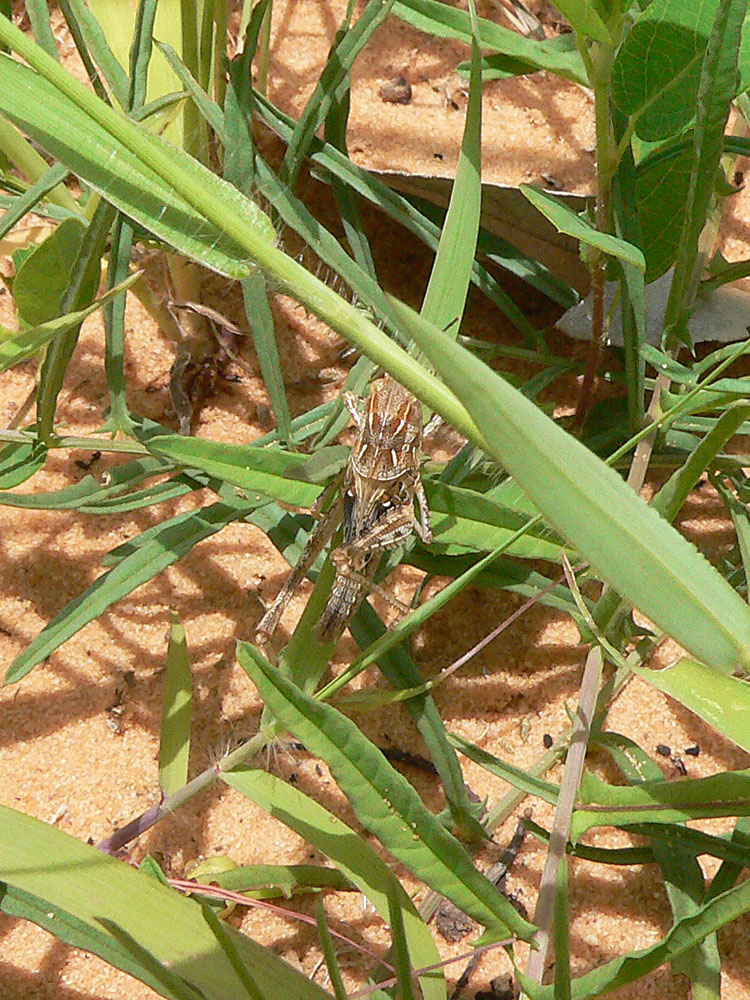
