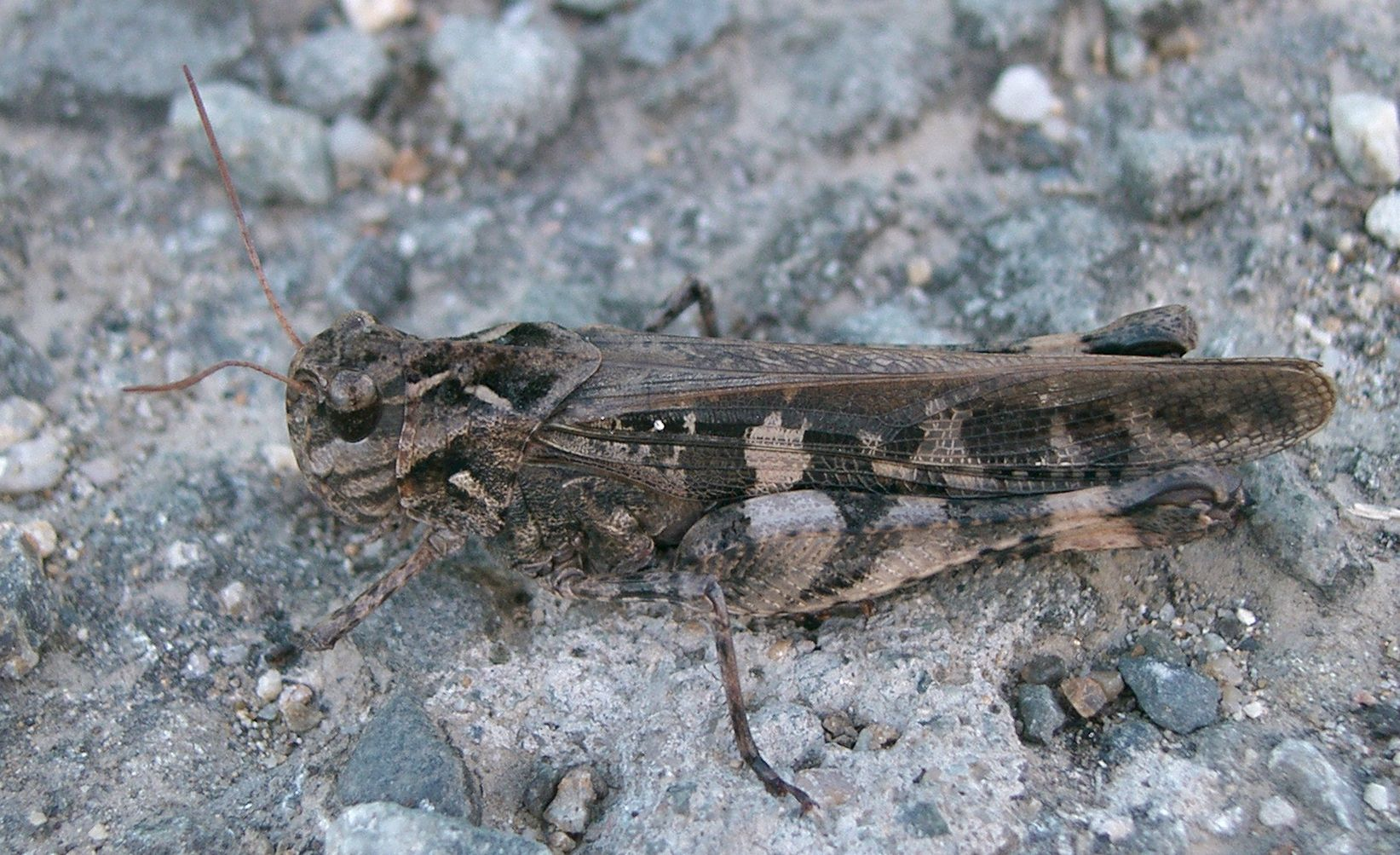
- Oedaleus infernalis, Japan

Scientific classification
- Kingdom: Animalia
- Phylum: Arthropoda
- Clade: Pancrustacea
- Class: Insecta
- Order: Orthoptera
- Suborder: Caelifera
- Family: Acrididae
- Subfamily: Oedipodinae
- Tribe: Locustini
- Genus: Oedaleus
- Species: O. infernalis

Binomial name
- Oedaleus infernalis Saussure, 1884

= Oedaleus infernalis =

Species of grasshopper

Oedaleus infernalis is a species of band-winged grasshopper in the family Acrididae. It is found in Asia and Oceania.
