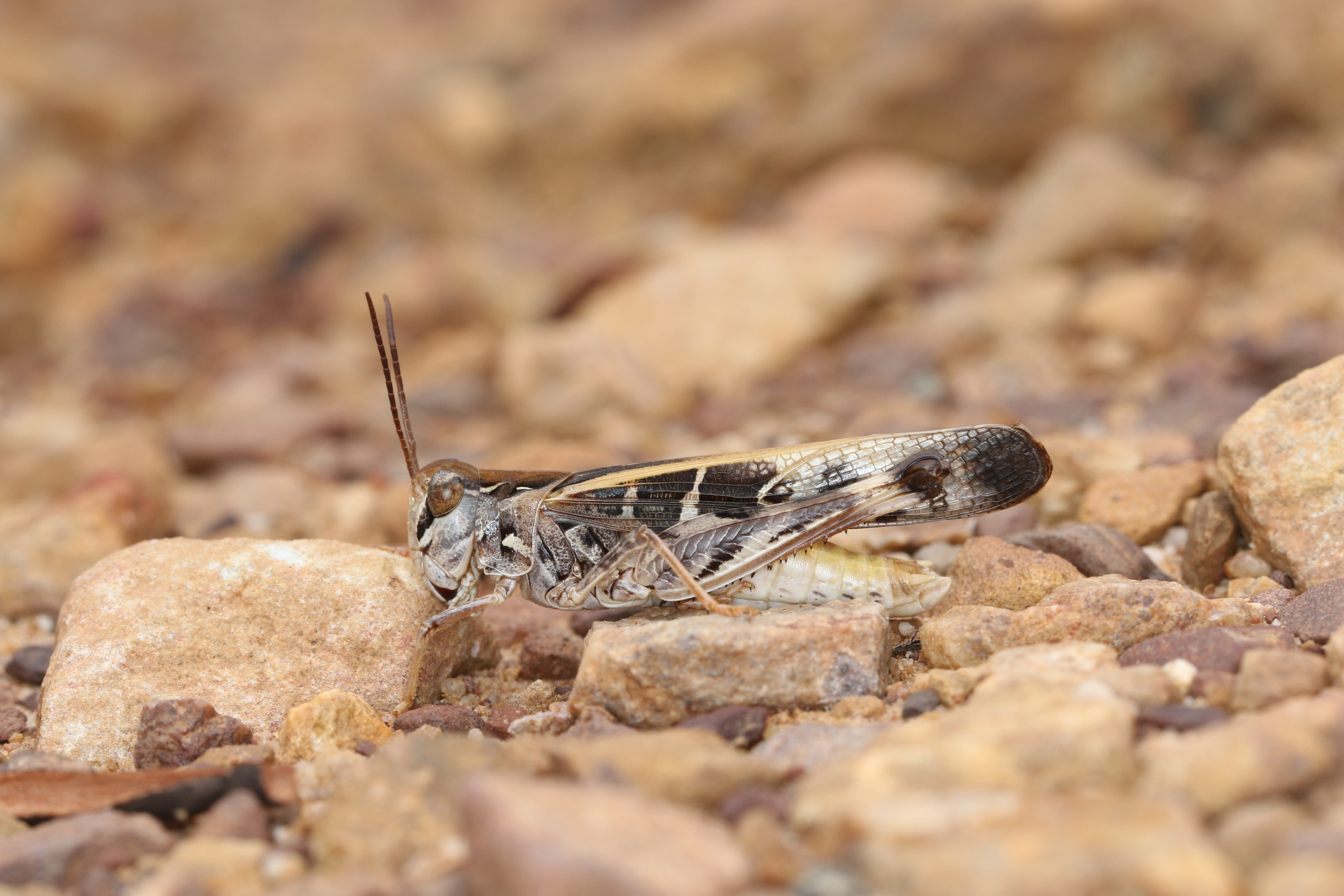
- Oedaleus australis, Eastern Oedaleus, Australia

Scientific classification
- Kingdom: Animalia
- Phylum: Arthropoda
- Clade: Pancrustacea
- Class: Insecta
- Order: Orthoptera
- Suborder: Caelifera
- Family: Acrididae
- Subfamily: Oedipodinae
- Tribe: Locustini
- Genus: Oedaleus
- Species: O. australis

Binomial name
- Oedaleus australis Saussure, 1888

= Oedaleus australis =

Species of grasshopper

Oedaleus australis, commonly called the Eastern Oedaleus, is a species of band-winged grasshopper in the family Acrididae. It is found in Australia.

== Description ==
The females are 25–35 mm long and the males are 20–30 mm long.

The color is usually brown; however, it may have some patches of green. When viewed from the side, the head is in line with the straight line of the thorax and does not rise above it. The eye seems elongated due to an elongated triangular mark that extends downward from the eye when viewed from the side. The folded forewing has large dark patches in the front half, and a subtle darker smudge at the very tip of the wing. The hind wings range from a very pale yellow to smoky yellow, with a dark tip and a dark band or smudge in the center. The thorax has a pale (almost white) 'X' mark on its top; the shanks of the hind legs are usually straw-colored. The throat peg is absent.

Significant is the dark triangle beneath the eyes and the two dark spotting on a pale yellow hind wing are both present. Furthermore, the rear tibia is not red.

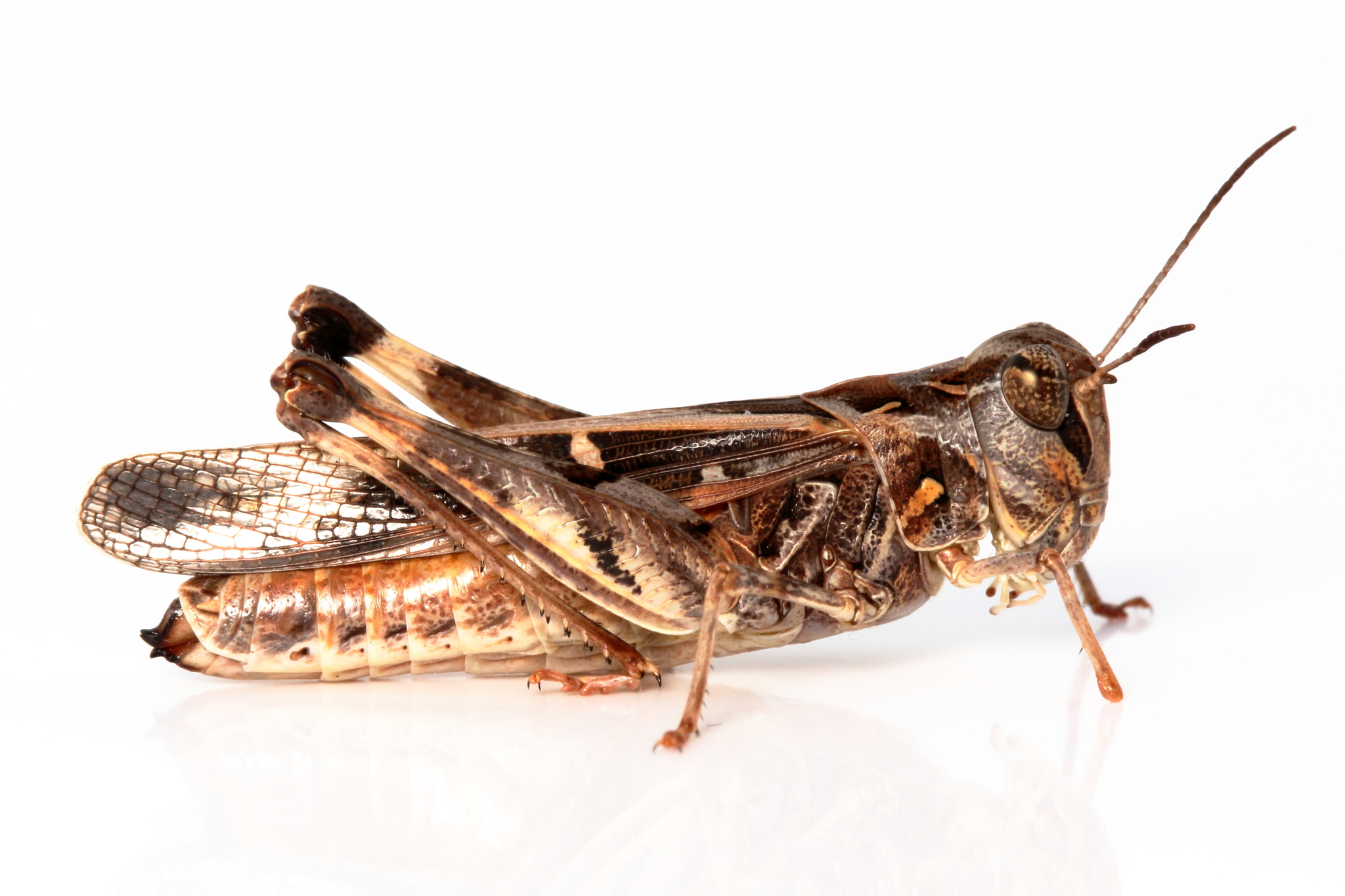
