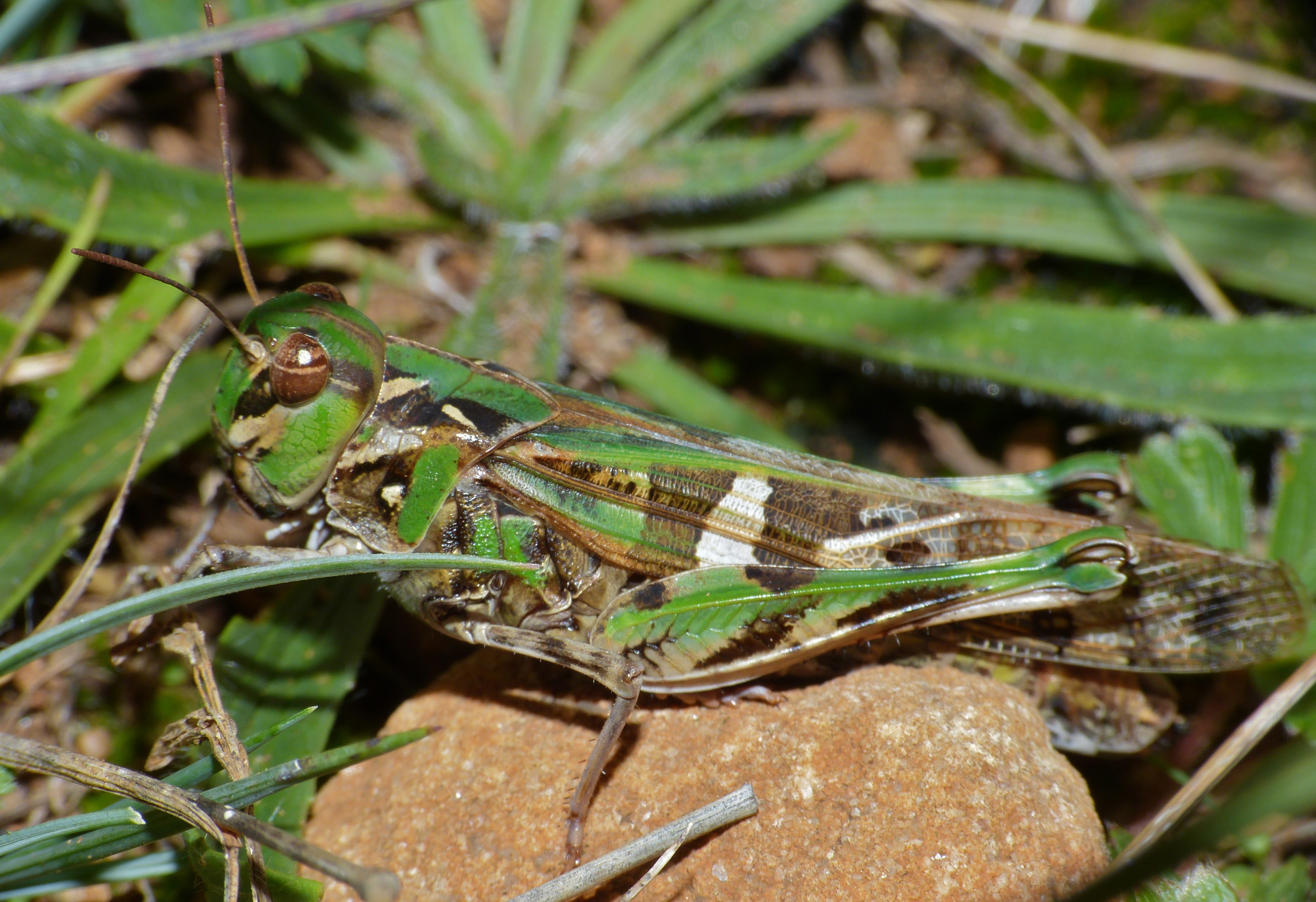
- Oedaleus decorus, France

Scientific classification
- Kingdom: Animalia
- Phylum: Arthropoda
- Clade: Pancrustacea
- Class: Insecta
- Order: Orthoptera
- Suborder: Caelifera
- Family: Acrididae
- Subfamily: Oedipodinae
- Tribe: Locustini
- Genus: Oedaleus
- Species: O. decorus

Binomial name
- Oedaleus decorus (Germar, 1825)

= Oedaleus decorus =

Species of grasshopper

Oedaleus decorus is a species of band-winged grasshopper in the subfamily Oedipodinae. It is found in the Palearctic realm.

Close-Up of a Oedaleus decorus
