= Oedaleus flavus =

Scientific classification
- Kingdom: Animalia
- Phylum: Arthropoda
- Clade: Pancrustacea
- Class: Insecta
- Order: Orthoptera
- Suborder: Caelifera
- Family: Acrididae
- Genus: Oedaleus
- Species: O. flavus

Binomial name
- Oedaleus flavus (Linnaeus, 1758)

Species of grasshopper

Oedaleus flavus is a species of insect belonging to the family Acrididae.

== Habitat ==
It is native to Eastern African countries such as Sudan, Kenya, Tanzania, Ethiopia, and Uganda. Oedaleus flavus is also native to South Africa.
