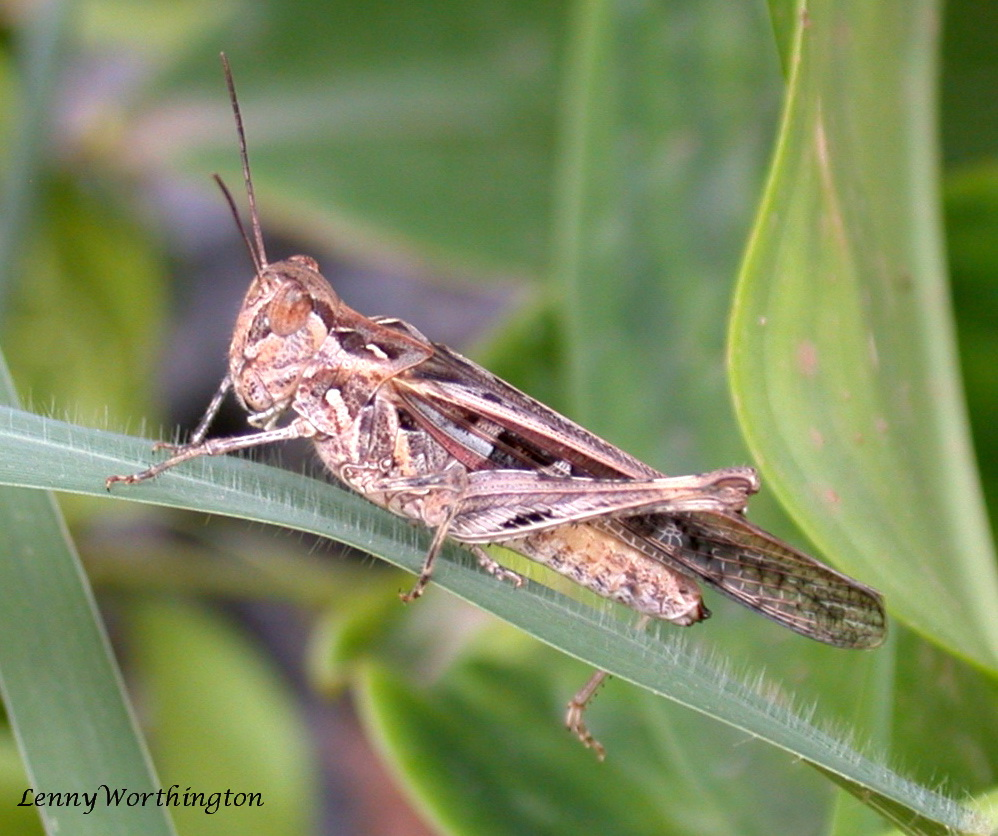
- Oedaleus abruptus, Thailand

Scientific classification
- Kingdom: Animalia
- Phylum: Arthropoda
- Clade: Pancrustacea
- Class: Insecta
- Order: Orthoptera
- Suborder: Caelifera
- Family: Acrididae
- Subfamily: Oedipodinae
- Tribe: Locustini
- Genus: Oedaleus
- Species: O. abruptus

Binomial name
- Oedaleus abruptus (Thunberg, 1815)

= Oedaleus abruptus =

Species of band-winged grasshopper

Oedaleus abruptus is a species of band-winged grasshopper in the family Acrididae. It is found in Indomalaya and eastern Asia.
