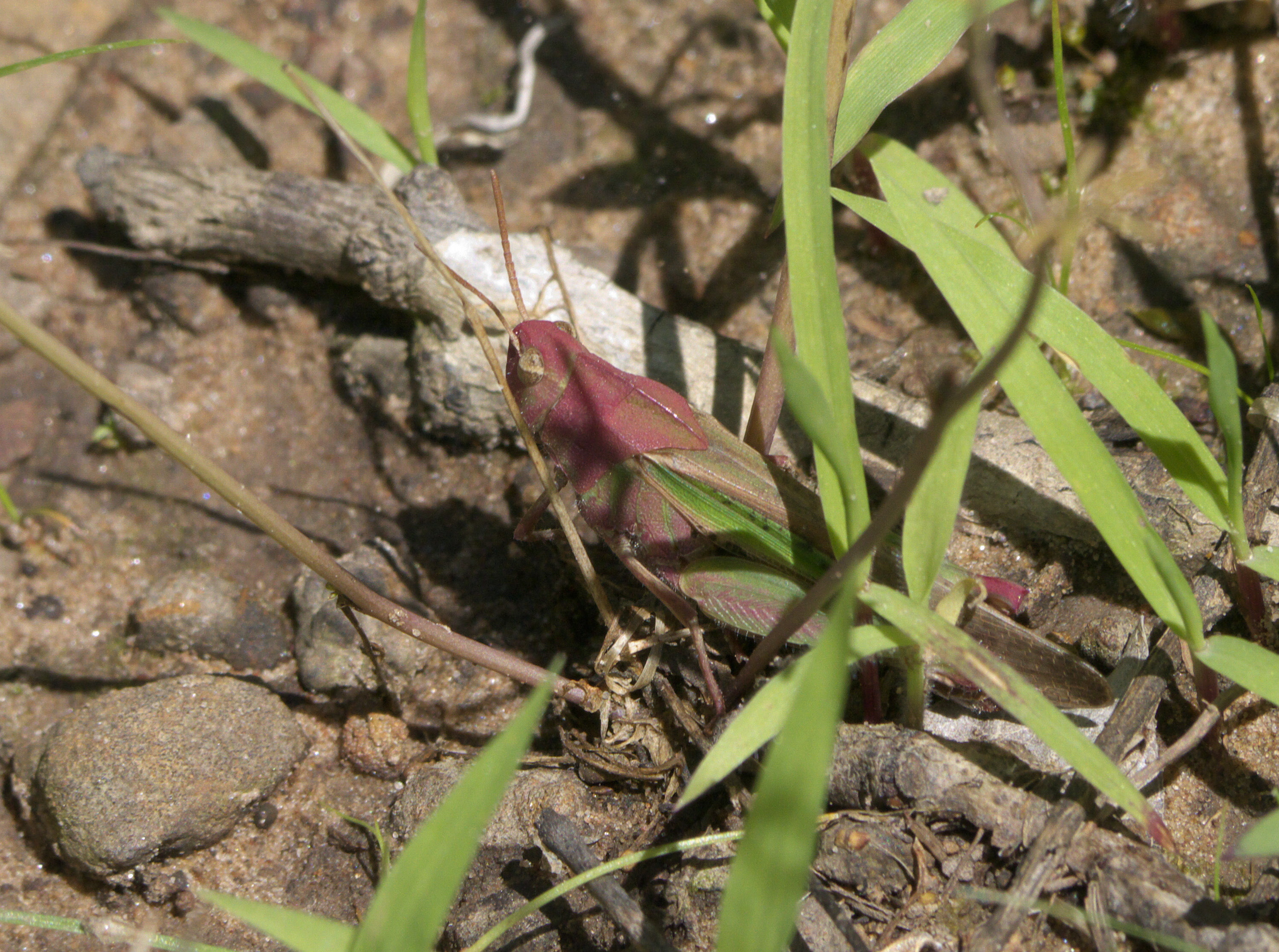

Conservation status
- Secure (NatureServe)

Scientific classification
- Kingdom: Animalia
- Phylum: Arthropoda
- Class: Insecta
- Order: Orthoptera
- Suborder: Caelifera
- Family: Acrididae
- Genus: Chortophaga
- Species: C. viridifasciata

Binomial name
- Chortophaga viridifasciata (De Geer, 1773)

= Chortophaga viridifasciata =

Species of grasshopper

Chortophaga viridifasciata, the green-striped grasshopper, is a species of band-winged grasshopper in the family Acrididae.

== Range and habitat ==
It is found in Central America and North America, ranging from British Columbia to the Gulf of Mexico (mostly east of the Rocky Mountains), south to Costa Rica.

Green-striped grasshoppers inhabit relatively moist areas of short grass, such as roadsides and hay meadows.

== Life-cycle ==
The green-striped grasshopper is single-brooded in the North and west of the Great Plains but is multiple-brooded in the Southeast.

In the single-brooded range, green-striped grasshoppers' eggs are laid early in the summer season. These eggs hatch later in the same summer. The nymphs will molt three to four times before winter. The nymphs survive through the winter and then molt one or two more times to reach adulthood. C. viridifasciata is often the first grasshopper to appear in early spring because of its overwintering.

Green-striped grasshoppers typically have five instars during development.

== Description ==
Their size ranges from 23 to 30 mm for males and 28 to 38 mm for females. Females are typically green and males are typically brown but there is variation for both.

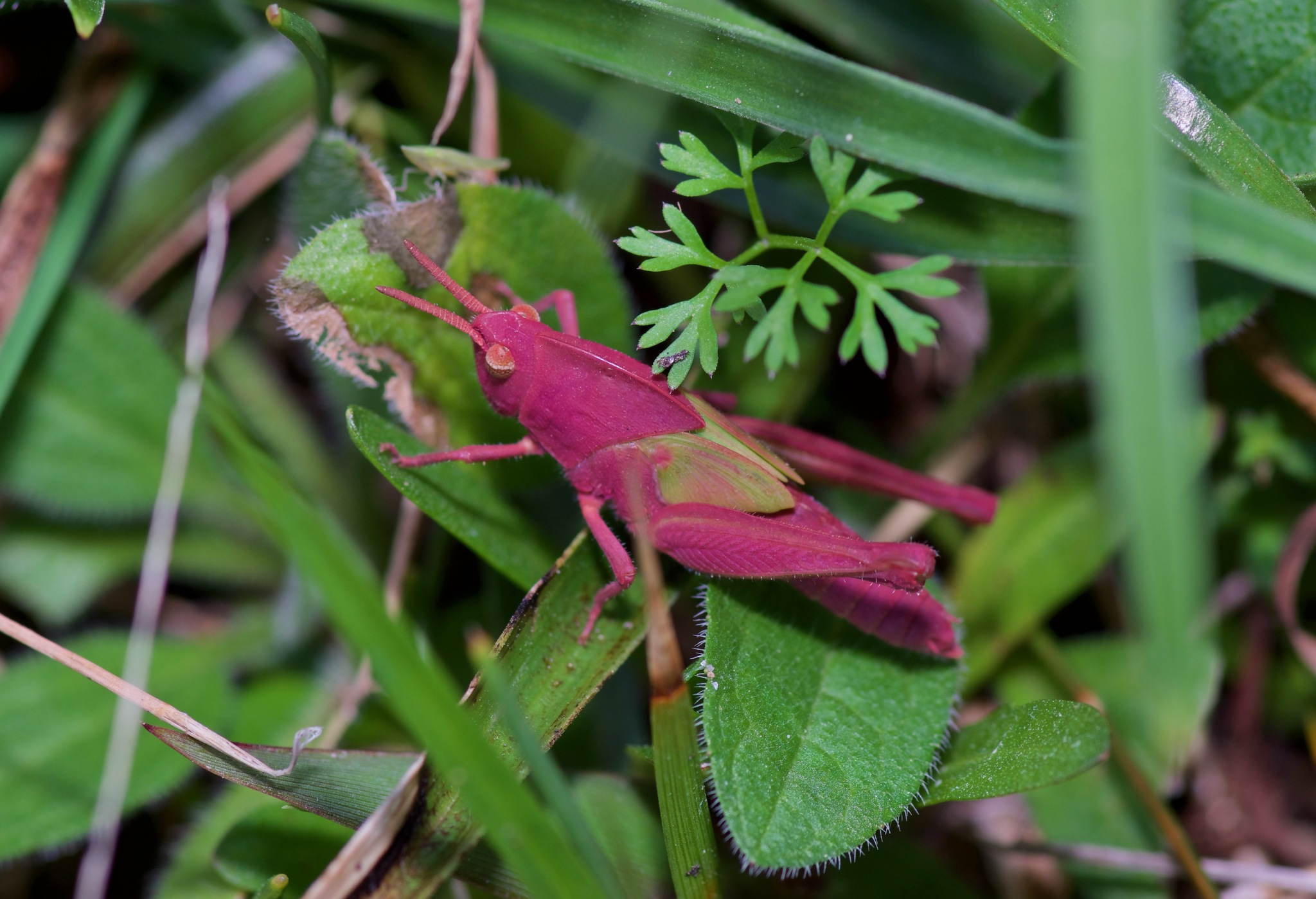
Erythristic, Texas

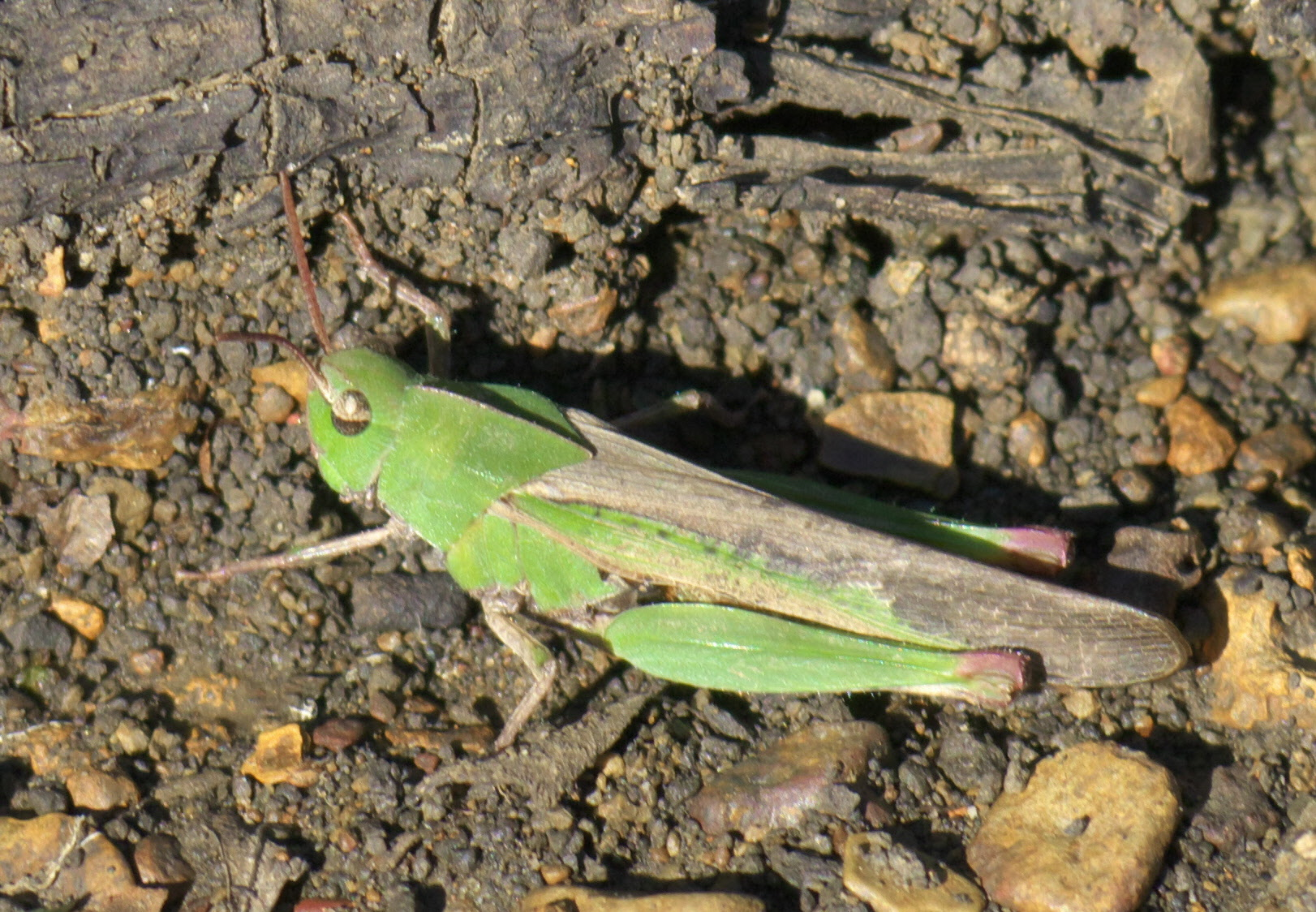
In Oklahoma

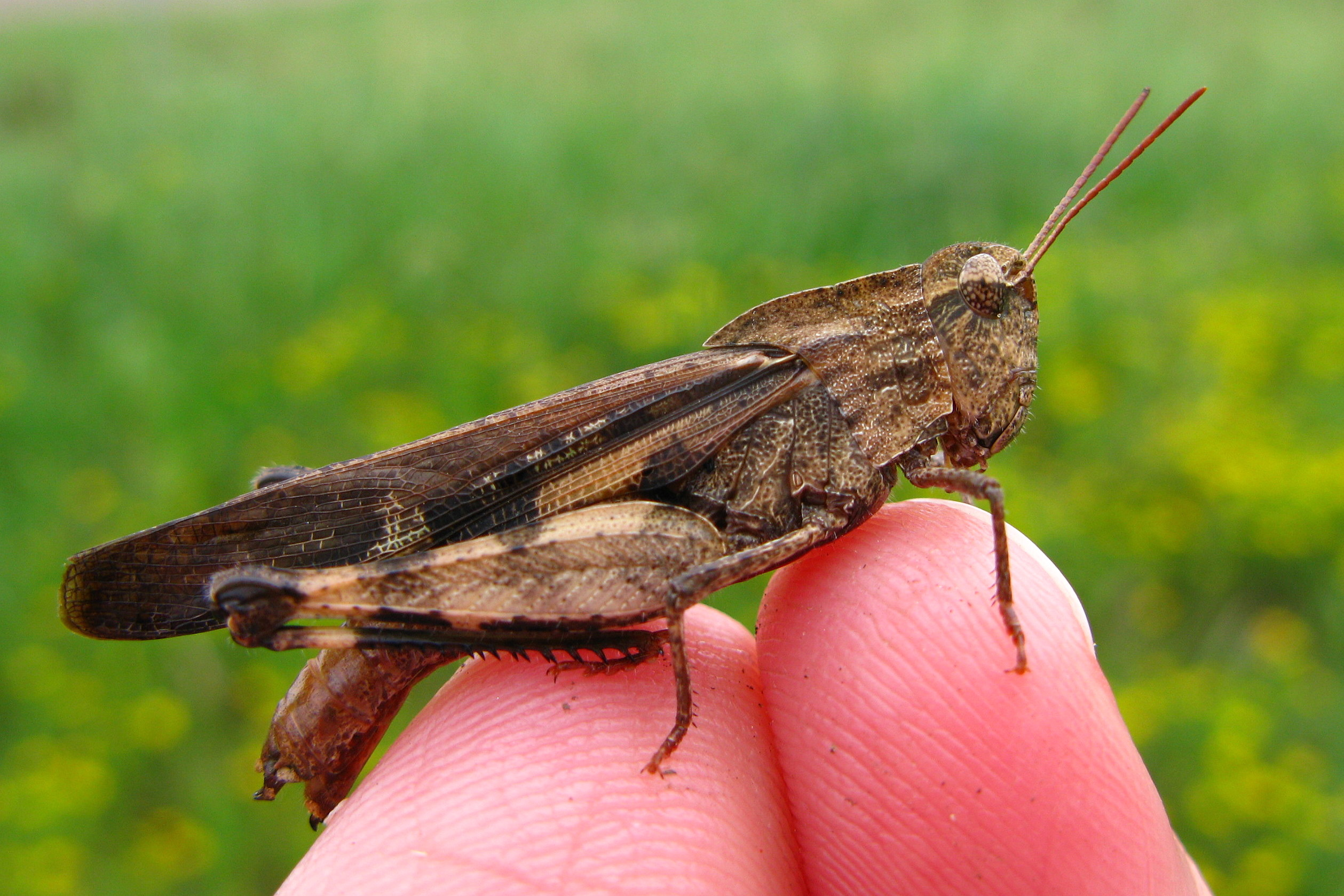
Female

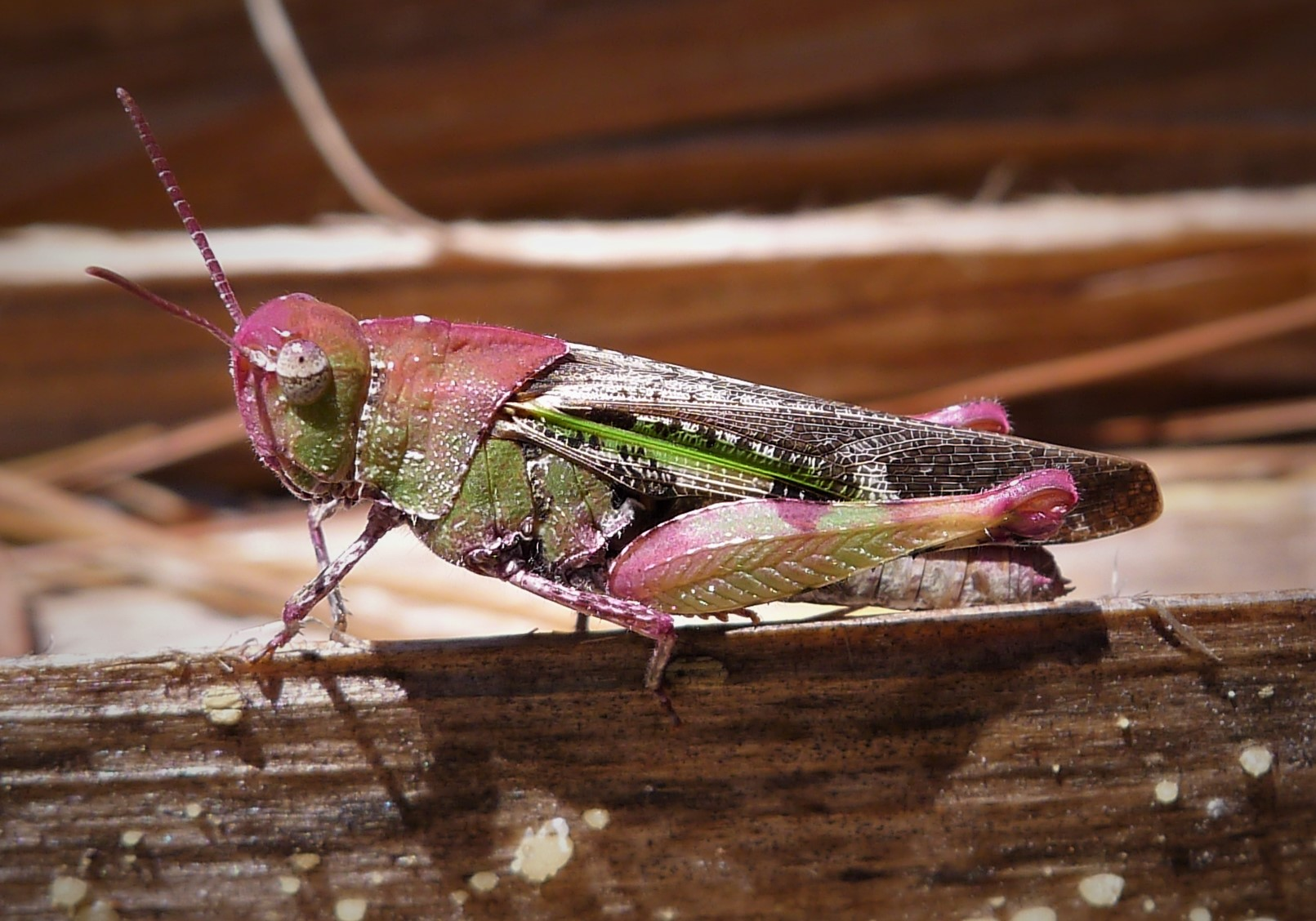
C. v. australior female in Georgia, Okeefenokee Swamp

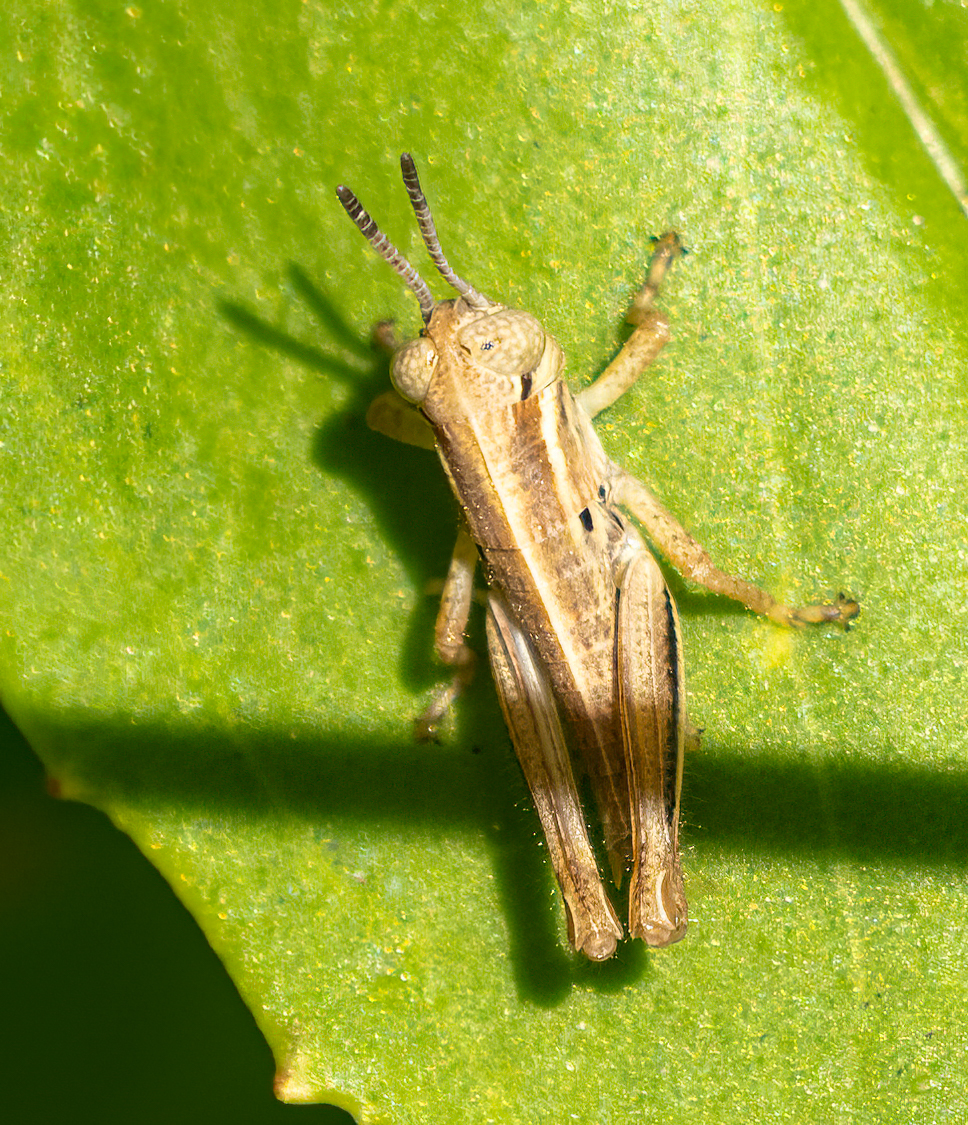
Nymph in New York

== Subspecies ==
These two subspecies belong to the species Chortophaga viridifasciata:

Image	Species	Common name
	Chortophaga viridifasciata viridifasciata^{b}	Northern green-striped grasshopper
	Chortophaga viridifasciata australior^{b}	Southern green-striped grasshopper

Data sources: i = ITIS, c = Catalogue of Life, g = GBIF, b = Bugguide.net

The subspecies Chortophaga viridifasciata australior is sometimes listed as a separate species, but it intergrades northward with subspecies viridifasciata, making species level distinction unlikely.
