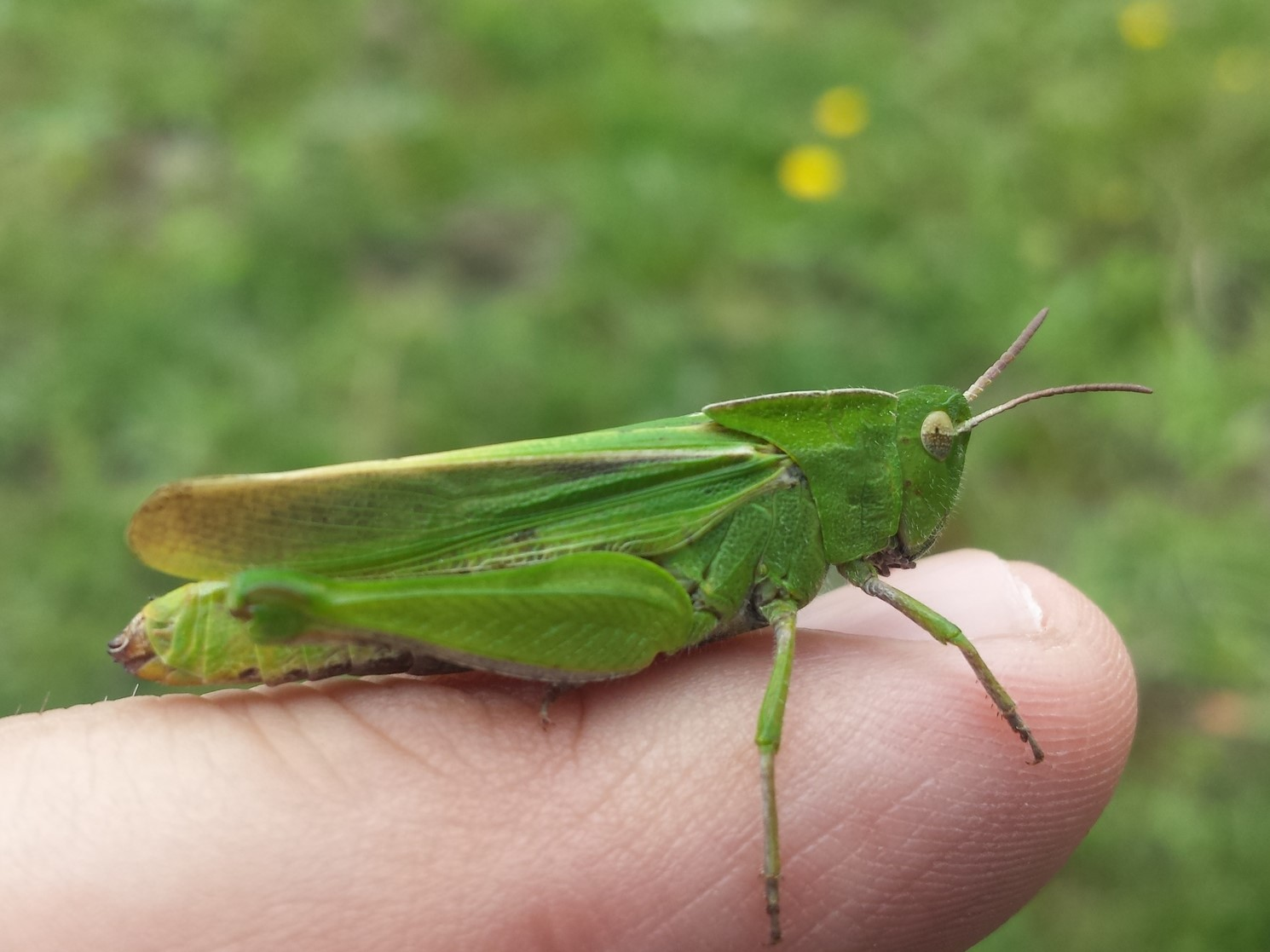

Conservation status
- Apparently Secure (NatureServe)

Scientific classification
- Kingdom: Animalia
- Phylum: Arthropoda
- Class: Insecta
- Order: Orthoptera
- Suborder: Caelifera
- Family: Acrididae
- Tribe: Chortophagini
- Genus: Chortophaga
- Species: C. mendocino

Binomial name
- Chortophaga mendocino Rentz, 1977

= Chortophaga mendocino =

Species of grasshopper

Chortophaga mendocino, the Mendocino green-striped grasshopper, is a species of band-winged grasshopper in the family Acrididae. It is found in North America.
