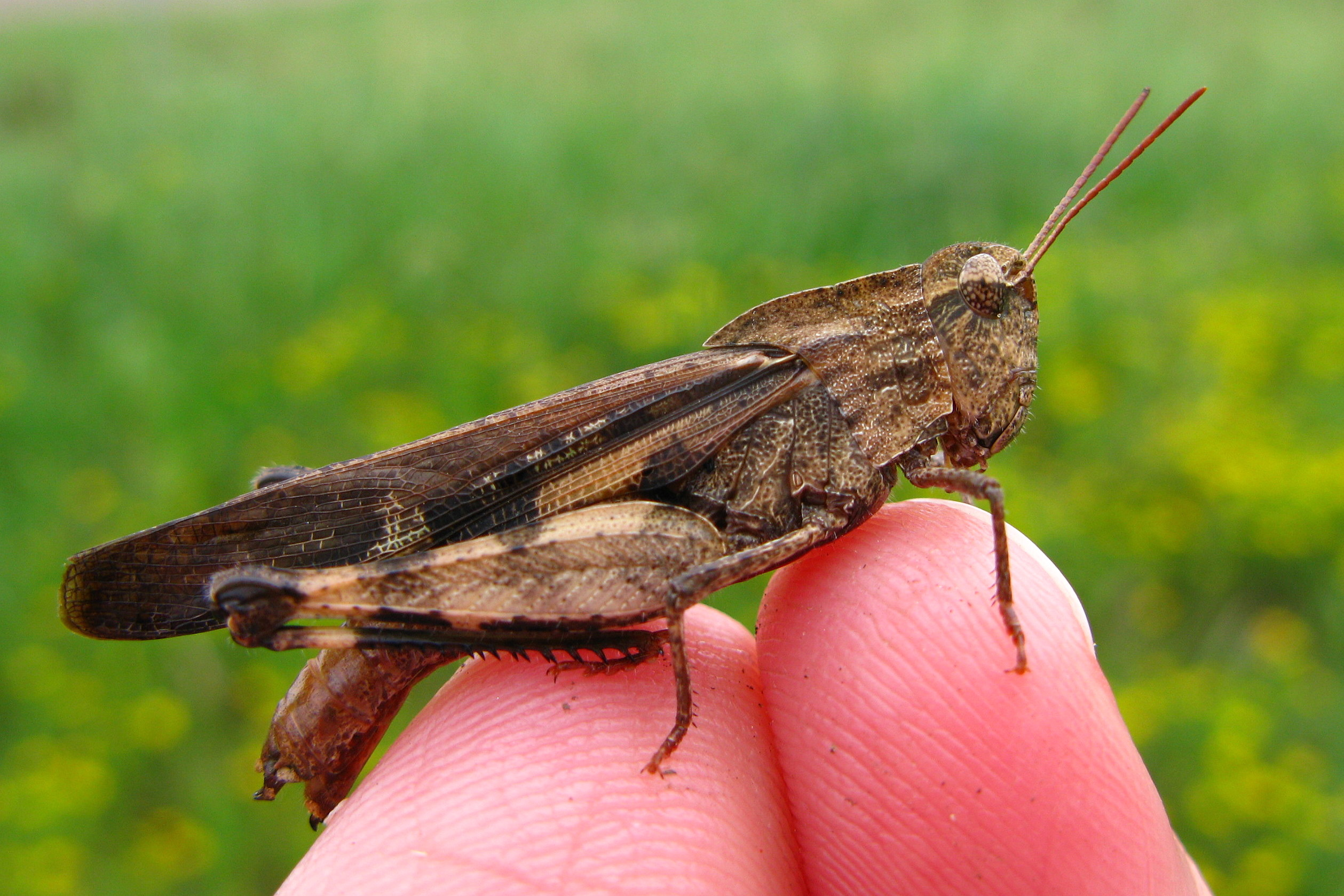
- Chortophaga viridifasciata

Scientific classification
- Kingdom: Animalia
- Phylum: Arthropoda
- Clade: Pancrustacea
- Class: Insecta
- Order: Orthoptera
- Suborder: Caelifera
- Family: Acrididae
- Subfamily: Oedipodinae
- Tribe: Chortophagini
- Genus: Chortophaga (Harris, 1841)

Synonyms
- Tragocephala Harris, 1841

= Chortophaga =

Genus of grasshoppers

Chortophaga is a genus of North American "band-winged grasshoppers" of the family Acrididae.

== Species ==
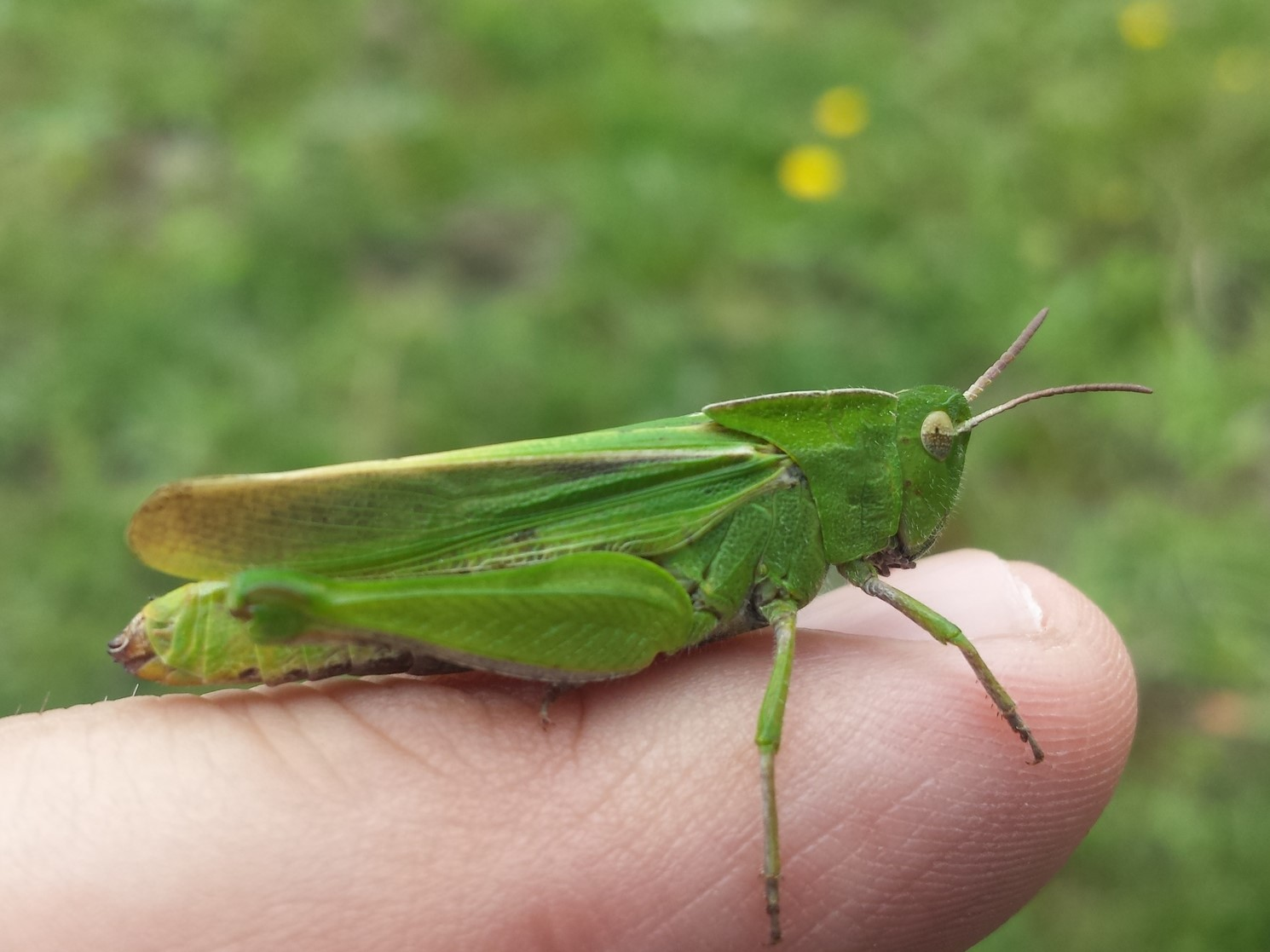
Chortophaga mendocino

Listed alphabetically.

1. Chortophaga australior Rehn & Hebard, 1911 – southern green-striped grasshopper (sometimes listed as a subspecies of C. viridifasciata)
2. Chortophaga cubensis (Scudder, 1875)
3. Chortophaga mendocino Rentz, 1977 – Mendocino green-striped grasshopper
4. Chortophaga viridifasciata (De Geer, 1773) – northern green-striped grasshopper
