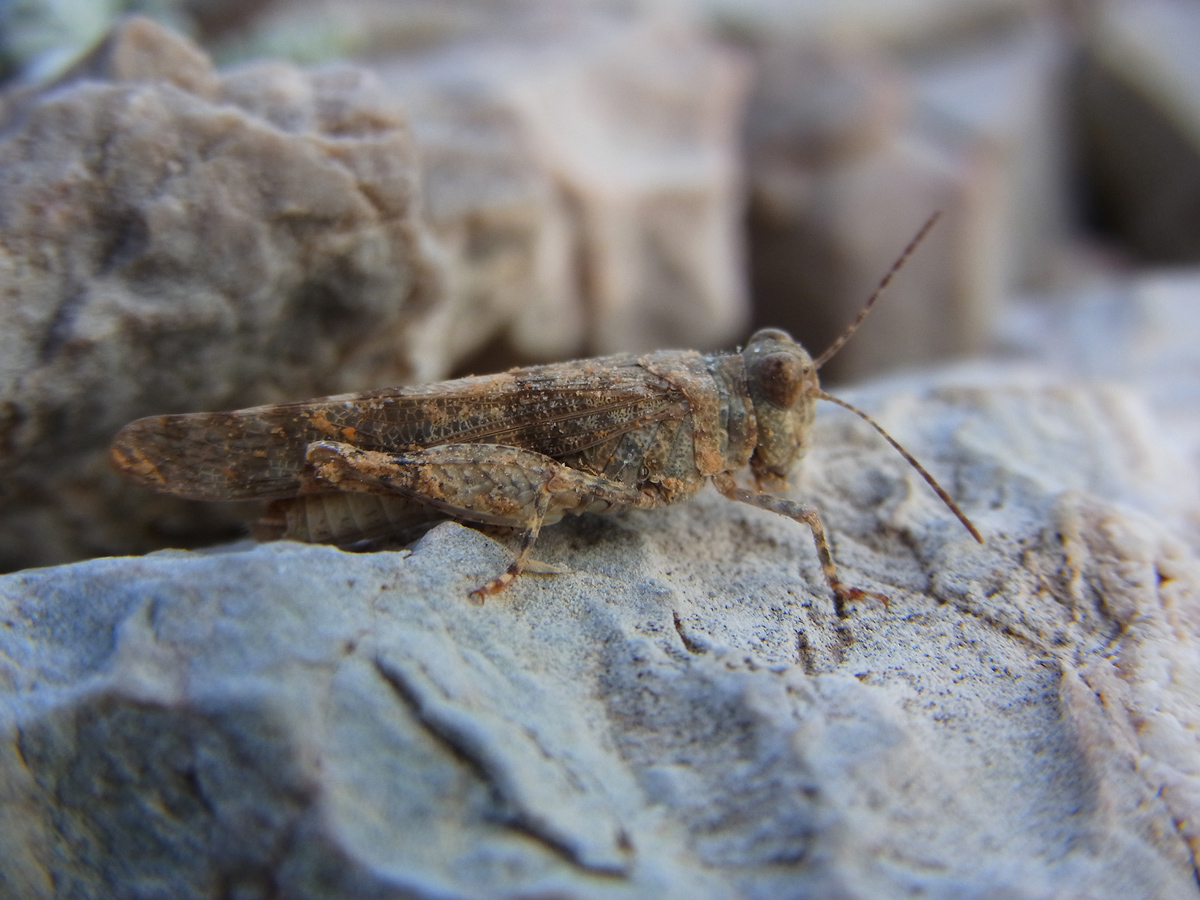
- Acrotylus patruelis

Scientific classification
- Kingdom: Animalia
- Phylum: Arthropoda
- Class: Insecta
- Order: Orthoptera
- Suborder: Caelifera
- Family: Acrididae
- Subfamily: Oedipodinae
- Tribe: Acrotylini
- Genus: Acrotylus; Fieber, 1853

Species
- See text

= Acrotylus =

Genus of grasshoppers

Acrotylus is a genus of grasshopper in the family Acrididae and the type genus of the tribe Acrotylini.

== Species ==
Acrotylus containing the following species:

- Acrotylus aberrans Bruner, 1910 - Madagascar
- Acrotylus angulatus Stål, 1876
- Acrotylus apicalis Bolívar, 1908
- Acrotylus apricarius Stål, 1873
- Acrotylus azureus Uvarov, 1929
- Acrotylus bicornis Sjöstedt, 1918
- Acrotylus bilobatus Miller, 1932
- Acrotylus blondeli Saussure, 1884 Sahel through to Yemen; southeast Africa
- Acrotylus braudi Defaut, 2005
- Acrotylus cabaceira Brancsik, 1893
- Acrotylus capitatus Kirby, 1902
- Acrotylus concinnus Serville, 1838
- Acrotylus crassiceps Uvarov, 1953
- Acrotylus crassus Saussure, 1884
- Acrotylus daveyi Mason, 1959
- Acrotylus deustus Thunberg, 1815
- Acrotylus diana Karny, 1910
- Acrotylus elgonensis Sjöstedt, 1933
- Acrotylus errabundus Finot, 1893
- Acrotylus fischeri Azam, 1901
- Acrotylus flavescens Stål, 1873
- Acrotylus fulgens Uvarov, 1953
- Acrotylus furcifer Saussure, 1888
- Acrotylus gracilis La Greca, 1991
- Acrotylus hirtus Dirsh, 1956
- Acrotylus hottentotus Saussure, 1884
- Acrotylus humbertianus Saussure, 1884 - India
- Acrotylus incarnatus Krauss, 1907
- Acrotylus innotatus Uvarov, 1933
- Acrotylus inornatus Kuthy, 1905
- Acrotylus insubricus Scopoli, 1786
- Acrotylus johnstoni Kirby, 1902
- Acrotylus junodi Schulthess Schindler, 1899
- Acrotylus kirbyi Froggatt, 1903
- Acrotylus knipperi Kevan, 1961
- Acrotylus longipes Charpentier, 1845
- Acrotylus meruensis Sjöstedt, 1932
- Acrotylus mossambicus Brancsik, 1893
- Acrotylus multispinosus Brancsik, 1893 - Madagascar
- Acrotylus ndoloi Kevan, 1956
- Acrotylus nigripennis Uvarov, 1922
- Acrotylus ocellatus Brancsik, 1893
- Acrotylus patruelis Herrich-Schäffer, 1838
- Acrotylus ponomarenkoi Storozhenko, 1992 - Vietnam
- Acrotylus somaliensis Johnsen & Schmidt, 1982
- Acrotylus trifasciatus Kevan, 1961
- Acrotylus trigrammus Bolívar, 1912
