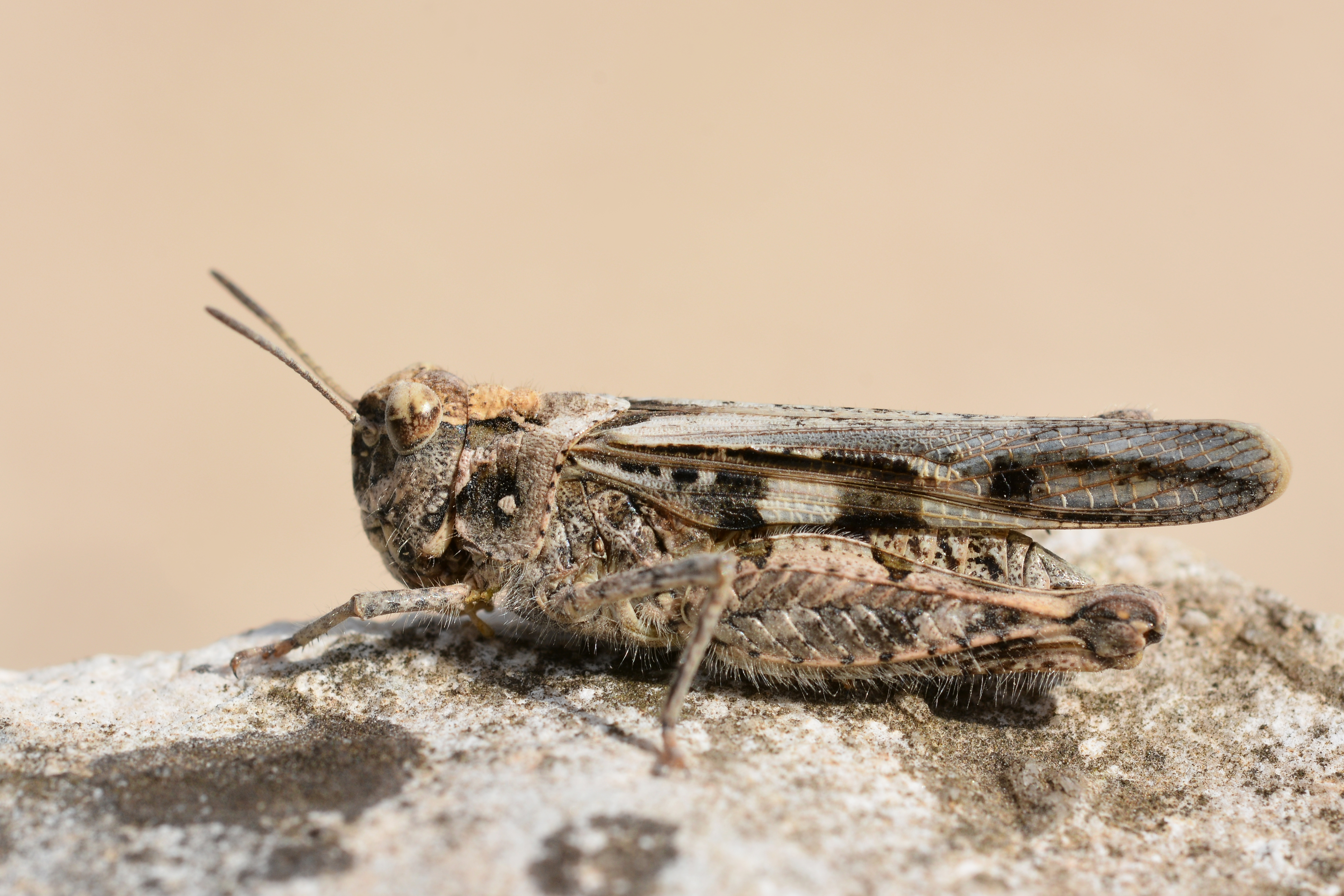
- Acrotylus fischeri, France

Conservation status
- Least Concern (IUCN 3.1)

Scientific classification
- Kingdom: Animalia
- Phylum: Arthropoda
- Clade: Pancrustacea
- Class: Insecta
- Order: Orthoptera
- Suborder: Caelifera
- Family: Acrididae
- Subfamily: Oedipodinae
- Tribe: Acrotylini
- Genus: Acrotylus
- Species: A. fischeri

Binomial name
- Acrotylus fischeri Azam, 1901

= Acrotylus fischeri =

Species of grasshopper

Acrotylus fischeri is a species of band-winged grasshopper in the family Acrididae. It is found in southern Europe and northern Africa.
