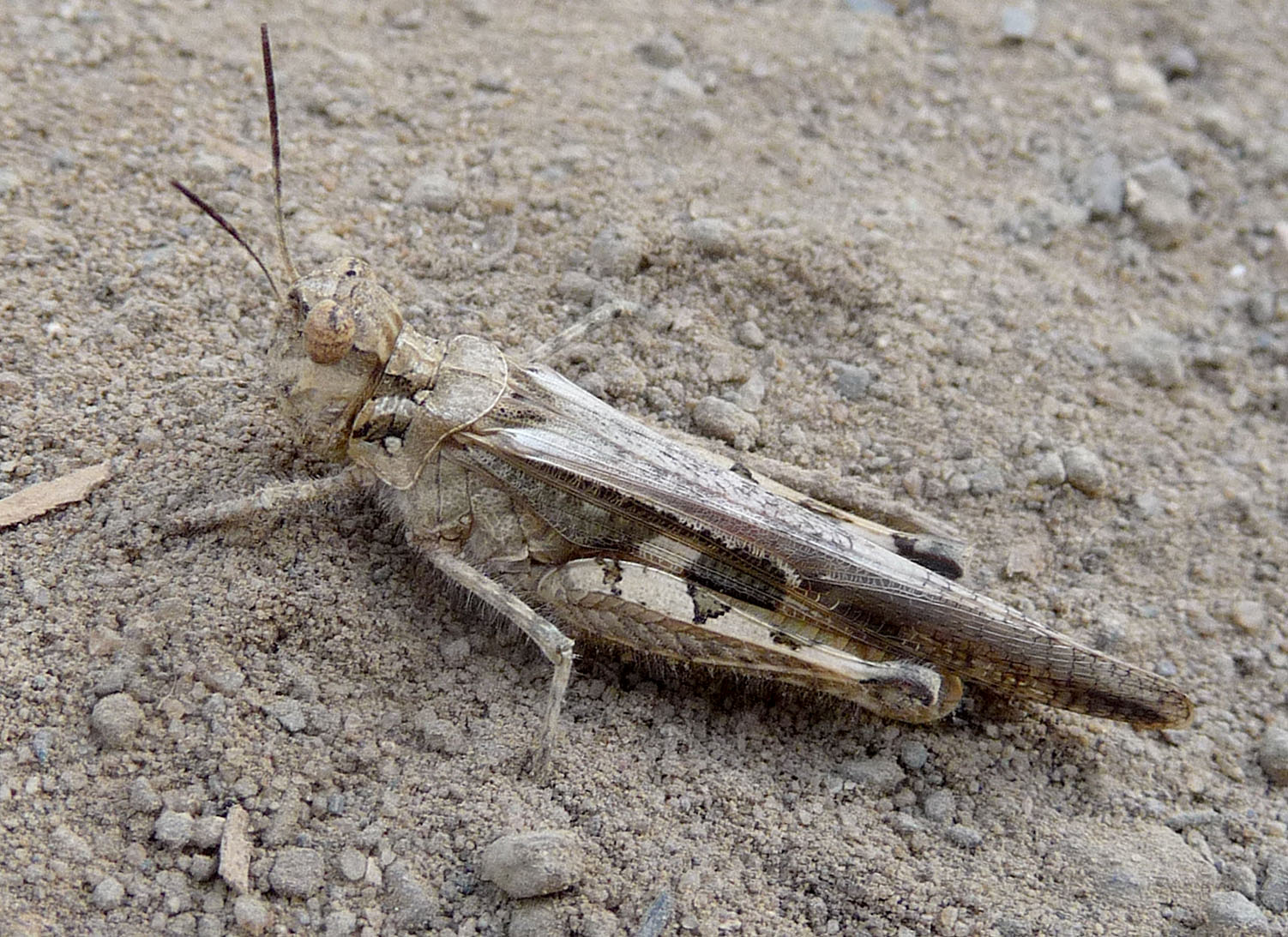
- Acrotylus longipes

Scientific classification
- Kingdom: Animalia
- Phylum: Arthropoda
- Class: Insecta
- Order: Orthoptera
- Suborder: Caelifera
- Family: Acrididae
- Subfamily: Oedipodinae
- Tribe: Acrotylini
- Genus: Acrotylus
- Species: A. longipes

Binomial name
- Acrotylus longipes (Charpentier, 1845)
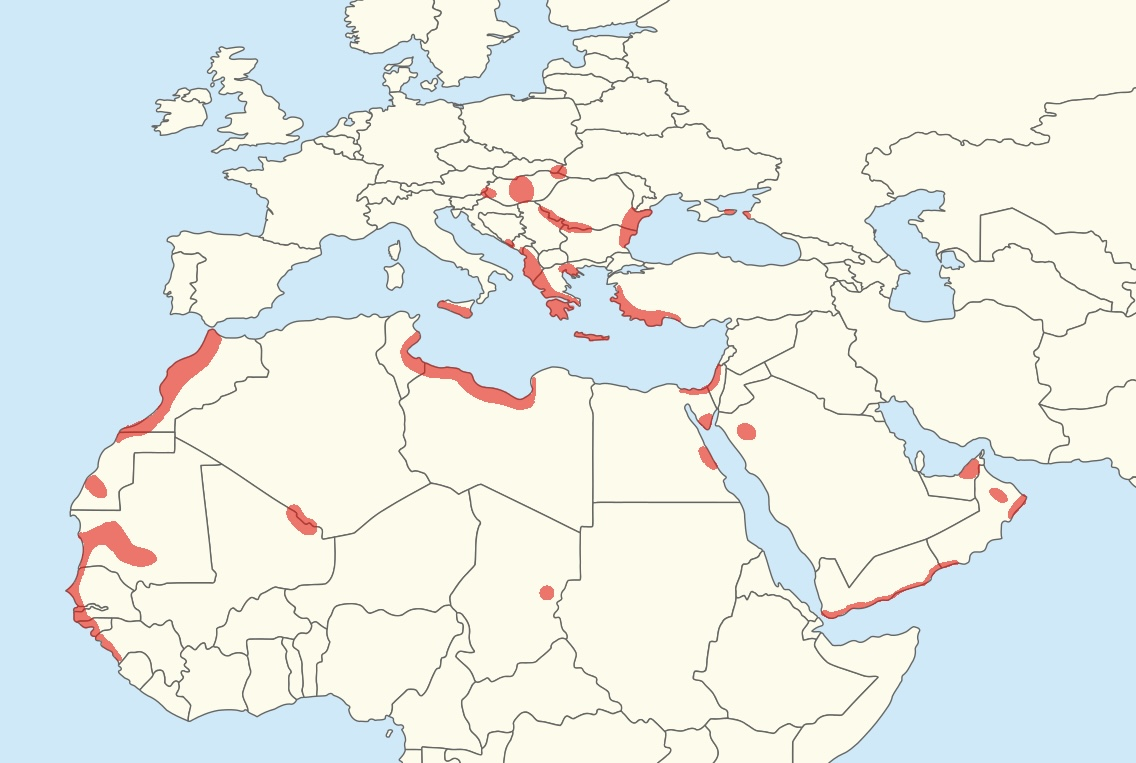
- Records Map (it is also present in Canary Islands, Aegean Islands and Cape Verde)

= Acrotylus longipes =

Species of band-winged grasshopper

Acrotylus longipes is a species of band-winged grasshopper in the family Acrididae. It is found in Europe, North Africa, and western Asia.

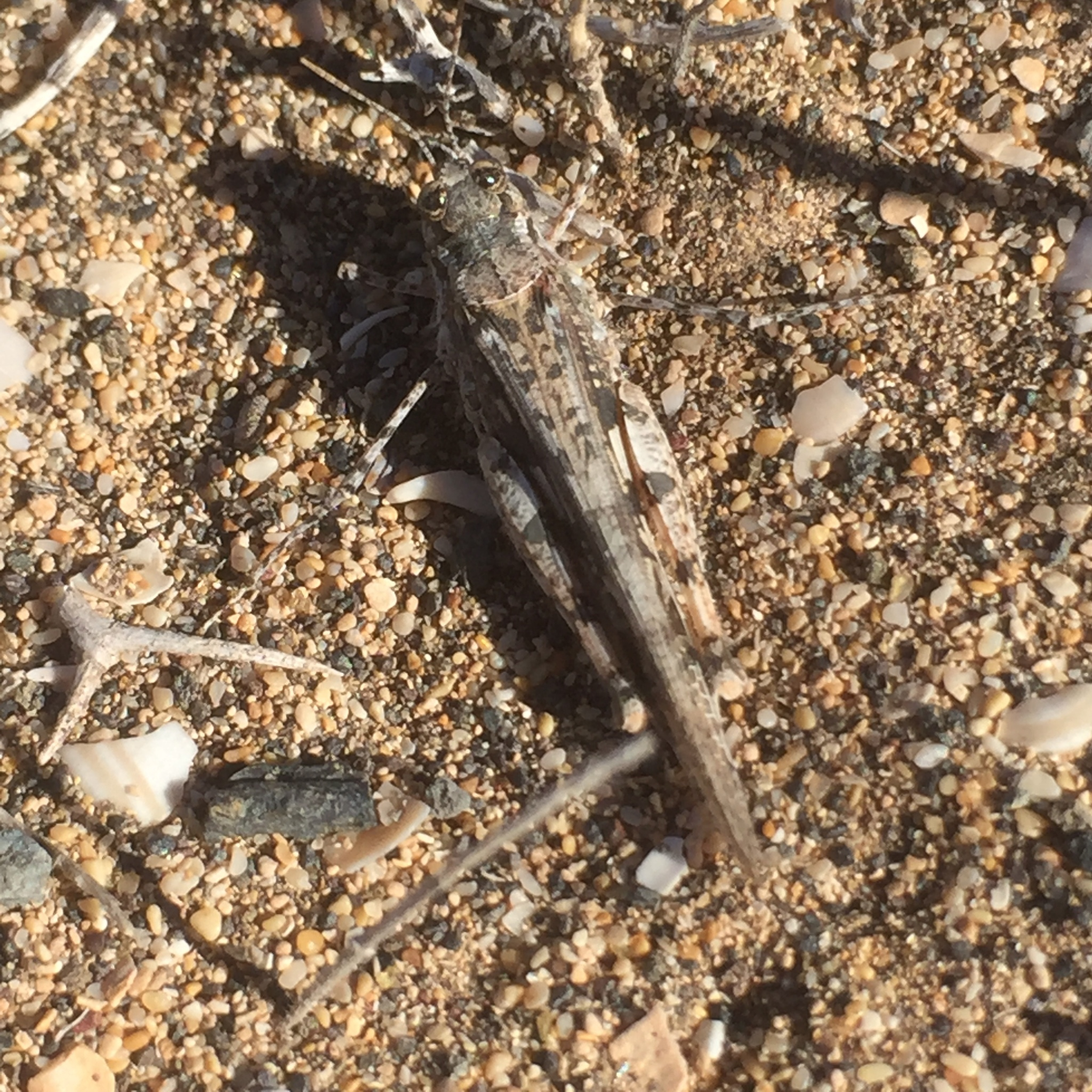
Acrotylus longipes, España

== Subspecies ==
These three subspecies belong to the species Acrotylus longipes:

- Acrotylus longipes longipes (Charpentier, 1845)
- Acrotylus longipes rosea Bolívar, 1908
- Acrotylus longipes subfasciatus Bey-Bienko, 1948
