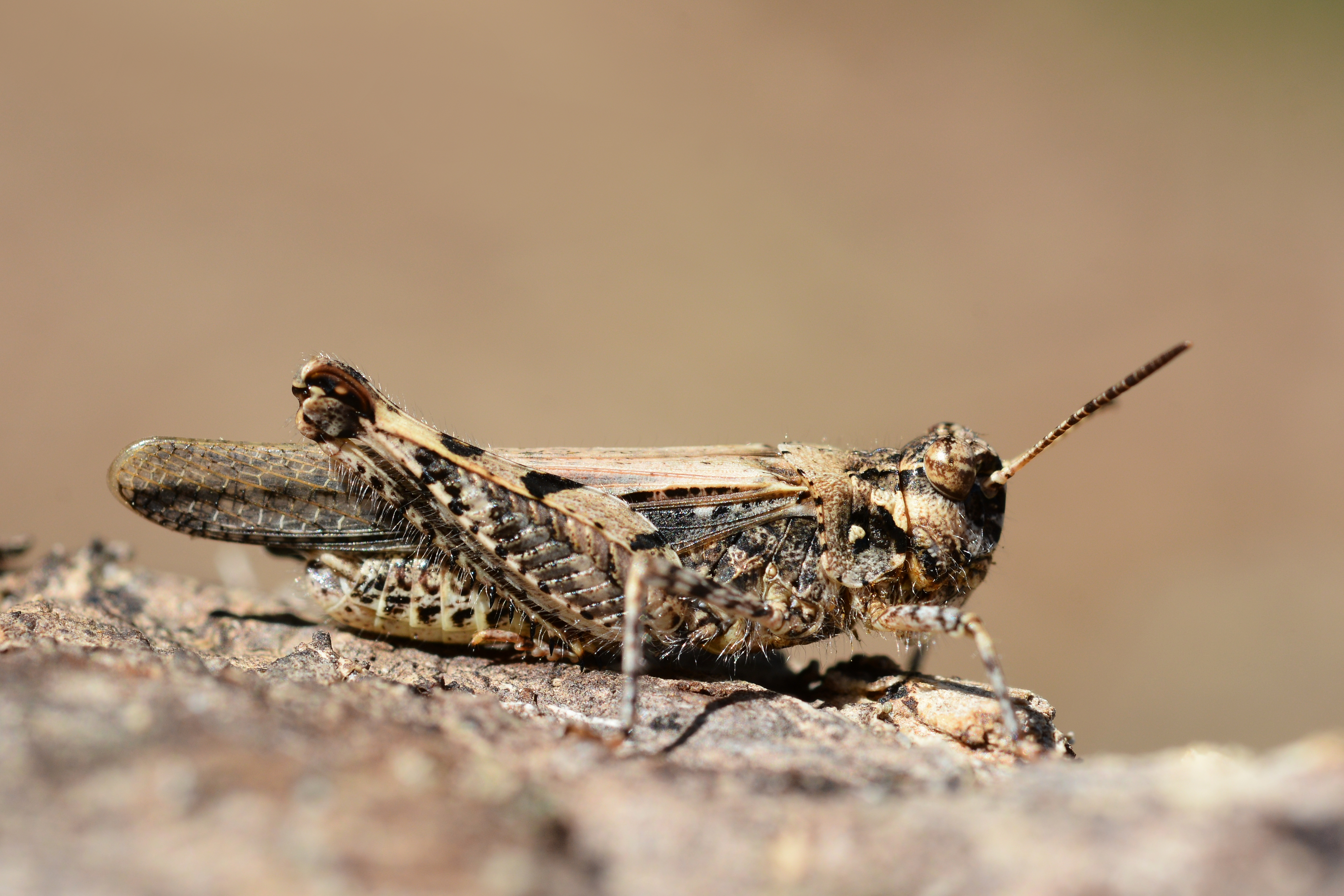
- Acrotylus insubricus, France

Conservation status
- Least Concern (IUCN 3.1)

Scientific classification
- Kingdom: Animalia
- Phylum: Arthropoda
- Clade: Pancrustacea
- Class: Insecta
- Order: Orthoptera
- Suborder: Caelifera
- Family: Acrididae
- Subfamily: Oedipodinae
- Tribe: Acrotylini
- Genus: Acrotylus
- Species: A. insubricus

Binomial name
- Acrotylus insubricus (Scopoli, 1786)

= Acrotylus insubricus =

Species of grasshopper

Acrotylus insubricus is a species of band-winged grasshopper in the family Acrididae. It is found in Europe, Africa, and Asia.

== Subspecies ==
These subspecies belong to the species Acrotylus insubricus:

- Acrotylus insubricus braudi Defaut, 2005
- Acrotylus insubricus inficitus (Walker, 1870)
- Acrotylus insubricus insubricus (Scopoli, 1786)
