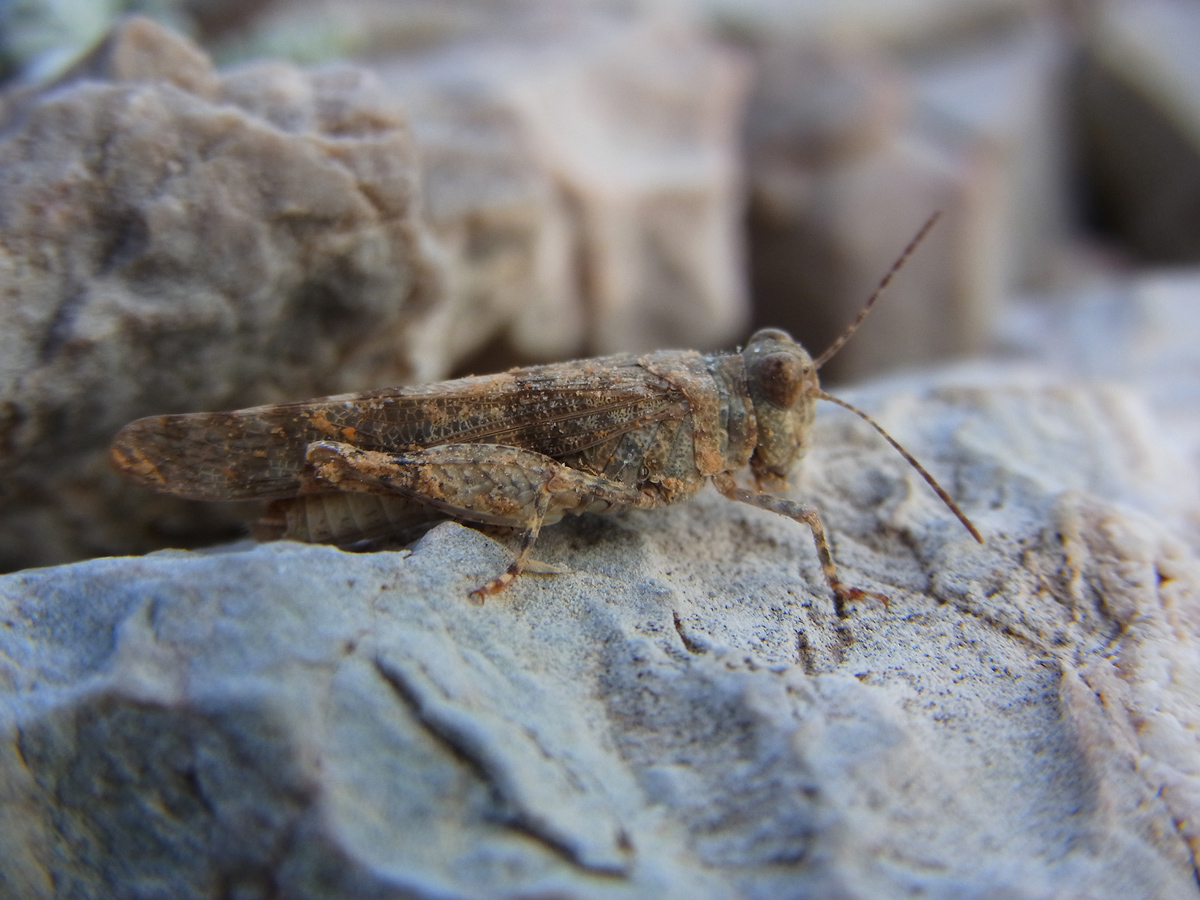

Conservation status
- Least Concern (IUCN 3.1)

Scientific classification
- Kingdom: Animalia
- Phylum: Arthropoda
- Class: Insecta
- Order: Orthoptera
- Suborder: Caelifera
- Family: Acrididae
- Genus: Acrotylus
- Species: A. patruelis

Binomial name
- Acrotylus patruelis (Herrich-Schäffer, 1838)
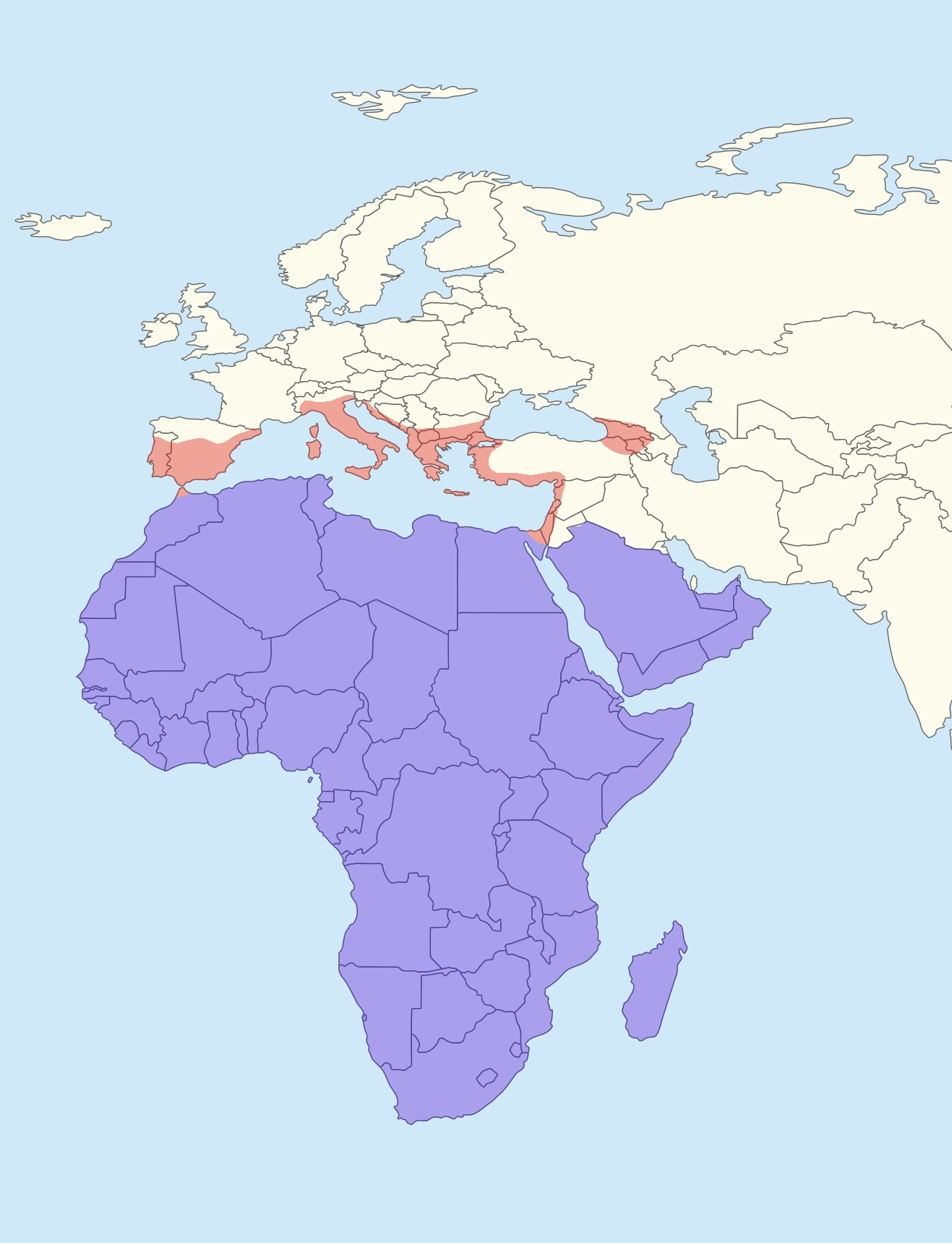
- Red - well-described habitat range; Blue - poorly described range(only countries in which species is present are highlighted)

= Slender burrowing grasshopper =

Species of grasshopper

The slender burrowing grasshopper (Acrotylus patruelis) is a species of bandwing grasshopper found throughout Africa, southern Europe and southwestern Asia. It occurs in many dry open habitats with bare ground, such as savannah, grassland and Mediterranean shrubland.
