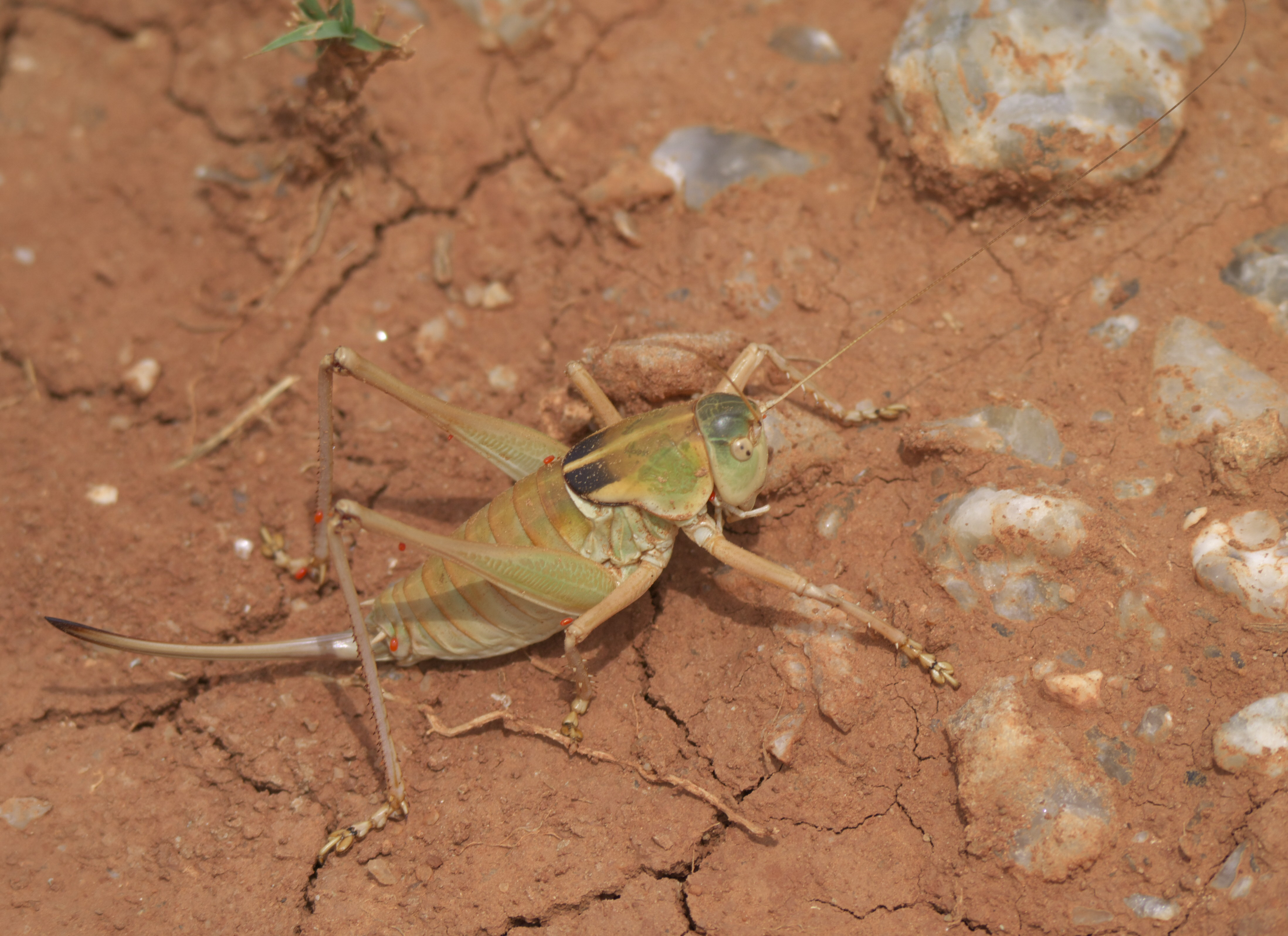

Scientific classification
- Kingdom: Animalia
- Phylum: Arthropoda
- Clade: Pancrustacea
- Class: Insecta
- Order: Orthoptera
- Suborder: Caelifera
- Family: Acrididae
- Genus: Pardalophora
- Species: P. haldemanii

Binomial name
- Pardalophora haldemanii (Scudder, 1872)

= Pardalophora haldemanii =

Species of grasshopper

Pardalophora haldemanii, known generally as the Haldeman's grasshopper or Haldeman's locust, is a species of band-winged grasshopper in the family Acrididae. It is found in North America.
