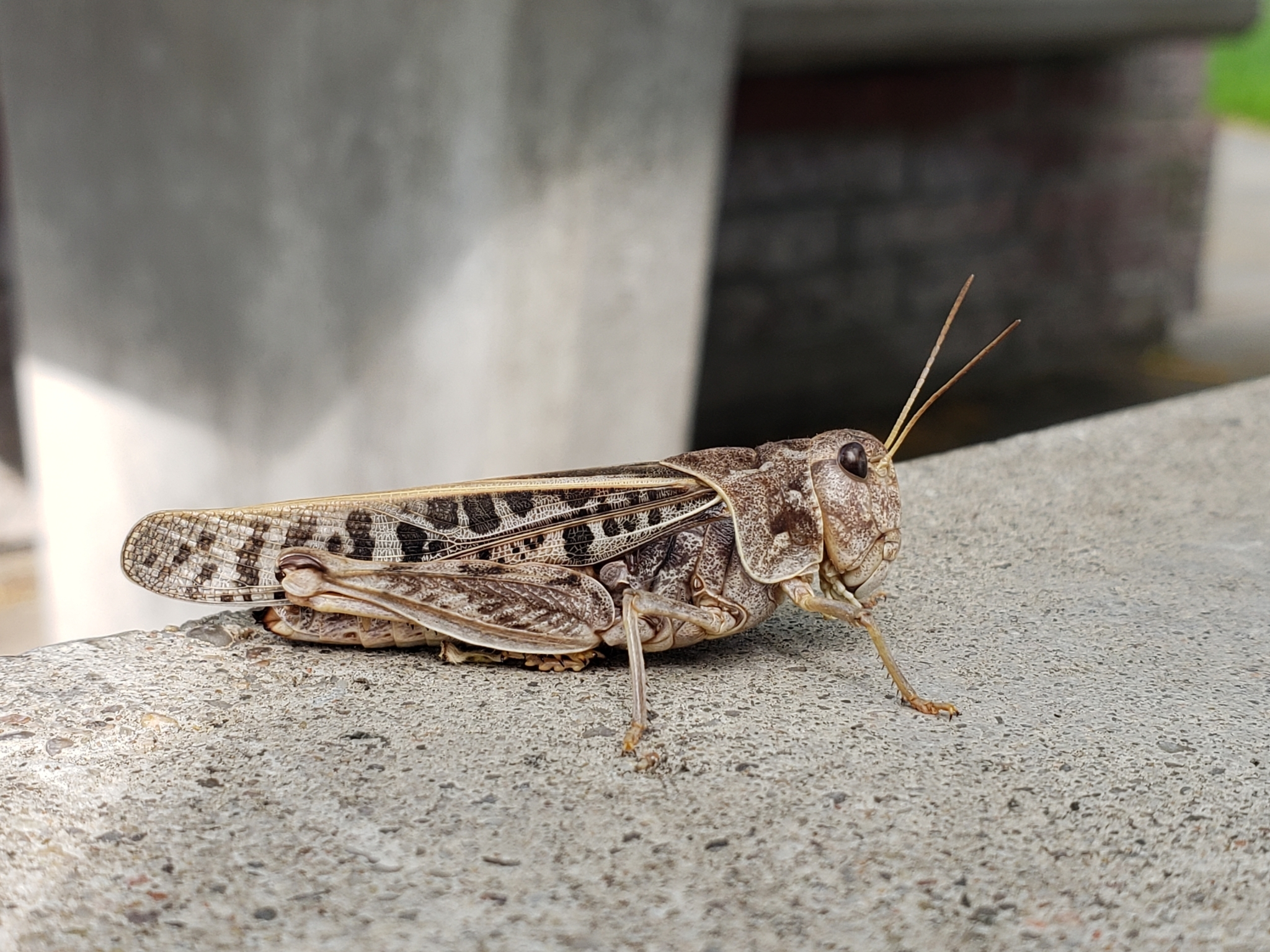
- Pardalophora apiculata

Scientific classification
- Kingdom: Animalia
- Phylum: Arthropoda
- Clade: Pancrustacea
- Class: Insecta
- Order: Orthoptera
- Suborder: Caelifera
- Family: Acrididae
- Subfamily: Oedipodinae
- Tribe: Hippiscini
- Genus: Pardalophora; Saussure, 1884

= Pardalophora =

Genus of grasshoppers

Pardalophora is a genus of Nearctic band-winged grasshoppers in the family Acrididae. There are at least four living species in Pardalophora.

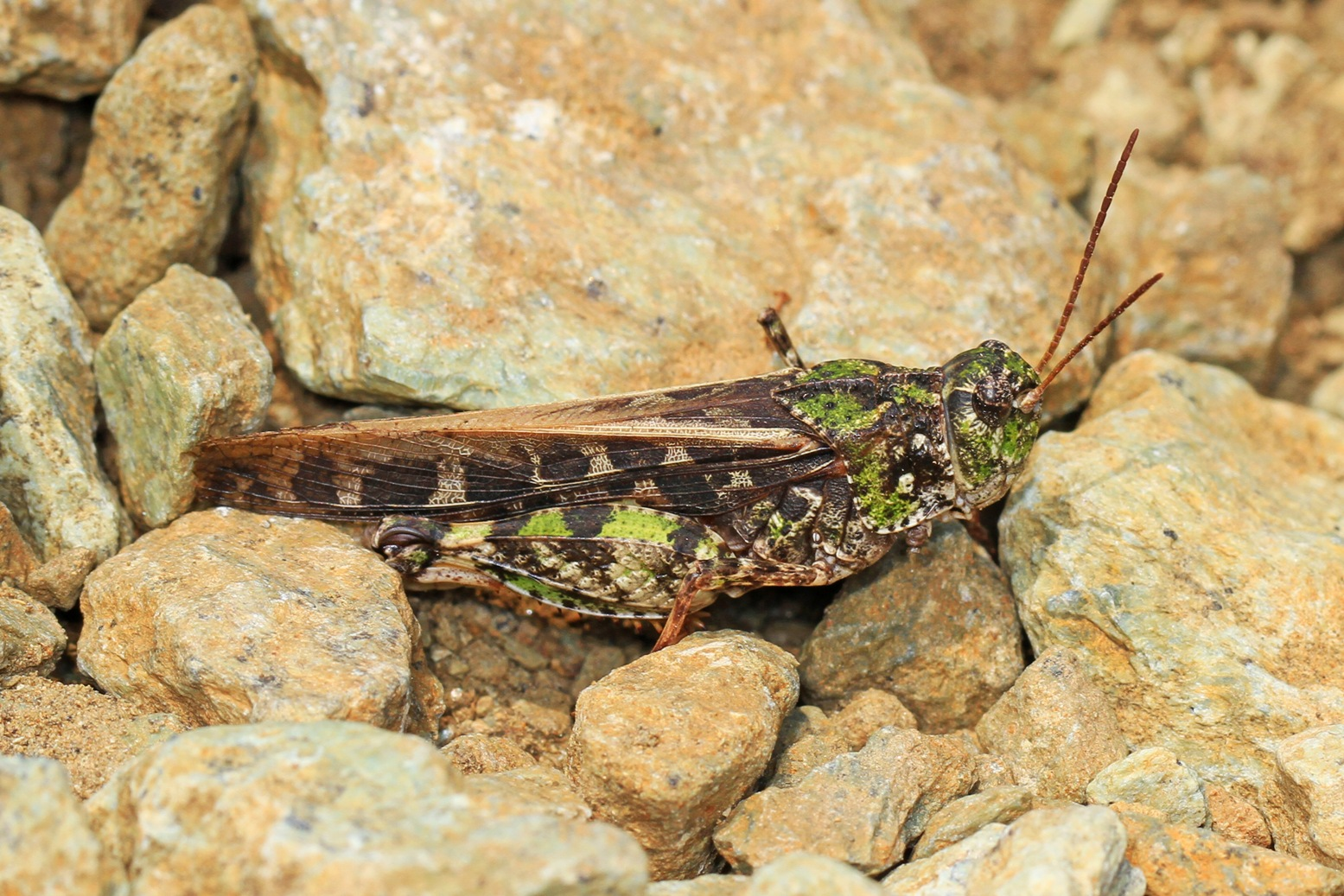
Pardalophora phoenicoptera

== Species ==
The Orthoptera Species File lists:

1. Pardalophora apiculata (Harris, 1835) (coral-winged grasshopper)
2. Pardalophora haldemanii (Scudder, 1872) (Haldeman's grasshopper)
3. †Pardalophora hungarica Poncrácz, 1928
4. Pardalophora phoenicoptera (Burmeister, 1838) (orange-winged grasshopper)
5. Pardalophora saussurei (Scudder, 1892) (Saussure's grasshopper)
