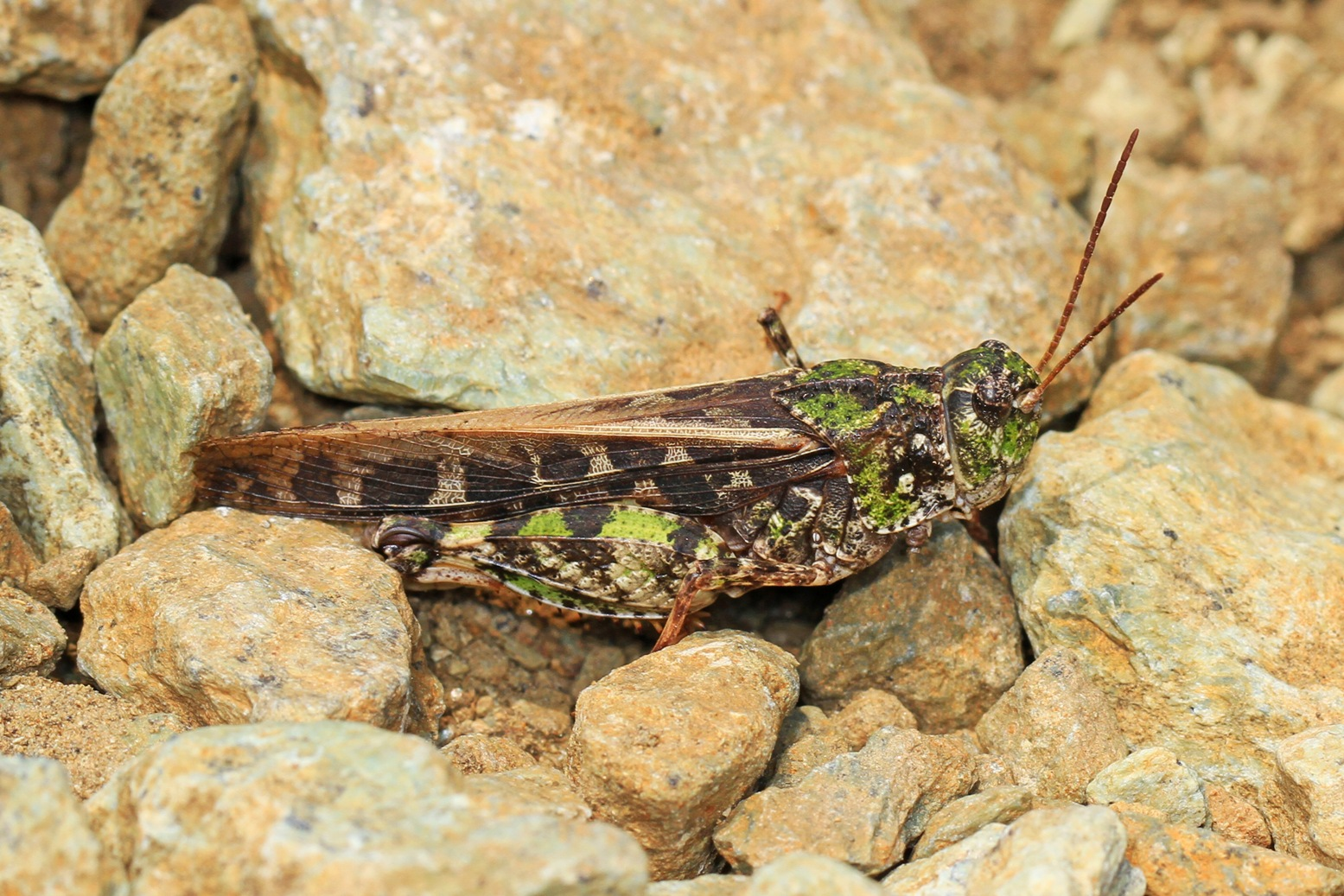

Scientific classification
- Kingdom: Animalia
- Phylum: Arthropoda
- Clade: Pancrustacea
- Class: Insecta
- Order: Orthoptera
- Suborder: Caelifera
- Family: Acrididae
- Genus: Pardalophora
- Species: P. phoenicoptera

Binomial name
- Pardalophora phoenicoptera (Burmeister, 1838)

= Pardalophora phoenicoptera =

Species of grasshopper

Pardalophora phoenicoptera, the orange-winged grasshopper, is a species of band-winged grasshopper in the family Acrididae. It is found in North America.
