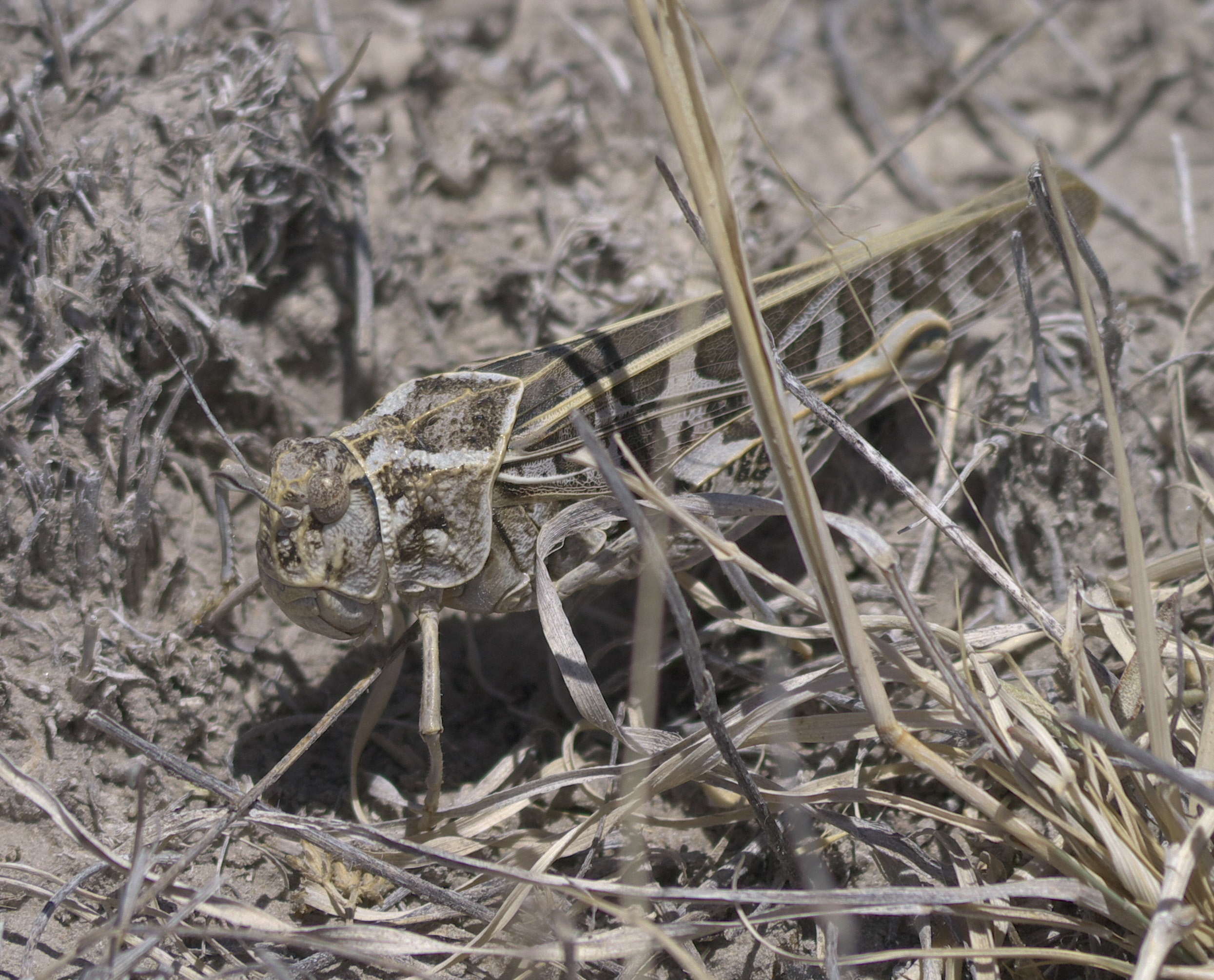

Scientific classification
- Kingdom: Animalia
- Phylum: Arthropoda
- Clade: Pancrustacea
- Class: Insecta
- Order: Orthoptera
- Suborder: Caelifera
- Family: Acrididae
- Tribe: Hippiscini
- Genus: Pardalophora
- Species: P. saussurei

Binomial name
- Pardalophora saussurei (Scudder, 1892)

= Pardalophora saussurei =

Species of grasshopper

Pardalophora saussurei, or Saussure's grasshopper, is a species of band-winged grasshopper in the family Acrididae. It is found in North America.
