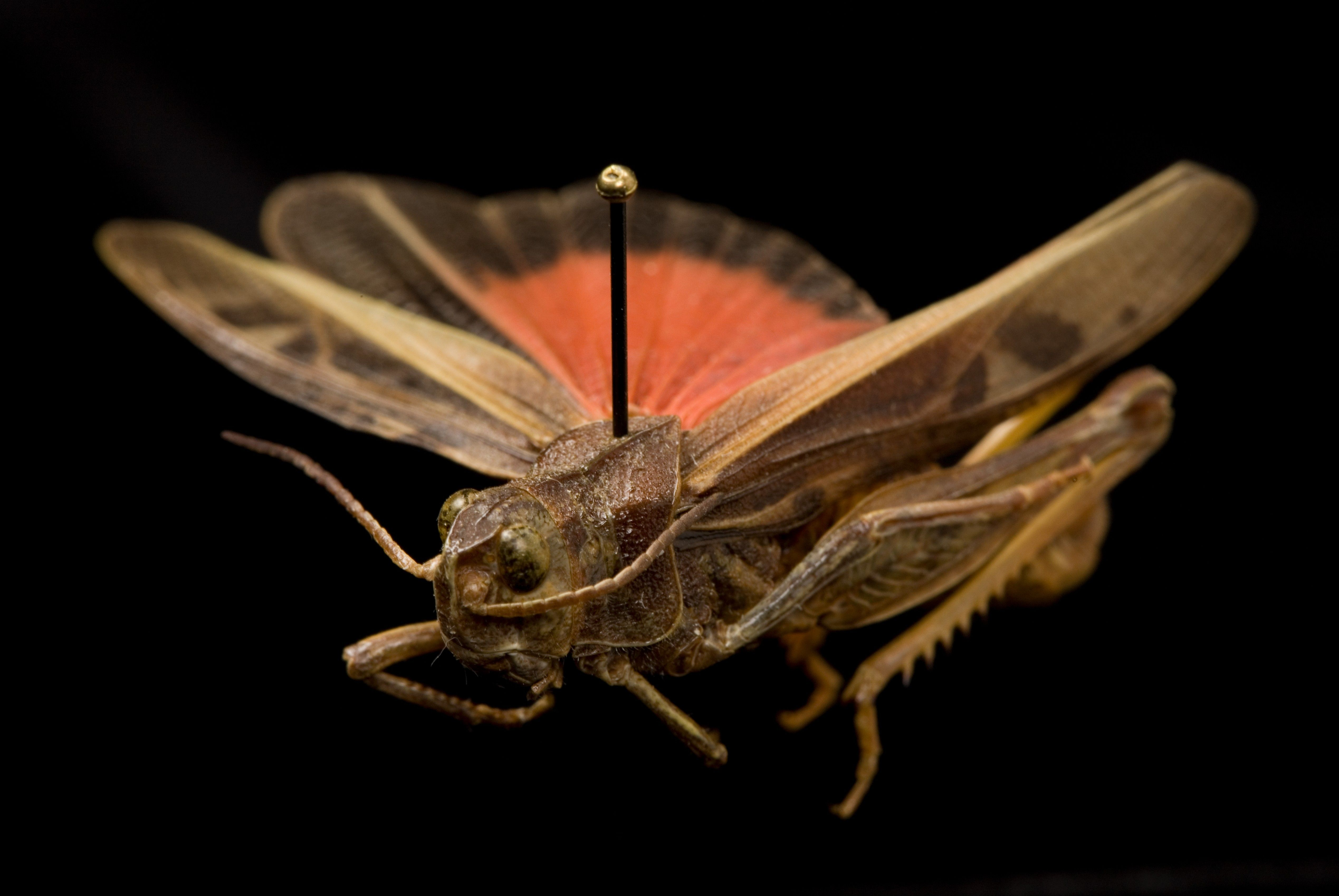

Scientific classification
- Kingdom: Animalia
- Phylum: Arthropoda
- Clade: Pancrustacea
- Class: Insecta
- Order: Orthoptera
- Suborder: Caelifera
- Family: Acrididae
- Genus: Pardalophora
- Species: P. apiculata

Binomial name
- Pardalophora apiculata (Harris, 1835)

= Pardalophora apiculata =

Species of grasshopper

Pardalophora apiculata, known generally as the coral-winged grasshopper or coral-winged locust, is a species of band-winged grasshopper in the family Acrididae. It is found in North America.
