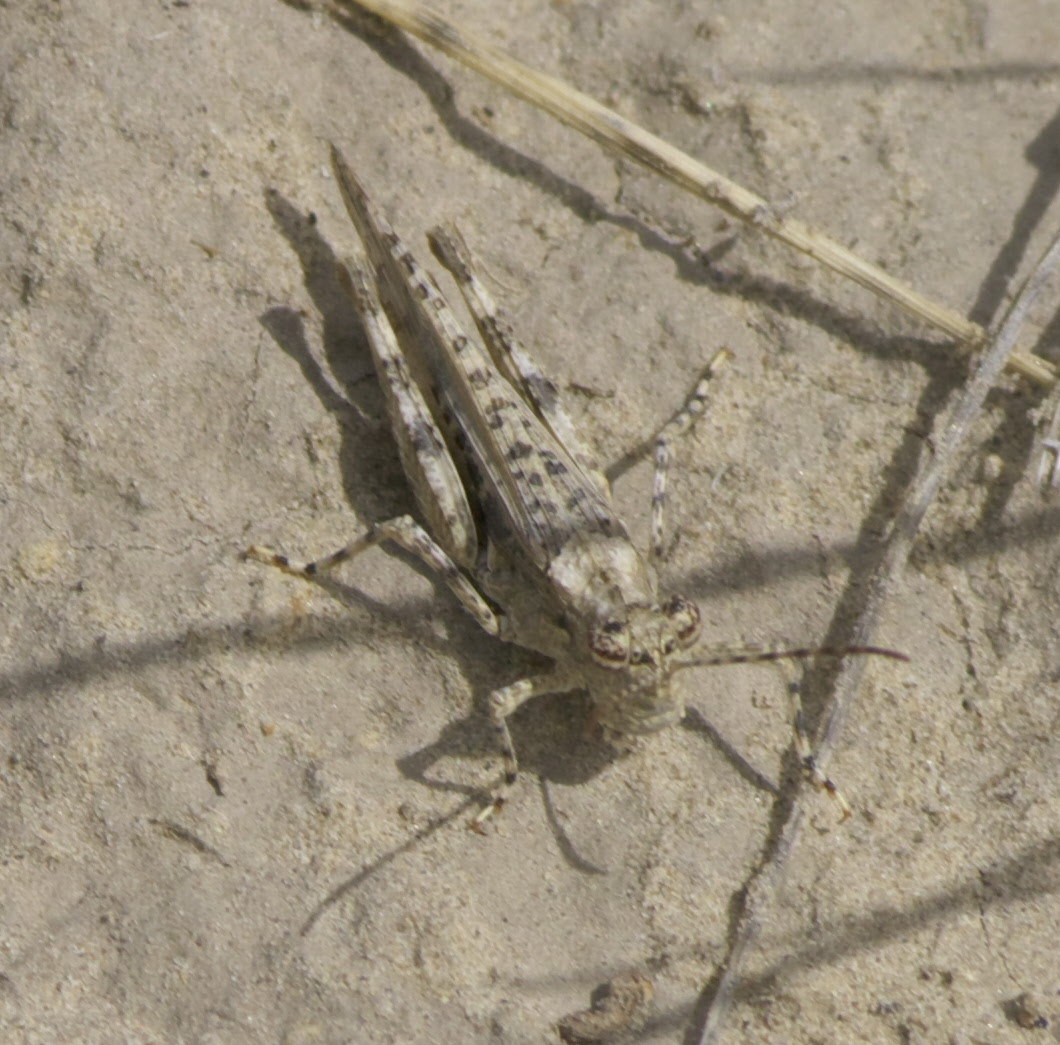

Scientific classification
- Kingdom: Animalia
- Phylum: Arthropoda
- Clade: Pancrustacea
- Class: Insecta
- Order: Orthoptera
- Suborder: Caelifera
- Family: Acrididae
- Genus: Derotmema
- Species: D. haydenii

Binomial name
- Derotmema haydenii (Thomas, 1872)

= Derotmema haydenii =

Species of grasshopper

Derotmema haydenii, or Hayden's grasshopper, is a species of band-winged grasshopper in the family Acrididae. It is found in Central America and North America.

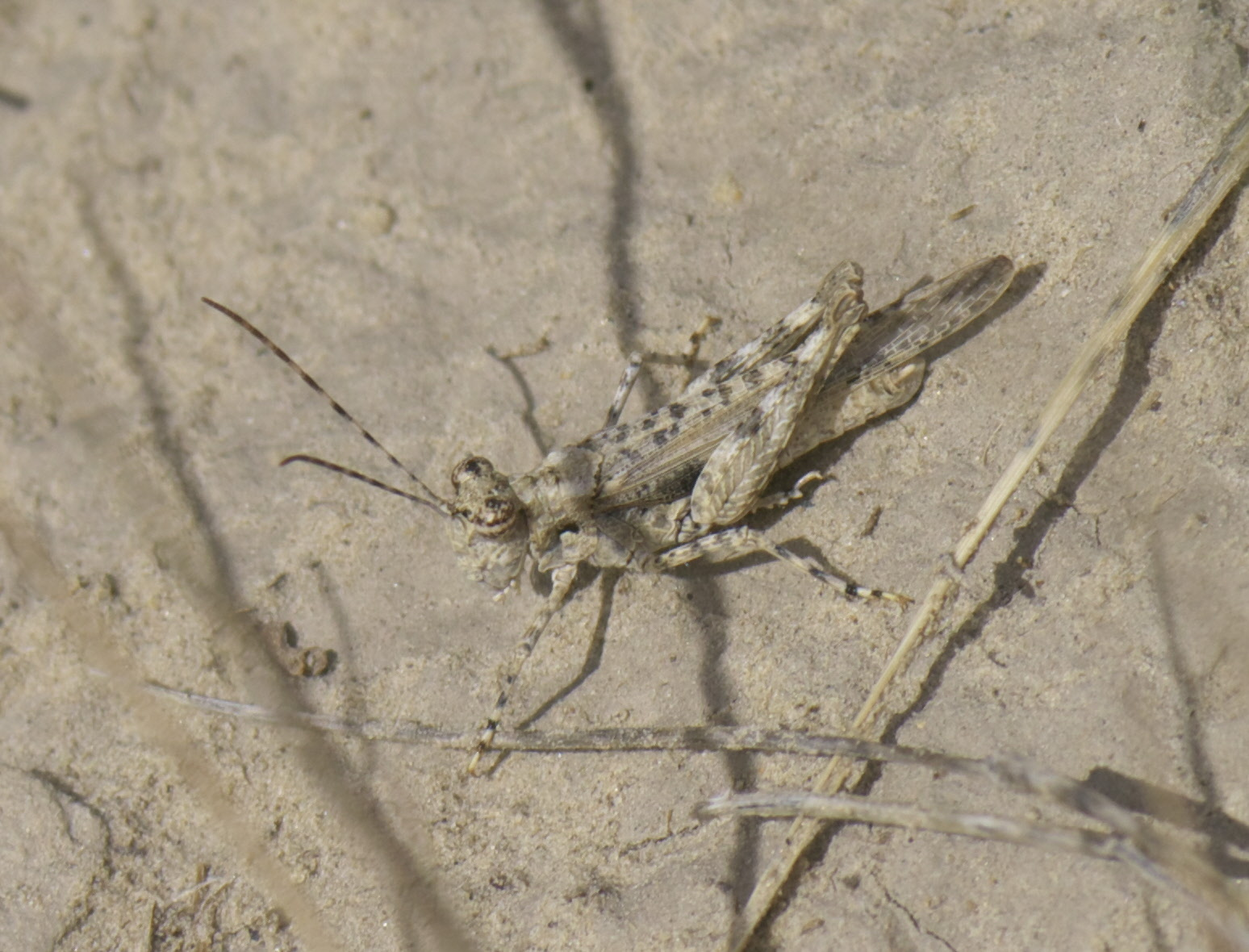
Hayden's grasshopper, Derotmema haydenii
