= Derotmema piute =

Scientific classification
- Kingdom: Animalia
- Phylum: Arthropoda
- Clade: Pancrustacea
- Class: Insecta
- Order: Orthoptera
- Suborder: Caelifera
- Family: Acrididae
- Tribe: Psinidiini
- Genus: Derotmema
- Species: D. piute

Binomial name
- Derotmema piute Rehn, 1919

Species of grasshopper

Derotmema piute is a species of band-winged grasshopper in the family Acrididae. It is found in North America.
