= Derotmema saussureanum =

Scientific classification
- Kingdom: Animalia
- Phylum: Arthropoda
- Clade: Pancrustacea
- Class: Insecta
- Order: Orthoptera
- Suborder: Caelifera
- Family: Acrididae
- Tribe: Psinidiini
- Genus: Derotmema
- Species: D. saussureanum

Binomial name
- Derotmema saussureanum Scudder, 1901

Species of grasshopper

Derotmema saussureanum, or Saussure's desert grasshopper, is a species of band-winged grasshopper in the family Acrididae. It is known from southern California south to northern Baja California Sur.
