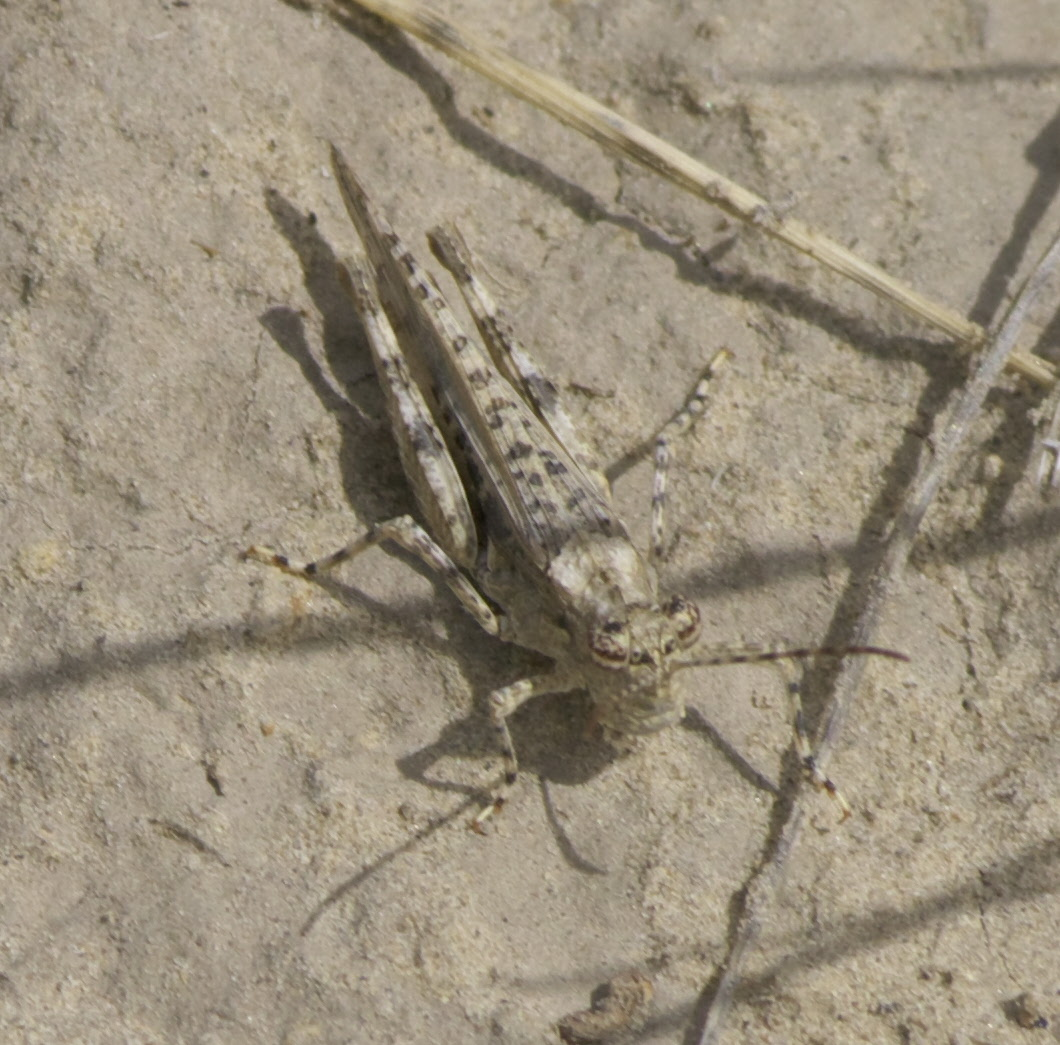
- Derotmema haydenii

Scientific classification
- Kingdom: Animalia
- Phylum: Arthropoda
- Clade: Pancrustacea
- Class: Insecta
- Order: Orthoptera
- Suborder: Caelifera
- Family: Acrididae
- Subfamily: Oedipodinae
- Tribe: Psinidiini
- Genus: Derotmema; Scudder, 1876

= Derotmema =

Genus of grasshoppers

Derotmema is a genus of band-winged grasshoppers in the family Acrididae. There are about five described species in Derotmema.

== Species ==
These five species belong to the genus Derotmema:

- Derotmema delicatulum Scudder, 1901 (delicate grasshopper)
- Derotmema haydenii (Thomas, 1872) (Hayden's grasshopper)
- Derotmema laticinctum Scudder, 1901
- Derotmema piute Rehn, 1919
- Derotmema saussureanum Scudder, 1901 (Saussure's desert grasshopper)
