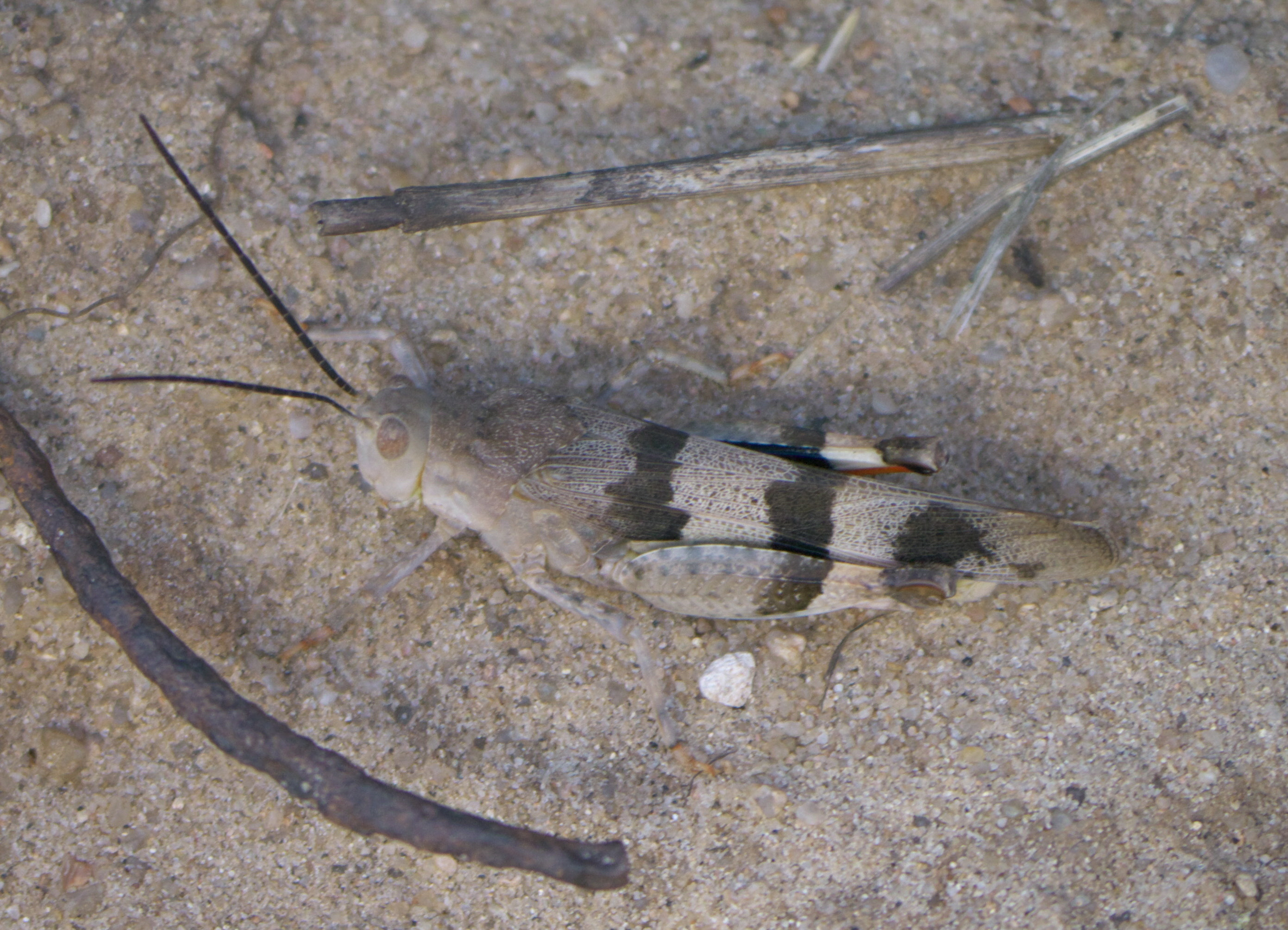

Scientific classification
- Domain: Eukaryota
- Kingdom: Animalia
- Phylum: Arthropoda
- Class: Insecta
- Order: Orthoptera
- Suborder: Caelifera
- Family: Acrididae
- Genus: Hadrotettix
- Species: H. trifasciatus

Binomial name
- Hadrotettix trifasciatus (Say, 1828)

= Hadrotettix trifasciatus =

Species of grasshopper

Hadrotettix trifasciatus, known generally as the three-banded grasshopper or three-banded range grasshopper, is a species of band-winged grasshopper in the family Acrididae. It is found in North America.

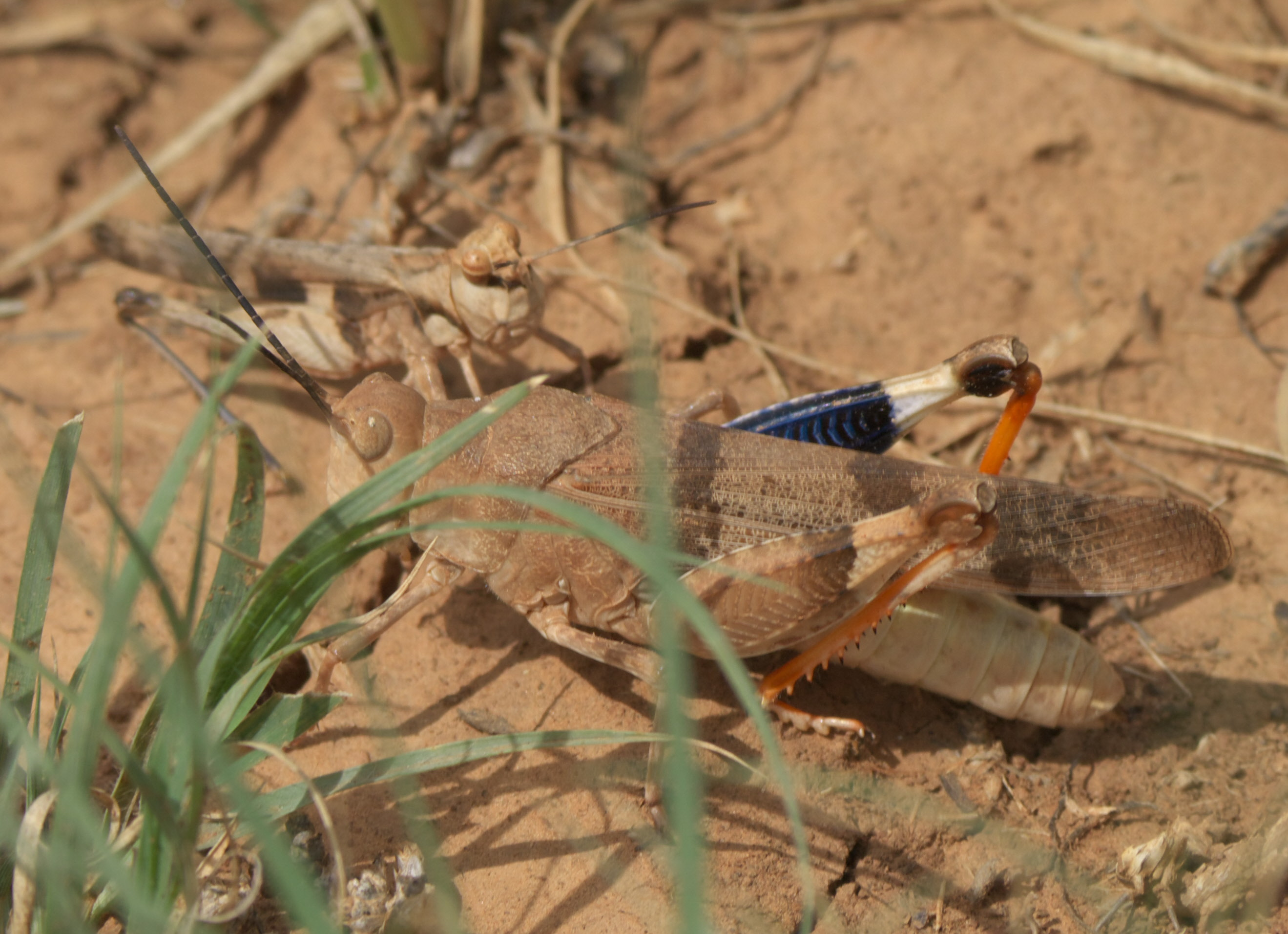
Three-banded grasshopper, Hadrotettix trifasciatus
