= Hadrotettix magnificus =

Scientific classification
- Domain: Eukaryota
- Kingdom: Animalia
- Phylum: Arthropoda
- Class: Insecta
- Order: Orthoptera
- Suborder: Caelifera
- Family: Acrididae
- Tribe: Hippiscini
- Genus: Hadrotettix
- Species: H. magnificus

Binomial name
- Hadrotettix magnificus (Rehn, 1907)

Species of grasshopper

Hadrotettix magnificus, the magnificent grasshopper, is a species of band-winged grasshopper in the family Acrididae. It is found in North America.
