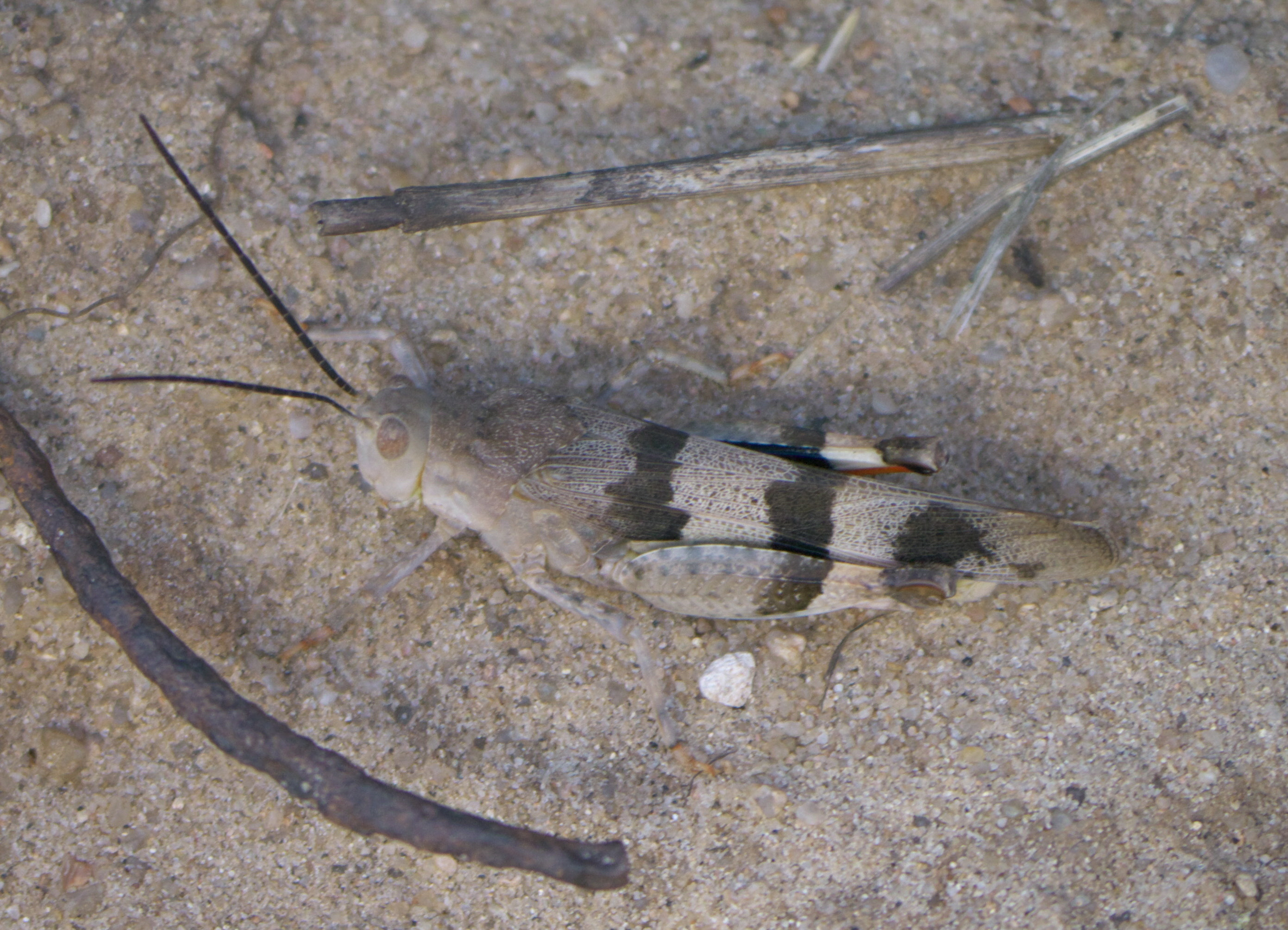
- Hadrotettix trifasciatus

Scientific classification
- Domain: Eukaryota
- Kingdom: Animalia
- Phylum: Arthropoda
- Class: Insecta
- Order: Orthoptera
- Suborder: Caelifera
- Family: Acrididae
- Subfamily: Oedipodinae
- Tribe: Hippiscini
- Genus: Hadrotettix; Scudder, 1876

= Hadrotettix =

Genus of grasshoppers

Hadrotettix is a genus of band-winged grasshoppers in the family Acrididae. There are at least four described species in Hadrotettix.

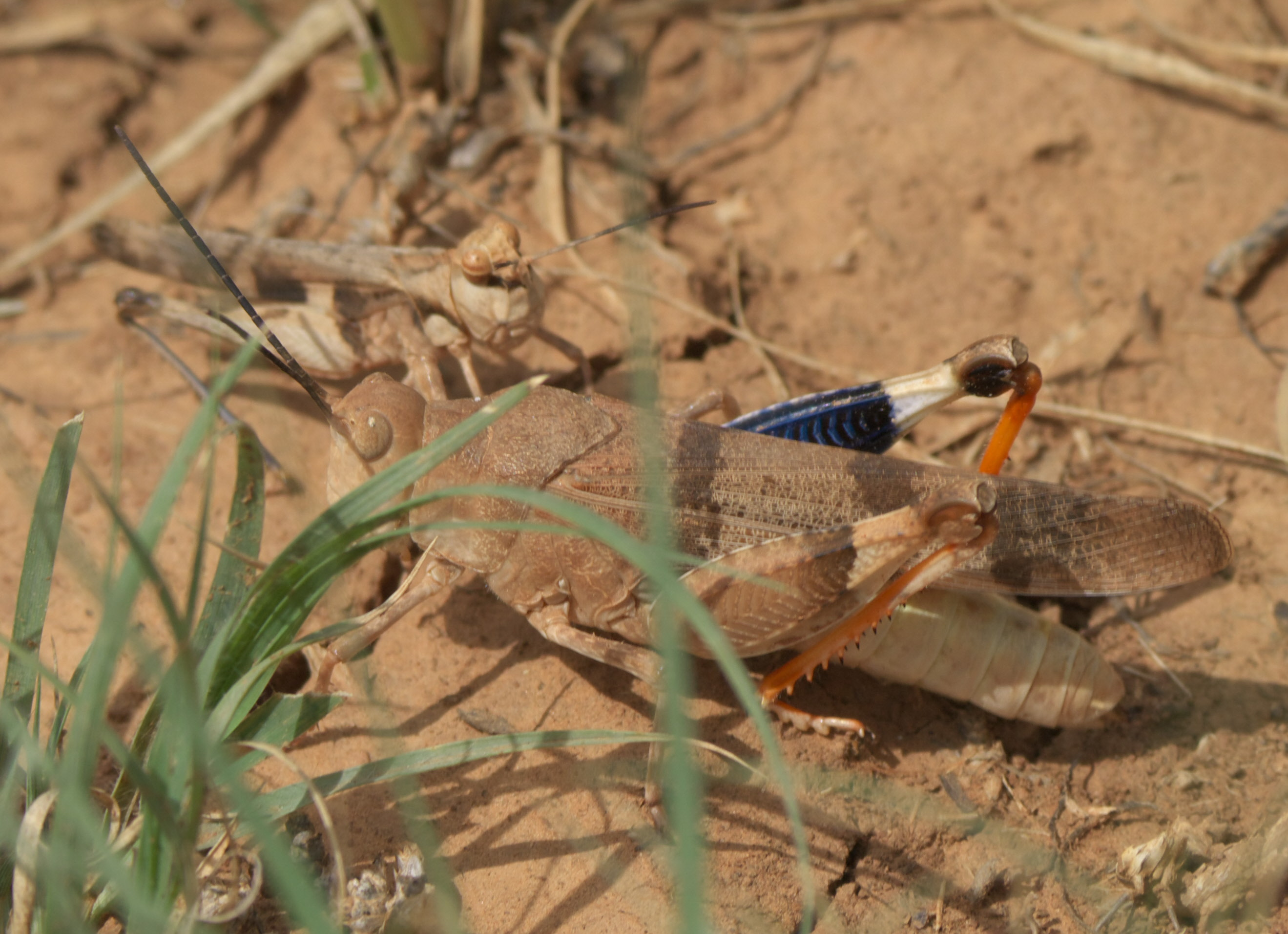
Hadrotettix trifasciatus

== Species ==
These four species belong to the genus Hadrotettix:

- Hadrotettix magnificus (Rehn, 1907) — Magnificent grasshopper
- Hadrotettix nebulosus Scudder, 1900
- Hadrotettix scotodes Otte, 1984
- Hadrotettix trifasciatus (Say, 1828) — Three-banded grasshopper
