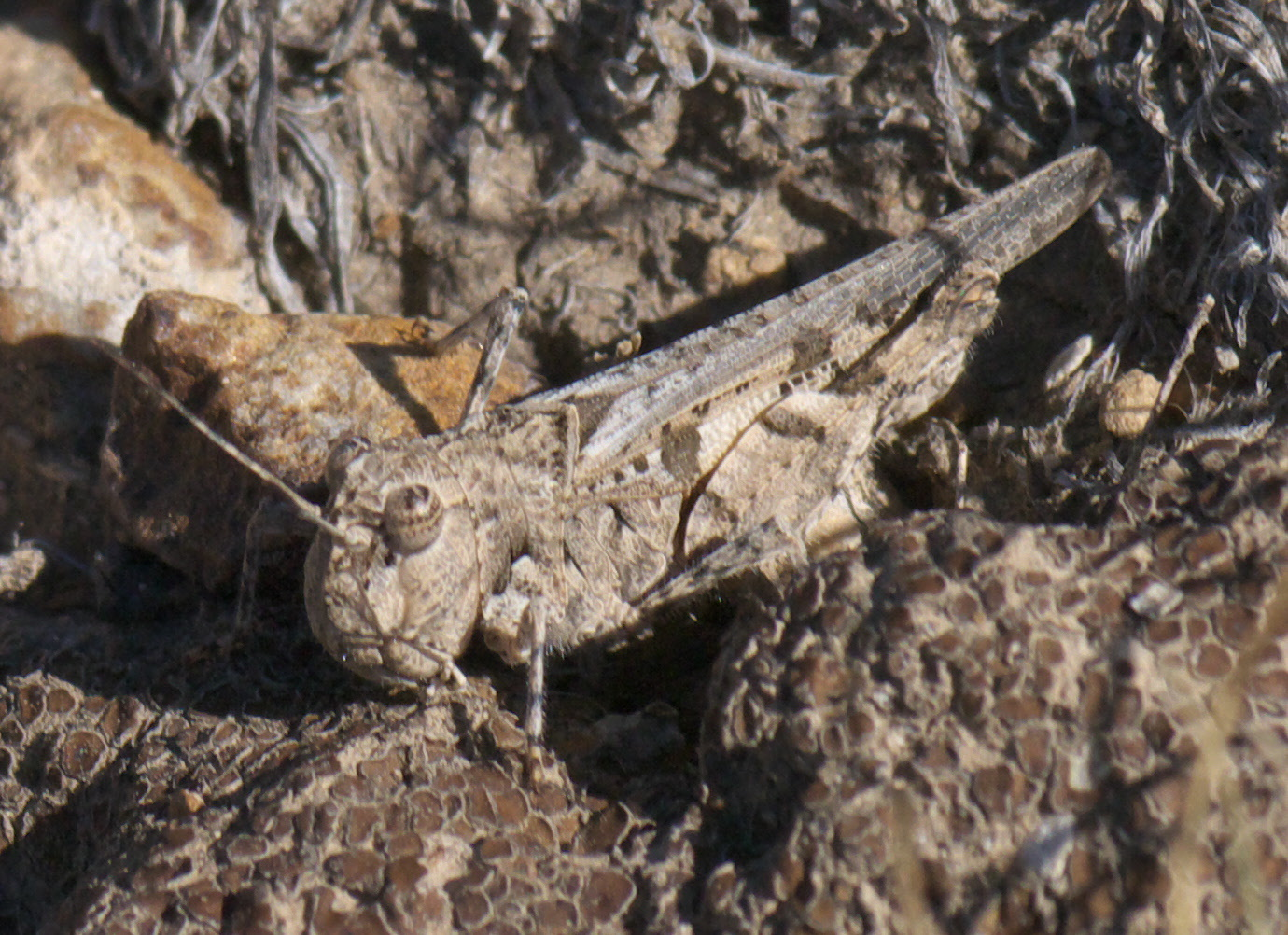
- Trachyrhachys aspera, Oklahoma

Scientific classification
- Kingdom: Animalia
- Phylum: Arthropoda
- Clade: Pancrustacea
- Class: Insecta
- Order: Orthoptera
- Suborder: Caelifera
- Family: Acrididae
- Tribe: Psinidiini
- Genus: Trachyrhachys
- Species: T. aspera

Binomial name
- Trachyrhachys aspera Scudder, 1876

= Trachyrhachys aspera =

Species of grasshopper

Trachyrhachys aspera, the finned grasshopper, is a species of band-winged grasshopper in the family Acrididae. It is found in Central America and North America.
