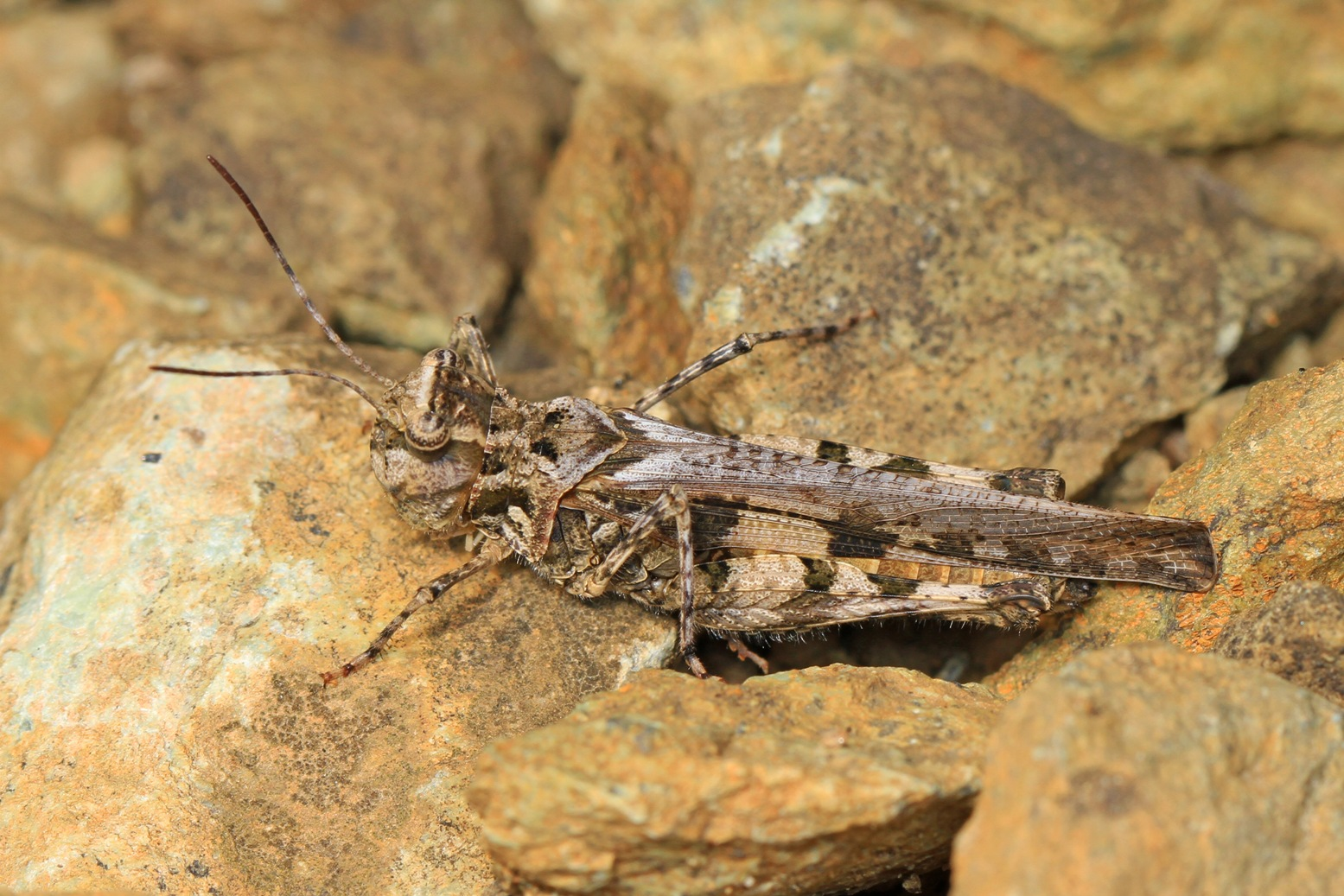
- Trachyrhachys kiowa

Scientific classification
- Domain: Eukaryota
- Kingdom: Animalia
- Phylum: Arthropoda
- Class: Insecta
- Order: Orthoptera
- Suborder: Caelifera
- Family: Acrididae
- Subfamily: Oedipodinae
- Tribe: Psinidiini
- Genus: Trachyrhachys; Scudder, 1876

= Trachyrhachys =

Genus of grasshoppers

Trachyrhachys is a genus of band-winged grasshoppers in the family Acrididae. There are at least four described species in Trachyrhachys.

== Species ==
These four species belong to the genus Trachyrhachys:

- Trachyrhachys aspera Scudder, 1876 (finned grasshopper)
- Trachyrhachys coronata Scudder, 1876 (crowned grasshopper)
- Trachyrhachys funeralis Strohecker, 1945
- Trachyrhachys kiowa (Thomas, 1872) (Kiowa grasshopper)
