= Trachyrhachys coronata =

Scientific classification
- Domain: Eukaryota
- Kingdom: Animalia
- Phylum: Arthropoda
- Class: Insecta
- Order: Orthoptera
- Suborder: Caelifera
- Family: Acrididae
- Tribe: Psinidiini
- Genus: Trachyrhachys
- Species: T. coronata

Binomial name
- Trachyrhachys coronata Scudder, 1876

Species of grasshopper

Trachyrhachys coronata, the crowned grasshopper, is a species of band-winged grasshopper in the family Acrididae. It is found in North America.
