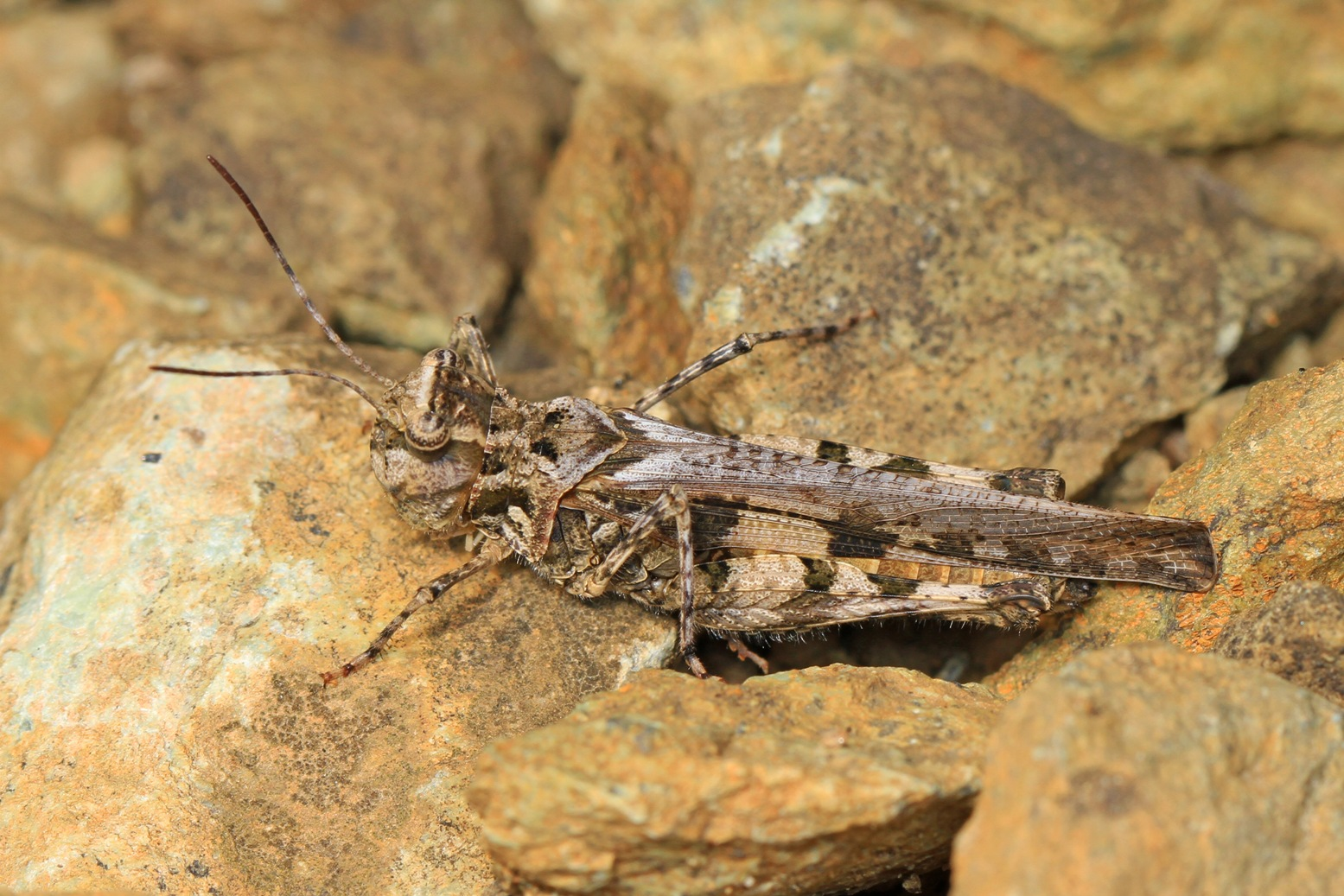

Scientific classification
- Domain: Eukaryota
- Kingdom: Animalia
- Phylum: Arthropoda
- Class: Insecta
- Order: Orthoptera
- Suborder: Caelifera
- Family: Acrididae
- Tribe: Psinidiini
- Genus: Trachyrhachys
- Species: T. kiowa

Binomial name
- Trachyrhachys kiowa (Thomas, 1872)

= Trachyrhachys kiowa =

Species of grasshopper

Trachyrhachys kiowa, known generally as the Kiowa grasshopper or ash-brown grasshopper, is a species of band-winged grasshopper in the family Acrididae. It is found in Central America and North America.
