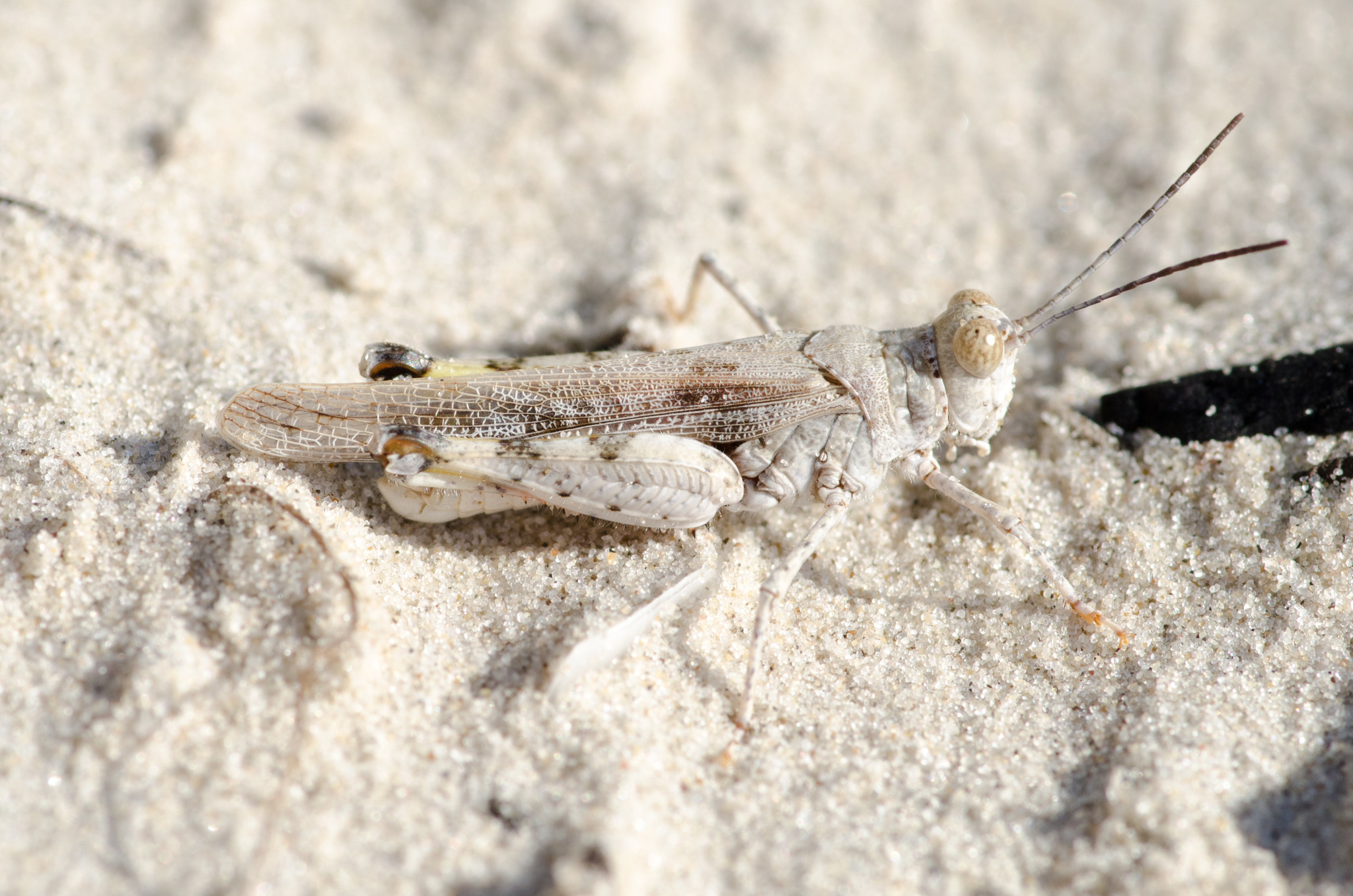

Scientific classification
- Domain: Eukaryota
- Kingdom: Animalia
- Phylum: Arthropoda
- Class: Insecta
- Order: Orthoptera
- Suborder: Caelifera
- Family: Acrididae
- Tribe: Hippiscini
- Genus: Heliastus
- Species: H. subroseus

Binomial name
- Heliastus subroseus Caudell, 1904

= Heliastus subroseus =

Species of grasshopper

Heliastus subroseus, the rose-wing beach grasshopper, is a species of band-winged grasshopper in the family Acrididae. It is found in North America.
