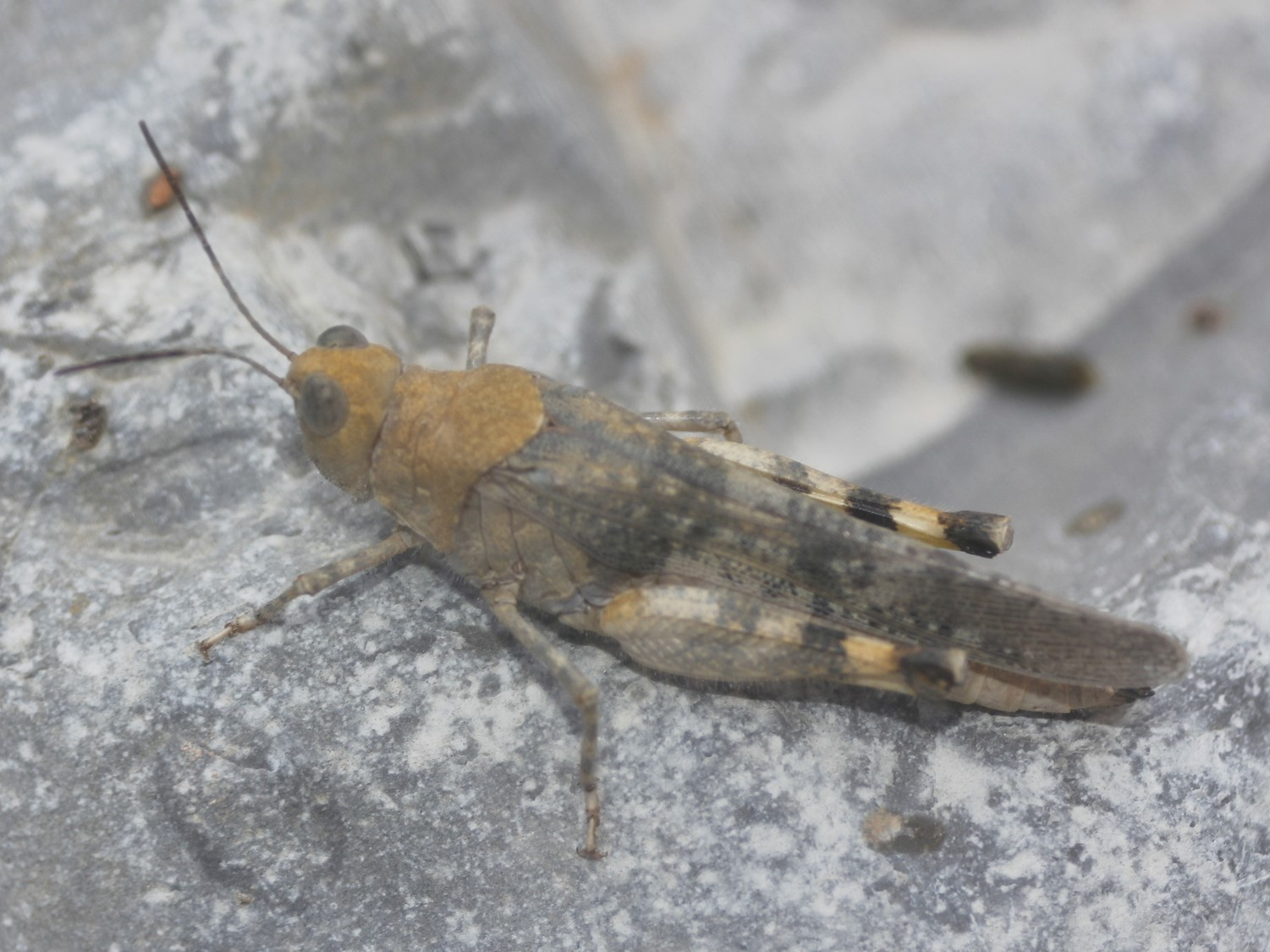
- Heliastus aztecus

Scientific classification
- Domain: Eukaryota
- Kingdom: Animalia
- Phylum: Arthropoda
- Class: Insecta
- Order: Orthoptera
- Suborder: Caelifera
- Family: Acrididae
- Subfamily: Oedipodinae
- Tribe: Hippiscini
- Genus: Heliastus; Saussure, 1884

= Heliastus =

Genus of grasshoppers

Heliastus is a genus of band-winged grasshoppers in the family Acrididae. There are about 10 described species in the genus Heliastus.

== Species ==
These 10 species belong to the genus Heliastus:

- Heliastus aztecus Saussure, 1884
- Heliastus benjamini Caudell, 1905 (arroyo grasshopper)
- Heliastus cirrhoides Otte, 1984
- Heliastus guanieri Caudell, 1903
- Heliastus infrequens Otte, 1984
- Heliastus obesus Saussure, 1884
- Heliastus rubellus Otte, 1984
- Heliastus rufipennis Liebermann, 1945
- Heliastus subroseus Caudell, 1904 (rose-wing beach grasshopper)
- Heliastus sumichrasti (Saussure, 1861)
