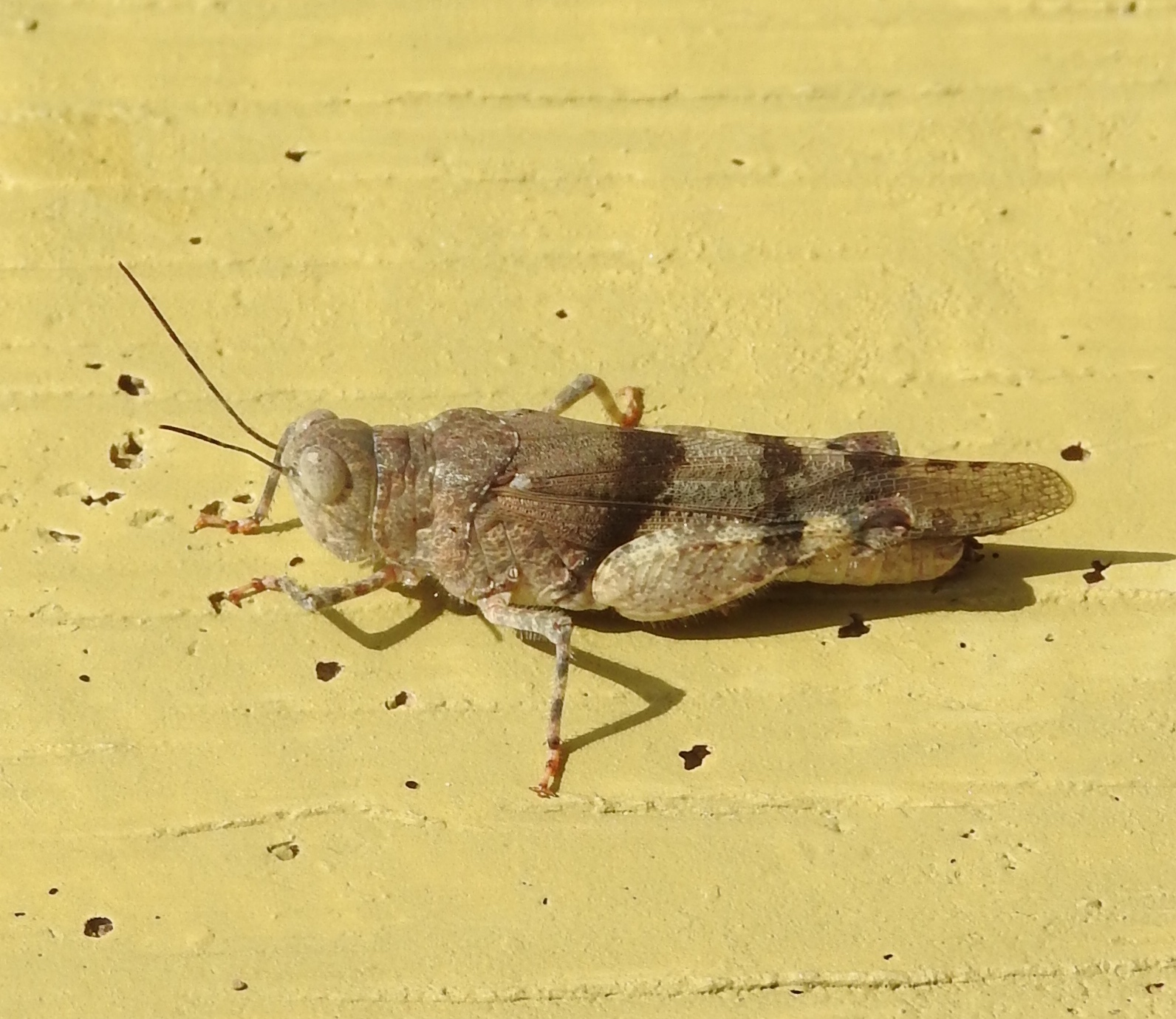

Scientific classification
- Domain: Eukaryota
- Kingdom: Animalia
- Phylum: Arthropoda
- Class: Insecta
- Order: Orthoptera
- Suborder: Caelifera
- Family: Acrididae
- Tribe: Hippiscini
- Genus: Heliastus
- Species: H. benjamini

Binomial name
- Heliastus benjamini Caudell, 1905

= Heliastus benjamini =

Species of grasshopper

Heliastus benjamini, the arroyo grasshopper, is a species of band-winged grasshopper in the family Acrididae. It is found in North America.
