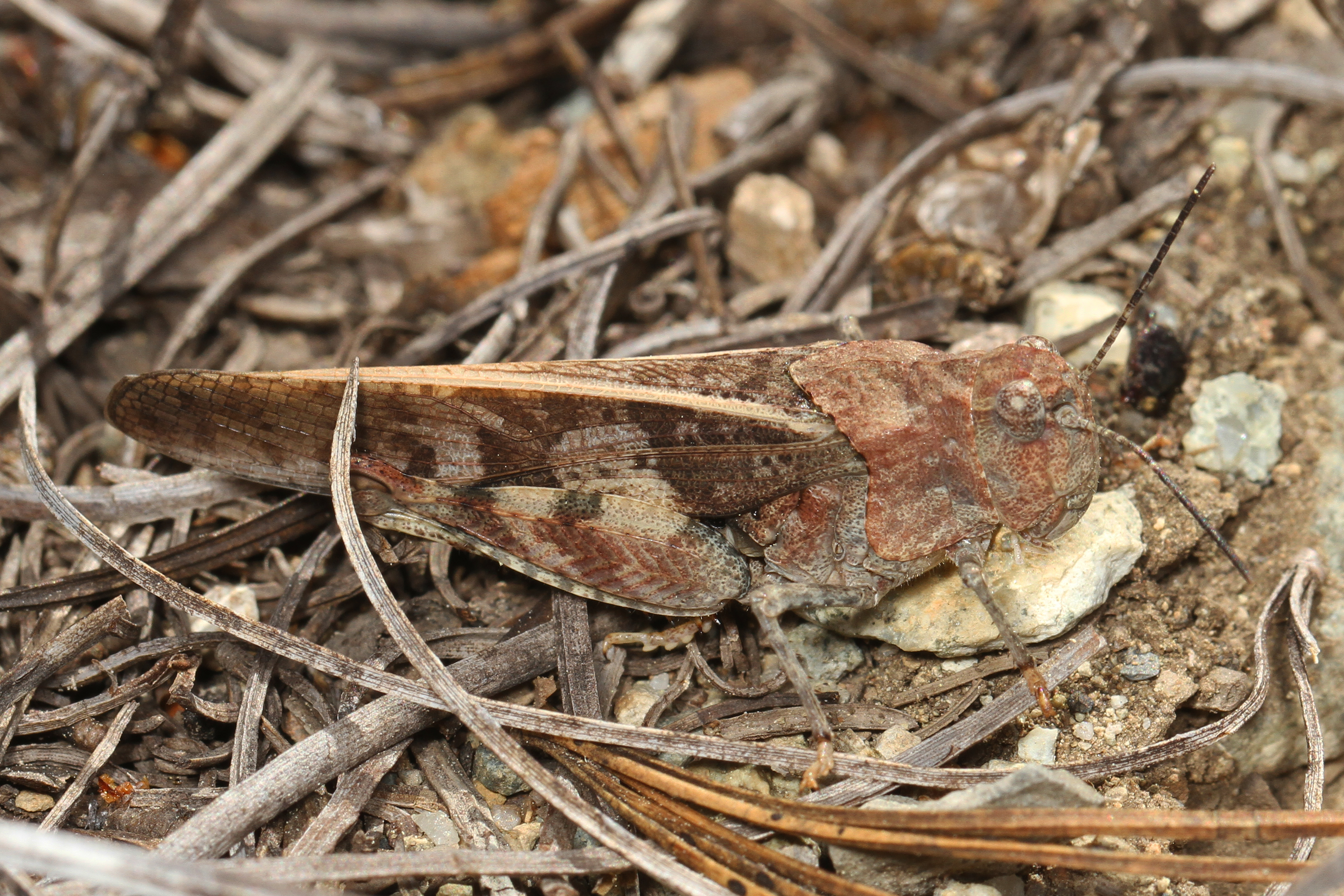

Scientific classification
- Domain: Eukaryota
- Kingdom: Animalia
- Phylum: Arthropoda
- Class: Insecta
- Order: Orthoptera
- Suborder: Caelifera
- Family: Acrididae
- Tribe: Hippiscini
- Genus: Cratypedes
- Species: C. neglectus

Binomial name
- Cratypedes neglectus (Thomas, 1870)

= Cratypedes neglectus =

Species of grasshopper

Cratypedes neglectus, the pronotal range grasshopper, is a species of band-winged grasshopper in the family Acrididae. It is found in North America. It feeds on sagebrush.
