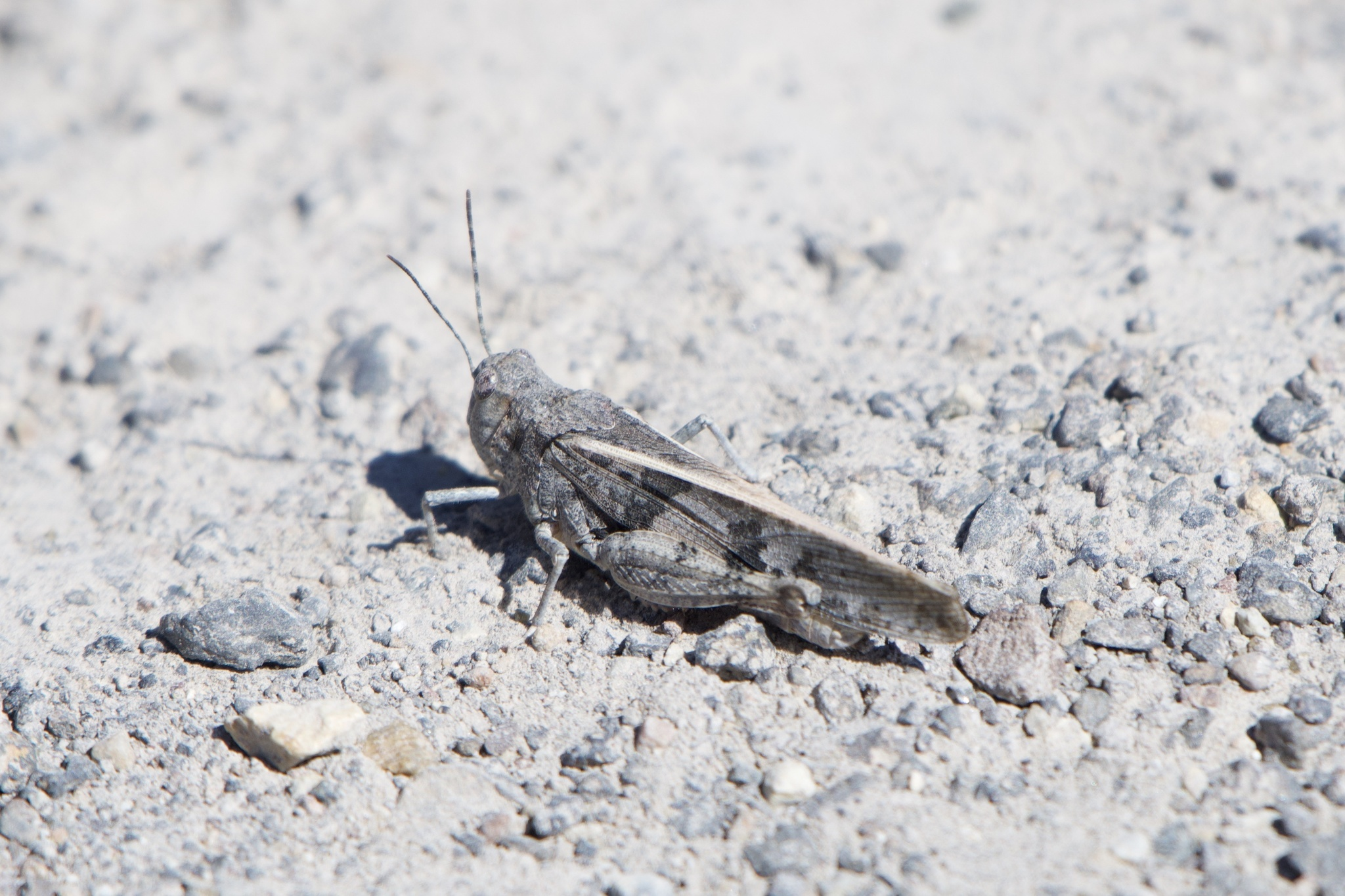

Scientific classification
- Domain: Eukaryota
- Kingdom: Animalia
- Phylum: Arthropoda
- Class: Insecta
- Order: Orthoptera
- Suborder: Caelifera
- Family: Acrididae
- Tribe: Hippiscini
- Genus: Cratypedes
- Species: C. lateritius

Binomial name
- Cratypedes lateritius (Saussure, 1884)

= Cratypedes lateritius =

Species of grasshopper

Cratypedes lateritius, the Nevada red-winged grasshopper, is a species of band-winged grasshopper in the family Acrididae. It is found in North America.
