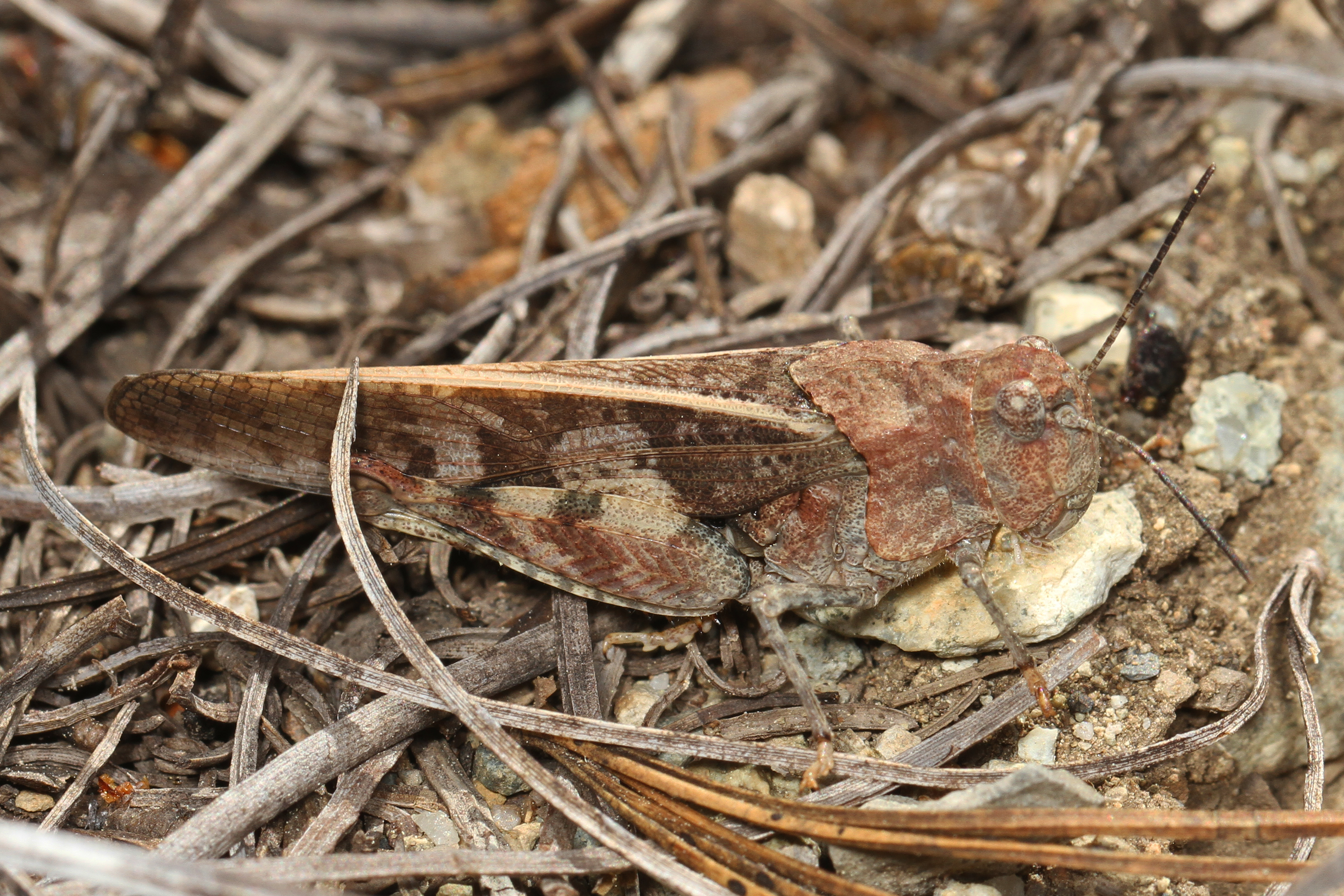
- Cratypedes neglectus

Scientific classification
- Kingdom: Animalia
- Phylum: Arthropoda
- Class: Insecta
- Order: Orthoptera
- Suborder: Caelifera
- Family: Acrididae
- Subfamily: Oedipodinae
- Tribe: Hippiscini
- Genus: Cratypedes; Scudder, 1876

= Cratypedes =

Genus of grasshoppers

Cratypedes is a genus of band-winged grasshoppers in the family Acrididae. There are at least two described species in Cratypedes.

== Species ==
These two species belong to the genus Cratypedes:

- Cratypedes lateritius (Saussure, 1884) — Nevada red-winged grasshopper
- Cratypedes neglectus (Thomas, 1870) — Pronotal range grasshopper
