= Chimarocephala elongata =

Scientific classification
- Domain: Eukaryota
- Kingdom: Animalia
- Phylum: Arthropoda
- Class: Insecta
- Order: Orthoptera
- Suborder: Caelifera
- Family: Acrididae
- Tribe: Chortophagini
- Genus: Chimarocephala
- Species: C. elongata

Binomial name
- Chimarocephala elongata Rentz, 1977

Species of grasshopper

Chimarocephala elongata is a species of band-winged grasshopper in the family Acrididae. It is found in North America.
