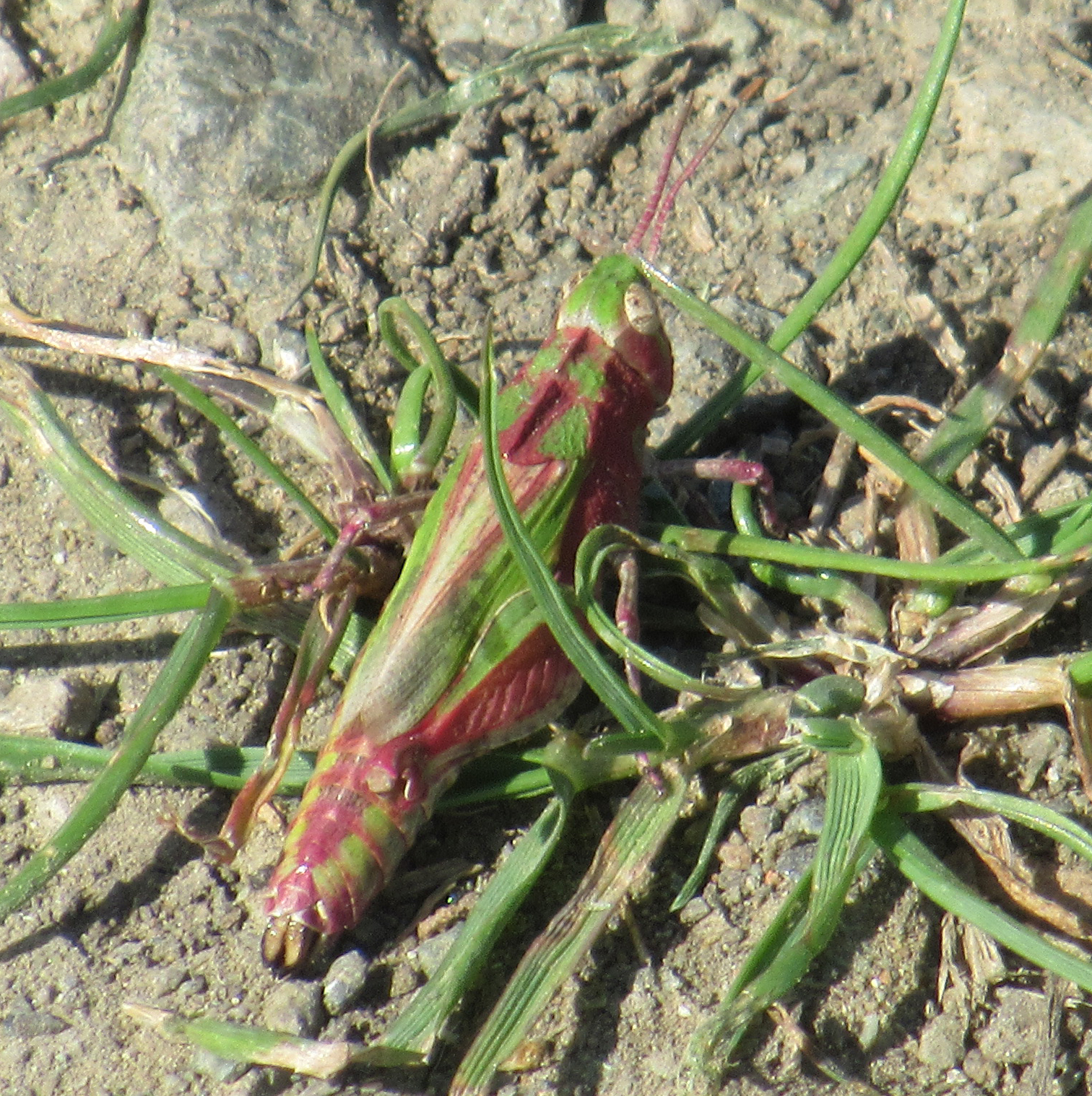
- Chimarocephala pacifica

Scientific classification
- Domain: Eukaryota
- Kingdom: Animalia
- Phylum: Arthropoda
- Class: Insecta
- Order: Orthoptera
- Suborder: Caelifera
- Family: Acrididae
- Subfamily: Oedipodinae
- Tribe: Chortophagini
- Genus: Chimarocephala; Scudder, 1875

= Chimarocephala =

Genus of grasshoppers

Chimarocephala is a genus of band-winged grasshoppers in the family Acrididae. There are at least three described species in Chimarocephala.

== Species ==
These three species belong to the genus Chimarocephala:

- Chimarocephala californica (Bruner, L., 1905) (California clouded grasshopper)
- Chimarocephala elongata Rentz, 1977
- Chimarocephala pacifica (Thomas, 1873) (painted meadow grasshopper)
