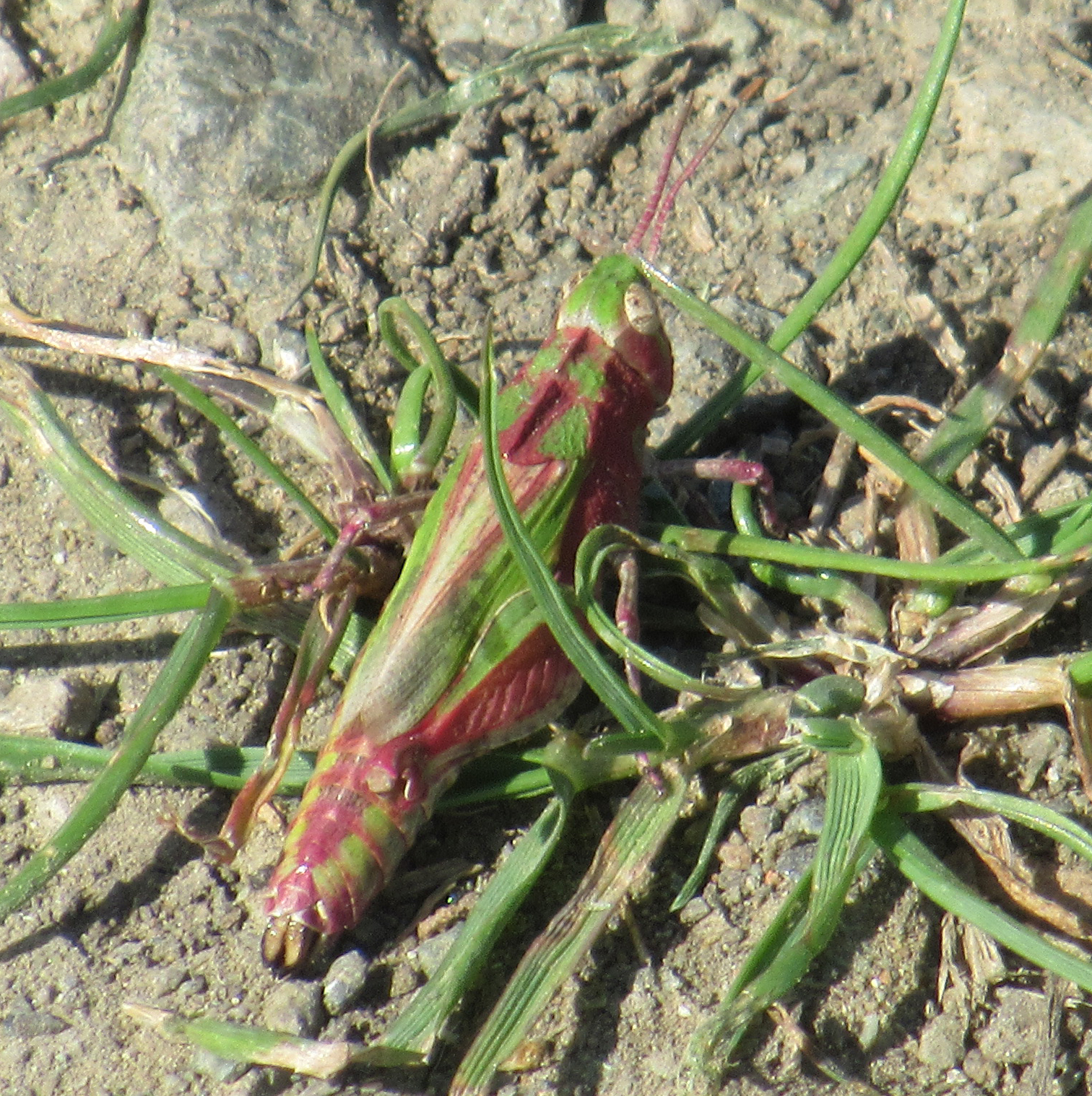

Scientific classification
- Domain: Eukaryota
- Kingdom: Animalia
- Phylum: Arthropoda
- Class: Insecta
- Order: Orthoptera
- Suborder: Caelifera
- Family: Acrididae
- Tribe: Chortophagini
- Genus: Chimarocephala
- Species: C. pacifica

Binomial name
- Chimarocephala pacifica (Thomas, 1873)

= Chimarocephala pacifica =

Species of grasshopper

Chimarocephala pacifica, known generally as the painted meadow grasshopper or painted grasshopper, is a species of band-winged grasshopper in the family Acrididae. It is found in Central America and North America.

== Subspecies ==
These two subspecies belong to the species Chimarocephala pacifica:

- Chimarocephala pacifica incisa
- Chimarocephala pacifica pacifica
