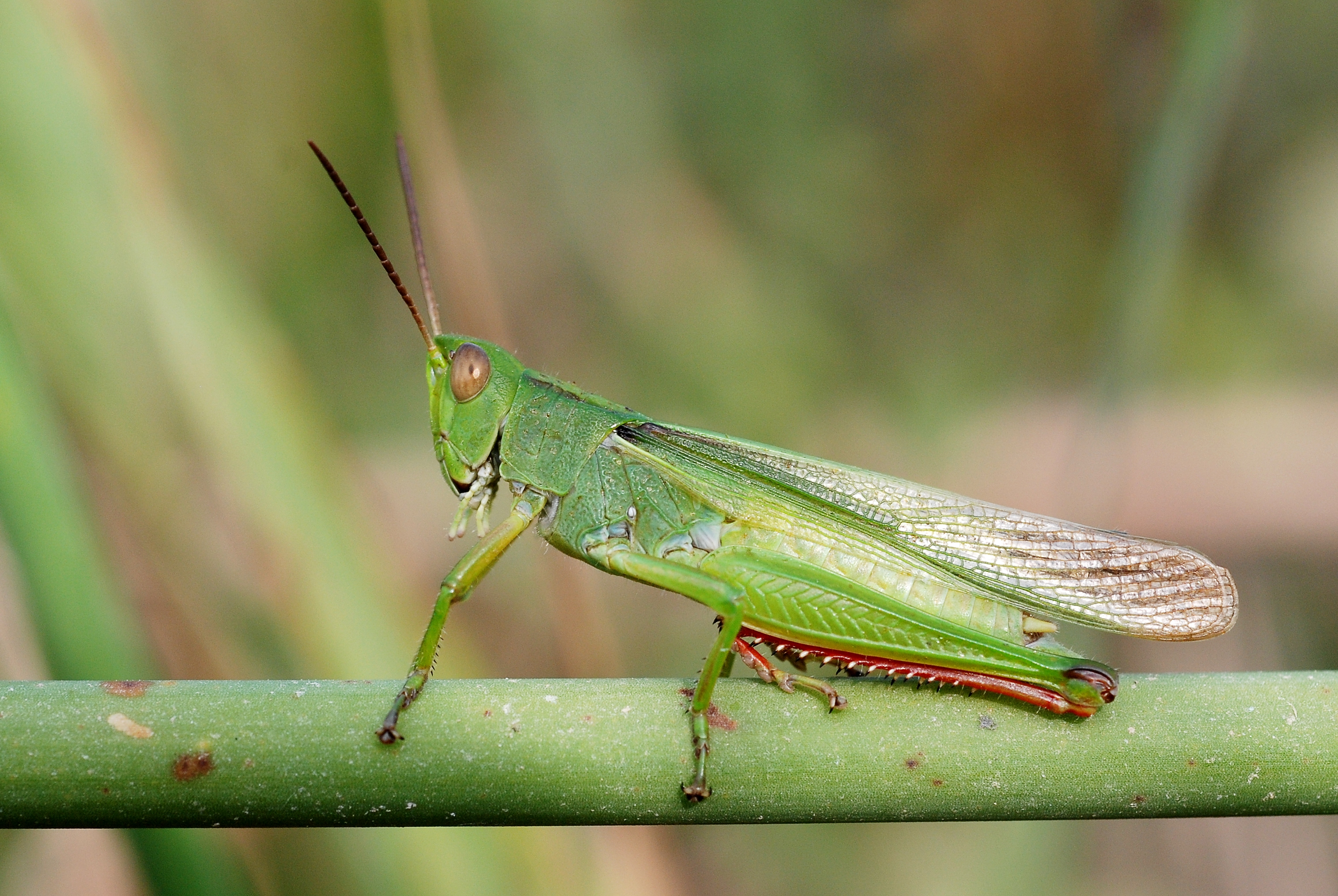
- Paracinema tricolor, France

Scientific classification
- Domain: Eukaryota
- Kingdom: Animalia
- Phylum: Arthropoda
- Class: Insecta
- Order: Orthoptera
- Suborder: Caelifera
- Family: Acrididae
- Subfamily: Oedipodinae
- Tribe: Epacromiini
- Genus: Paracinema
- Species: P. tricolor

Binomial name
- Paracinema tricolor (Thunberg, 1815)

= Paracinema tricolor =

Species of grasshopper

Paracinema tricolor is a species of band-winged grasshopper in the family Acrididae. It is found in Africa, Europe, and the Middle East.

== Subspecies ==
These subspecies belong to the species Paracinema tricolor:

- Paracinema tricolor arabica Uvarov, 1952
- Paracinema tricolor bisignata (Charpentier, 1825)
- Paracinema tricolor bisignatum (Charpentier, 1825)
- Paracinema tricolor tricolor (Thunberg, 1815) (Vlei Grasshopper)
