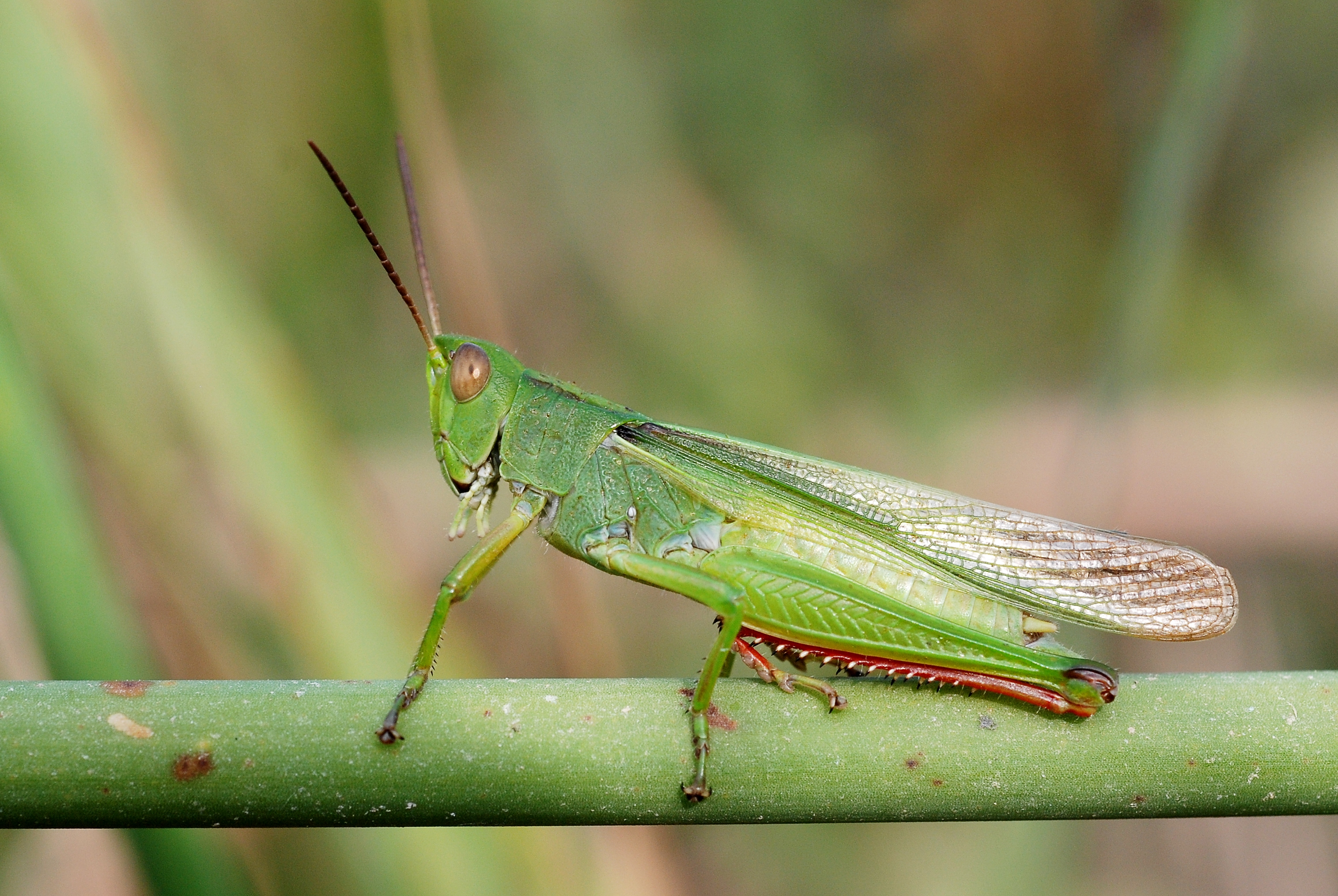
- Paracinema tricolor, France

Scientific classification
- Domain: Eukaryota
- Kingdom: Animalia
- Phylum: Arthropoda
- Class: Insecta
- Order: Orthoptera
- Suborder: Caelifera
- Family: Acrididae
- Subfamily: Oedipodinae
- Tribe: Epacromiini
- Genus: Paracinema; Fischer, 1853

Synonyms
- Paracimena Riggio, 1889

= Paracinema (insect) =

Genus of grasshoppers

Paracinema is a genus of band-winged grasshoppers in the tribe Epacromiini. There are at least three described species in Paracinema, from Africa, mainland Europe through to the Middle East.

== Species ==
These species belong to the genus Paracinema:

1. Paracinema acutipennis (Bolívar, 1914)
2. Paracinema luculenta Karsch, 1896
3. Paracinema tricolor (Thunberg, 1815) - type species: as Gryllus bisignatus Charpentier (= P. tricolor bisignatum, one of 3 subspecies)

== See also ==
- List of Orthopteroid genera containing species recorded in Europe
