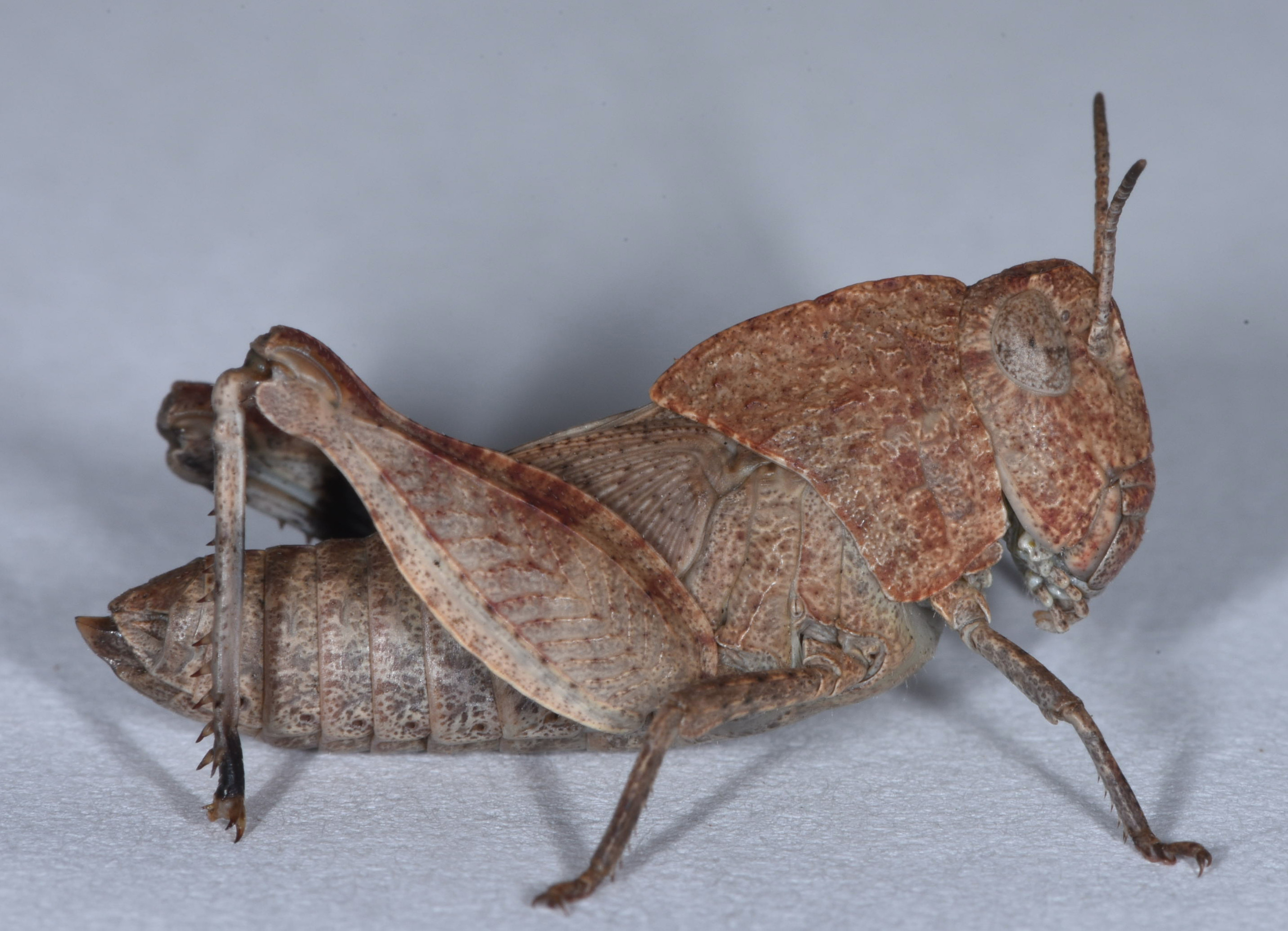
- Agymnastus ingens

Scientific classification
- Kingdom: Animalia
- Phylum: Arthropoda
- Clade: Pancrustacea
- Class: Insecta
- Order: Orthoptera
- Suborder: Caelifera
- Family: Acrididae
- Subfamily: Oedipodinae
- Tribe: Hippiscini
- Genus: Agymnastus; Scudder, 1897

= Agymnastus =

Genus of grasshoppers

Agymnastus is a genus of band-winged grasshoppers in the family Acrididae. There are at least 2 described species in Agymnastus.

== Species ==
- Agymnastus ingens (Scudder, 1877) (lubberly band-winged grasshopper)
- Agymnastus venerabilis Rentz, 1978
