= Agymnastus venerabilis =

Scientific classification
- Domain: Eukaryota
- Kingdom: Animalia
- Phylum: Arthropoda
- Class: Insecta
- Order: Orthoptera
- Suborder: Caelifera
- Family: Acrididae
- Genus: Agymnastus
- Species: A. venerabilis

Binomial name
- Agymnastus venerabilis Rentz, 1978

Species of grasshopper

Agymnastus venerabilis is a species of band-winged grasshopper in the family Acrididae. It is found in North America.
