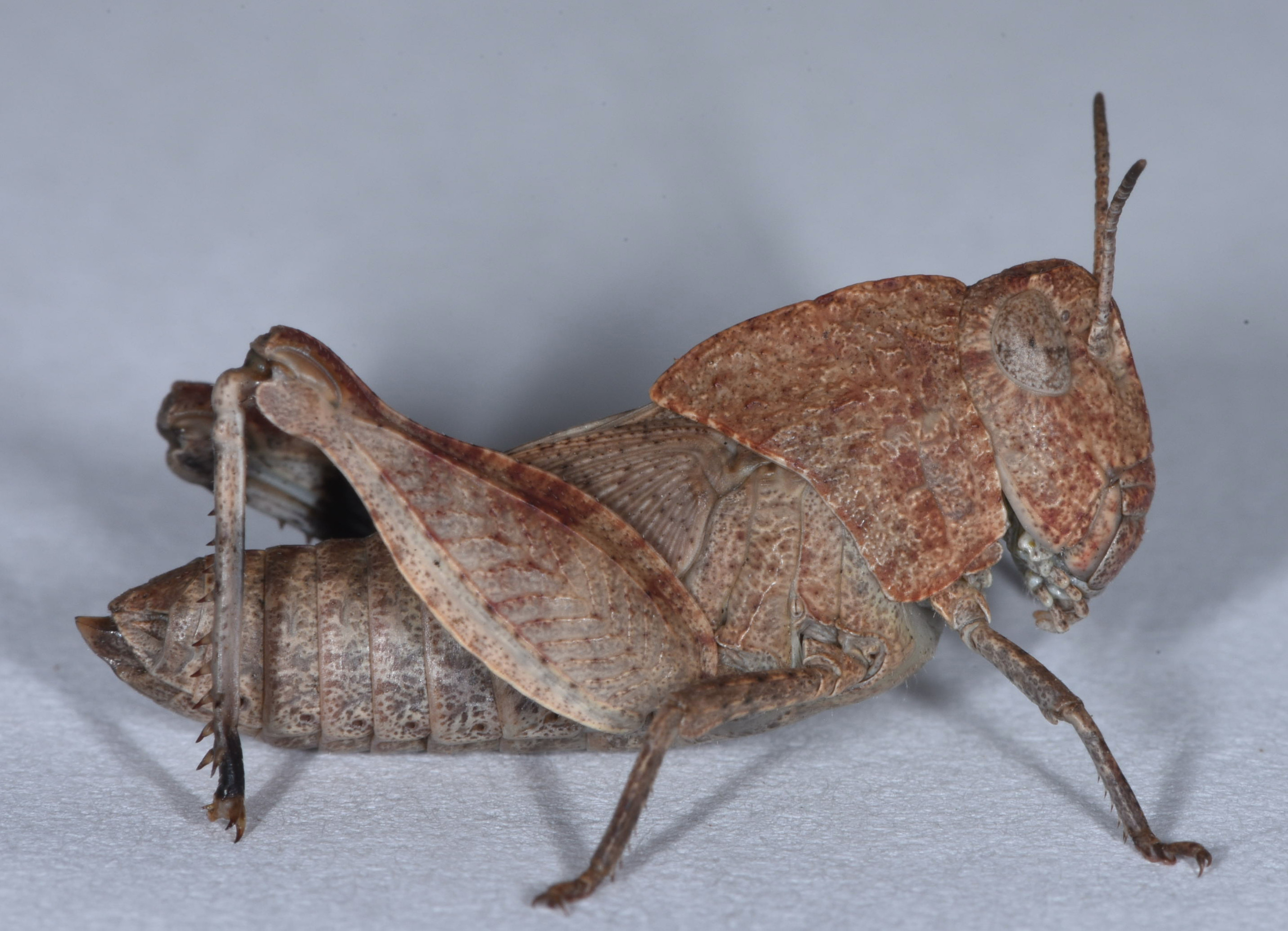

Scientific classification
- Domain: Eukaryota
- Kingdom: Animalia
- Phylum: Arthropoda
- Class: Insecta
- Order: Orthoptera
- Suborder: Caelifera
- Family: Acrididae
- Tribe: Hippiscini
- Genus: Agymnastus
- Species: A. ingens

Binomial name
- Agymnastus ingens (Scudder, 1877)

= Agymnastus ingens =

Species of grasshopper

Agymnastus ingens, the lubberly band-winged grasshopper, is a species of band-winged grasshopper in the family Acrididae. It is found in North America. Females are flightless. .
