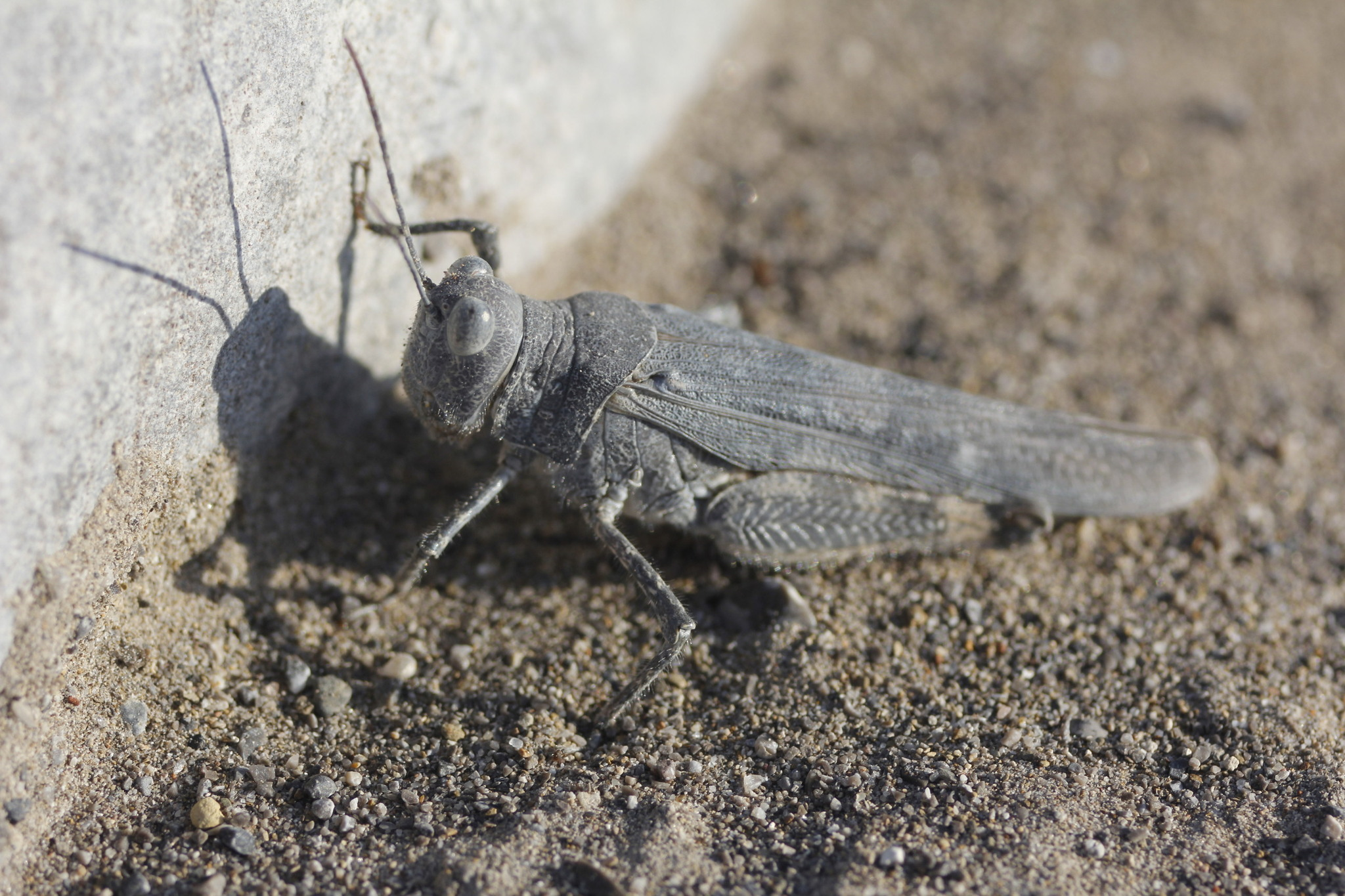

Scientific classification
- Domain: Eukaryota
- Kingdom: Animalia
- Phylum: Arthropoda
- Class: Insecta
- Order: Orthoptera
- Suborder: Caelifera
- Family: Acrididae
- Tribe: Arphiini
- Genus: Lactista
- Species: L. azteca

Binomial name
- Lactista azteca (Saussure, 1861)

= Lactista azteca =

Species of grasshopper

Lactista azteca, commonly known as the Aztec grasshopper or Aztec range grasshopper, is a species of band-winged grasshopper in the family Acrididae. It is found in Central America and North America.
