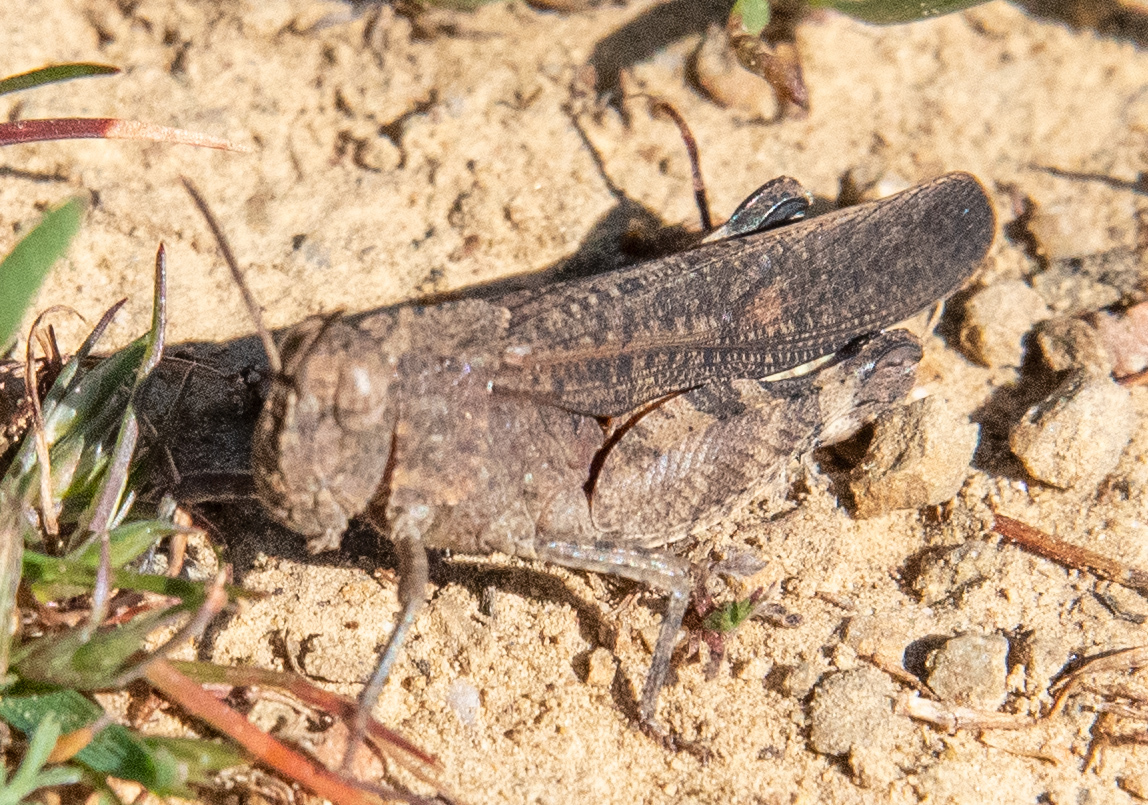
- Lactista gibbosus, trailside grasshopper, California, USA

Scientific classification
- Kingdom: Animalia
- Phylum: Arthropoda
- Clade: Pancrustacea
- Class: Insecta
- Order: Orthoptera
- Suborder: Caelifera
- Family: Acrididae
- Subfamily: Oedipodinae
- Tribe: Arphiini
- Genus: Lactista
- Species: L. gibbosus

Binomial name
- Lactista gibbosus Saussure, 1884

= Lactista gibbosus =

Species of band-winged grasshopper

Lactista gibbosus, the trailside grasshopper, is a species of band-winged grasshopper in the family Acrididae.
