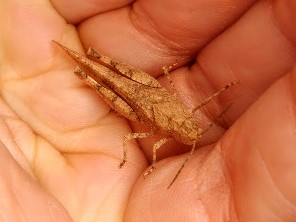
- Lactista stramineus

Scientific classification
- Domain: Eukaryota
- Kingdom: Animalia
- Phylum: Arthropoda
- Class: Insecta
- Order: Orthoptera
- Suborder: Caelifera
- Family: Acrididae
- Subfamily: Oedipodinae
- Tribe: Arphiini
- Genus: Lactista; Saussure, 1884

= Lactista =

Genus of grasshoppers

Lactista is a genus of band-winged grasshoppers in the family Acrididae. There are about 10 described species in Lactista.

== Species ==
These 10 species belong to the genus Lactista:

- Lactista azteca (Saussure, 1861) (Aztec grasshopper)
- Lactista elota Otte, 1984
- Lactista eustatia Bland, 2002
- Lactista gibbosus Saussure, 1884 (trailside grasshopper)
- Lactista humilis Hebard, 1932
- Lactista inermus Rehn, 1900
- Lactista micrus (Hebard, 1932)
- Lactista pellepidus Saussure, 1884
- Lactista punctatus (Stål, 1873)
- Lactista stramineus (Erichson, 1848)
