= Mestobregma =

Scientific classification
- Domain: Eukaryota
- Kingdom: Animalia
- Phylum: Arthropoda
- Class: Insecta
- Order: Orthoptera
- Suborder: Caelifera
- Family: Acrididae
- Subfamily: Oedipodinae
- Tribe: Psinidiini
- Genus: Mestobregma; Scudder, 1876

Genus of grasshoppers

Mestobregma is a genus of band-winged grasshoppers in the family Acrididae. There are at least three described species in Mestobregma.

== Species ==
These three species belong to the genus Mestobregma:

- Mestobregma impexum Rehn, 1919 (narrow-fronted grasshopper)
- Mestobregma plattei (Thomas, 1873) (Platte range grasshopper)
- Mestobregma terricolor Rehn, 1919 (dirt-colored grasshopper)
