= Mestobregma impexum =

Scientific classification
- Domain: Eukaryota
- Kingdom: Animalia
- Phylum: Arthropoda
- Class: Insecta
- Order: Orthoptera
- Suborder: Caelifera
- Family: Acrididae
- Tribe: Psinidiini
- Genus: Mestobregma
- Species: M. impexum

Binomial name
- Mestobregma impexum Rehn, 1919

Species of grasshopper

Mestobregma impexum, the narrow-fronted grasshopper, is a species of band-winged grasshopper in the family Acrididae. It is found in North America.
