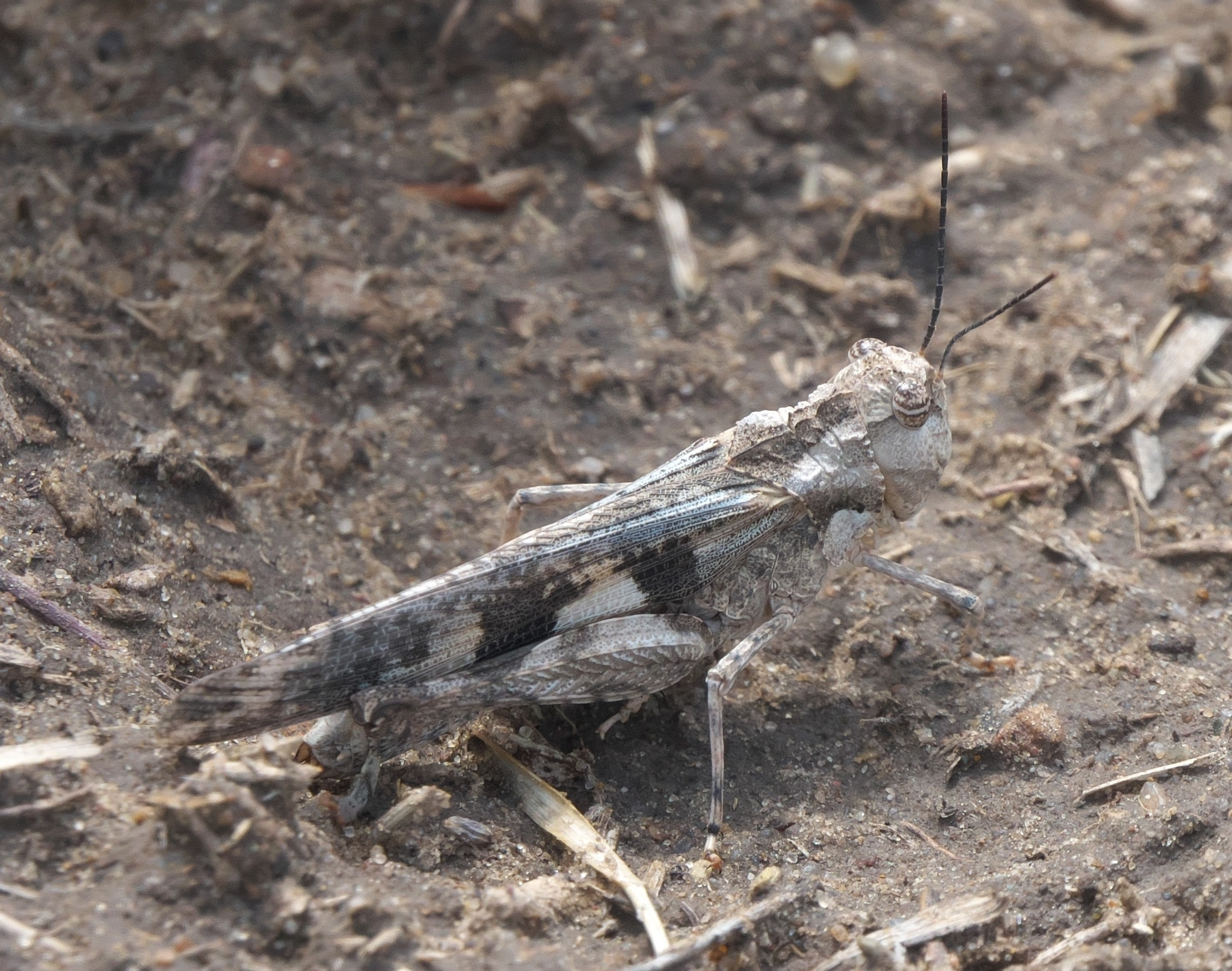
- Mestobregma plattei, Oklahoma

Scientific classification
- Domain: Eukaryota
- Kingdom: Animalia
- Phylum: Arthropoda
- Class: Insecta
- Order: Orthoptera
- Suborder: Caelifera
- Family: Acrididae
- Tribe: Psinidiini
- Genus: Mestobregma
- Species: M. plattei

Binomial name
- Mestobregma plattei (Thomas, 1873)

= Mestobregma plattei =

Species of grasshopper

Mestobregma plattei, the Platte range grasshopper, is a species of band-winged grasshopper in the family Acrididae. It is found in North America.
