= Mestobregma terricolor =

Scientific classification
- Domain: Eukaryota
- Kingdom: Animalia
- Phylum: Arthropoda
- Class: Insecta
- Order: Orthoptera
- Suborder: Caelifera
- Family: Acrididae
- Genus: Mestobregma
- Species: M. terricolor

Binomial name
- Mestobregma terricolor Rehn, 1919

Species of grasshopper

Mestobregma terricolor, the dirt-colored grasshopper, is a species of band-winged grasshopper in the family Acrididae. It is found in North America.
