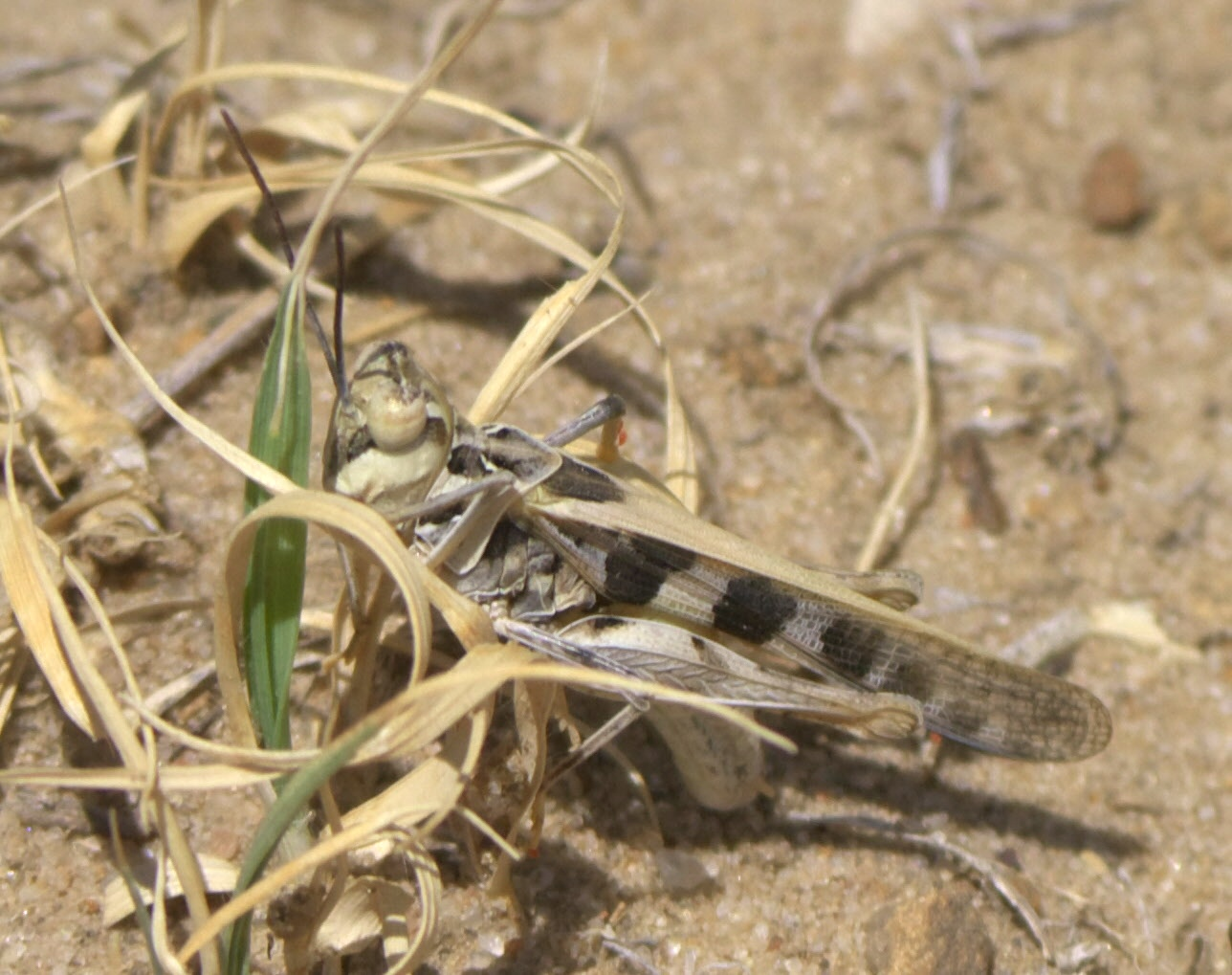
- Hippopedon capito, Oklahoma

Scientific classification
- Kingdom: Animalia
- Phylum: Arthropoda
- Clade: Pancrustacea
- Class: Insecta
- Order: Orthoptera
- Suborder: Caelifera
- Family: Acrididae
- Tribe: Psinidiini
- Genus: Hippopedon
- Species: H. capito

Binomial name
- Hippopedon capito (Stål, 1873)

= Hippopedon capito =

Species of grasshopper

Hippopedon capito, the Apache grasshopper, is a species of band-winged grasshopper in the family Acrididae. It is found in Central America and North America.
