= Hippopedon gracilipes =

Scientific classification
- Domain: Eukaryota
- Kingdom: Animalia
- Phylum: Arthropoda
- Class: Insecta
- Order: Orthoptera
- Suborder: Caelifera
- Family: Acrididae
- Tribe: Psinidiini
- Genus: Hippopedon
- Species: H. gracilipes

Binomial name
- Hippopedon gracilipes (Caudell, 1905)

Species of grasshopper

Hippopedon gracilipes, or Rehn's slender grasshopper, is a species of band-winged grasshopper in the family Acrididae. It is found in Central America and North America.
