= Hippopedon =

Scientific classification
- Domain: Eukaryota
- Kingdom: Animalia
- Phylum: Arthropoda
- Class: Insecta
- Order: Orthoptera
- Suborder: Caelifera
- Family: Acrididae
- Subfamily: Oedipodinae
- Tribe: Psinidiini
- Genus: Hippopedon; Saussure, 1861

Genus of grasshoppers

Hippopedon is a genus of band-winged grasshoppers in the family Acrididae. There are at least three described species in Hippopedon.

== Species ==
These three species belong to the genus Hippopedon:

- Hippopedon capito (Stål, 1873) (Apache grasshopper)
- Hippopedon gracilipes (Caudell, 1905) (Rehn's slender grasshopper)
- Hippopedon saltator Saussure, 1861
