= Atympanum nigrofasciatum =

Scientific classification
- Kingdom: Animalia
- Phylum: Arthropoda
- Class: Insecta
- Order: Orthoptera
- Suborder: Caelifera
- Family: Acrididae
- Genus: Atympanum
- Species: A. nigrofasciatum

Binomial name
- Atympanum nigrofasciatum (Yin, 1984)

Species of grasshopper

Atympanum nigrofasciatum is an insect which belongs to the Acrididae family. The scientific name of this species was first published in 1984 by Yin.
