= Atympanum =

Scientific classification
- Domain: Eukaryota
- Kingdom: Animalia
- Phylum: Arthropoda
- Class: Insecta
- Order: Orthoptera
- Suborder: Caelifera
- Family: Acrididae
- Subfamily: Oedipodinae
- Genus: Atympanum; Yin, 1982

Genus of grasshopper

Atympanum is a genus of grasshoppers in the subfamily Oedipodinae, from China.

== Species ==
The Orthoptera Species File lists:

1. Atympanum antennatum Yin, 1984
2. Atympanum belonocercum (Liu, 1981)
3. Atympanum carinotum (Yin, 1979) type species (as Oreoptygonotus carinotus Yin)
4. Atympanum comainensis (Liu, 1981)
5. Atympanum gonggarensis Zheng & Chen, 1995
6. Atympanum nigrofasciatum Yin, 1984
