= Leuronotina =

Scientific classification
- Domain: Eukaryota
- Kingdom: Animalia
- Phylum: Arthropoda
- Class: Insecta
- Order: Orthoptera
- Suborder: Caelifera
- Family: Acrididae
- Subfamily: Oedipodinae
- Tribe: Arphiini
- Genus: Leuronotina; Hebard, 1932

Genus of grasshoppers

Leuronotina is a genus of band-winged grasshoppers in the family Acrididae. There are at least four described species in Leuronotina.

== Species ==
These four species belong to the genus Leuronotina:

- Leuronotina obesa Otte, 1984
- Leuronotina orizabae (Saussure, 1884)
- Leuronotina philorites Otte, 1984
- Leuronotina ritensis (Rehn, 1912) (lichen grasshopper)
