= Leuronotina ritensis =

Scientific classification
- Domain: Eukaryota
- Kingdom: Animalia
- Phylum: Arthropoda
- Class: Insecta
- Order: Orthoptera
- Suborder: Caelifera
- Family: Acrididae
- Tribe: Arphiini
- Genus: Leuronotina
- Species: L. ritensis

Binomial name
- Leuronotina ritensis (Rehn, 1912)

Species of grasshopper

Leuronotina ritensis, the lichen grasshopper, is a species of band-winged grasshopper in the family Acrididae. It is found in North America.
