= Acrodectes Peak =

Mountain in California, United States

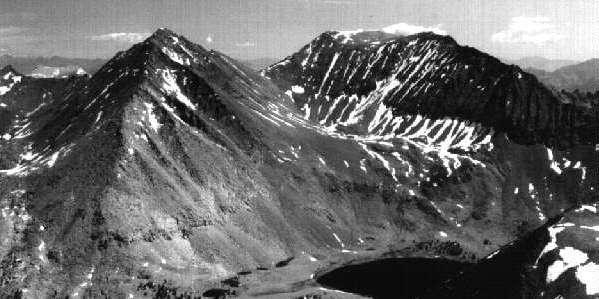
- Acrodectes Peak is on the left, viewed from the north

Highest point
- Elevation: 13,187 ft (4020 m) NAVD 88
- Prominence: 1,339 ft (408 m)
- Coordinates: 36°51′39″N 118°22′30″W

Geography
- Location within California
- Location: Fresno County, California
- Parent range: Sierra Nevada
- Topo map: USGS Kearsarge Peak

Climbing
- First ascent: 1935 by Norman Clyde and party
- Easiest route: Scramble, class 2

Acrodectes Peak is a mountain peak of the Sierra Nevada, located within Kings Canyon National Park in southern Fresno County, California.

The summit is 13,187 feet (4020 m) in elevation.

The peak was named after Acrodectes philopagus, a rare katydid species found in the region.

== See also ==
- Mountains of the Sierra Nevada (United States)
