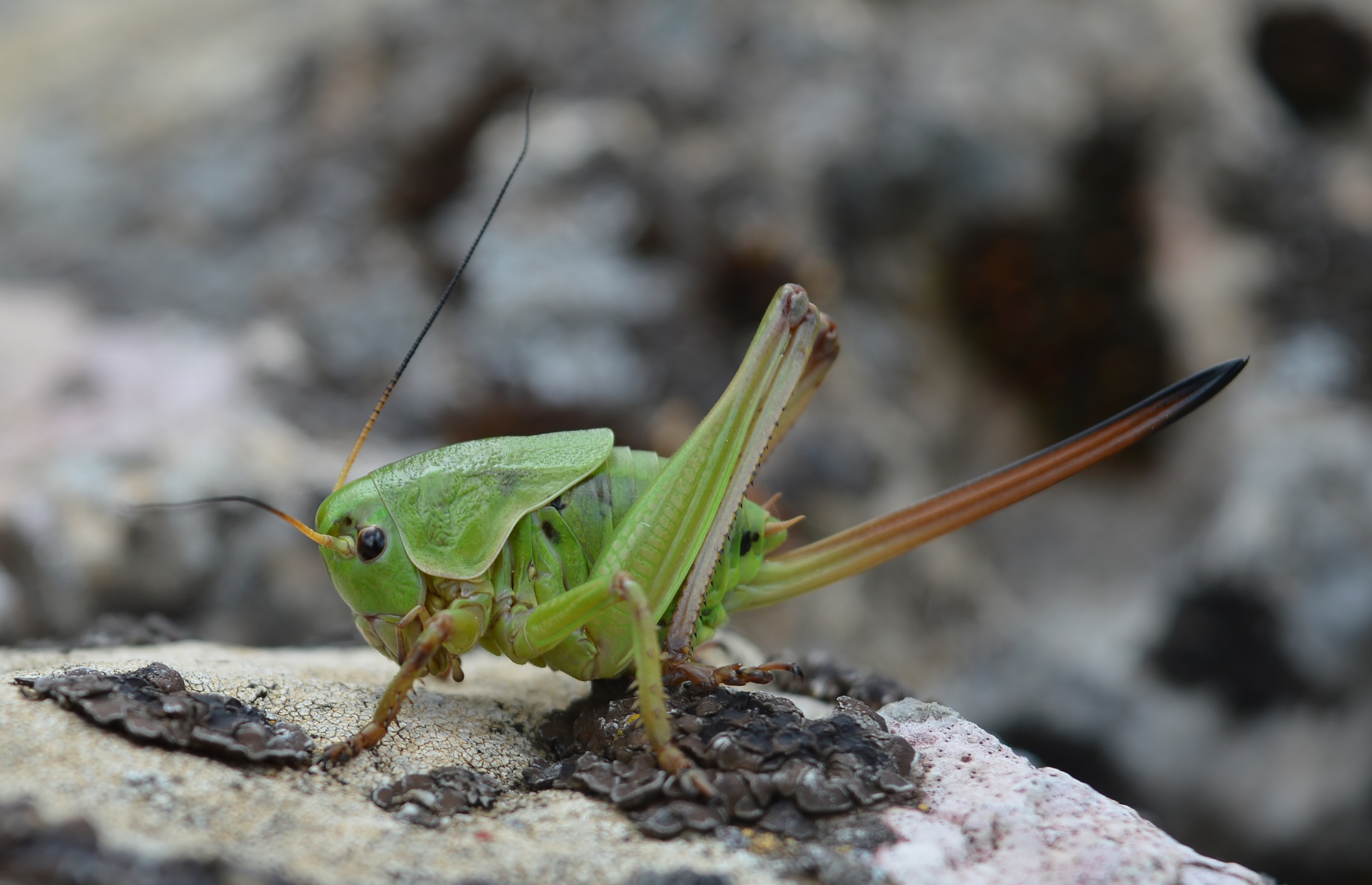
- P. fieberi subsp. macedonicus
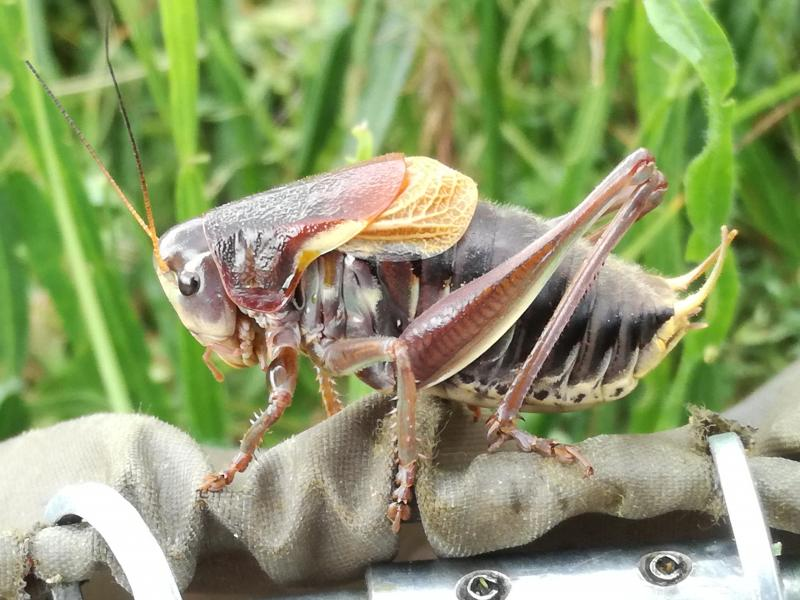
- P. fieberi male

Scientific classification
- Domain: Eukaryota
- Kingdom: Animalia
- Phylum: Arthropoda
- Class: Insecta
- Order: Orthoptera
- Suborder: Ensifera
- Family: Tettigoniidae
- Subfamily: Tettigoniinae
- Tribe: Pholidopterini
- Genus: Psorodonotus; Brunner von Wattenwyl, 1861

Synonyms
- Peltastes Fischer von Waldheim, 1839; Semenovites Tarbinsky, 1932

= Psorodonotus =

Genus of cricket-like animals

Psorodonotus is a genus of Palaearctic bush crickets in the tribe Pholidopterini, erected by Carl Brunner von Wattenwyl in 1861.

Species in this genus inhabit humid montane meadows from south-eastern Europe to central Asia (distribution probably incomplete).

== Species ==
The Orthoptera Species File lists:

species group caucasicus (Fischer von Waldheim, 1846)

1. Psorodonotus anatolicus Karabag, 1952
2. Psorodonotus caucasicus (Fischer von Waldheim, 1846)
3. Psorodonotus ebneri Karabag, 1952
4. Psorodonotus fieberi (Frivaldszky, 1853) - type species (as Pterolepis fieberi Frivaldszky, by subsequent designation)
5. Psorodonotus illyricus Ebner, 1923
6. Psorodonotus macedonicus Ramme, 1931
7. Psorodonotus salmani Ünal, 2013
8. Psorodonotus suphani Taylan & Sirin, 2014

species group specularis (Fischer von Waldheim, 1839)

1. Psorodonotus davisi Karabag, 1957
2. Psorodonotus giresun Kaya & Çiplak, 2014
3. Psorodonotus inflatus Uvarov, 1912
4. Psorodonotus soganli Ünal, 2013
5. Psorodonotus specularis (Fischer von Waldheim, 1839)

species group venosus (Fischer von Waldheim, 1839)

1. Psorodonotus hakkari Kaya, Korkmaz & Çiplak, 2013
2. Psorodonotus rugulosus Karabag, 1952
3. Psorodonotus tendurek Kaya, Korkmaz & Çiplak, 2013
4. Psorodonotus venosus (Fischer von Waldheim, 1839)
