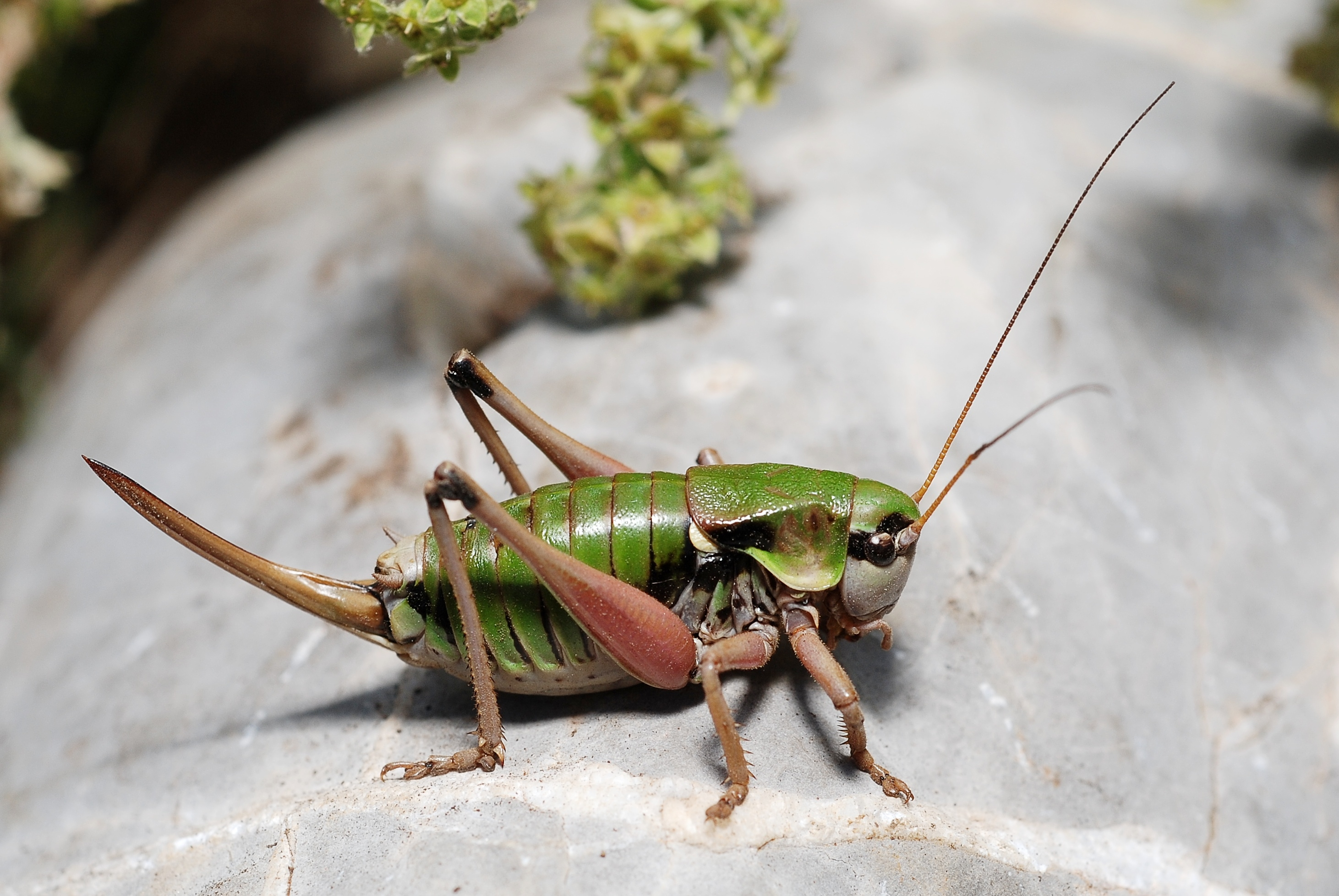
- Anonconotus alpinus female
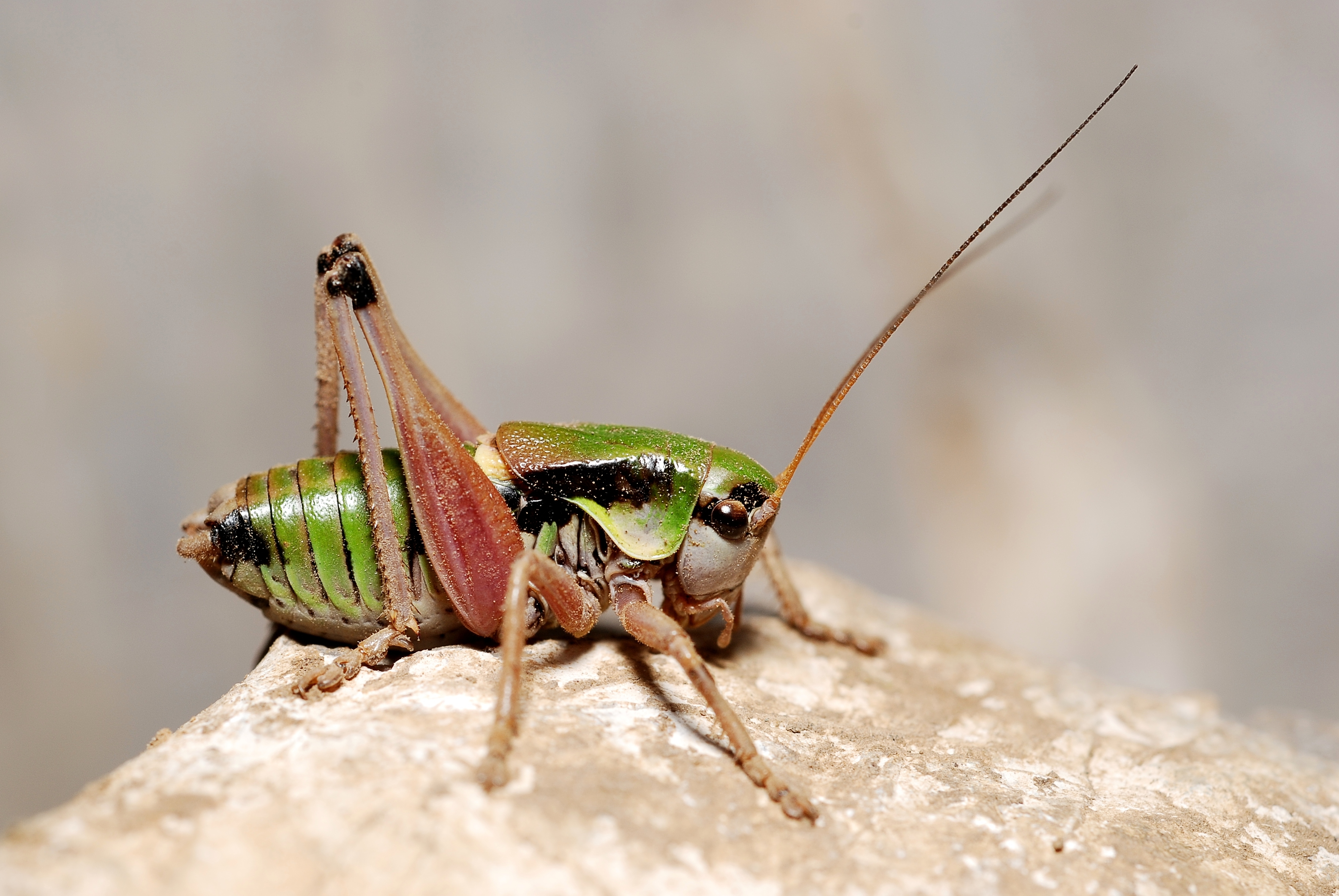
- A. alpinus male

Scientific classification
- Domain: Eukaryota
- Kingdom: Animalia
- Phylum: Arthropoda
- Class: Insecta
- Order: Orthoptera
- Suborder: Ensifera
- Family: Tettigoniidae
- Subfamily: Tettigoniinae
- Tribe: Platycleidini
- Genus: Anonconotus; Camerano, 1878

Synonyms
- Analota Brunner von Wattenwyl, 1882; Anatola Brunner von Wattenwyl, 1893; Omalota Targioni-Tozzetti, 1881

= Anonconotus =

Genus of cricket-like animals

Anonconotus is a genus of Palaearctic bush crickets in the tribe Platycleidini, erected by L. Camerano in 1878. Species may be called "Alpine bush crickets" and can be found in mainland western Europe, with most records from France through to Austria and Italy.

== Species ==
The Orthoptera Species File lists the following accepted species:

1. Anonconotus alpinus (Yersin, 1858)
2. Anonconotus apenninigenus (Targioni-Tozzetti, 1881)
3. Anonconotus baracunensis Nadig, 1987
4. Anonconotus ghilianii Camerano, 1878 - type species
5. Anonconotus italoaustriacus Nadig, 1987
6. Anonconotus ligustinus Galvagni, 2002
7. Anonconotus mercantouri Galvagni & Fontana, 2003
8. Anonconotus occidentalis Carron & Wermeille, 2002
9. Anonconotus pusillus Carron & Sardet, 2002
10. Anonconotus sibyllinus Galvagni, 2002
