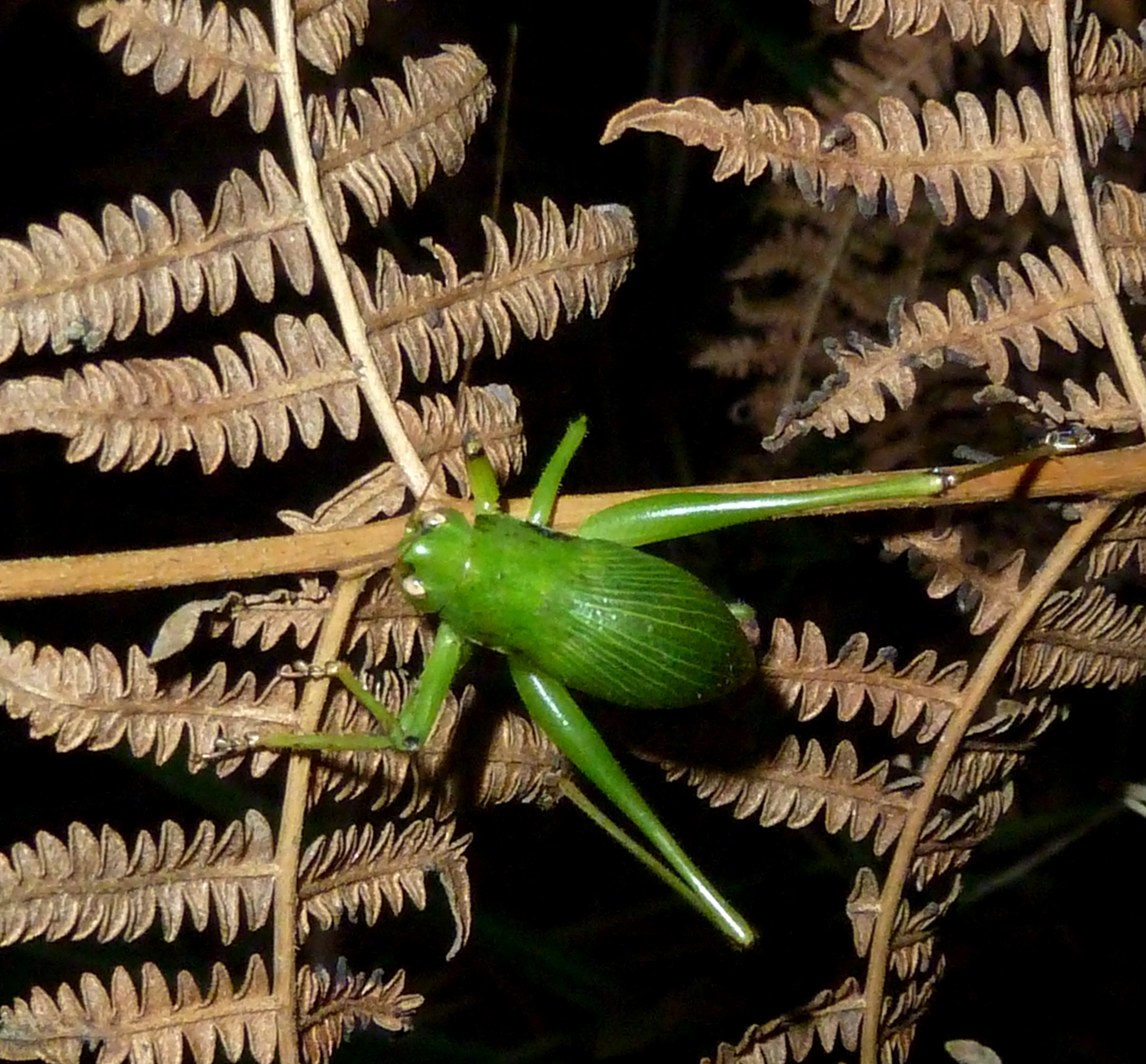
- Thoracistus sp., male in mid-winter, calling at dusk from a marsh edge

Scientific classification
- Kingdom: Animalia
- Phylum: Arthropoda
- Clade: Pancrustacea
- Class: Insecta
- Order: Orthoptera
- Suborder: Ensifera
- Family: Tettigoniidae
- Subfamily: Tettigoniinae
- Tribe: Arytropteridini
- Genus: Thoracistus; Pictet, 1888

= Thoracistus =

Genus of cricket-like animals

Thoracistus is a genus of decticine or shield-backed katydids in the family Tettigoniidae. The mostly carnivorous genus is endemic to South Africa.

== Morphology ==
This genus of decticine is extreme in the extent of its inflated pronotum. The pronotum completely conceals the tiny wings, which are used for stridulation only. The pronotum functions as a resonating chamber, to amplify the singing of the male. As in all decticines a "free plantula" is found at the base of the tarsus of the jumping leg. This pair of elongate pads may aid jumping in ground biomes.

== Biology ==
They are bush or ground-dwelling insects, but unlike the majority of decticines, occur in mesic rather than xeric habitats. They hide by day in thickets, and become active at dusk when they ascend plants to feed on smaller insects. After dark males call to the females, which are silent. The sound of a male chorus can carry some distance. The eggs hatch from late spring to early summer. They reach adulthood from late summer to fall.

== Species ==
Species include:

- Thoracistus arboreus
- Thoracistus aureoportalis
- Thoracistus jambila
- Thoracistus peringueyi
- Thoracistus semeniphagus
- Thoracistus thyraeus
- Thoracistus viridicrus
- Thoracistus viridifer
