= Ctenodecticus =

Scientific classification
- Domain: Eukaryota
- Kingdom: Animalia
- Phylum: Arthropoda
- Class: Insecta
- Order: Orthoptera
- Suborder: Ensifera
- Family: Tettigoniidae
- Subfamily: Tettigoniinae
- Tribe: Ctenodecticini
- Genus: Ctenodecticus; Bolívar, 1877

Synonyms
- Hemictenodecticus Caudell, 1908

Genus of cricket-like animals

External image
- Images at iNaturalist

Ctenodecticus is a genus of bush crickets erected by erected by Ignacio Bolívar in 1877; it is the type genus of the small tribe Ctenodecticini. Species have been recorded from the Iberian Peninsula, Sardinia, Sicily and North Africa.

== Species ==
The Orthoptera Species File lists:

1. Ctenodecticus algericus (Uvarov, 1924)
2. Ctenodecticus bolivari Targioni-Tozzetti, 1881 (2 subspecies)
3. Ctenodecticus granatensis Pascual, 1978
4. Ctenodecticus lusitanicus Barranco & Pascual, 1992
5. Ctenodecticus major Pascual, 1978
6. Ctenodecticus masferreri Bolívar, 1894
7. Ctenodecticus pupulus Bolívar, 1877 - type species
8. Ctenodecticus ramburi Morales-Agacino, 1956
9. Ctenodecticus siculus Ramme, 1927
10. Ctenodecticus thymi Olmo-Vidal, 1999
11. Ctenodecticus vasarensis Finot, 1893
