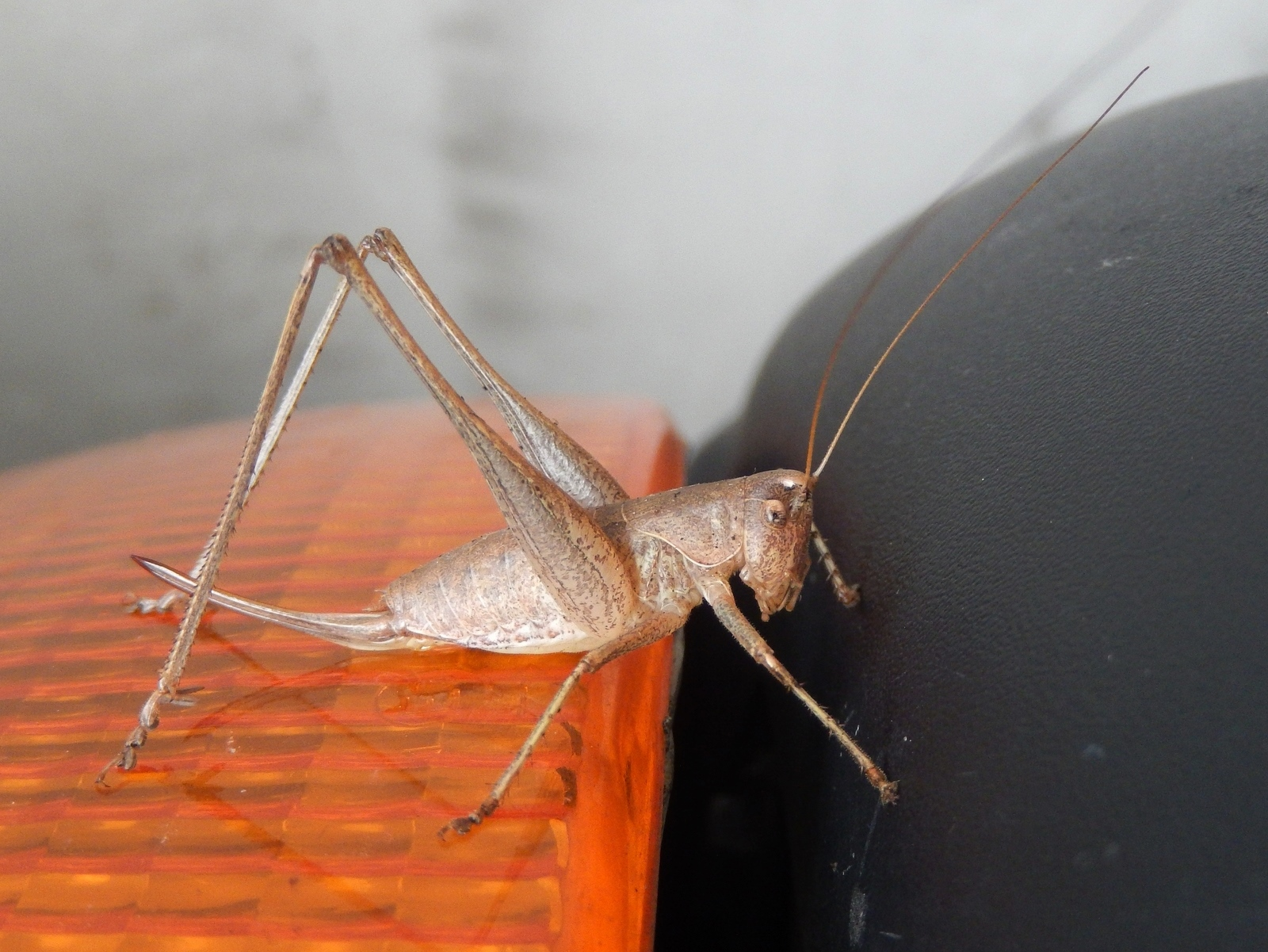
- Rhacocleis cf. neglecta

Scientific classification
- Domain: Eukaryota
- Kingdom: Animalia
- Phylum: Arthropoda
- Class: Insecta
- Order: Orthoptera
- Suborder: Ensifera
- Family: Tettigoniidae
- Subfamily: Tettigoniinae
- Tribe: Platycleidini
- Genus: Rhacocleis; Fieber, 1853

= Rhacocleis =

Genus of cricket-like animals

Rhacocleis is a genus of bush crickets in the subfamily Tettigoniinae and tribe Platycleidini. Species can be found in southern Europe, the Middle East and North Africa.

== Species ==
The Orthoptera Species File lists:

1. Rhacocleis acutangula Karabag, 1957
2. Rhacocleis agiostratica Werner, 1937
3. Rhacocleis anatolica Werner, 1933
4. Rhacocleis andikithirensis Tilmans, Odé & Willemse, 2016
5. Rhacocleis annulata Fieber, 1853 - type species (as R. annulatus Fieber)
6. Rhacocleis ayali Karabag, 1974
7. Rhacocleis baccettii Galvagni, 1976
8. Rhacocleis bonfilsi Galvagni, 1976
9. Rhacocleis buchichii Herman, 1874 - Lesina Bush-cricket
10. Rhacocleis corsicana Bonfils, 1960
11. Rhacocleis crypta Willemse & Willemse, 2005
12. Rhacocleis dernensis Salfi, 1926
13. Rhacocleis derrai Harz, 1983
14. Rhacocleis distinguenda Werner, 1934
15. Rhacocleis edentata Willemse, 1982
16. Rhacocleis ferdinandi Willemse & Tilmans, 1987
17. Rhacocleis germanica (Herrich-Schäffer, 1840)
18. Rhacocleis graeca Uvarov, 1942
19. Rhacocleis insularis Ramme, 1928
20. Rhacocleis japygia La Greca, 1959
21. Rhacocleis lithoscirtetes Willemse & Willemse, 2005
22. Rhacocleis maculipedes (Ingrisch, 1983)
23. Rhacocleis neglecta (Costa, 1863)
24. Rhacocleis poneli Harz & Voisin, 1987
25. Rhacocleis ramburi (Serville, 1838)
26. Rhacocleis silvestrii Ramme, 1939
27. Rhacocleis silviarum Galvagni, 1984
28. Rhacocleis thyrrhenica La Greca, 1952
29. Rhacocleis trilobata La Greca & Messina, 1974
30. Rhacocleis tuberculata Karabag, 1978
31. Rhacocleis turcica (Uvarov, 1930)
32. Rhacocleis uvarovi Ramme, 1936
33. Rhacocleis werneri Willemse, 1982
