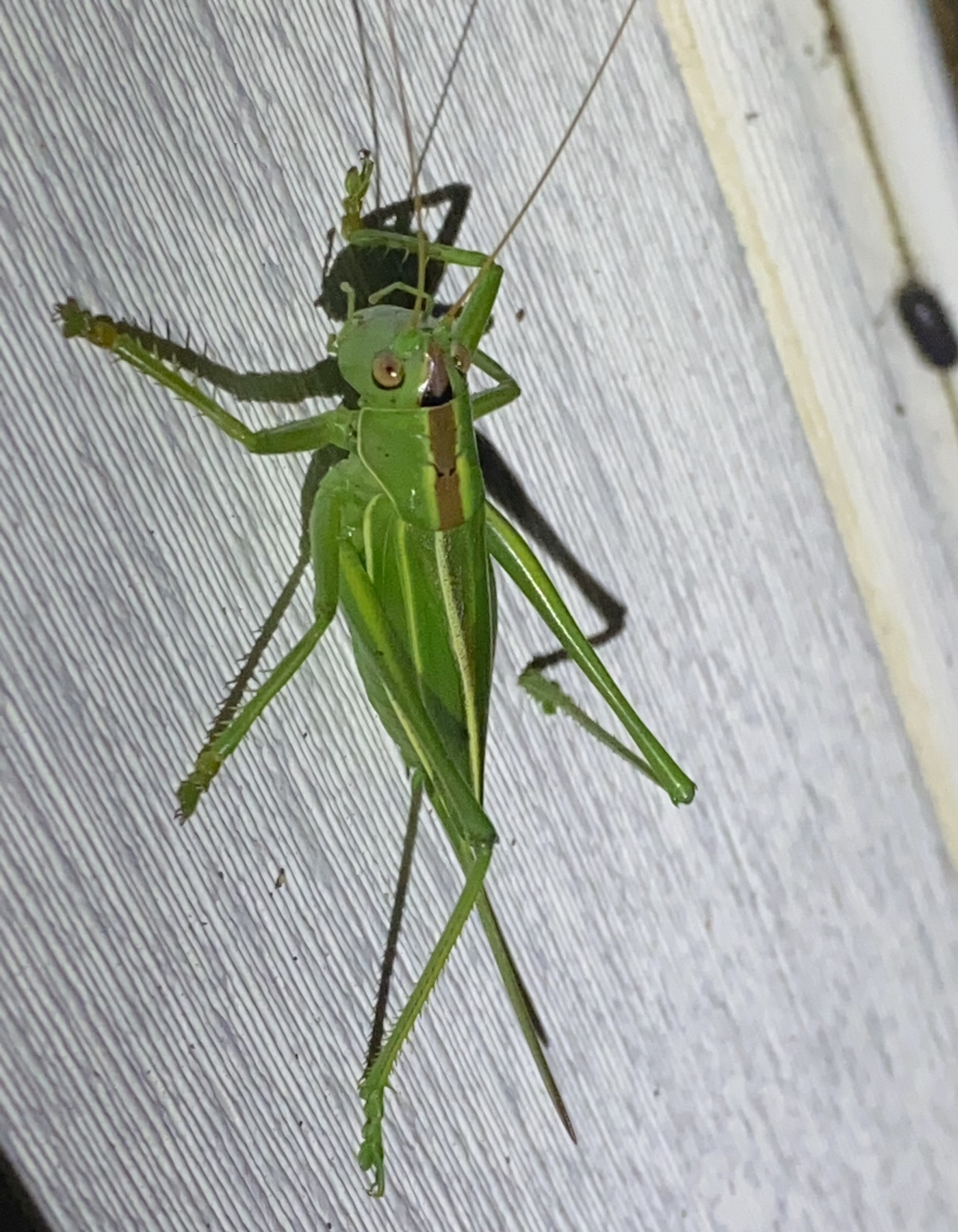
- Hubbellia marginifera

Scientific classification
- Kingdom: Animalia
- Phylum: Arthropoda
- Clade: Pancrustacea
- Class: Insecta
- Order: Orthoptera
- Suborder: Ensifera
- Family: Tettigoniidae
- Subfamily: Tettigoniinae
- Tribe: Tettigoniini
- Genus: Hubbellia; Hebard, 1927
- Species: H. marginifera

Binomial name
- Hubbellia marginifera (F. Walker, 1869)

= Hubbellia =

Genus of cricket-like animals

Hubbellia is a genus of shield-backed katydids in the family Tettigoniidae. There is one described species in Hubbellia, H. marginifera. It is one of the most rarely-seen species of katydids in the United States, and only around 40 specimens have been collected.

== Habitat ==
It lives in the canopies of pine trees.

== Distribution ==
This species lives in the southeastern US.
