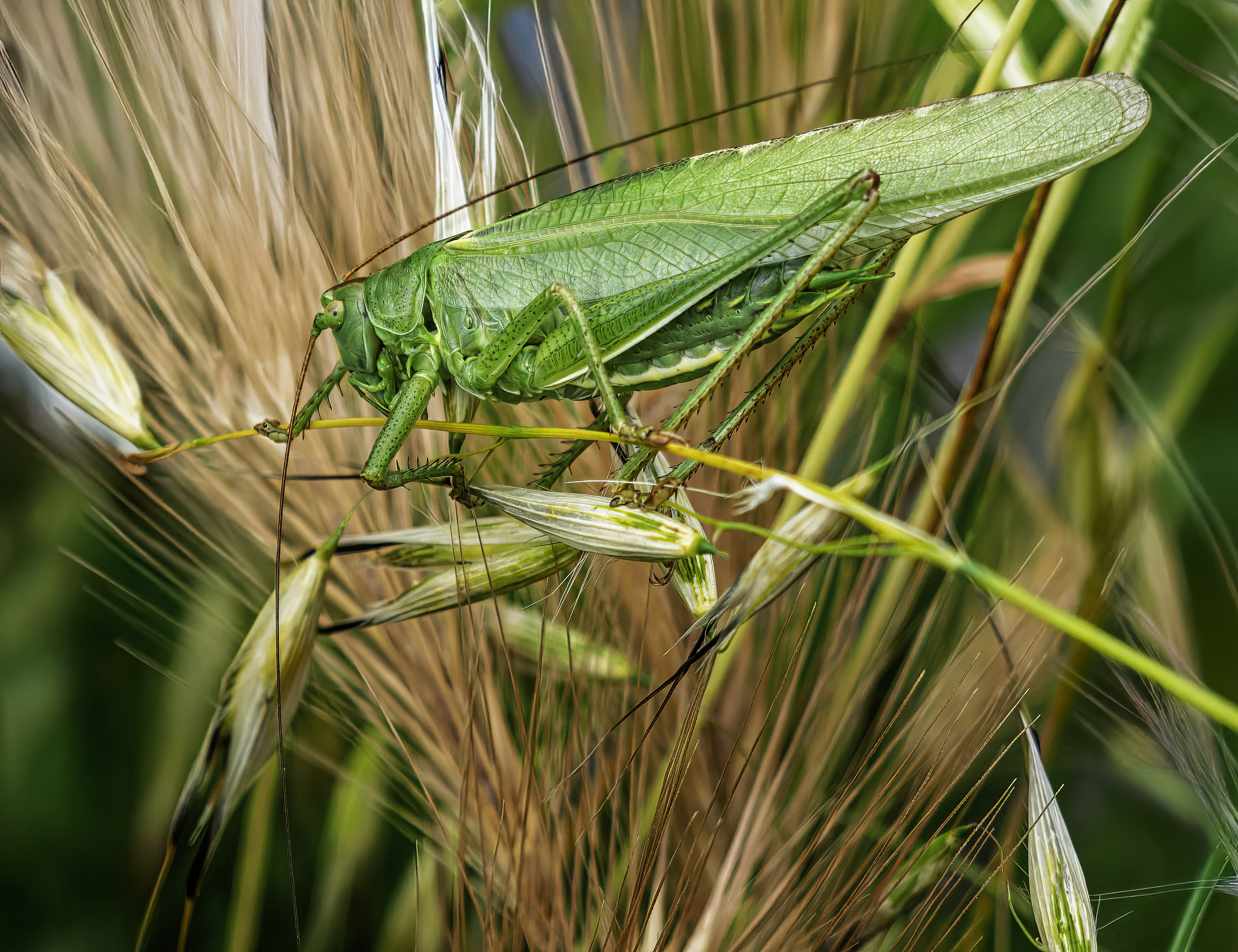
- Tettigonia viridissima: the great green bush-cricket

Scientific classification
- Kingdom: Animalia
- Phylum: Arthropoda
- Class: Insecta
- Order: Orthoptera
- Suborder: Ensifera
- Family: Tettigoniidae
- Subfamily: Tettigoniinae; Stoll, 1787

Tribes & genera
- See text

= Tettigoniinae =

Subfamily of cricket-like animals

The Tettigoniinae are a subfamily of bush crickets or katydids, which contains hundreds of species in about twelve tribes.

== Distribution ==
The greatest diversity is in the Palaearctic region and many of the familiar European species of bush crickets (e.g. in the genera Metrioptera, Pholidoptera, Platycleis and the type genus Tettigonia) are in this subfamily. They are attributed to an ancient Gondwana fauna, which is reflected in the known distribution of the southern African genera, which are in turn related to Australian and North American genera in the tribe Nedubini (e.g. Neduba and Aglaothorax). Extant genera are native to: the Americas (where they may be called shield-backed katydids), Australia, southern Africa, Europe (especially Mediterranean), and the Near East. The faunas of the Neotropics and Australia are more closely related to one other than to those of southern Africa and Madagascar (in tribe Arytropteridini), although the three faunas are related.

== Tribes and genera ==
In the Orthoptera Species File, the following are listed:

=== Arytropteridini ===
Auth. Caudell, 1908; distribution: Southern Africa

1. Alfredectes Rentz, 1988
2. Anarytropteris Uvarov, 1924
3. Arytropteris Herman, 1874
4. Ceresia Uvarov, 1928 - monotypic Ceresia pulchripes
5. Namaquadectes Rentz, 1988
6. Thoracistus Pictet, 1888
7. Toliaridectes Hugel, 2019
8. Transkeidectes Naskrecki, 1992
9. Zuludectes Rentz, 1988

=== Ctenodecticini ===
Auth. Caudell, 1908; distribution: Palaearctic

1. Ctenodecticus Bolívar, 1877
2. Miramiola Uvarov, 1939

=== Decticini ===
Auth. Herman, 1874 (synonyms Decticidae or Dectici Herman, 1874); distribution: Palaearctic

1. Decticus Serville, 1831

=== Drymadusini ===
Auth. Uvarov, 1924; distribution: Palaearctic, Nearctic

1. Afrodrymadusa Ramme, 1939
2. Ammoxenulus Bey-Bienko, 1951
3. Anadolua Ramme, 1939
4. Anadrymadusa Karabag, 1961
5. Anatlanticus Bey-Bienko, 1951
6. Atlanticus Scudder, 1894
7. Bergiola Stshelkanovtzev, 1910
8. Bienkoxenus Cejchan, 1968
9. Calopterusa Uvarov, 1942
10. Ceraeocercus Uvarov, 1910
11. Delodusa Stolyarov, 1994
12. Drymadusa Stein, 1860
13. Drymadusella Ramme, 1939
14. Drymapedes Bey-Bienko, 1967
15. Eulithoxenus Bey-Bienko, 1951
16. Exodrymadusa Karabag, 1961
17. Ferganusa Uvarov, 1926
18. Iranusa Uvarov, 1942
19. Kansua Uvarov, 1933
20. Leptodusa Stolyarov, 1994
21. Lithodusa Bey-Bienko, 1951
22. Lithoxenus Bey-Bienko, 1951
23. Microdrymadusa Bey-Bienko, 1967
24. Mixodusa Stolyarov, 1994
25. Mongolodectes Bey-Bienko, 1951
26. Novadrymadusa Demirsoy, Salman & Sevgili, 2002
27. Paradrymadusa Herman, 1874
28. Paratlanticus Ramme, 1939
29. Pezodrymadusa Karabag, 1961
30. Phytodrymadusa Ramme, 1939
31. Ptosoproctus Shen, Yin & He, 2021
32. Scotodrymadusa Ramme, 1939
33. Sichuana Yin & Shen, 2020
34. Tadzhikia Mistshenko, 1954
35. Uvarovina Ramme, 1939
36. Zagrosiella Mirzayans, 1991

=== Gampsocleidini ===
Auth. Brunner von Wattenwyl, 1893; distribution: Palaearctic

1. Gampsocleis Fieber, 1852
2. Uvarovites Tarbinsky, 1932 - monotypic U. inflatus (Uvarov, 1924) - mainland E. Asia

=== Glyphonotini ===
Auth. Tarbinsky, 1932 (synonyms: Glyphonotinae Tarbinsky, 1932; Glyphontini); distribution: Palaearctic, Australia

1. Calliphona Krauss, 1892
2. Chlorodectes Rentz, 1985
3. Ectopistidectes Rentz, 1985
4. Glyphonotus Redtenbacher, 1889
5. Metaballus Herman, 1874
6. Psalmatophanes Chopard, 1938

=== Nedubini ===
Auth. Gorochov, 1988; distribution: Americas, Australia

- Aglaothorax Caudell, 1907
- Antipodectes Rentz, 1985
- Apteropedetes Rentz, 1979
- Barraza Koçak & Kemal, 2008
- Chinnandectes Rentz, 1985
- Dexerra Walker, 1869
- Falcidectes Rentz & Gurney, 1985
- Glenbalodectes Rentz, 1985
- Idionotus Scudder, 1894
- Ixalodectes Rentz, 1985
- Lanciana Walker, 1869
- Neduba Walker, 1869
- Oligodectes Rentz, 1985
- Oligodectoides Rentz, 1985
- Phymonotus Lightfoot, Weissman & Ueshima, 2011
- Platydecticus Chopard, 1951
- Platyproctidectes Rentz, 1985
- Rhachidorus Herman, 1874
- Throscodectes Rentz, 1985
- Xederra Ander, 1938
- Xyrdectes Rentz & Gurney, 1985

=== Onconotini ===
Auth. Tarbinsky, 1940; distribution: Palaearctic

- Onconotus Fischer von Waldheim, 1839

=== Pholidopterini ===
Auth. Ramme, 1951; distribution: Palaearctic

1. Aparapholidoptera Çiplak, 2020
2. Apholidoptera Maran, 1953
3. Eupholidoptera Maran, 1953
4. Exopholidoptera Ünal, 1998
5. Parapholidoptera Maran, 1953
6. Pholidoptera Wesmaël, 1838
7. Psorodonotus Brunner von Wattenwyl, 1861
8. Spinopholidoptera Çiplak, 2020
9. Uvarovistia Maran, 1953

=== Plagiostirini ===
Auth. Storozhenko, 1994; distribution: Nearctic

- Plagiostira Scudder, 1876

=== Platycleidini ===
Auth. Brunner von Wattenwyl, 1893; distribution: Nearctic, Palaearctic, probably through to Australasia

- Afghanoptera Ramme, 1952
- Amedegnatiana Massa & Fontana, 2011
- Anabrus Haldeman, 1852
- Anonconotus Camerano, 1878
- Antaxius Brunner von Wattenwyl, 1882
- Anterastes Brunner von Wattenwyl, 1882
- Ariagona Krauss, 1892
- Austrodectes Rentz, 1985
- Bicolorana Zeuner, 1941
- Broughtonia Harz, 1969
- Bucephaloptera Ebner, 1923
- Chizuella Furukawa, 1950 - monotypic C. bonneti (Bolívar, 1890): E. Asia
- Clinopleura Scudder, 1894
- Decticita Hebard, 1939
- Decticoides Ragge, 1977
- Eobiana Bei-Bienko, 1949
- Eremopedes Scudder, 1897
- Festella Giglio-Tos, 1894
- Hermoniana Broza, Ayal & Pener, 2004
- Hypsopedes Bei-Bienko, 1951
- Idiostatus Pictet, 1888
- Incertana Zeuner, 1941
- Inyodectes Rentz & Birchim, 1968
- Koroglus - monotypic K. disparalatus Ünal, 2002
- Metrioptera Wesmaël, 1838: also a genus group
- Modestana Beier, 1955
- Montana Zeuner, 1941
- Pachytrachis Uvarov, 1940
- Parnassiana Zeuner, 1941
- Pediodectes Rehn & Hebard, 1916
- Peranabrus Scudder, 1894
- Petropedes Tinkham, 1972
- Platycleis Fieber, 1853: also a genus group
- Plicigastra Uvarov, 1940
- Pravdiniana Sergeev & Pokivajlov, 1992
- Pterolepis Rambur, 1838
- Raggeana Pener, Broza & Ayal, 1971
- Rammeola Uvarov, 1934
- Rhacocleis Fieber, 1853
- Sardoplatycleis Massa & Fontana, 2011 - monotypic Sardoplatycleis galvagnii
- Sporadiana Zeuner, 1941 - monotypic Sporadiana sporadarum
- Roeseliana Zeuner, 1941 (formerly in Metrioptera)
- Schizonotinus Ramme, 1948
- Sepiana Zeuner, 1941
- Sphagniana Zeuner, 1941
- Steiroxys Herman, 1874
- Tessellana Zeuner, 1941
- Uludaghia Ramme, 1951
- Vichetia Harz, 1969
- Yersinella Ramme, 1933
- Zeuneriana Karsch, 1889

=== Tettigoniini ===
Auth. Krauss, 1902; distribution: Nearctic, Palaearctic, possibly through to Australasia

1. Acrodectes Rehn & Hebard, 1920
2. Amphiestris Fieber, 1853
3. Apote Scudder, 1897
4. Ateloplus Scudder, 1894
5. Capnobotes Scudder, 1897
6. Cyrtophyllicus Hebard, 1908
7. Elasmocercus Chopard, 1943
8. Evergoderes Bolívar, 1936
9. Farsodecticus Mirzayans, 1991
10. Hubbellia Hebard, 1927
11. Hyphinomos Uvarov, 1921
12. Idionotus Scudder, 1894
13. Medecticus Uvarov, 1912
14. Nanodectes Rentz, 1985
15. Platyoplus Tinkham, 1973
16. Sureyaella Uvarov, 1934
17. Tettigonia Linnaeus, 1758
18. Thyreonotus Serville, 1838
19. Zacycloptera Caudell, 1907

=== Tribe incertae sedis ===
- Bolua Ünal, 1999 - Turkey
- Dreuxia Chopard & Dreux, 1966 - Himalayas
- Neogampsocleis Caudell, 1935 - China

== Examples and Gallery ==
The Mormon cricket, actually a katydid and member of this subfamily, has been known to cause extensive damage when it breeds in large numbers in cropland. 123 species are native to North America.

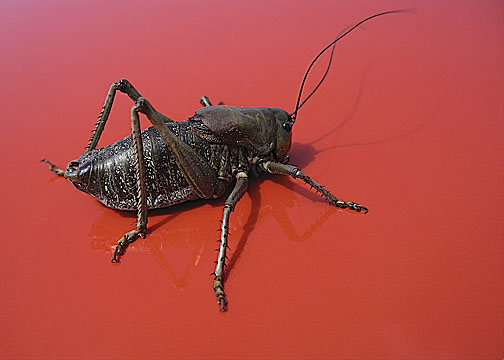
Anabrus simplex

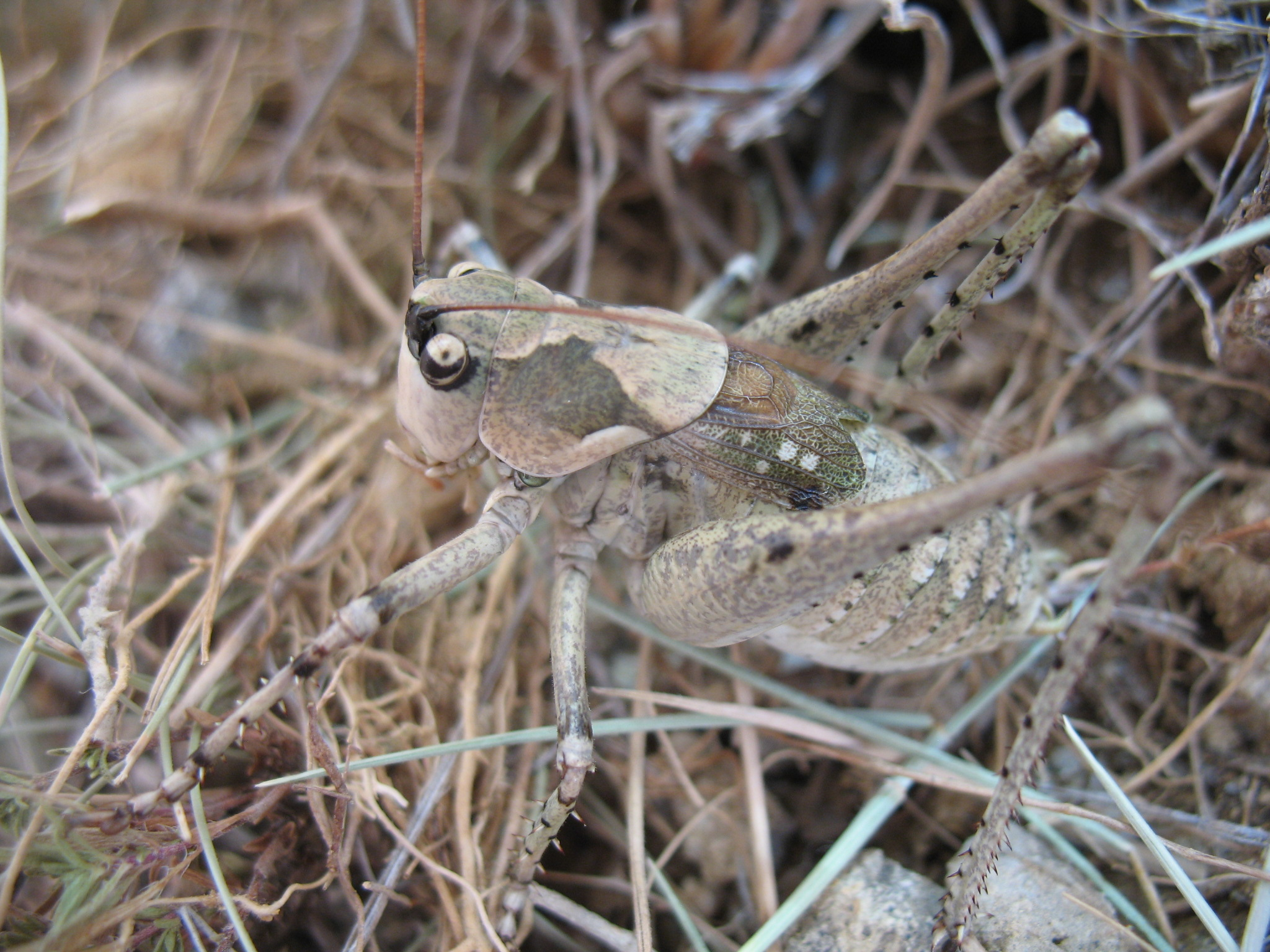
Anadrymadusa sp.

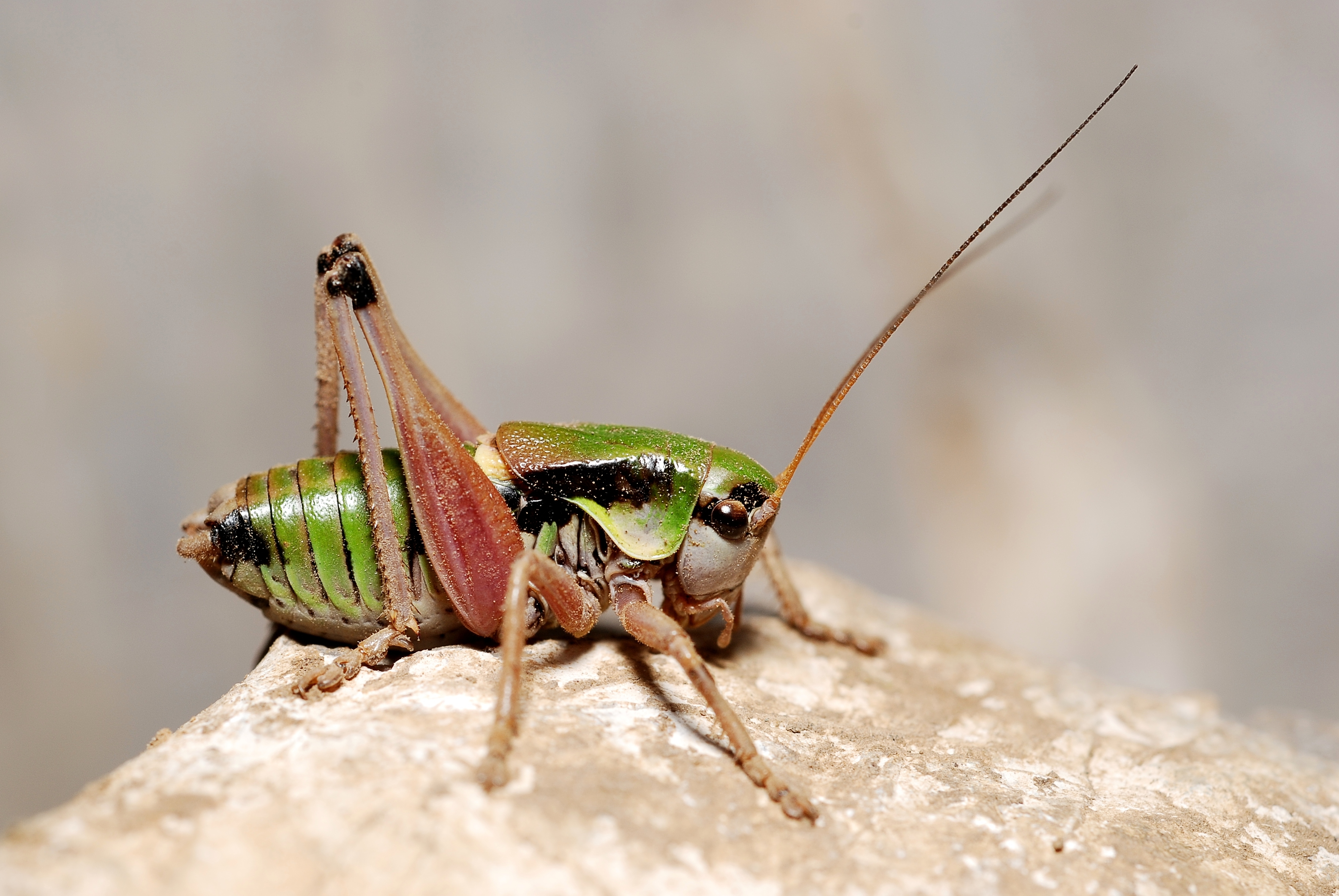
Anonconotus sp.

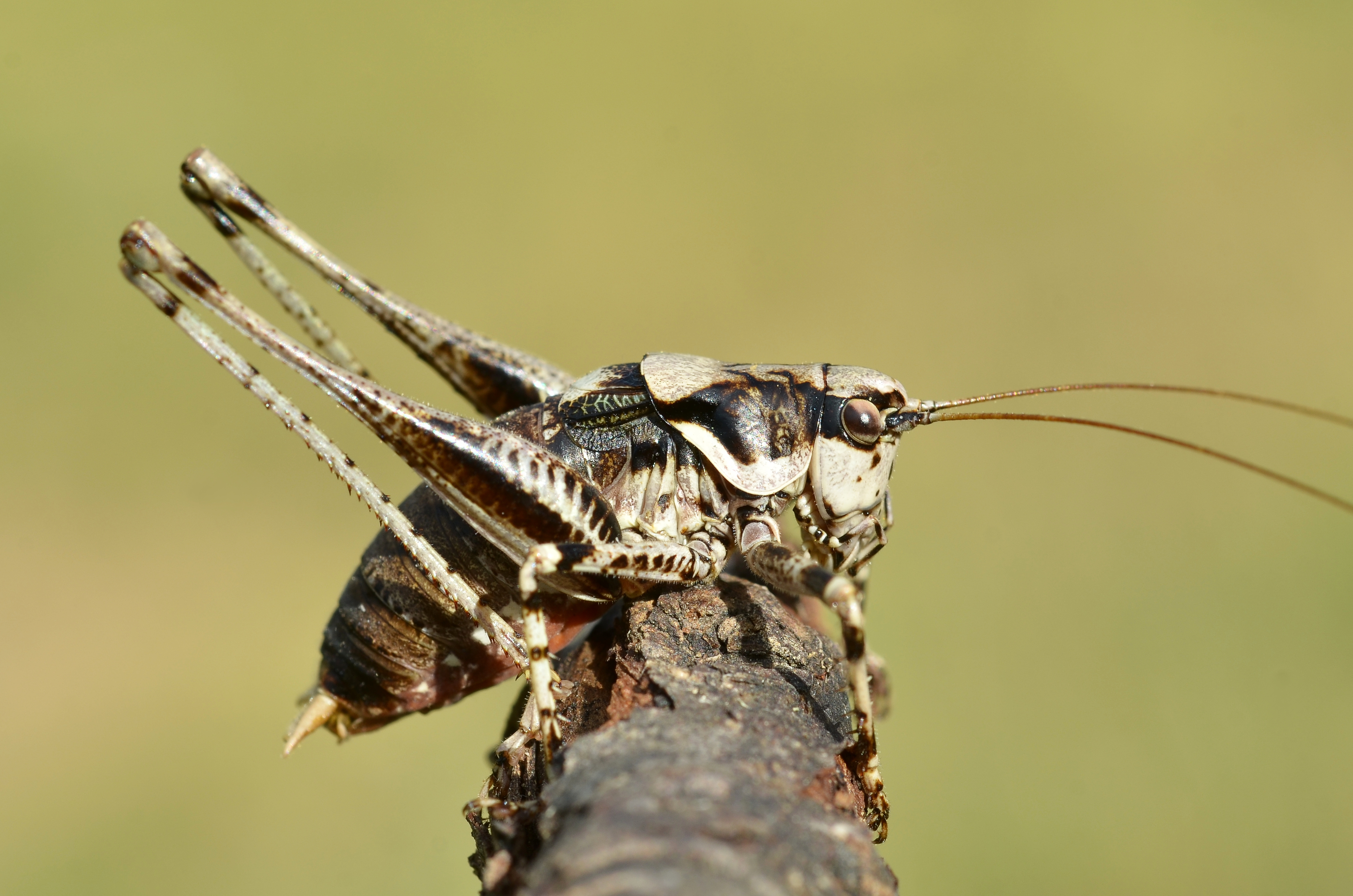
Antaxius pedestris

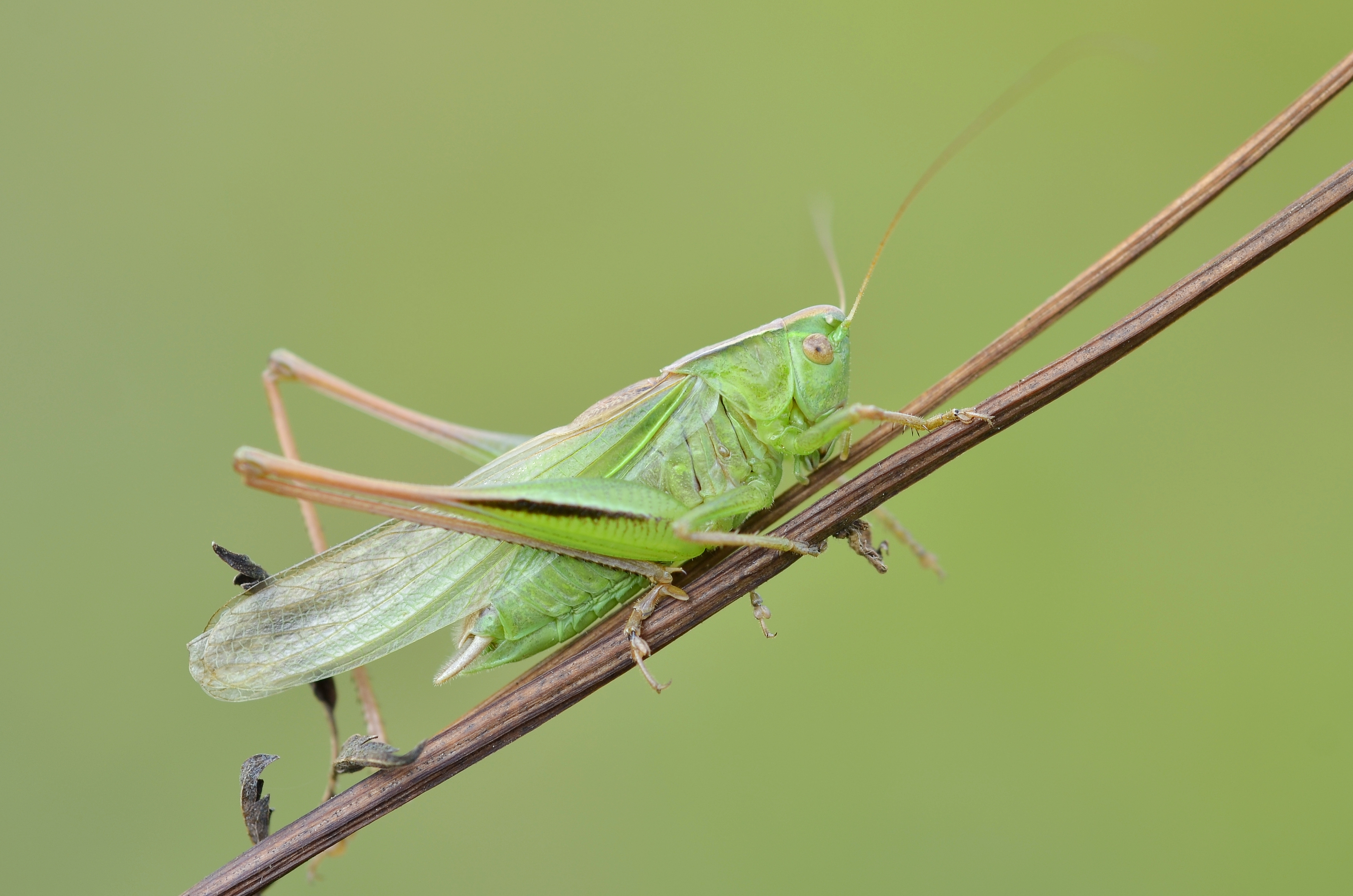
Bicolorana bicolor

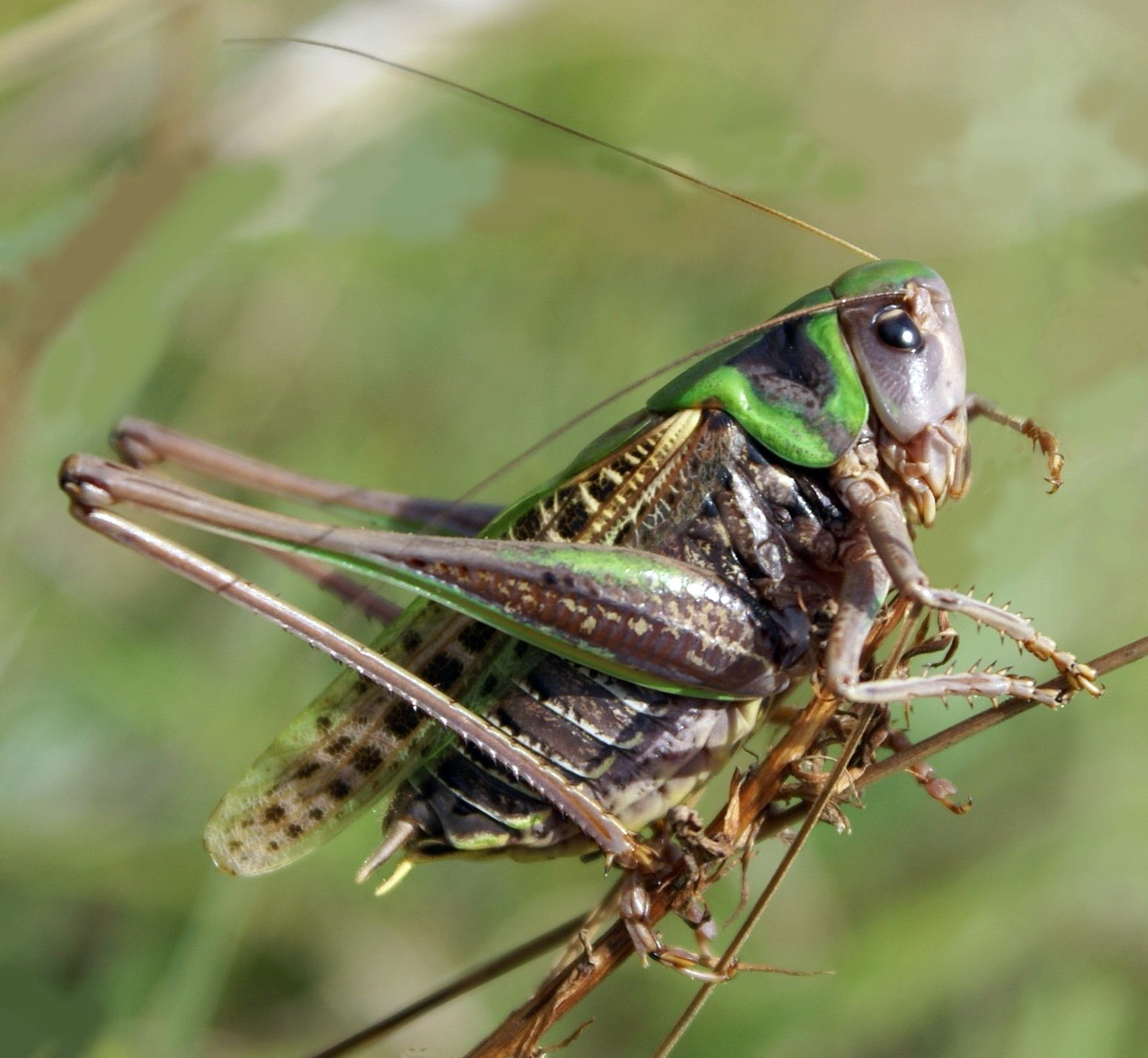
Decticus verrucivorus

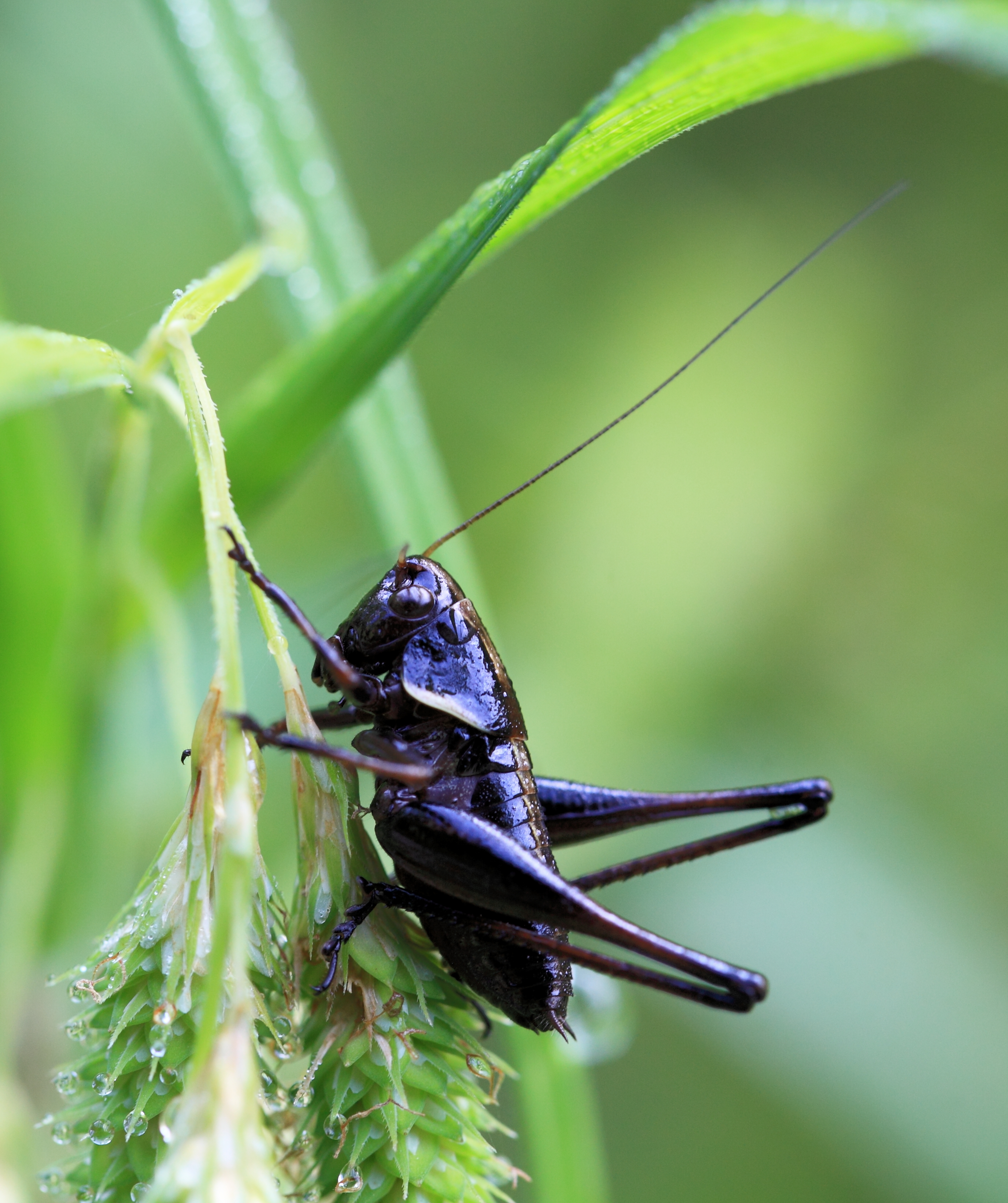
Eobiana engelhardti

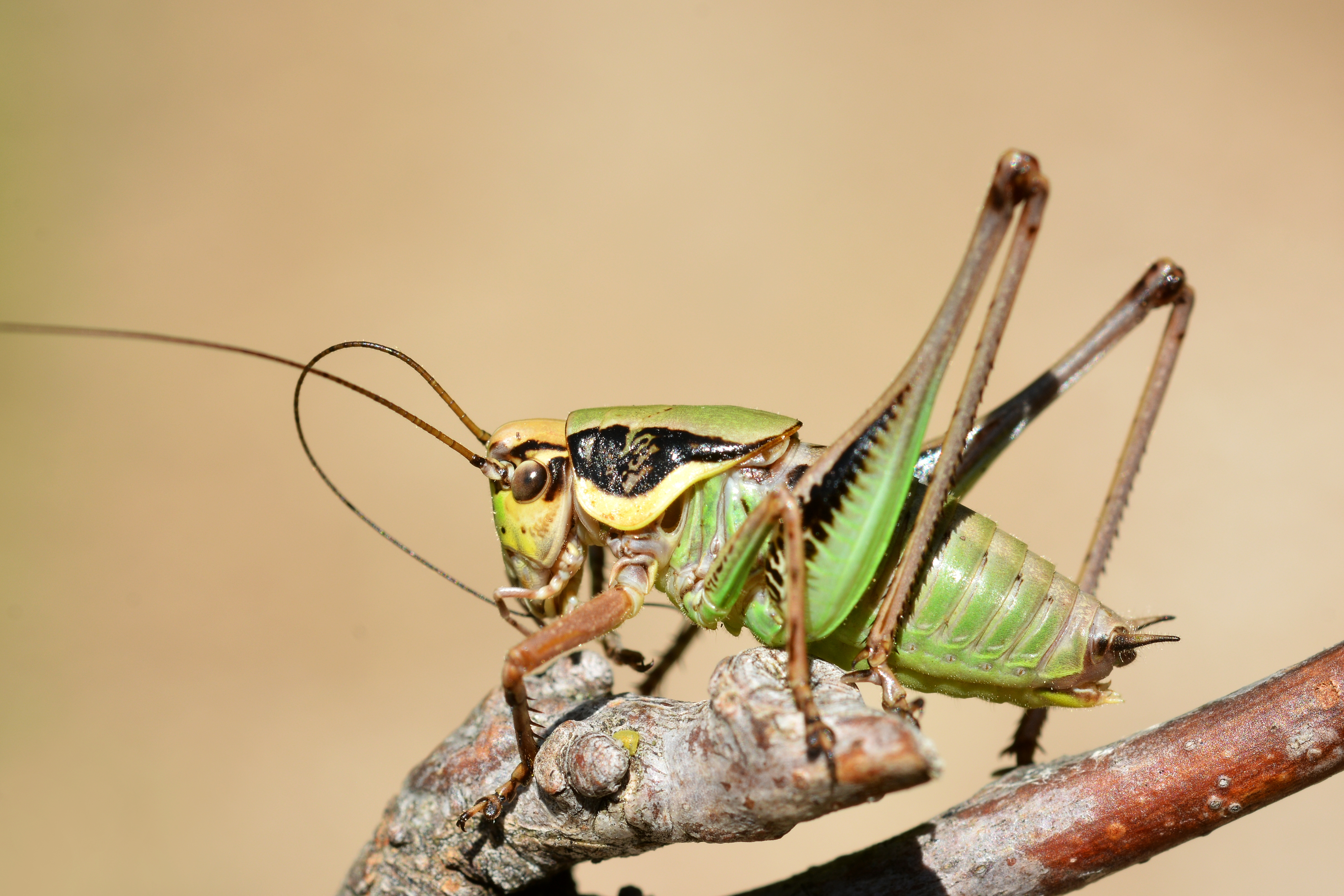
Eupholidoptera chabrieri

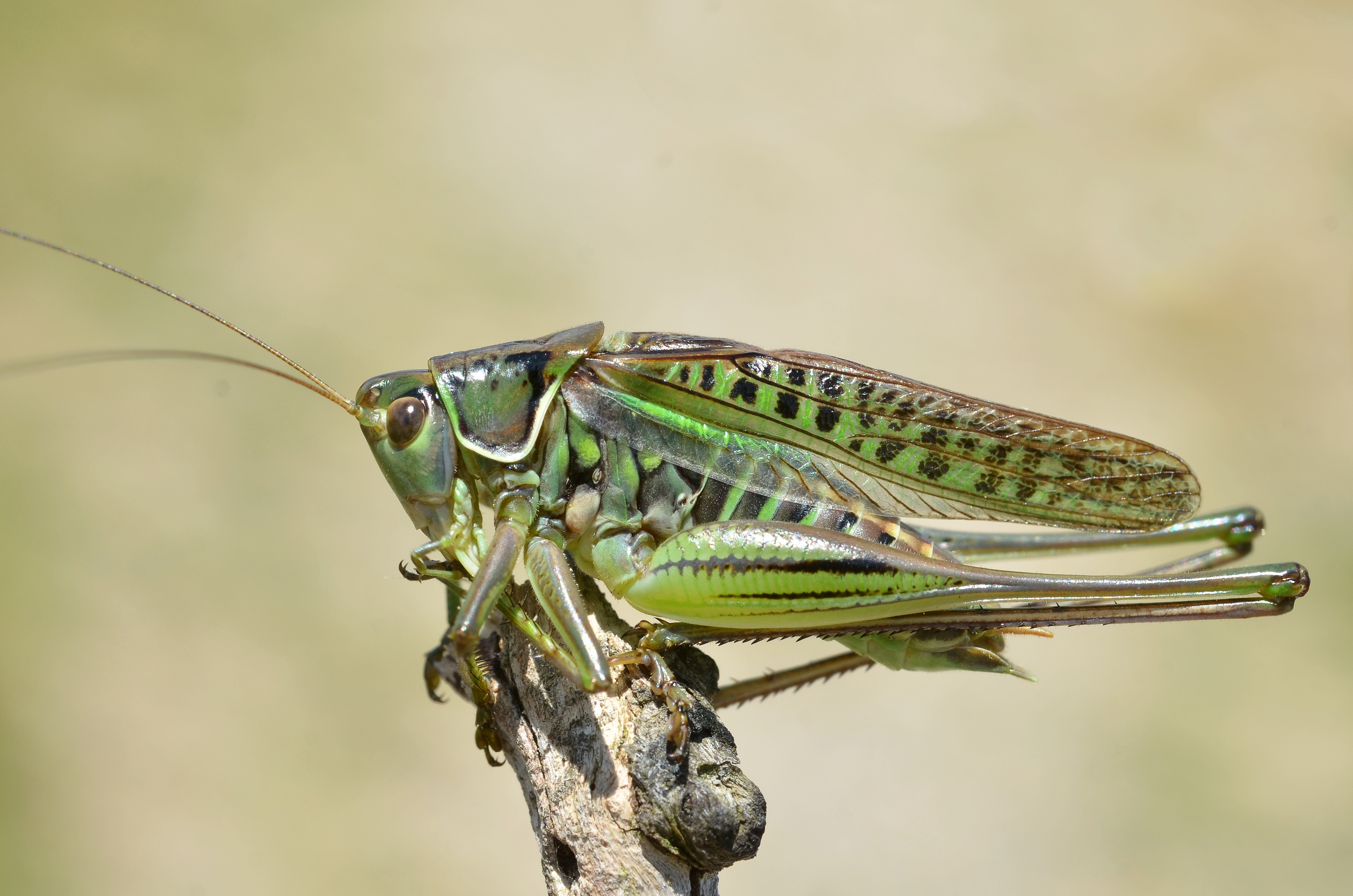
Gampsocleis glabra

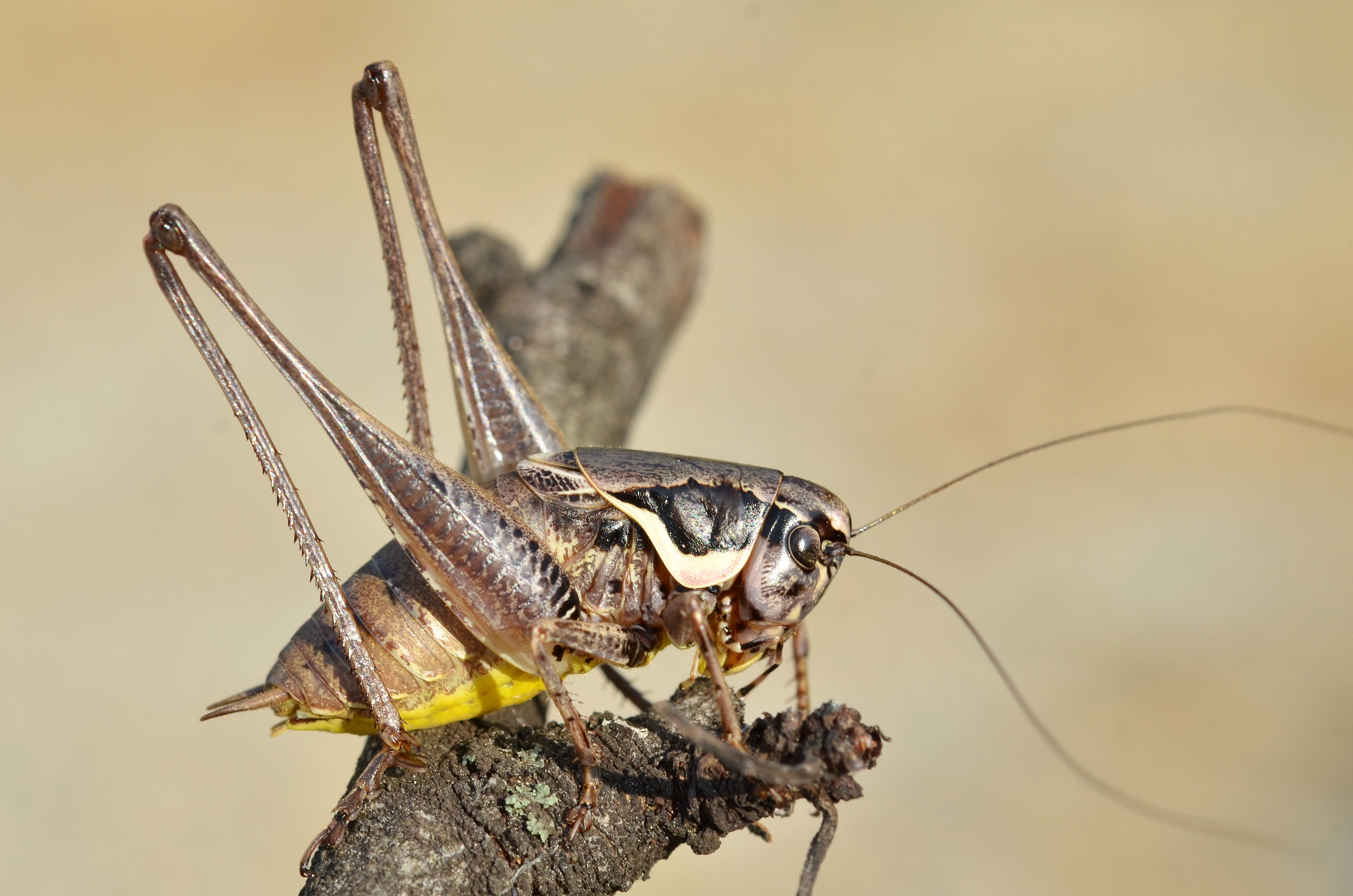
Pholidoptera femorata

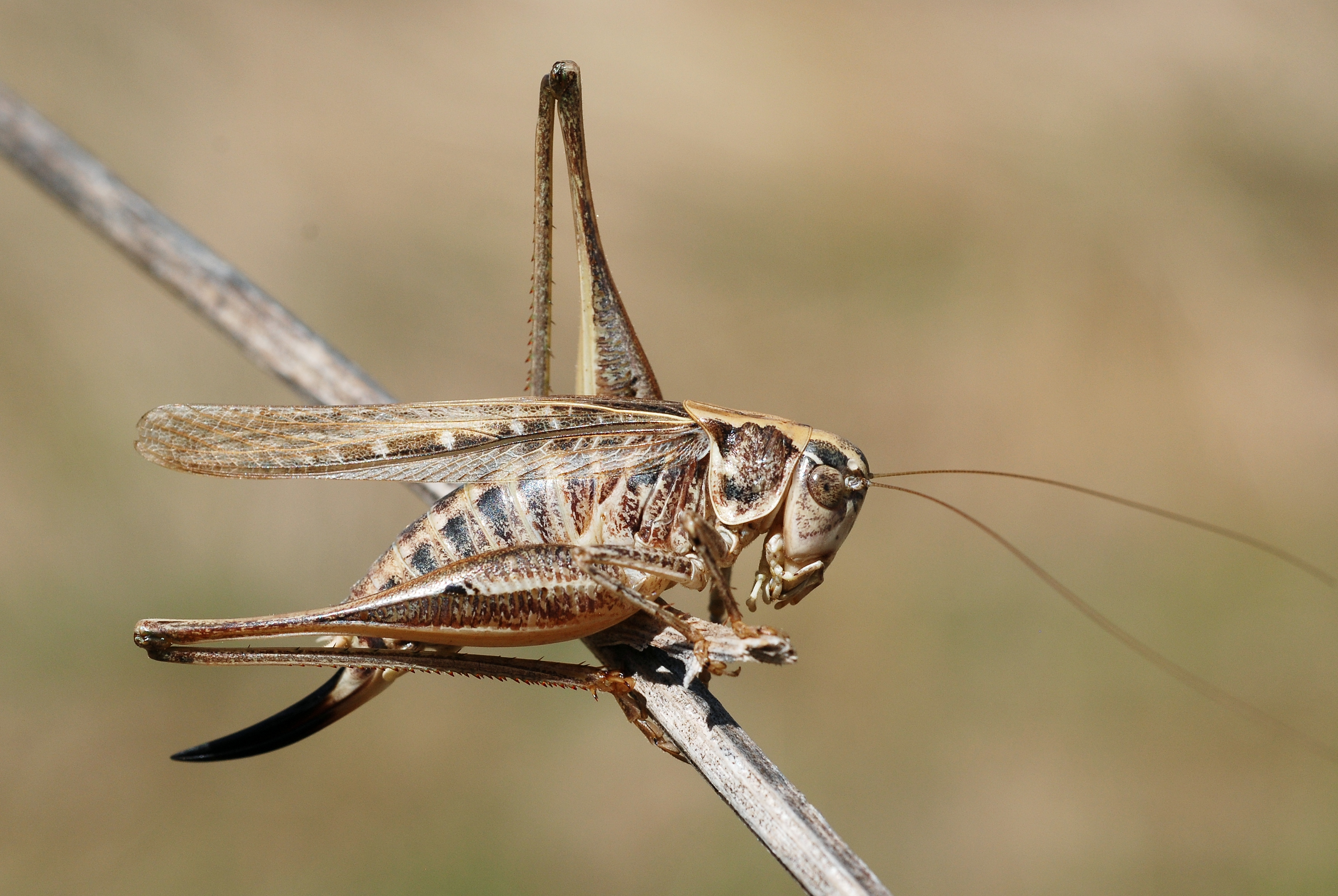
Platycleis affinis

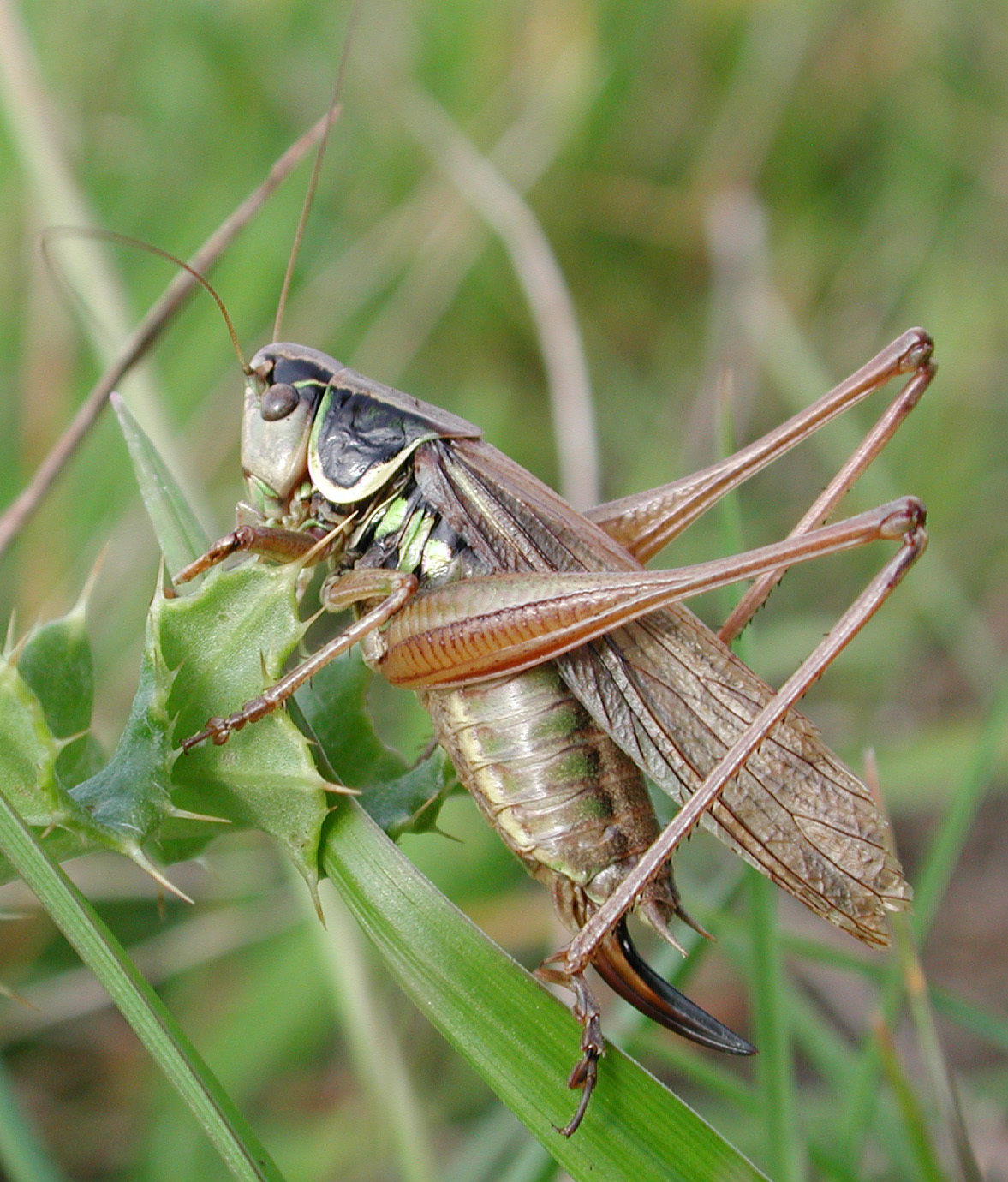
Roeseliana roeselii

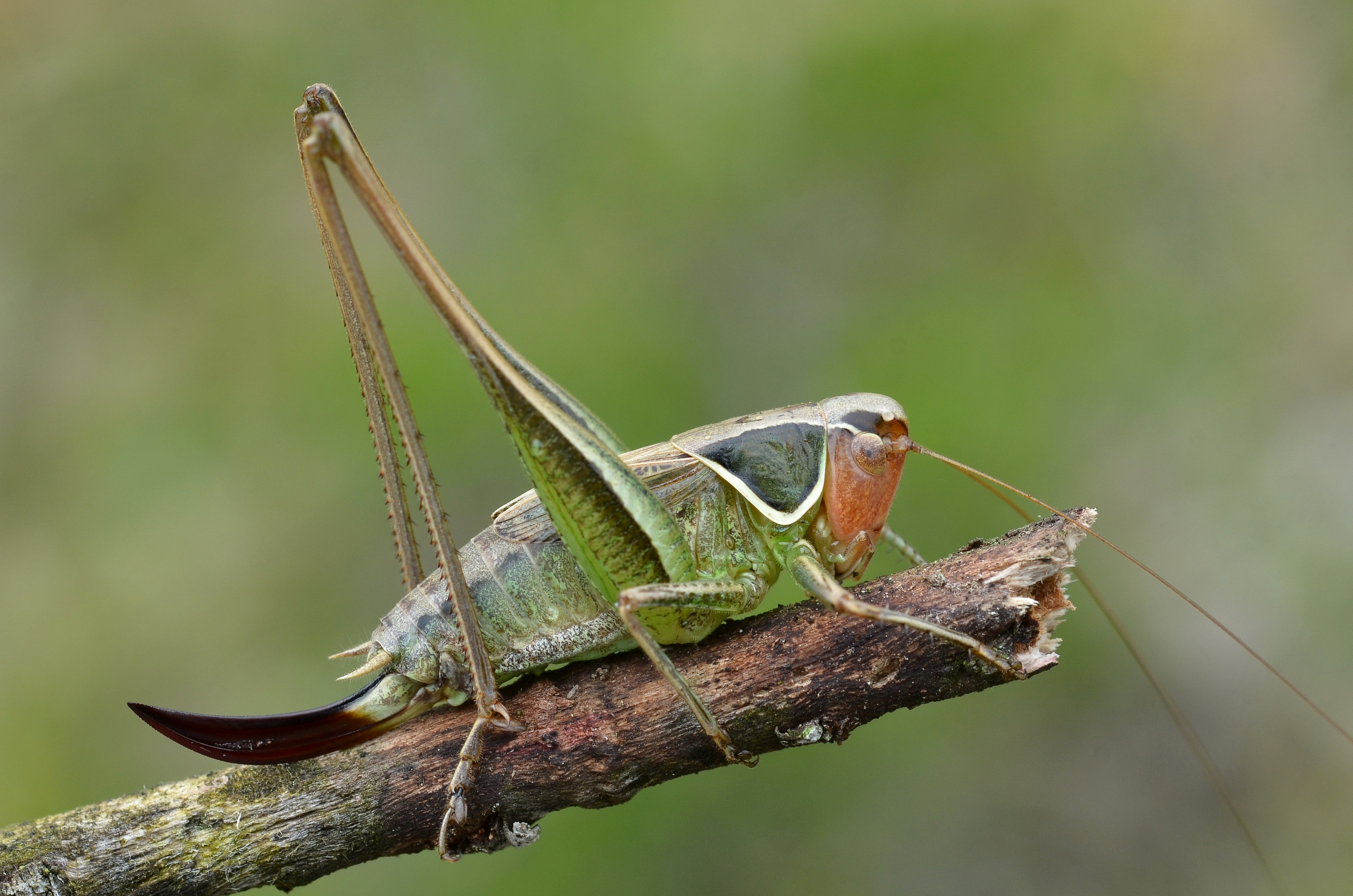
Sepiana
(monotypic genus)

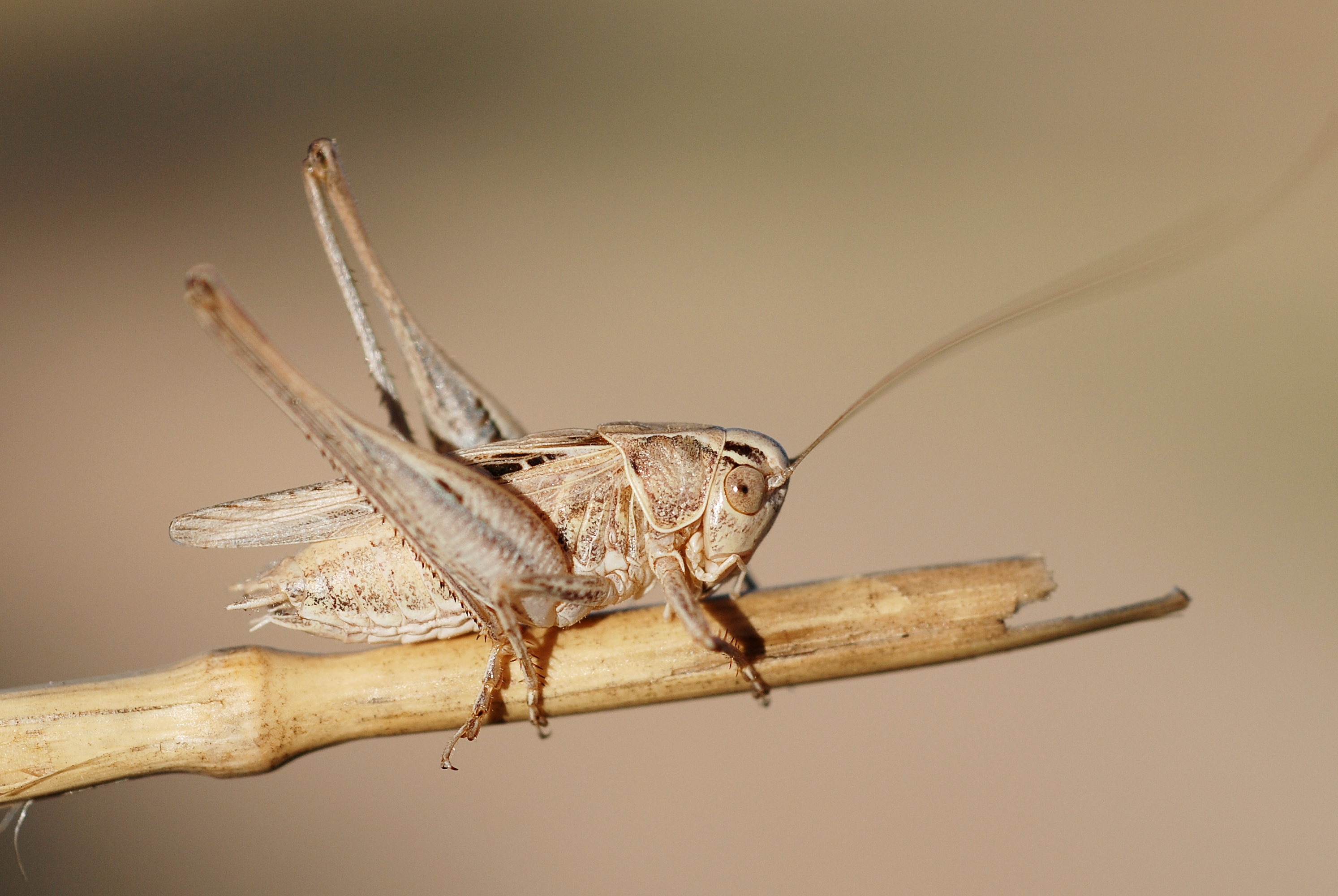
Tessellana tessellata

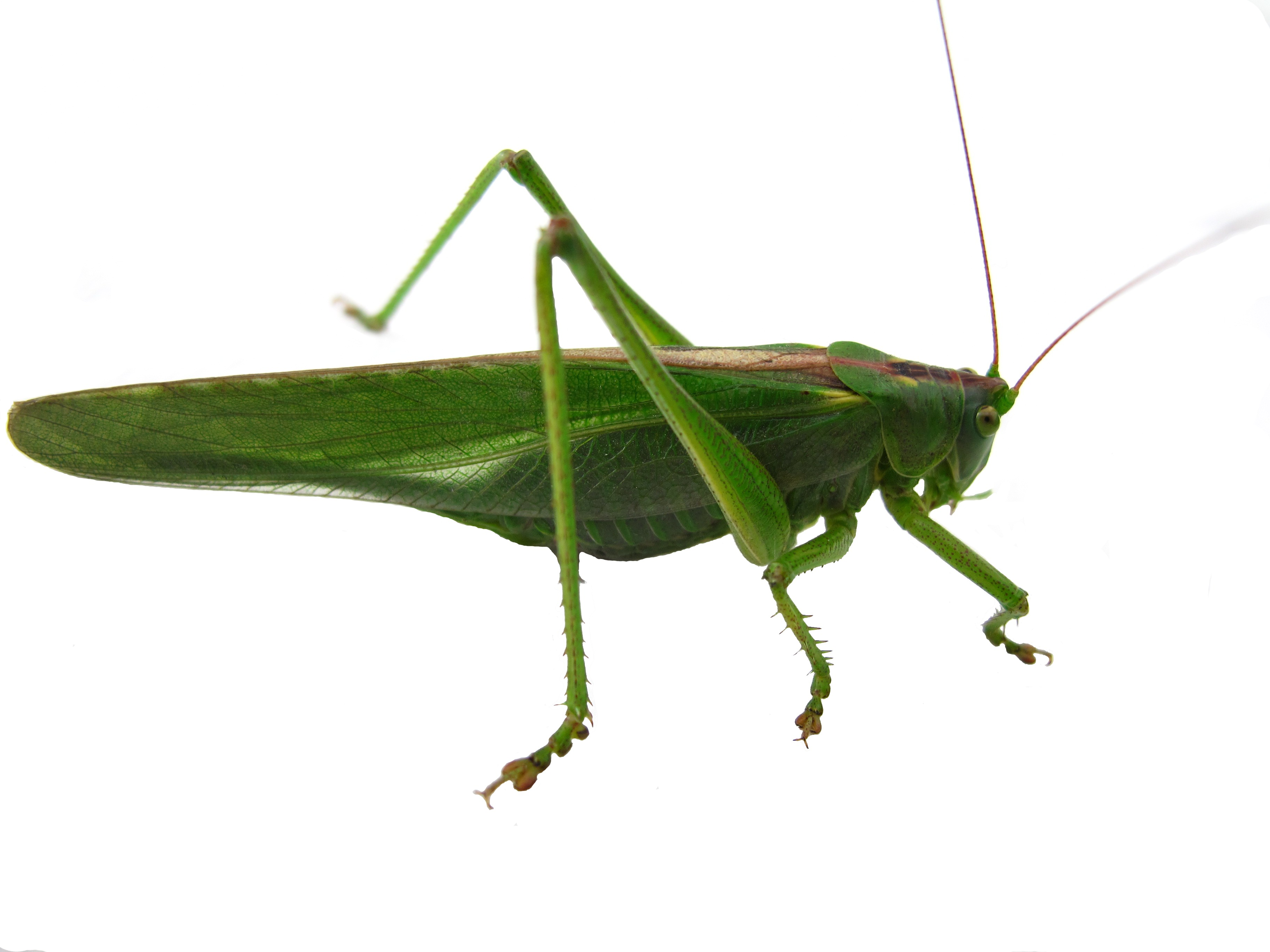
Tettigonia viridissima

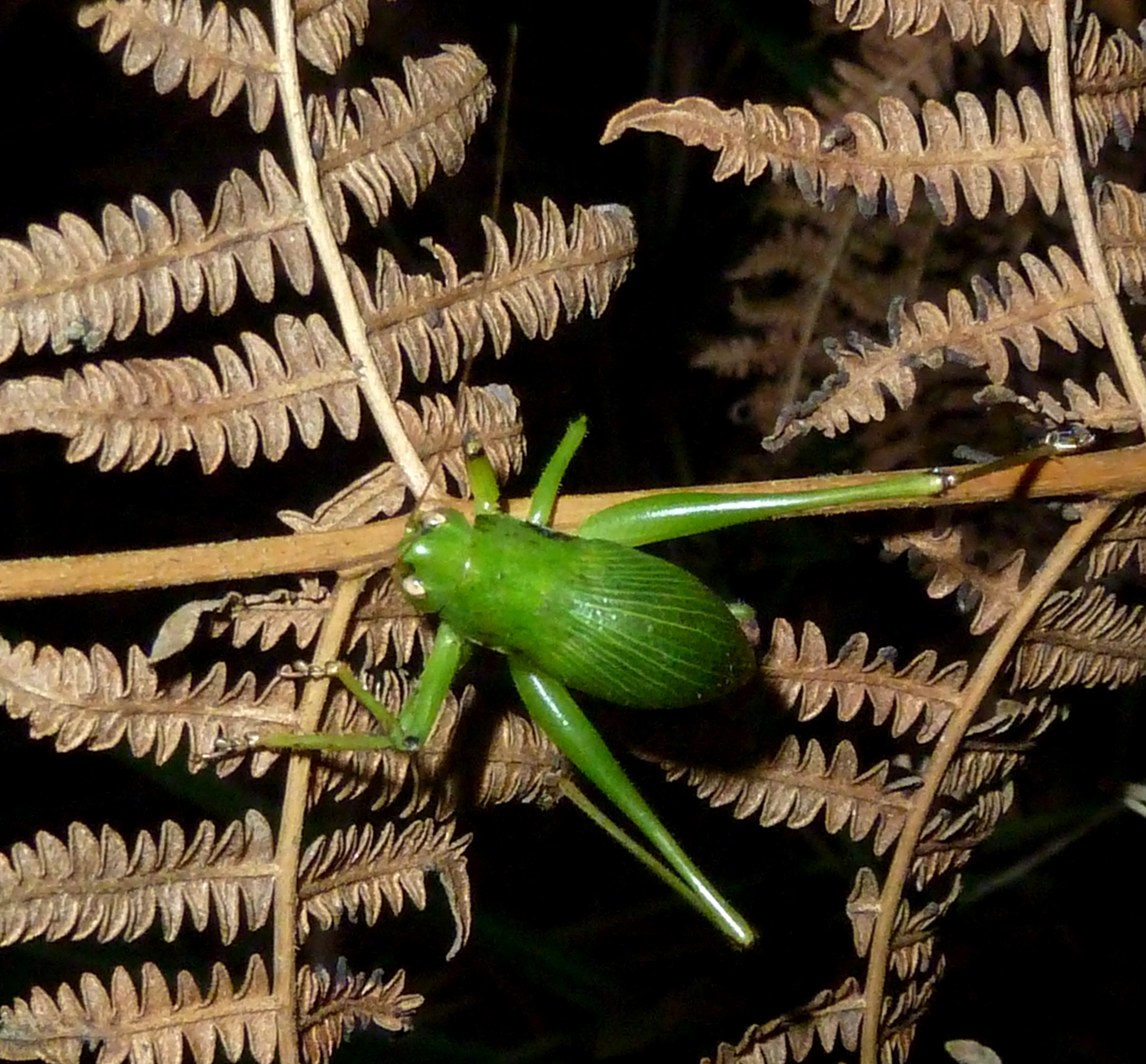
Thoracistus sp.

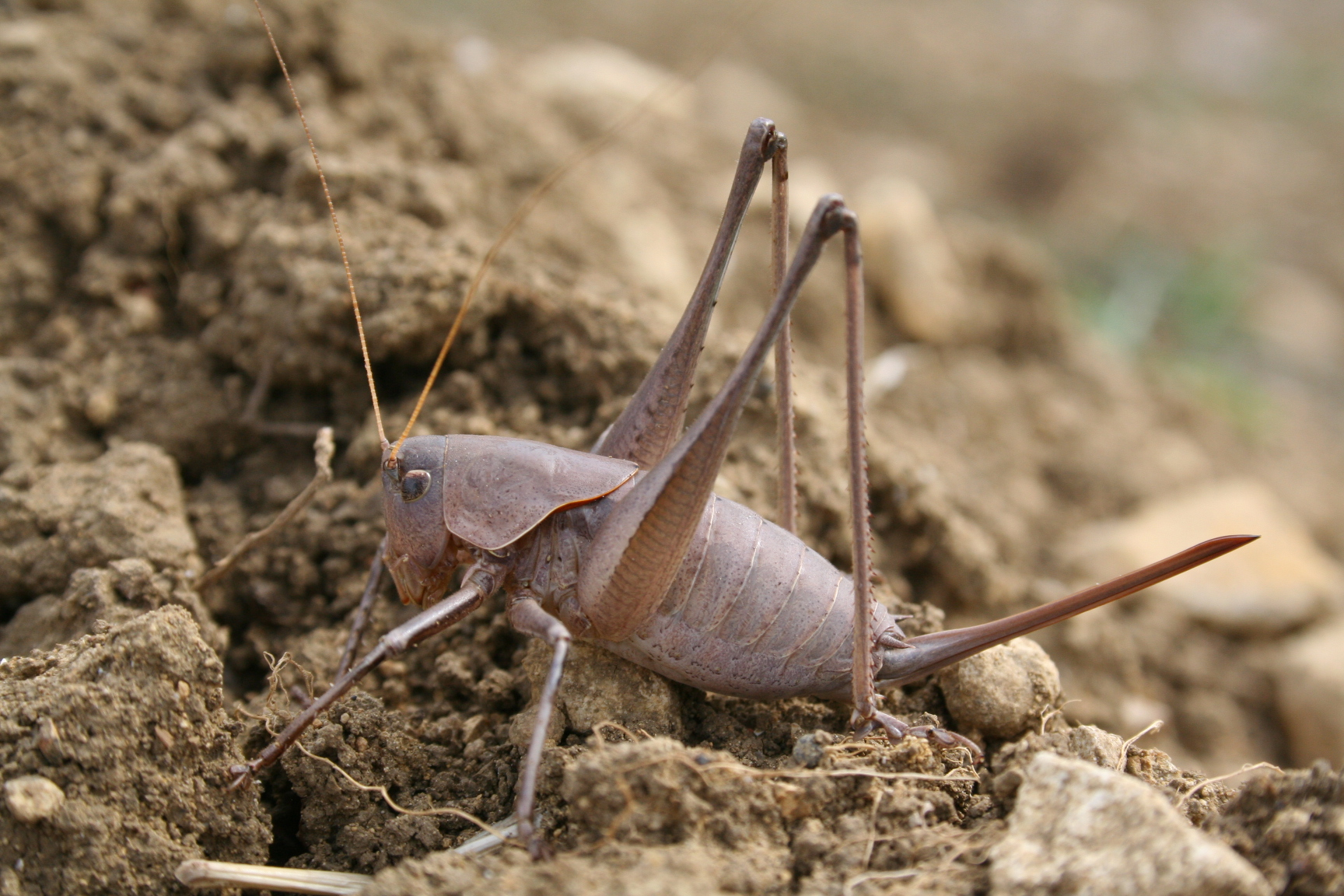
Thyreonotus corsicus

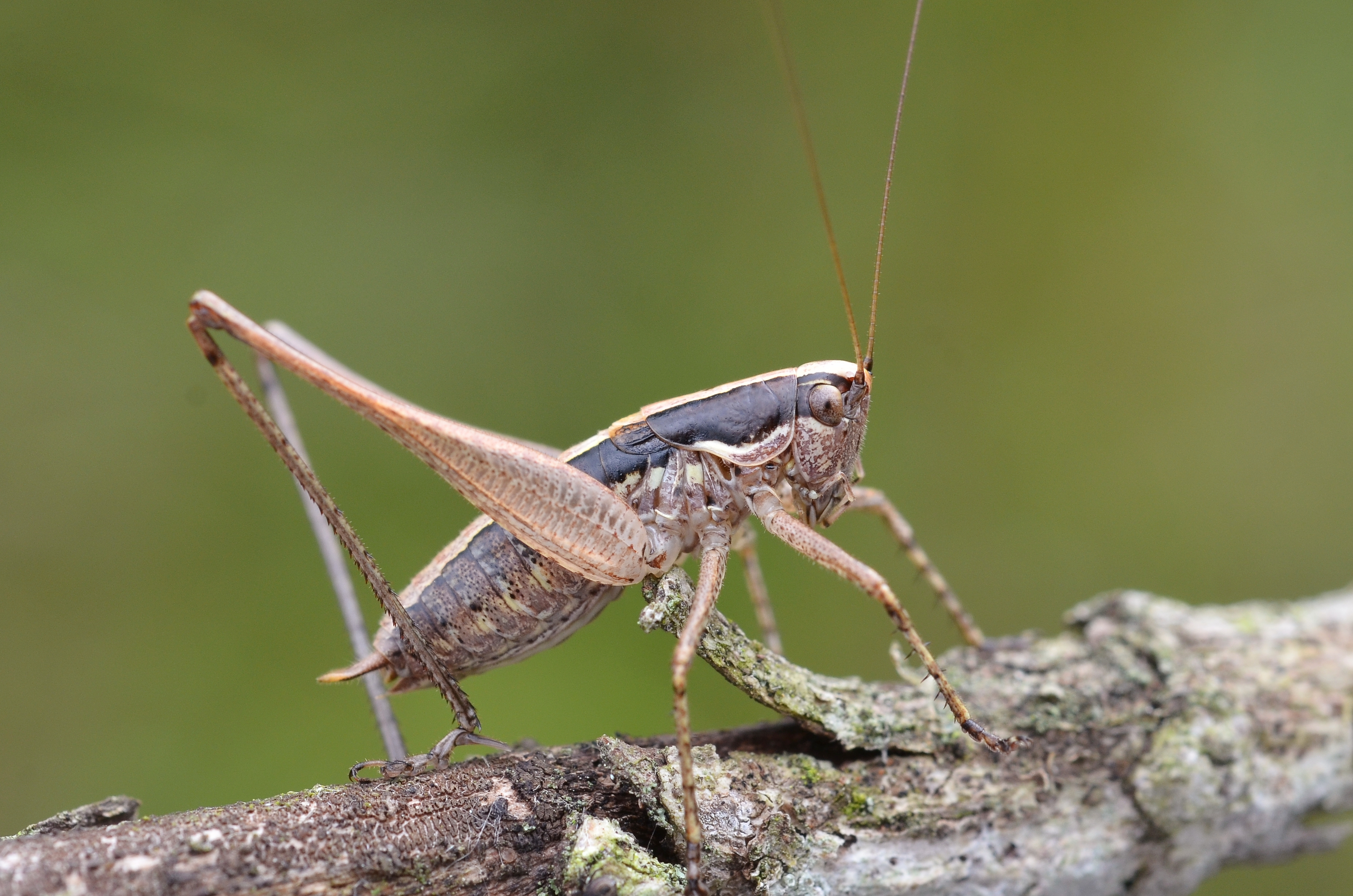
Yersinella raymondii

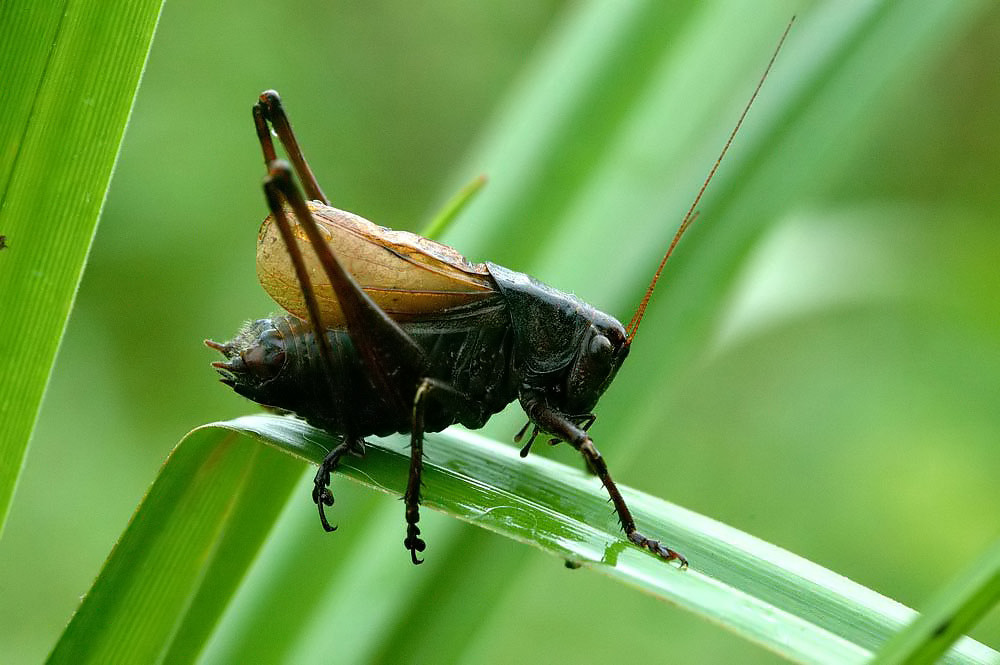
Zeuneriana marmorata
