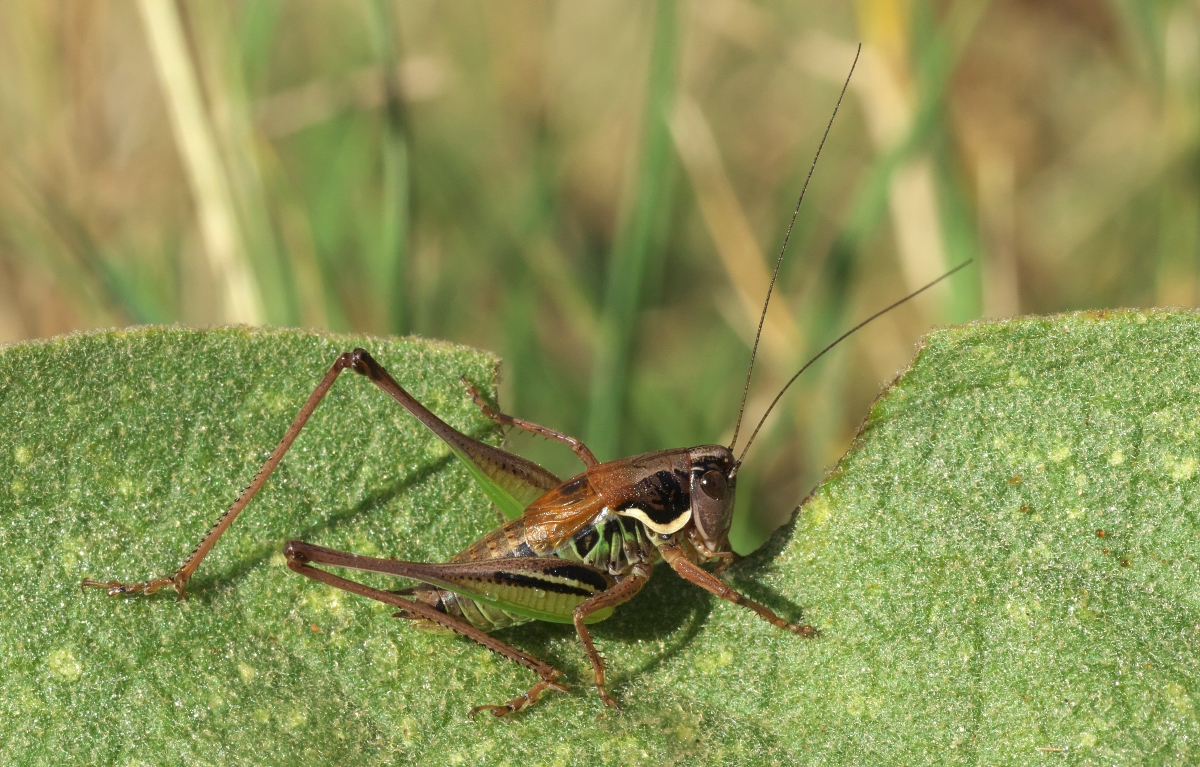
- Anterastes serbicus male
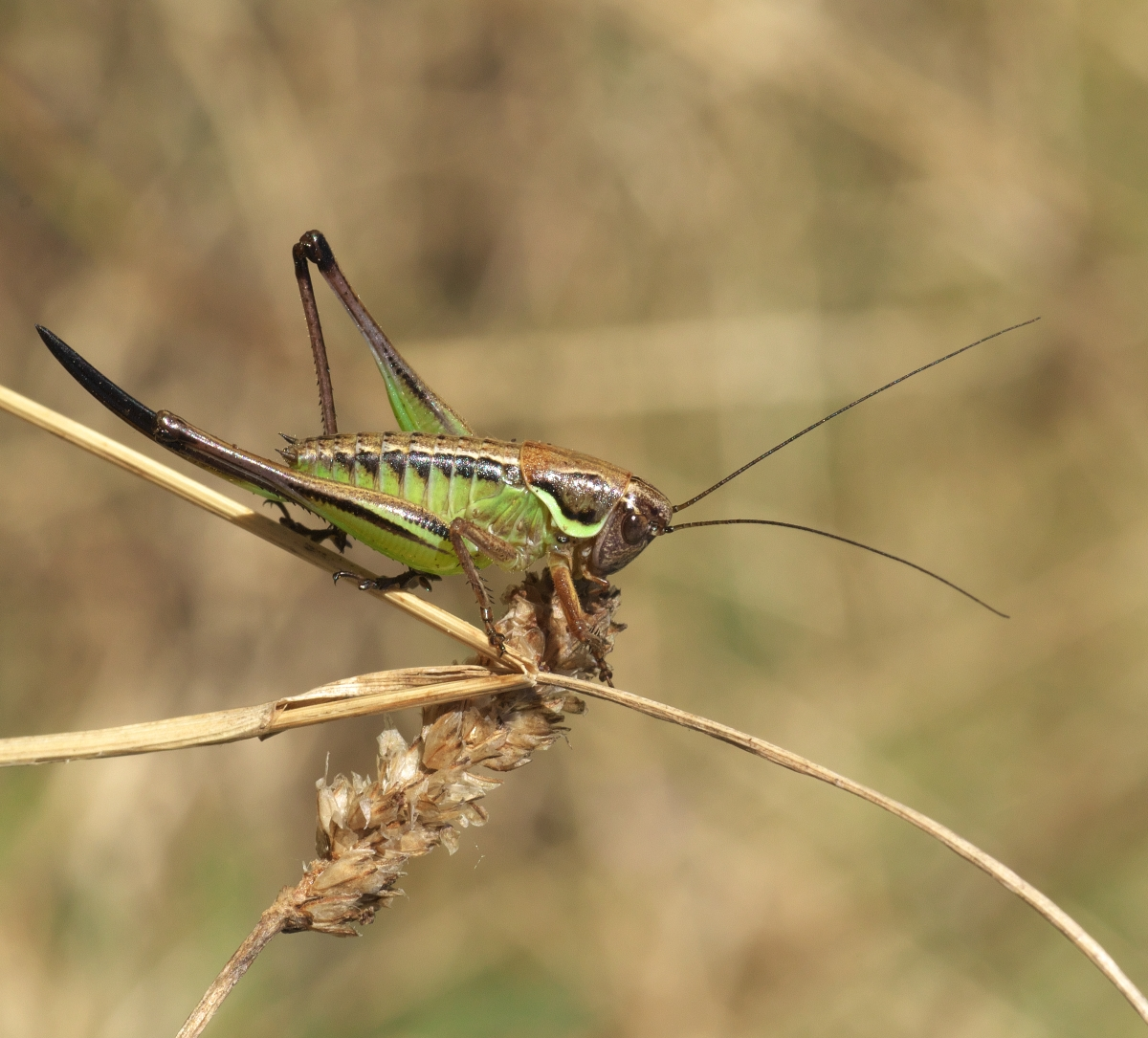
- A. serbicus female

Scientific classification
- Kingdom: Animalia
- Phylum: Arthropoda
- Clade: Pancrustacea
- Class: Insecta
- Order: Orthoptera
- Suborder: Ensifera
- Family: Tettigoniidae
- Subfamily: Tettigoniinae
- Tribe: Platycleidini
- Genus: Anterastes; Brunner von Wattenwyl, 1882

Synonyms
- Uludaghia Ramme, 1951

= Anterastes =

Genus of cricket-like animals

Anterastes is a genus of Palaearctic bush crickets in the tribe Platycleidini, erected by Carl Brunner von Wattenwyl in 1882. Species can be found in South-eastern Europe, with most records from the Balkans, Greece and Turkey.

== Species ==
The Orthoptera Species File lists the following accepted species:

species group anatolicus Uvarov, 1934

1. Anterastes anatolicus Uvarov, 1934

species group babadaghi Uvarov, 1939

1. Anterastes babadaghi Uvarov, 1939
2. Anterastes niger Ünal, 2000
3. Anterastes turcicus Karabag, 1951

species group serbicus Brunner von Wattenwyl, 1882

1. Anterastes antitauricus Çiplak, 2004
2. Anterastes burri Karabag, 1951
3. Anterastes serbicus Brunner von Wattenwyl, 1882 - type species
4. Anterastes tolunayi Karabag, 1951

species group uludaghensis Karabag, 1950

1. Anterastes antecessor Kaya & Çiplak, 2011
2. Anterastes davrazensis Kaya, Chobanov & Çiplak, 2012
3. Anterastes uludaghensis Karabag, 1950
