= Transkeidectes =

Conservation status
- Critically Endangered (IUCN 3.1)

Scientific classification
- Domain: Eukaryota
- Kingdom: Animalia
- Phylum: Arthropoda
- Class: Insecta
- Order: Orthoptera
- Suborder: Ensifera
- Family: Tettigoniidae
- Subfamily: Tettigoniinae
- Tribe: Arytropteridini
- Genus: Transkeidectes; Naskrecki, 1992
- Species: T. multidentis

Binomial name
- Transkeidectes multidentis Naskrecki, 1992

Species of cricket-like animal

Transkeidectes multidentis, the Transkei shieldback, is a species of katydid in the family Tettigoniidae. It is the only species in the genus Transkeidectes. The species is endemic to Port St. Johns in South Africa.
