= Platyoplus =

Scientific classification
- Domain: Eukaryota
- Kingdom: Animalia
- Phylum: Arthropoda
- Class: Insecta
- Order: Orthoptera
- Suborder: Ensifera
- Family: Tettigoniidae
- Subfamily: Tettigoniinae
- Tribe: Tettigoniini
- Genus: Platyoplus; Tinkham, 1973
- Species: P. gilaensis

Binomial name
- Platyoplus gilaensis Tinkham, 1973

Genus of cricket-like animals

Platyoplus is a genus of shield-backed katydids in the family Tettigoniidae. There is one described species in Platyoplus, P. gilaensis.
