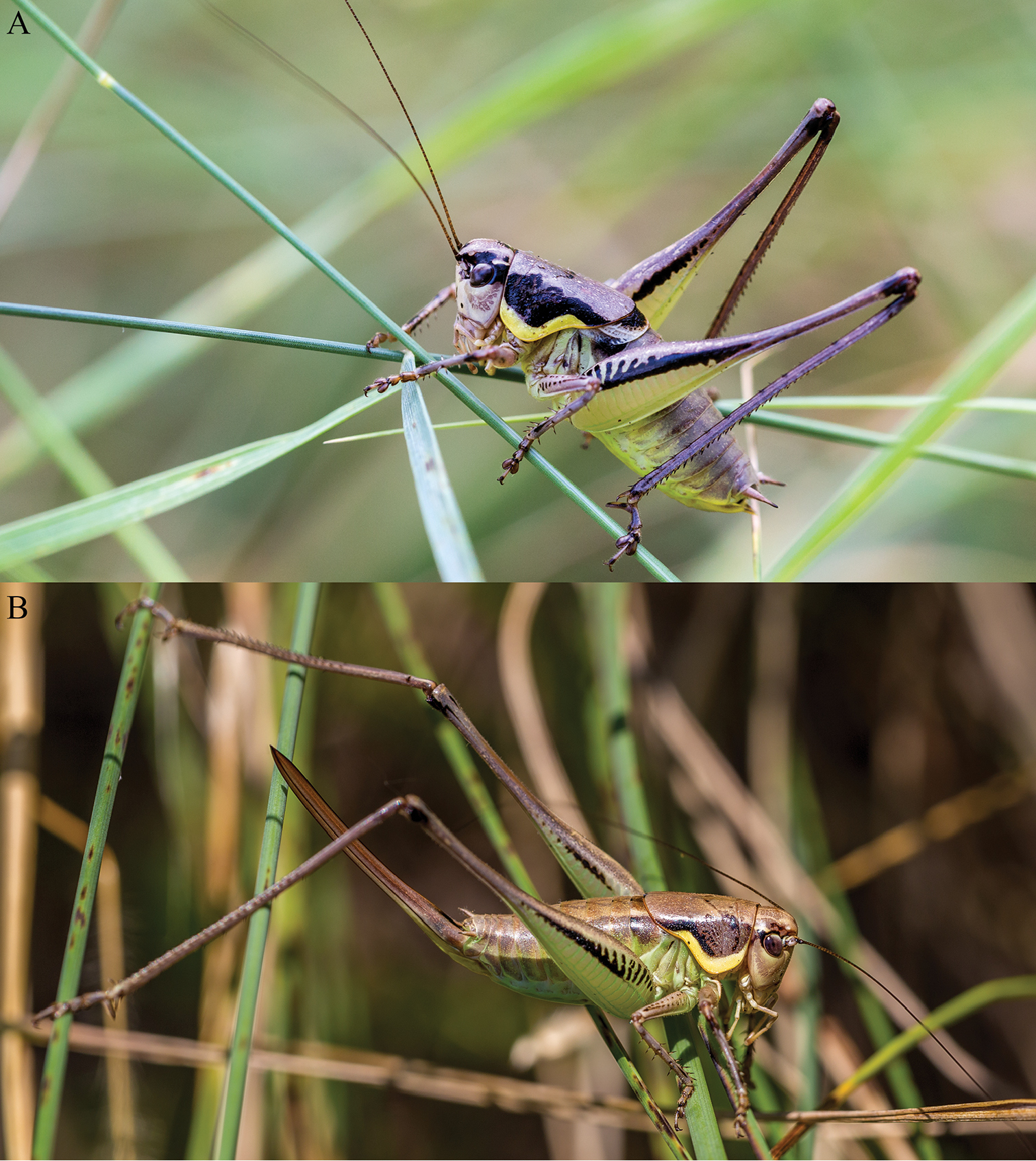
- Parapholidoptera castaneoviridis

Scientific classification
- Kingdom: Animalia
- Phylum: Arthropoda
- Class: Insecta
- Order: Orthoptera
- Suborder: Ensifera
- Family: Tettigoniidae
- Subfamily: Tettigoniinae
- Tribe: Pholidopterini
- Genus: Parapholidoptera; Maran, 1953

Synonyms
- Parapholidoptera Ramme, 1951 (originally nomen nudum, subsequently made available)

= Parapholidoptera =

Genus of cricket-like animals

External image
- Images at iNaturalist

Parapholidoptera is a genus of Palaearctic bush crickets in the tribe Pholidopterini, erected by Josef Mařan in 1953. Species are recorded from south-eastern Europe and the Middle East, through to the Black Sea (distribution may be incomplete).

== Species ==
The Orthoptera Species File lists:

species group castaneoviridis (Brunner von Wattenwyl, 1882)

1. Parapholidoptera anatolicus Karabag, 1952
2. Parapholidoptera antaliae Nadig, 1991
3. Parapholidoptera bolkarensis Çiplak, 2000
4. Parapholidoptera castaneoviridis (Brunner von Wattenwyl, 1882) - type species (as Thamnotrizon castaneoviridis Brunner von Wattenwyl, by subsequent designation)
5. Parapholidoptera flexuosa Karabag, 1961
6. Parapholidoptera georgiae Massa, Buzzetti & Fontana, 2009
7. Parapholidoptera grandis (Karabag, 1952)
8. Parapholidoptera indistincta (Bolívar, 1899)
9. Parapholidoptera kalashiani Massa, Buzzetti & Fontana, 2009
10. Parapholidoptera noxia (Ramme, 1930)
11. Parapholidoptera punctifrons (Burmeister, 1838)
12. Parapholidoptera salmani Çiplak, 2000
13. Parapholidoptera signata (Brunner von Wattenwyl, 1861)
14. Parapholidoptera spinulosa Karabag, 1956
15. Parapholidoptera syriaca (Ramme, 1930)
16. Parapholidoptera willemsei Katbeh Bader & Massa, 2001
17. Parapholidoptera yarpuzi Ünal, 2018
18. Parapholidoptera yoruka Çiplak, 2000

species group not determined

1. Parapholidoptera belen Ünal, 2006
