= Bucephaloptera =

Scientific classification
- Domain: Eukaryota
- Kingdom: Animalia
- Phylum: Arthropoda
- Class: Insecta
- Order: Orthoptera
- Suborder: Ensifera
- Family: Tettigoniidae
- Subfamily: Tettigoniinae
- Tribe: Platycleidini
- Genus: Bucephaloptera; Ebner, 1923

Genus of cricket-like animals

External image
- Images at iNaturalist

Bucephaloptera is a genus of Palaearctic bush crickets in the tribe Platycleidini, erected by R. Ebner in 1923. Species can be found in South-eastern Europe through to Iraq and Jordan in the Middle East.

== Species ==
The Orthoptera Species File lists the following accepted species:

1. Bucephaloptera bolivari Karabag, 1950
2. Bucephaloptera bucephala (Brunner von Wattenwyl, 1882) - type species (as Thamnotrizon bucephalus Brunner von Wattenwyl)
3. Bucephaloptera convergens Karabag, 1950
4. Bucephaloptera cypria Ramme, 1933
5. Bucephaloptera ebneri Uvarov, 1927
6. Bucephaloptera robusta Karabag, 1956
