= Kansua =

Scientific classification
- Domain: Eukaryota
- Kingdom: Animalia
- Phylum: Arthropoda
- Class: Insecta
- Order: Orthoptera
- Suborder: Ensifera
- Family: Tettigoniidae
- Subfamily: Tettigoniinae
- Tribe: Drymadusini
- Genus: Kansua; Uvarov, 1933

Genus of cricket-like animals

Kansua is a small genus of bush crickets or katydids in the tribe Drymadusini. Species are found in northern China.

== Species ==
The Orthoptera Species File includes:

- Kansua diebua Liu, 2015
- Kansua hummeli Uvarov, 1933 - type species
