= Uvarovistia =

Scientific classification
- Kingdom: Animalia
- Phylum: Arthropoda
- Clade: Pancrustacea
- Class: Insecta
- Order: Orthoptera
- Suborder: Ensifera
- Family: Tettigoniidae
- Subfamily: Tettigoniinae
- Tribe: Pholidopterini
- Genus: Uvarovistia; Maran, 1953

Synonyms
- Uvarovistia Ramme, 1951 (originally nomen nudum, subsequently made available)

Genus of cricket-like animals

External image
- Images at iNaturalist

Uvarovistia is a genus of Palaearctic bush crickets in the tribe Pholidopterini, confirmed by Maran in 1953. Species have been recorded from Cyprus, Turkey through to Afghanistan (but the distribution may be incomplete). The genus is named after Boris Uvarov, who originally identified what became the type species.

== Species ==
Uluar et al. (2021) provide an updated key to species in Uvarovistia; the Orthoptera Species File lists:

1. Uvarovistia bakhtiara (Uvarov, 1934)
2. Uvarovistia iraka (Uvarov, 1934)
3. Uvarovistia munzurensis Uluar & Yahyaoğlu, 2021
4. Uvarovistia satunini (Uvarov, 1916)
5. Uvarovistia zebra (Uvarov, 1916) - type species (as Olynthoscelis zebra Uvarov, by subsequent designation)
