= Cyrtophyllicus =

Scientific classification
- Domain: Eukaryota
- Kingdom: Animalia
- Phylum: Arthropoda
- Class: Insecta
- Order: Orthoptera
- Suborder: Ensifera
- Family: Tettigoniidae
- Subfamily: Tettigoniinae
- Tribe: Tettigoniini
- Genus: Cyrtophyllicus; Hebard, 1908
- Species: C. chlorum

Binomial name
- Cyrtophyllicus chlorum Hebard, 1908

Genus of cricket-like animals

Cyrtophyllicus is a genus of shield-backed katydids in the family Tettigoniidae. There is one described species in Cyrtophyllicus, C. chlorum.
