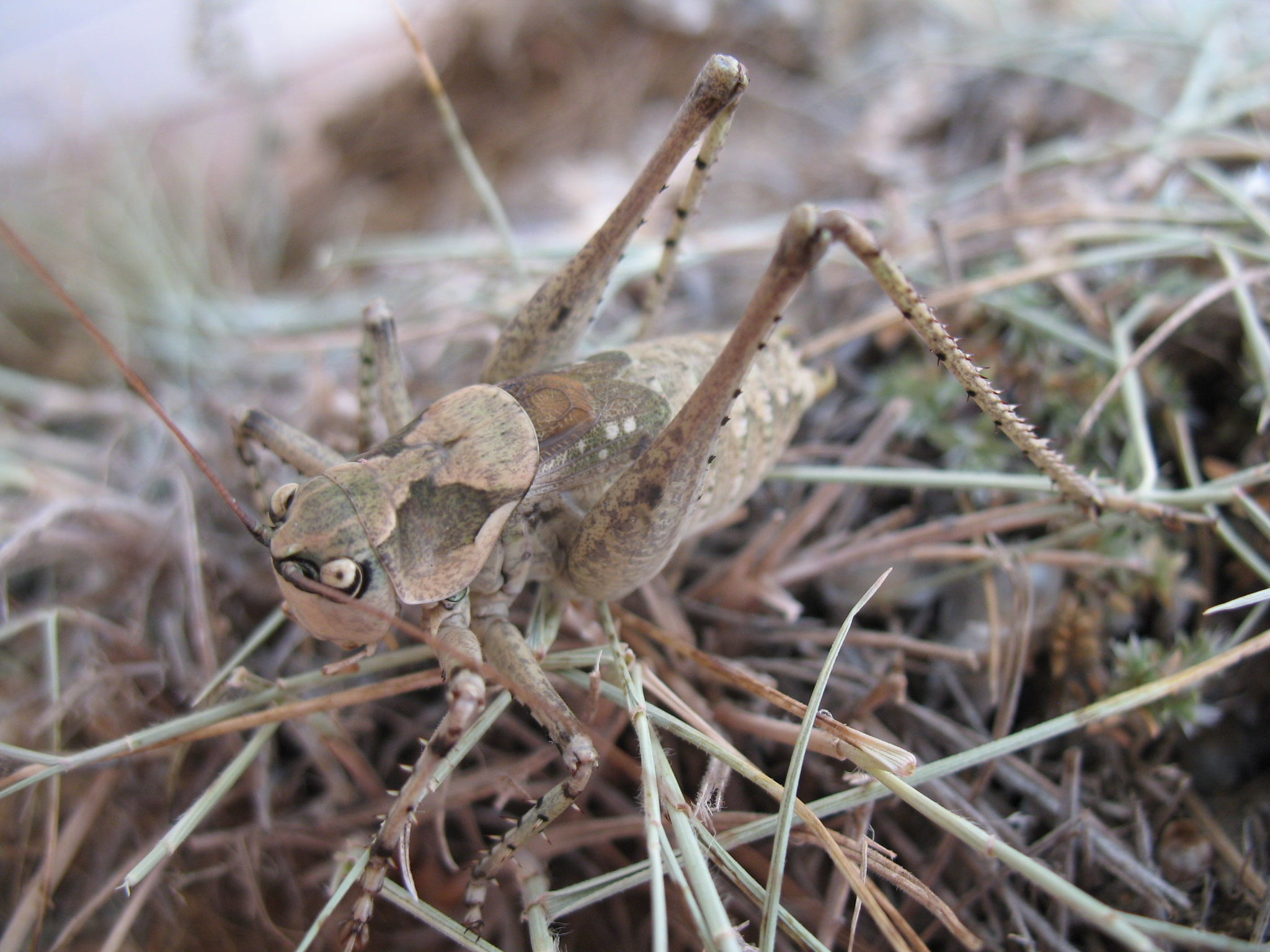
- Anadrymadusa retowskii male
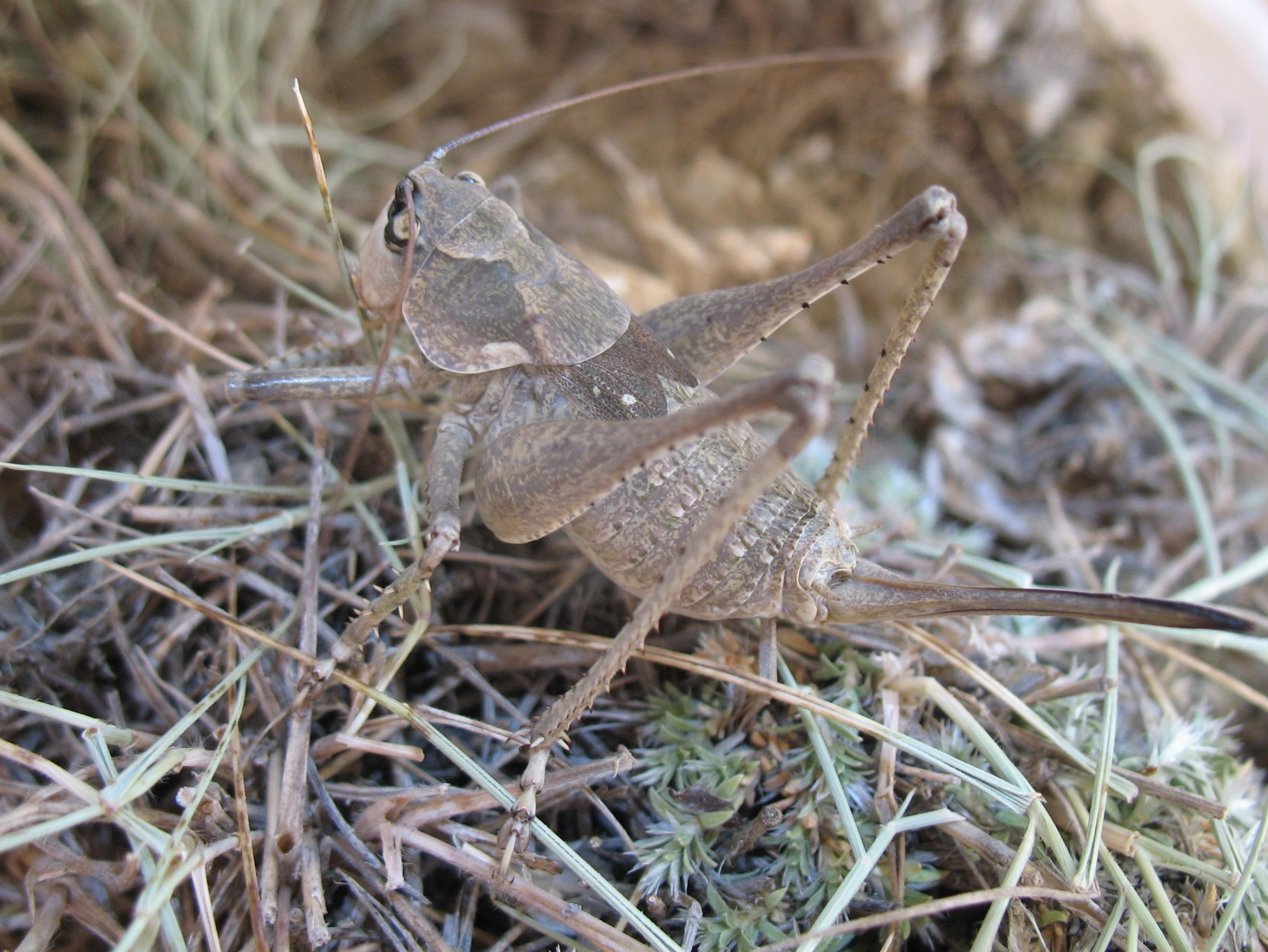
- A. retowskii female

Scientific classification
- Domain: Eukaryota
- Kingdom: Animalia
- Phylum: Arthropoda
- Class: Insecta
- Order: Orthoptera
- Suborder: Ensifera
- Family: Tettigoniidae
- Subfamily: Tettigoniinae
- Tribe: Drymadusini
- Genus: Anadrymadusa; Karabag, 1961

= Anadrymadusa =

Genus of cricket-like animals

External image
- Images at iNaturalist

Anadrymadusa is a genus of bush crickets in the tribe Drymadusini, erected by Tevfik Karabağ in 1961. Species have been recorded from Greece and Turkey through to Afghanistan.

== Species ==
The Orthoptera Species File lists:

subgenus Anadrymadusa Karabag, 1961

1. Anadrymadusa adzharica (Uvarov, 1934)
2. Anadrymadusa albomaculata (Karabag, 1956)
3. Anadrymadusa brevipennis (Brunner von Wattenwyl, 1882)
4. Anadrymadusa curvicercis (Uvarov, 1916)
5. Anadrymadusa danensis Karabag, 1972
6. Anadrymadusa kosswigi Karabag, 1975
7. Anadrymadusa modestalis Koçak & Kemal, 2010
8. Anadrymadusa ornatipennis (Ramme, 1926)
9. Anadrymadusa recticauda (Werner, 1903)
10. Anadrymadusa retowskii (Adelung, 1907)
11. Anadrymadusa spinicercis (Karabag, 1956) - type species (as Drymadusa spinicercis Karabag)

subgenus Orodusa Bey-Bienko, 1964

1. Anadrymadusa beckeri (Adelung, 1907)
2. Anadrymadusa robusta (Miram, 1926)

subgenus not assigned

1. Anadrymadusa jordanica Katbeh Bader & Massa, 2000
2. Anadrymadusa picta (Uvarov, 1929)
