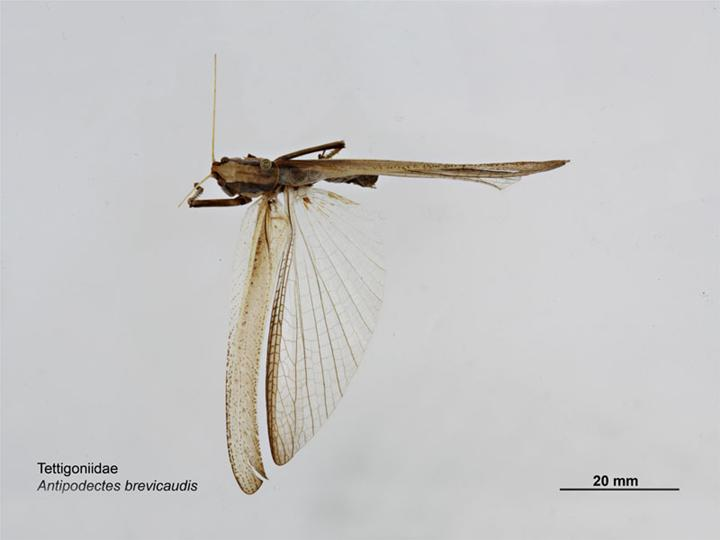
- Antipodectes brevicaudus

Scientific classification
- Domain: Eukaryota
- Kingdom: Animalia
- Phylum: Arthropoda
- Class: Insecta
- Order: Orthoptera
- Suborder: Ensifera
- Family: Tettigoniidae
- Subfamily: Tettigoniinae
- Tribe: Nedubini
- Genus: Antipodectes; Rentz, 1985

= Antipodectes =

Genus of insects

Antipodectes is a genus of katydids belonging to the family Tettigoniidae.

The species of this genus are found in Australia.

Species:

- Antipodectes bituberculatus D.C.F.Rentz, 1985
- Antipodectes brevicaudus D.C.F.Rentz, 1985
- Antipodectes giganteus D.C.F.Rentz, 1985
- Antipodectes graminicolus D.C.F.Rentz, 1985
- Antipodectes memorialis D.C.F.Rentz, 1985
- Antipodectes monteithi D.C.F.Rentz, 1985
- Antipodectes uncinatus D.C.F.Rentz, 1985
