= Amphiestris =

Scientific classification
- Domain: Eukaryota
- Kingdom: Animalia
- Phylum: Arthropoda
- Class: Insecta
- Order: Orthoptera
- Suborder: Ensifera
- Family: Tettigoniidae
- Subfamily: Tettigoniinae
- Tribe: Tettigoniini
- Genus: Amphiestris; Fieber, 1853

Genus of cricket-like animals

External image
- Images at iNaturalist

Amphiestris is a monotypic genus of European bush crickets in the tribe Tettigoniini, erected by Franz Xaver Fieber in 1853. Records of occurrence are from the Iberian Peninsula and North Africa.

== Species ==
The Orthoptera Species File includes the single species Amphiestris baetica (Rambur, 1838). Originally described as Barbitistes baetica by Jules Pierre Rambur, the type locality was in Andalusia.
