= Peranabrus =

Scientific classification
- Domain: Eukaryota
- Kingdom: Animalia
- Phylum: Arthropoda
- Class: Insecta
- Order: Orthoptera
- Suborder: Ensifera
- Family: Tettigoniidae
- Subfamily: Tettigoniinae
- Tribe: Platycleidini
- Genus: Peranabrus; Scudder, 1894
- Species: P. scabricollis

Binomial name
- Peranabrus scabricollis (Thomas, 1872)

Genus of cricket-like animals

Peranabrus is a genus of shield-backed katydids in the family Tettigoniidae. There is one described species in Peranabrus, P. scabricollis from North America.
