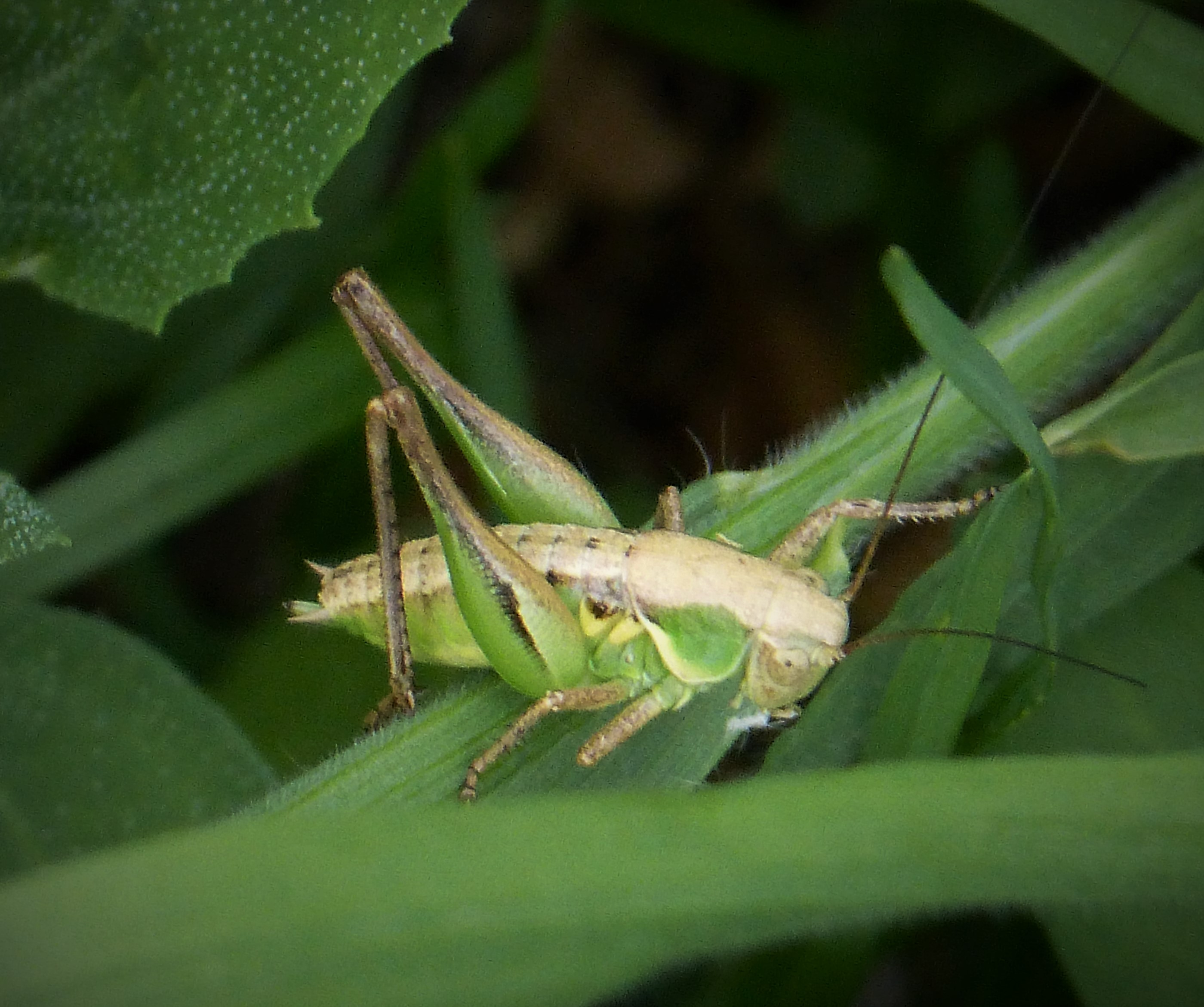
- Modestana sp. nymph

Scientific classification
- Domain: Eukaryota
- Kingdom: Animalia
- Phylum: Arthropoda
- Class: Insecta
- Order: Orthoptera
- Suborder: Ensifera
- Family: Tettigoniidae
- Subfamily: Tettigoniinae
- Tribe: Platycleidini
- Genus: Modestana; Beier, 1955

= Modestana =

Genus of cricket-like animals

External image
- Images at iNaturalist

Modestana is a genus of Palaearctic bush crickets in the tribe Platycleidini, erected by M. Beier in 1955. Species can be found in South-eastern Europe, with most records from Italy, the Balkans and Greece.

== Species ==
The Orthoptera Species File lists the following accepted species:

1. Modestana ebneri (Ramme, 1926)
2. Modestana modesta (Fieber, 1853) - type species (as Platycleis modestus Fieber)

Note: Modestana kraussi (Padewieth, 1900), the Croatian Meadow Bush-cricket, should now be placed in Bicolorana.
