= Acrodectes =

Scientific classification
- Domain: Eukaryota
- Kingdom: Animalia
- Phylum: Arthropoda
- Class: Insecta
- Order: Orthoptera
- Suborder: Ensifera
- Family: Tettigoniidae
- Subfamily: Tettigoniinae
- Tribe: Tettigoniini
- Genus: Acrodectes; Rehn & Hebard, 1920
- Species: A. philopagus

Binomial name
- Acrodectes philopagus Rehn & Hebard, 1920

Genus of cricket-like animals

Acrodectes is a genus of shield-backed katydids in the family Tettigoniidae. There is one described species in Acrodectes, A. philopagus.
