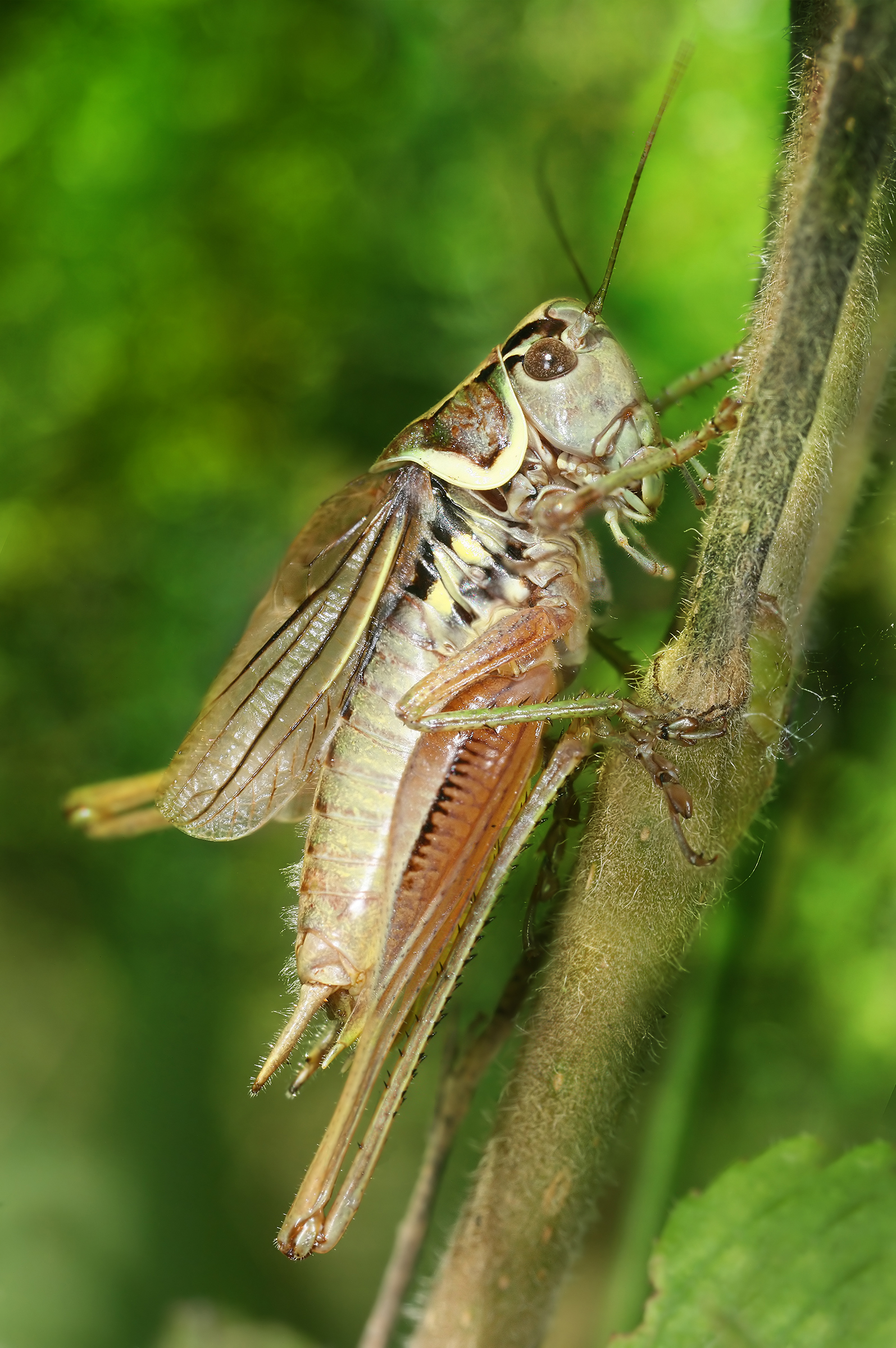
- Male
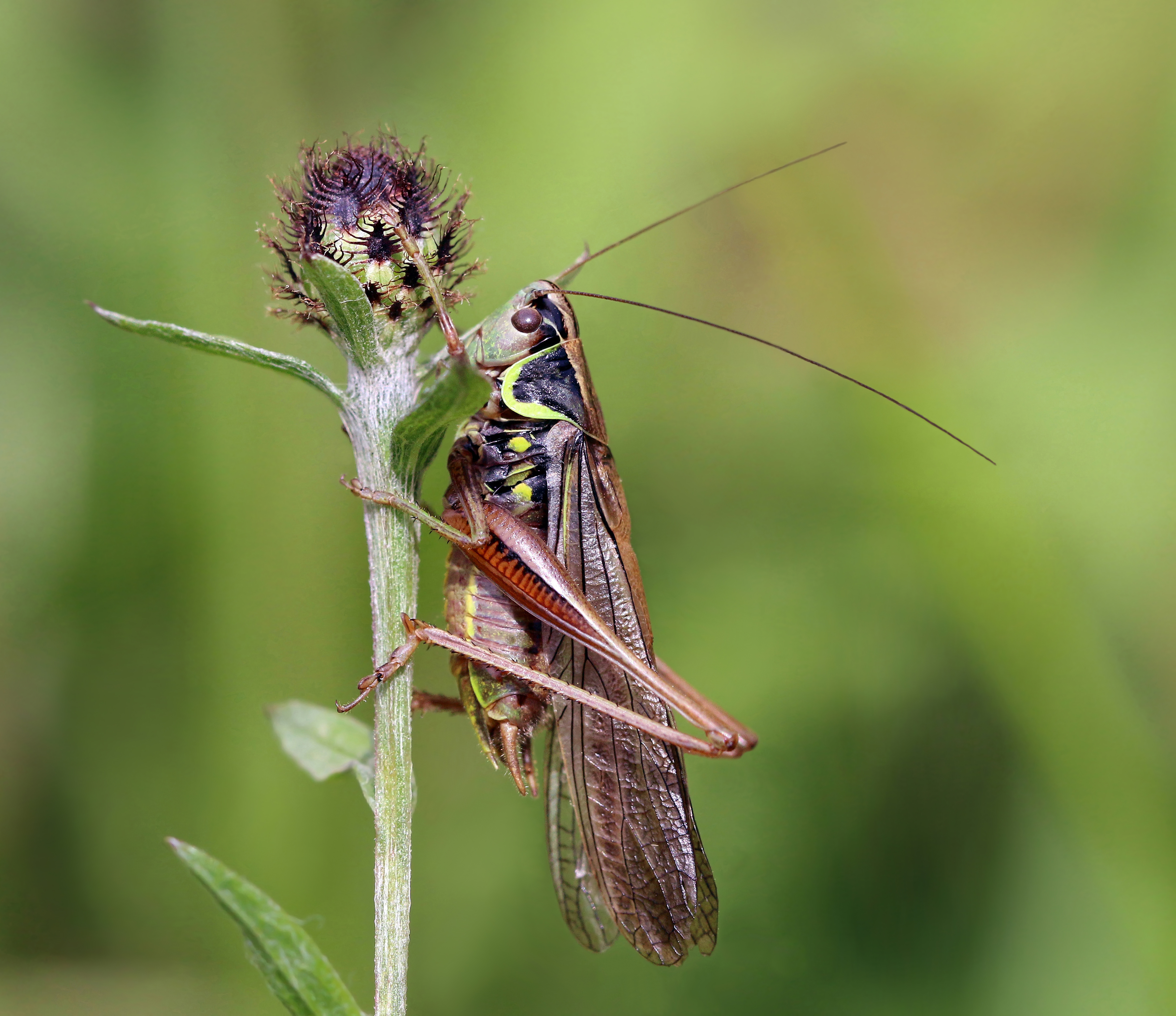
- Male subsp. diluta

Conservation status
- Least Concern (IUCN 3.1) (Europe regional assessment)

Scientific classification
- Kingdom: Animalia
- Phylum: Arthropoda
- Clade: Pancrustacea
- Class: Insecta
- Order: Orthoptera
- Suborder: Ensifera
- Family: Tettigoniidae
- Subfamily: Tettigoniinae
- Tribe: Platycleidini
- Genus: Roeseliana
- Species: R. roeselii

Binomial name
- Roeseliana roeselii (Hagenbach, 1822)

Synonyms
- Bicolorana roeselii roeselii; Metrioptera roeselii (Hagenbach, 1822); Locusta roeselii Hagenbach, 1822

= Roesel's bush-cricket =

Species of cricket-like animal

Close-Up of a Roeseliana roeseli

Roesel's bush-cricket (Roeseliana roeselii) (synonym Metrioptera roeselii) is a European bush-cricket, named after August Johann Rösel von Rosenhof, a German entomologist.

== Morphology ==
=== Adult insects ===
Adult Roesel's bush-crickets are medium-sized Tettigoniid between 13–26 mm in length. They are normally brown or yellow, often with a greenish shade and a rarer green form also sometimes occurs. An identifying feature is the yellow-green spots along the abdomen, just behind the pronotum, along with a matching margin along the border of the pronotum. This margin is entire, unlike the bog bush-cricket.

Males and females can be easily differentiated, as the females have a long sword-like ovipositor at the end of their abdomen, which the males lack.

=== Macropterous form ===
Both male and female adults are normally brachypterous. However, a macropterous form, f. diluta (described by Charpentier 1825) also exists. These have much longer wings, and usually make up less than 1% of the total population, but in some populations occur in much higher numbers, usually in areas where the bush-cricket's range has recently expanded to.

They are more common in long, warm summers where populations reach higher densities. It has also been suggested that a very localised hostile environment may also produce a higher level of macropterous forms. The macropterous form is a dispersal phase, and it provides the advantage of reaching new, more favourable habitats, within which there is a lower density of Roesel's bush-crickets residing. Well established populations tend to be more highly brachypterous, as high dispersal ability is correlated with lower fecundity in Orthoptera.

== Life history ==
Roesel's bush-crickets have only one generation every year. In the summer and autumn, the sword-like ovipositor of the female adult is used to cut open plant stems (usually grasses) and lay the egg pods within.

They emerge in May as nymphs. These must go through five or six instars before becoming adults. The final instar may be the most important in determining whether the insect develops as a brachypterous form or a macropterous form. It has been suggested that production of macropterous forms may be due to juvenile hormone (JH) degradation in the final instar, which leads to a shorter period of JH presence within the nymph. This allows more flight muscle and wing production during metamorphosis.

Adults tend to emerge in late June to early July. When the climate is mild enough, some can still be found at the end of October. Brachypterous forms disperse through the environment by walking along roadside grasses and ditches.

== Ecology and vegetation preferences ==
Vegetation structure and species both influence bush cricket distribution. Grass length is one of the key structural factors, as shorter grasses leave the bush crickets more at risk from predation and environmental disturbance, whereas longer grasses block out light. The height of grassland is also important in song propagation, and a higher position for stridulation is essential for many bush crickets as grasslands have a hampering effect on noise. Sward height preferences change depending on the time of year.

Roesel's bush-crickets have a preference for ungrazed meadows, with tall grass swards, which are a component of its diet. Other parts of their diet are grass seeds and smaller insects. They also have a preference for humidity, and thus require grasslands which remain reasonably undisturbed.

Due to its affinity for tall grasses, they can be found in a variety of habitats, including long swards at the edges of roads, field borders and pastures.

== Range ==
Roesel's bush-cricket is commonly found throughout southern and central Europe, as well as further North, in Finland, Latvia and Sweden. Its native range stretches from west Europe to western Siberia.

=== Status in Britain ===
Roesel's bush-cricket is native to Great Britain and Ireland. It is becoming one of the most commonly found Orthoptera in the British Isles, and makes up about 16% of records. It used to be found uniquely on the inland side of saltmarshes, and in coastal regions around estuaries, on the North Sea coast. It is becoming increasingly common in southeast England, as well as spreading further north. Over the past 50 years it has ranged further to the west, and large numbers have settled in areas of urban wasteland, especially near railways. It is generally found below 100 metres altitude. Extension to the species range has increased substantially since 1985.

=== Presence in North America ===
Despite being native to Europe, Roesel's bush-cricket has made its way into North America. It was first reported in Montreal and Ville St. Laurent by Urqhart and Baudry (1953) in Canada. Since then its range has increased in Ontario and Quebec, and into the United States as far as Illinois. It has been forecasted that Roesel's bush-cricket will disperse even further across eastern Canada and the United States, more likely limited to areas where grasslands are left relatively untouched across the year so as to allow the eggs to hatch.

== Song ==
Sound of Metrioptera roeselii
Field recording in the Netherlands 31s

Male adults start to sing (or stridulate) in July to attract females of the same species. Stridulation occurs for a long time (with only very brief pauses), whilst the weather is hot and sunny. The song is characteristic of the species which allows for easy identification by experts. The song consists of continuous penetrating buzzing, at a high pitch. The sound is similar to that of Savi's warbler, or the hiss of overhead electricity wires.

During the day, the male bush cricket moves to locations within the flora that lie in the sun, in an attempt to achieve the peak temperature for stridulation.

== Gallery ==
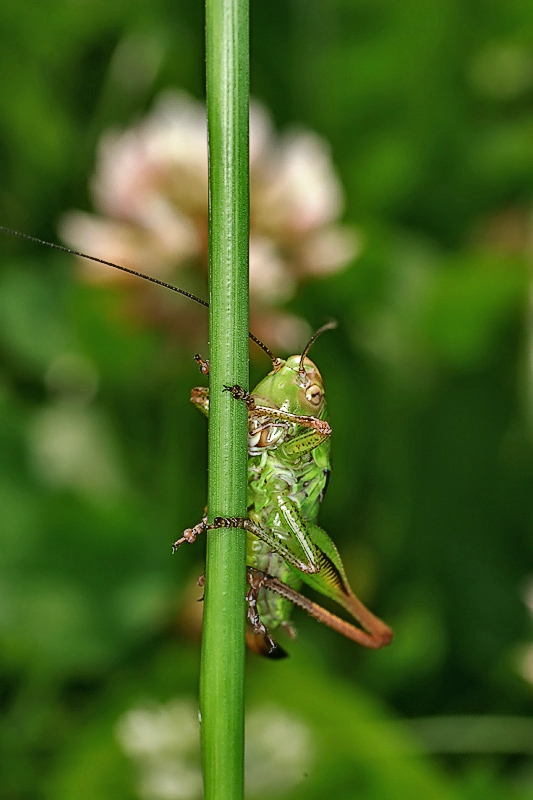
Female

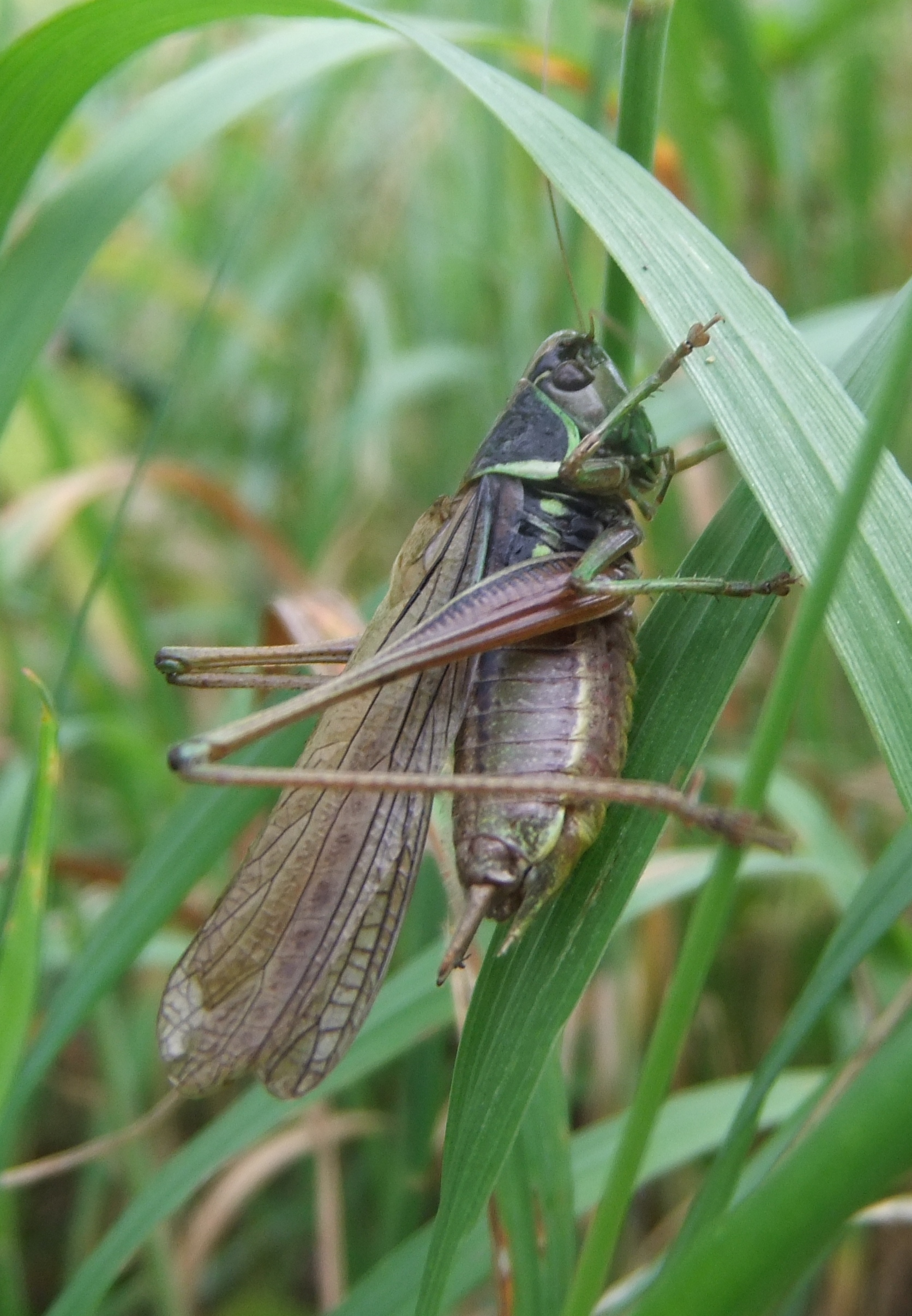
Macropterous form

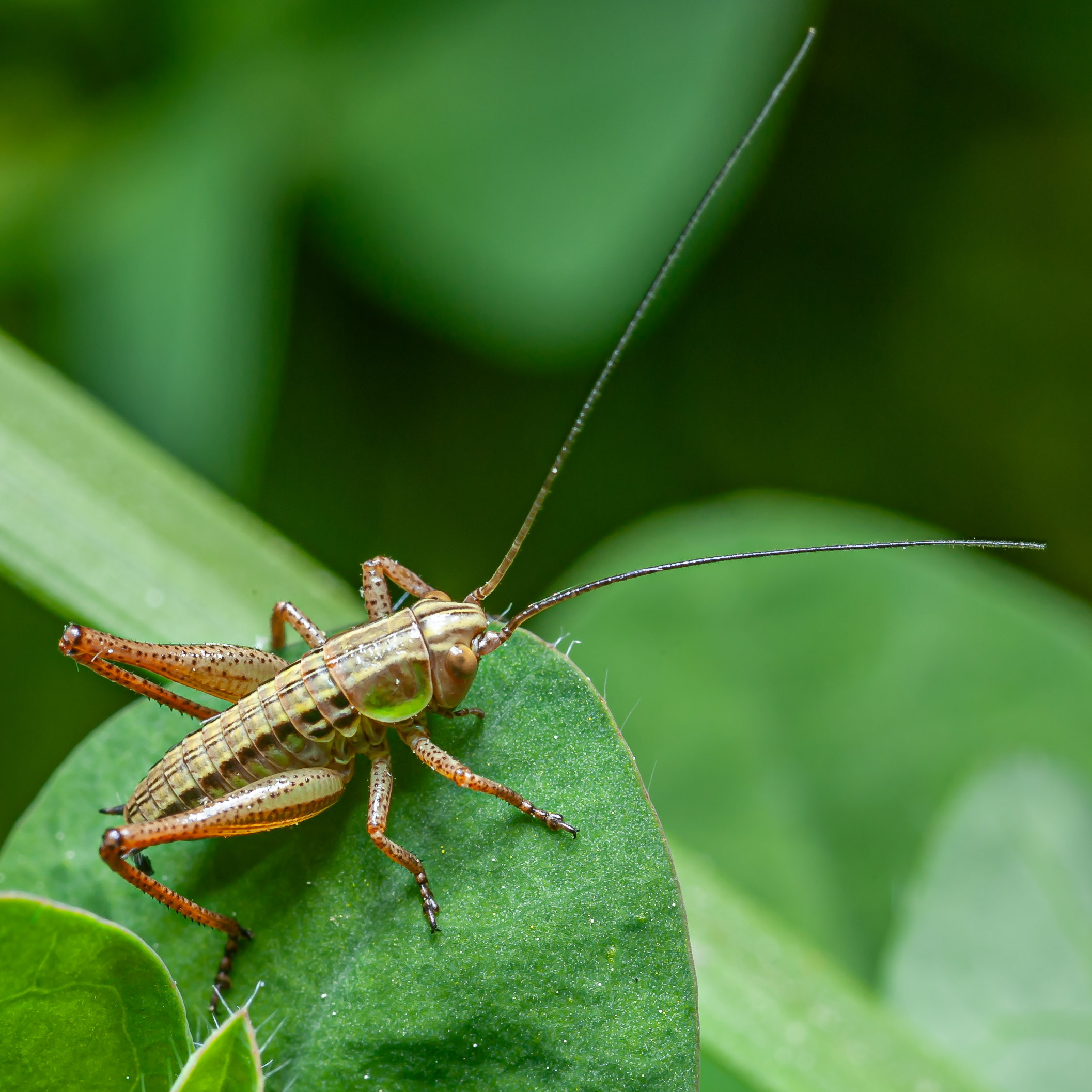
Nymph

Nymph
