= Goole Fields =

Civil parish in the East Riding of Yorkshire, England

Coordinates: 53.6752°N 0.8683°W

- Civil parish
- Population: 184 (2011 census)
- OS grid reference: SE748204
- Civil parish: Goole Fields
- Unitary authority: East Riding of Yorkshire
- Ceremonial county: East Riding of Yorkshire
- Region: Yorkshire and the Humber
- Country: England
- Sovereign state: United Kingdom
- Post town: GOOLE
- Postcode district: DN14
- Police: Humberside
- Fire: Humberside
- Ambulance: Yorkshire
- UK Parliament: Goole and Pocklington

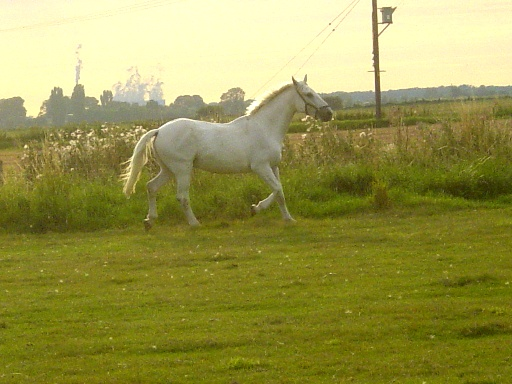
Moorland Major showing off in the flat fields of Goole Fields (Drax power station in the background)

Goole Fields is a civil parish in the East Riding of Yorkshire, England. It is situated approximately 3 miles (4.8 km) south-west of Goole town centre and lies at both sides but mainly south of the A161 road (Swinefleet Road), covering an area of 1,980.59 hectares (4,894.1 acres). It is bordered to the east by the Swinefleet Warping Drain, to the south by the Blackwater Dike, and to the west by the railway line from Goole to Doncaster.

== History ==
Goole Fields is in the north-western sector of the marshes of Hatfield Chase drained by the Netherlands civil engineer Cornelius Vermuyden in 1626–28. Before this diversion of the River Don, the area bore the name of Marshland—still occasionally used—or "Merscland" in the Domesday Book.

The civil parish contains no substantial centre of habitation but consists of a number of farms and a former council estate "The Square". There are no shops nor a church or even a post box. A phone box can however be found in "The Square" and there are a total of five street lamps. The only addresses in Goole Fields other than those referred to by farm name are "The Barracks" (formerly the site of a military barracks) and "The Square". The only mentionable landmarks in Goole Fields are the windmill and the recently heightened riverbank. In the late 1980s and early 1990s Goole Fields was the location of Goole Equestrian Centre which has since closed. There have been three Caravan Club rallies within Goole Fields (all in the 1990s).

In 2004 former Apple Recording artist Brute Force accompanied by the Birmingham group Misty's Big Adventure performed in Goole Fields. The performance consisted of a one-off recital of a song specially penned to celebrate the 30th birthday of the thoroughbred mare "Premier Bid". The event was covered in the Goole Times. (A recording of the event does exist!)

According to the 2011 UK census, Goole Fields parish had a population of 184, an increase on the 2001 UK census figure of 111.

The parish was part of the Goole Rural District in the West Riding of Yorkshire from 1894 to 1974, then in Boothferry district of Humberside until 1996.

A wind farm of 17 units: "Goole Fields II" was constructed in the area between 2012 and 2017.

=== Buildings ===
There are several listed buildings within the parish. Goole Hall is situated close to the A161 road, and is a rectangular house built in classical style in the 1820s for Jarvis Empson. It is built of red brick with dressings and chimneys of ashlar sandstone, with two storeys and a basement. It was extended in 1985–6, and is a grade II* listed structure. In the grounds are some grade II listed stables with a coachhouse, built at the same time, although the upper part of the coachhouse was removed and a new roof fitted in the twentieth century. Some 630 yards (580 m) to the south is Burying Hill, used as a graveyard for the Empson family who lived at the hall in the early eighteenth century. Although most of the early tombstones are broken, one to Ewan Empson, his two wives and daughter, dated 1728, is not, and is grade II listed.

Goole Mill is located to the east of the hall, and was a six-storey tower mill, built in the late eighteenth or early nineteenth centuries. It carries the date 1871, but this is thought to refer to the date on which Thomas Burke became the miller, rather than the date of construction. Only the tower remains, and all machinery has been removed. In addition, the farmhouses at Ash Tree, Field House, Ivy Lodge and Home Farms are all grade II listed.

=== Peat works ===
There was formerly a peat works to the north-west of Goole Hall. This was owned by William Smith and Son, who owned another works at Creyke's Siding. Peat was brought to the mill from the moors by a 3 ft (914 mm) gauge tramway, which ran alongside Earnshaw's Warping Drain and passed just to the east of Goole Grange. The tramway was about 3 miles (4.8 km) long, with a siding into the Grange. Motive power was provided by a steam locomotive, but no further details of the machine have been found. Both of Smith's mills were bought out by the British Peat Moss Litter company, which was formed in 1896 from an amalgamation of the Hatfield Chase Peat Moss Litter Company and several similar operations working on Thorne Moors. The mill continued to operate for only a few years, closing soon after 1902, although peat was stored there until 1914, and the buildings and tracks were not removed for many years afterwards.

=== Goole Moors ===
Part of the parish is designated as a site of special scientific interest under the name Thorne Crowle and Goole Moors. The site covers 1,918.6 hectares (4,741 acres) which form the largest lowland raised mire in England although it has been modified by peat cutting. The mire is very important due to its invertebrate fauna with several nationally rare insects, including crickets (Metrioptera brachiptera), moths (Orgyia recens), butterflies (Globiceps woodreftei), and beetles (Bembidion humerale).

== See also ==
- Listed buildings in Goole Fields

== Bibliography ==
- Booth, Adrian (1998). The Peat Railways of Thorne and Hatfield Moors. Industrial Railway Society. ISBN 978-1-90155604-9.
- Gazetteer — A–Z of Towns Villages and Hamlets. East Riding of Yorkshire Council. 2006. p. 6.
