= Metrioptera sphagnorum =

Scientific classification
- Kingdom: Animalia
- Phylum: Arthropoda
- Clade: Pancrustacea
- Class: Insecta
- Order: Orthoptera
- Suborder: Ensifera
- Family: Tettigoniidae
- Genus: Metrioptera
- Species: M. sphagnorum

Binomial name
- Metrioptera sphagnorum (F. Walker, 1869)

Species of cricket-like animal

Metrioptera sphagnorum, the bog katydid, is a species of shield-backed katydid in the family Tettigoniidae. It is found in North America.
