= Vichetia =

Scientific classification
- Domain: Eukaryota
- Kingdom: Animalia
- Phylum: Arthropoda
- Class: Insecta
- Order: Orthoptera
- Suborder: Ensifera
- Family: Tettigoniidae
- Subfamily: Tettigoniinae
- Tribe: Platycleidini
- Genus: Vichetia; Harz, 1969

Genus of cricket-like animals

External image
- Images at iNaturalist

Vichetia is a genus of Palaearctic bush crickets in the tribe Platycleidini. It was first erected as the subgenus Metrioptera (Vichetia) by K. Harz in 1969 and subsequently elevated to genus level in 2011: belonging to neither the Metrioptera nor the Platycleis genus groups.

Species have been recorded from eastern Europe, with most records from the Balkans through to Romania and Bulgaria.

== Species ==
The Orthoptera Species File lists the following accepted species:

1. Vichetia knipperi (Ramme, 1951)
2. Vichetia oblongicollis (Brunner von Wattenwyl, 1882) - type species (as Platycleis oblongicollis Brunner von Wattenwyl)
