= California, Berkshire =

Suburban village in Southern England

Coordinates: 51.377°N 0.873°W

California
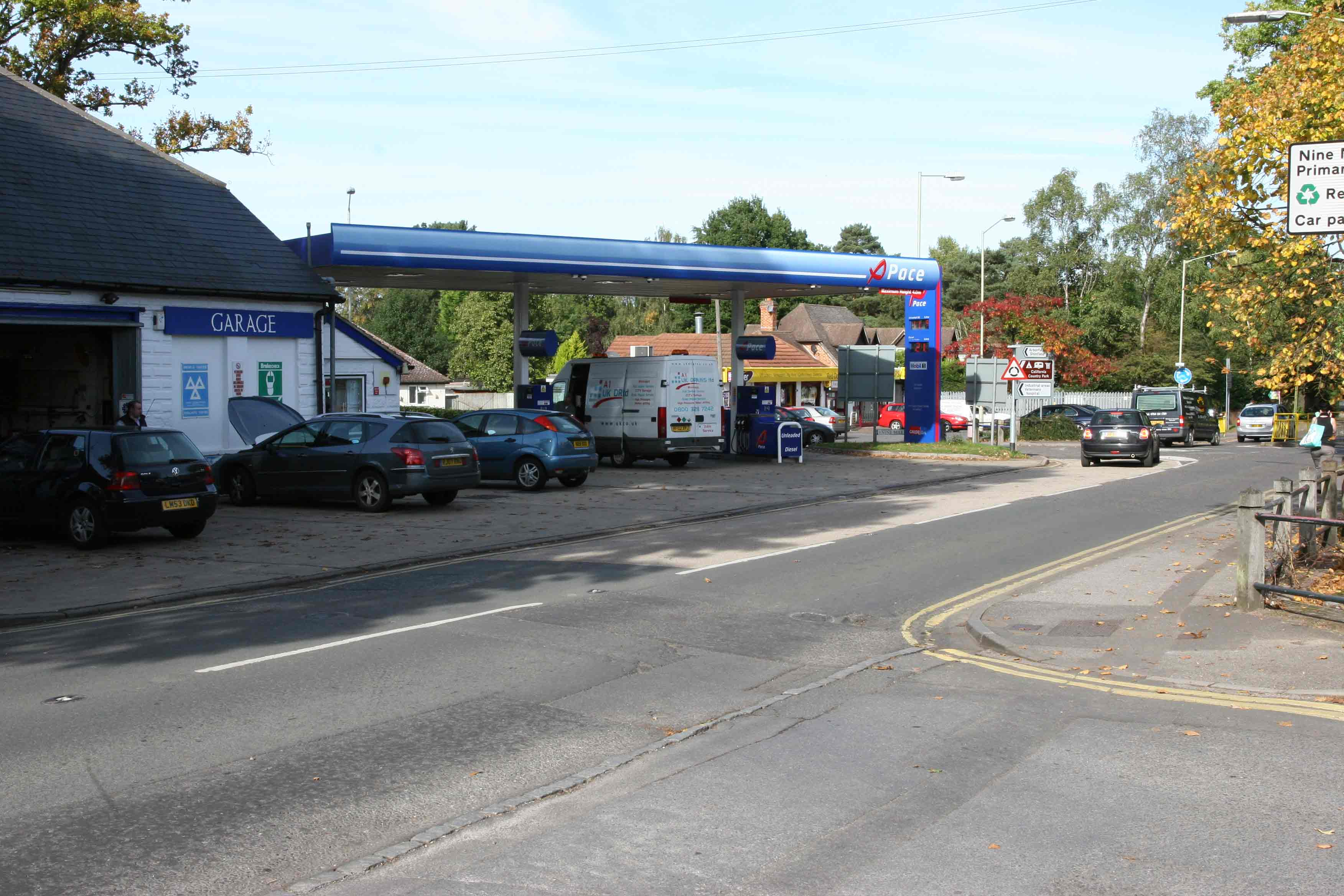
- California Crossroads

- Location within Berkshire
- Civil parish: Finchampstead
- Unitary authority: Wokingham
- Ceremonial county: Berkshire
- Region: South East
- Country: England
- Sovereign state: United Kingdom
- Post town: Reading
- Postcode district: RG2
- Dialling code: 0118
- Police: Thames Valley
- Fire: Royal Berkshire
- Ambulance: South Central
- UK Parliament: Wokingham
- Website: Finchampstead Parish Council

California is a village in the north of the civil parish of Finchampstead, in the Wokingham district, in the ceremonial county of Berkshire. It is situated approximately 1.9 mi (3.1 km) south of Wokingham.

== Amenities ==
There are local shops, restaurants, a chemist, post office and petrol station, doctor's surgery and Ratepayers Hall at California Crossroads.

Nine Mile Ride Primary and Gorse Ride Schools school serve the California end of the parish. Nine Mile Ride has approximately 350 children.

St Mary and St John California is a Church of England church which meets at Gorse Ride Junior School in California. It replaced the old Army church on the Nine Mile Ride. It is a shared ministry with St James' at Finchampstead.

In the early 21st century, the congregation of the Baptist Church at Finchampstead outgrew its capacity and they began worshipping at Waverley School in California instead. In April 2010 the new Finchampstead Baptist Church Centre was opened in Gorse Ride North in California. The centre was built by Finchampstead Baptist Church in partnership with Wokingham Borough Council and Finchampstead Parish Council. The centre provides a cafe, sports hall and conference rooms for community use and is used by an increasing number of community groups.

The place is best known for its country park, centred on Longmoor Lake, on the edge of Barkham Common. As well as the Jackson's Cafe situated by the lake.

== Housing ==
California is a large residential village. Most of Finchampstead parish's housing is located there, most notably the Fernlea Estate, built on private farmland, and the Gorse Ride estate, built on the site of a watercress farm and gorse woodland. Gorse Ride South estate was built as a temporary measure for only 10 years. The properties consist of terraced houses and terraced bungalows. All were designed by the Ministry of Housing known as MOHLG construction. The properties have textured plywood outer wall panels and solid concrete foundations. Although only designed for a lifespan of 10 years, all the dwellings are now permanent properties, after being refurbished in 1977 with timber cladding on the external plywood walls, and tiled roofs over the previous felt roofs. By the 2010s, some of the council housing on the Gorse Ride South estate had fallen into disrepair. The houses have structural problems and poor drainage, and the bungalows have insulation and subsidence issues. In an effort to improve the estate, the large FBC community centre opened in 2010. As of 2018, Wokingham Borough Council has secured funding to redevelop the entire estate, starting 2018. As of 2021, demolition has started on part of the estate at Dart Close and Firs Close.

== History ==
Warren Wood is a secondary woodland of birch, oak and pine with a large meadow, between Nine Mile Ride and Warren Lane. It includes a scheduled monument, a round burial mound, which is the largest example of a bell barrow in Berkshire and dates from between 2000 and 1300 BC. Trees have been removed from the mound in recent years as their roots can damage archaeological remains and paths have been re-routed around the mound.

The area between California and Crowthorne is sometimes known 'The Rides' due to several straight roads cut through this part of Windsor Forest by Queen Anne and King George III. Others include Barkham Ride, Heath Ride and Gorse Ride.

The area stands on London clay and, to the west, there was a small brickworks around Kiln Ride, with a light railway connecting it to the railway between Wokingham and Crowthorne. It was called the California Brickworks and the village is named after it.

Longmoor Lake at California Country Park was expanded from a small pond by John Walter for the building of Bearwood House. The country park was originally a famous holiday camp, called 'California in England', complete with glass-floored pavilion and speedway racetrack. The track was known as Longmoor before the Second World War and was used for training. After the Second World War the track was home for the team known as California Poppies which raced in the Southern Area League. Annual reunions are now staged at the site of the track.

== Natural environment ==
The village has a nature reserve on its edge called Shepperlands Farm Nature Reserve.

The village also has a Site of Special Scientific Interest (SSSI) and Local Nature Reserve called Longmoor Bog, which is part of California Country Park.
