= California Country Park =

Country park in Berkshire, England

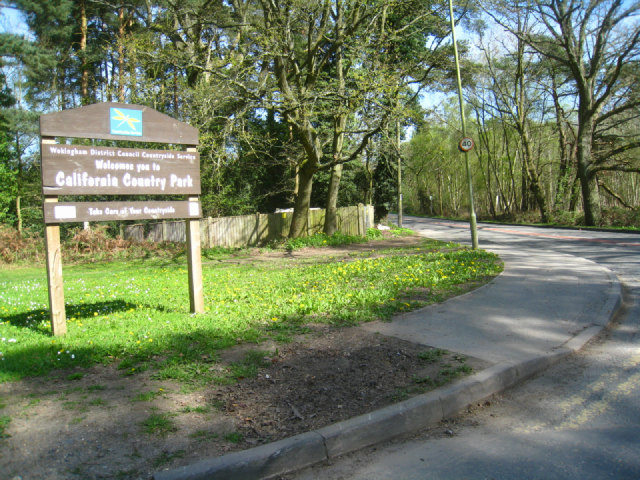
- California Country Park entrance
- Interactive map of California Country Park
- Type: country park
- Location: California , Berkshire; England
- Coordinates: 51.3795°N 0.8745°W
- Created: 1931
- Operator: Wokingham Borough Council
- Status: Open all year

California Country Park is a 100-acre (40 ha) country park covering Long Moor at California, Berkshire, England. It consists of lowland heath and bogland, including Longmoor Bog, a Site of Special Scientific Interest (SSSI) and Local Nature Reserve. The park is managed by Wokingham Borough Council and is open every day throughout the year.

== Geography ==
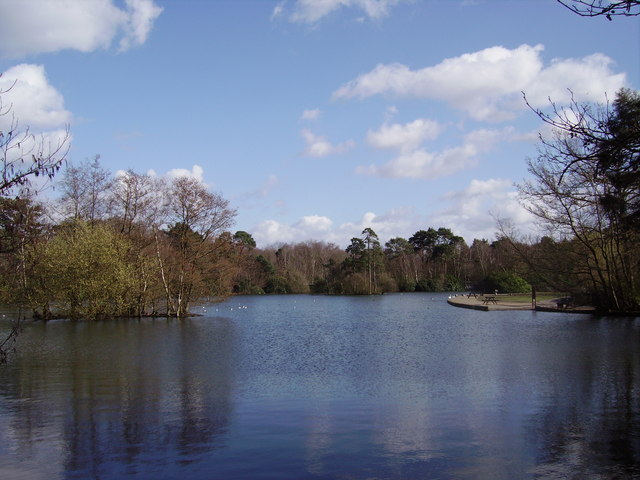
Longmoor Lake at California Country Park

The country park is situated approximately 3 kilometres (1.9 mi) south of Wokingham and is bounded by Arborfield Garrison to the west, California to the east, the Nine Mile Ride to the south, and what was once Barkham common to the north. The site covers 150 acres (61 ha) features a six-acre (2.4 ha) lake.

The park features a ferruginous swamp, Longmoor Bog, caused by a bacterium that deposits rust-coloured iron hydroxide.

== History ==
In 1931, it was established as an amusement park and zoo by Alfred Cartlidge and was called 'California in England'. Cartlidge built the park so that he could use his Teddington-based Charabanc company to take parties of people from London to the countryside. The miniature railway was initially laid out to ten and a quarter inch (260 mm) gauge but was soon changed to 18 inch (460 mm) and this lasted until the outbreak of the Second World War when the park closed and all the buildings were used for the manufacture of munitions for the aircraft industry. Cartlidge reopened the park after the war and set about developing the rides many of which were designed and built onsite, including the Snake Train. The railway was re-established as 18 inch gauge using a petrol-powered locomotive. His son, Norman, took over in the early 1950s and continued the development of the site. At this time, the original miniature railway terminus station was moved to the outer north-western edge of the extended play and rides area. The track was extended across the bog and had a point installed with the intention of constructing a loop. Trackwork was never completed beyond the apex of the loop, and it is here that after the park closed the last loco on the line was run off into the swamp. The cleared area between the railway and the original rides was developed with extra rides. There was a small carousel, a full size chairoplane, climbing frame, swing boats, and a concrete oval track. The latter was initially intended for petrol driven go-karts but these were replaced by children's pedal cars of the Austin J40 and Pathfinder type. The removal of the original railway station opened up access to a further area of scrub which was cleared to provide a site for a circus which operated each summer for several years. The Art Deco main building, built around 1937, included a sprung glass-floored ballroom over the restaurant. This structure was destroyed by fire in 1976.

From the 1930s to the 1950s the park was home to a speedway track. The Reading and District Motor Club ran a series of meetings in 1939, on the dirt track laid out in a remote corner of the estate. Later from 1954 to 1956, a local speedway team, the California Poppies, rode on the track.

In the early 1960s the amusement business was failing and the site obtained new owners who turned it into a holiday camp. Caravan and camping facilities are still available on site at the California Chalet and Touring Park but the main part of the original amusement area is within the country park and now largely overgrown.

== Fauna ==
The park has the following animals

=== Birds ===
- Cormorant
- Canada goose
- Mallard
- Coot
- Moorhen
- Swan
- Egyptian goose

=== Invertebrates ===
- Bog bush cricket
- Common Copper Butterfly
- Dragonfly
- Damselfly

=== Reptiles ===
- Vipera berus
- Common lizard (Zootoca vivipara)

=== Amphibian ===
- Palmate newt

== Flora ==
The park has the following flora:

=== Trees ===
- Alnus glutinosa
- Rowan
- Quercus robur
- Hazel
- Aspen

=== Plants ===
- Mentha pulegium
- Centaurea nigra
- Rorippa palustris
- Circaea lutetiana
- Molinia caerulea
- Juncus effusus
- Juncus acutiflorus
- Juncus inflexus
- Calluna
- Potentilla erecta
- Lotus pedunculatus
- Potamogeton polygonifolius
- Carex rostrata
- Cirsium palustre
- Equisetum fluviatile
- Iris pseudacorus
- Angelica sylvestris
- Lycopus europaeus
- Dactylorhiza fuchsii
- Frangula alnus
- Dryopteris dilatata
- Blechnum spicant
- Glyceria declinata
- Menyanthes
- Lythrum salicaria
- Ranunculus flammula
- Hypericum pulchrum
- Persicaria maculosa
- Stellaria graminea
- Epilobium parviflorum
- Gnaphalium uliginosum
- Achillea ptarmica
- Typha latifolia
- Alisma plantago-aquatica
- Impatiens glandulifera
- Rhododendron

=== Bryophyte ===
- Sphagnum

=== Lichen ===
- Peltigera membranacea

== Facilities ==
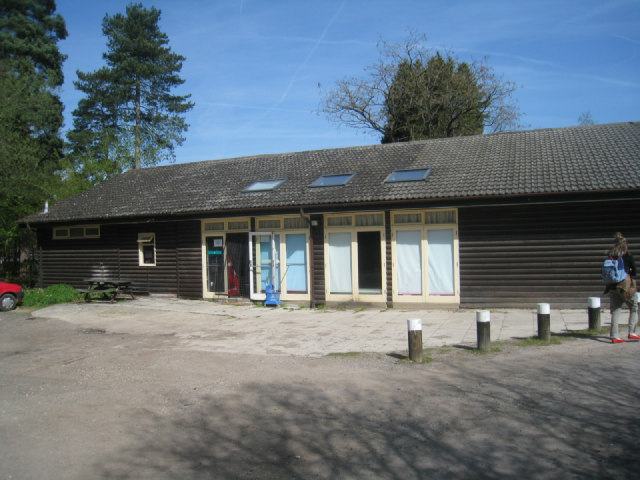
California Country Park Cafe

As well as offering walks and wildlife watching, especially around Longmoor Lake, there is a cafe, summer paddling pool, toddler swings and an adventure play area. A 5k parkrun started on 23 February 2019 and takes place every Saturday at 9.00am.

== See also ==
- List of Sites of Special Scientific Interest in Berkshire
