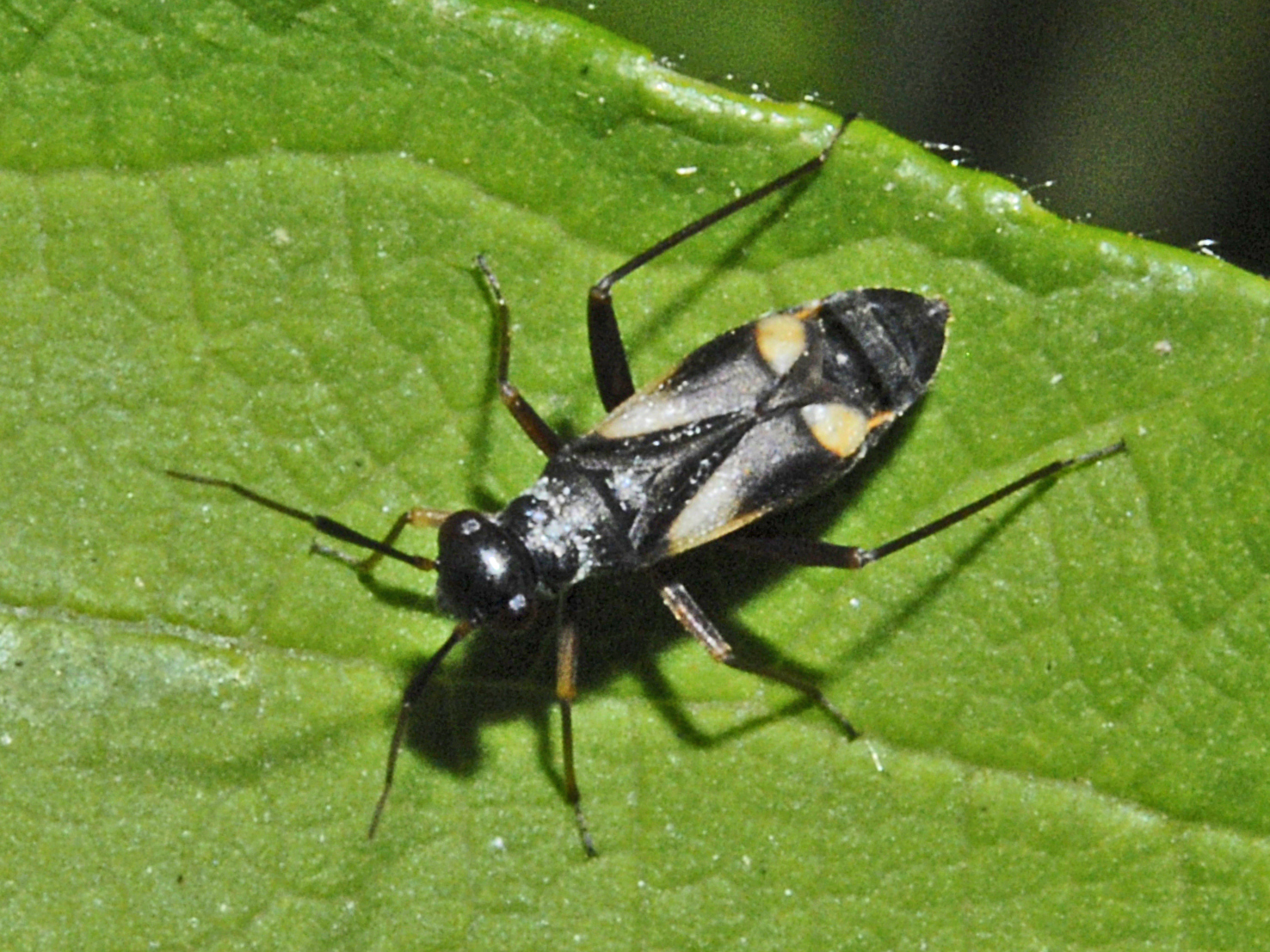
- Globiceps fulvicollis, female

Scientific classification
- Kingdom: Animalia
- Phylum: Arthropoda
- Class: Insecta
- Order: Hemiptera
- Suborder: Heteroptera
- Family: Miridae
- Genus: Globiceps
- Species: G. fulvicollis

Binomial name
- Globiceps fulvicollis Jakovlev, 1877

Synonyms
- Globiceps cruciatus Reuter, 1879

= Globiceps fulvicollis =

Species of true bug

Globiceps fulvicollis is a species of plant-feeding insect of the family Miridae.

== Distribution and habitat ==
This species is present in most European countries and the northern Mediterranean to Central Asia These bugs mainly live in hedge rows, open areas, dune slacks and damp heaths.

== Description ==
Globiceps fulvicollis can reach a length of 5.2–6.1 millimetres (0.20–0.24 in) in males, of 4.4–5.6 millimetres (0.17–0.22 in) in females. These bugs are mainly black, with pale yellow wide markings. Females have a relatively wide head and very reduced wings (brachyptery), with hemelytra non covering the apex of the abdomen.

This species is very similar to Dryophilocoris flavoquadrimaculatus.

== Biology ==
Adults can be found from June to September, depending on the location. These polyphagous insects mainly feed on juices or nectar of Cytisus scoparius, Vaccinium myrtillus, Calluna vulgaris and Tanacetum vulgare.
