= Vichetia oblongicollis =

Conservation status
- Least Concern (IUCN 3.1)

Scientific classification
- Kingdom: Animalia
- Phylum: Arthropoda
- Class: Insecta
- Order: Orthoptera
- Suborder: Ensifera
- Family: Tettigoniidae
- Genus: Vichetia
- Species: V. oblongicollis

Binomial name
- Vichetia oblongicollis (Brunner von Wattenwyl, 1882)

Synonyms
- Bicolorana oblongicollis (Brunner von Wattenwyl, 1882); Chelidoptera oblongicollis (Brunner von Wattenwyl, 1882); Metrioptera oblongicollis (Brunner von Wattenwyl, 1882); Pholidoptera albanica Csiki, 1922; Platycleis oblongicollis Brunner von Wattenwyl, 1882

Species of bush cricket

Vichetia oblongicollis, the oblong meadow bush-cricket, is a palaearctic bush cricket in the family Tettigoniidae. It has been recorded in the Balkans.
