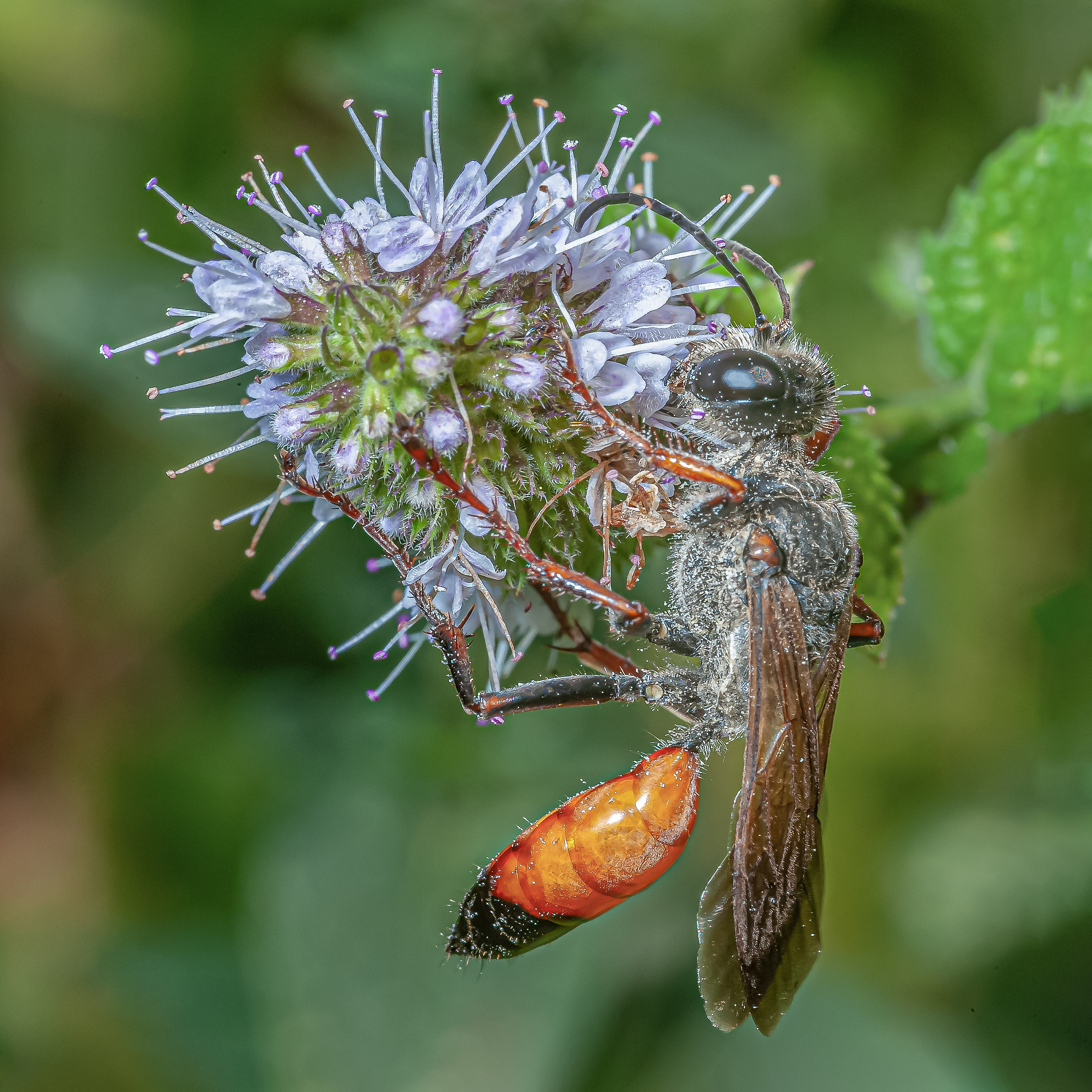

Scientific classification
- Kingdom: Animalia
- Phylum: Arthropoda
- Class: Insecta
- Order: Hymenoptera
- Family: Sphecidae
- Genus: Sphex
- Species: S. funerarius

Binomial name
- Sphex funerarius Gussakovskij, 1934

Synonyms
- Sphex maxillosus Fabricius, 1793; Sphex rufocinctus Brullé, 1833

= Sphex funerarius =

Species of wasp

Sphex funerarius, the golden digger wasp, is a species of digger wasp of the family Sphecidae.

== Description ==
Sphex funerarius can reach a length of 15–23 millimetres (0.59–0.91 in). These large, solitary, ground-nesting wasps are black with an orange-red large band on the anterior abdomen. On the head and the body there is fine and thin hair. Wings are yellowish with darkened tops of the front wings.

== Ecology and life cycle ==
The larvae feed on living insects that the females paralyze and carry to the underground nest. The females of these digger wasps store several grasshoppers in a nest. They dig a 15 cm long corridor, with various brood chambers, in each of which one prey is stored with an egg. The preys are normally orthopteran insects, particularly nymphs of locusts or katydids. After three to four days, the eggs hatch and after another 18 days, the larvae are fully grown. Adults fly in July and August. They feed on the nectar of flowers (Apiaceae, Euphorbiaceae, etc.).

== Distribution ==
This species is present in southern and central parts of Europe and spread eastward to Central Asia.

== Gallery ==
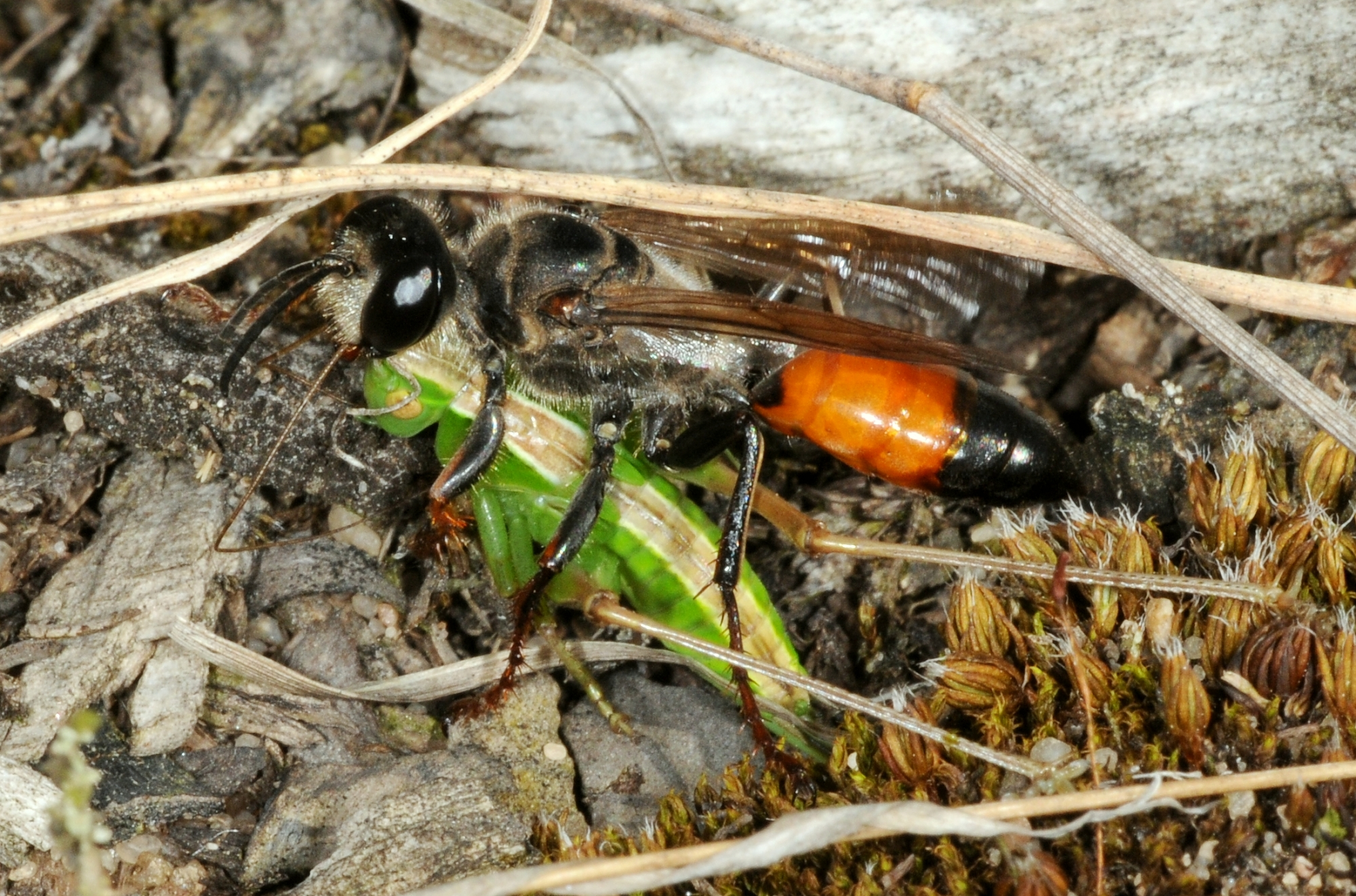
Sphex funerarius with Bicolorana bicolor as prey

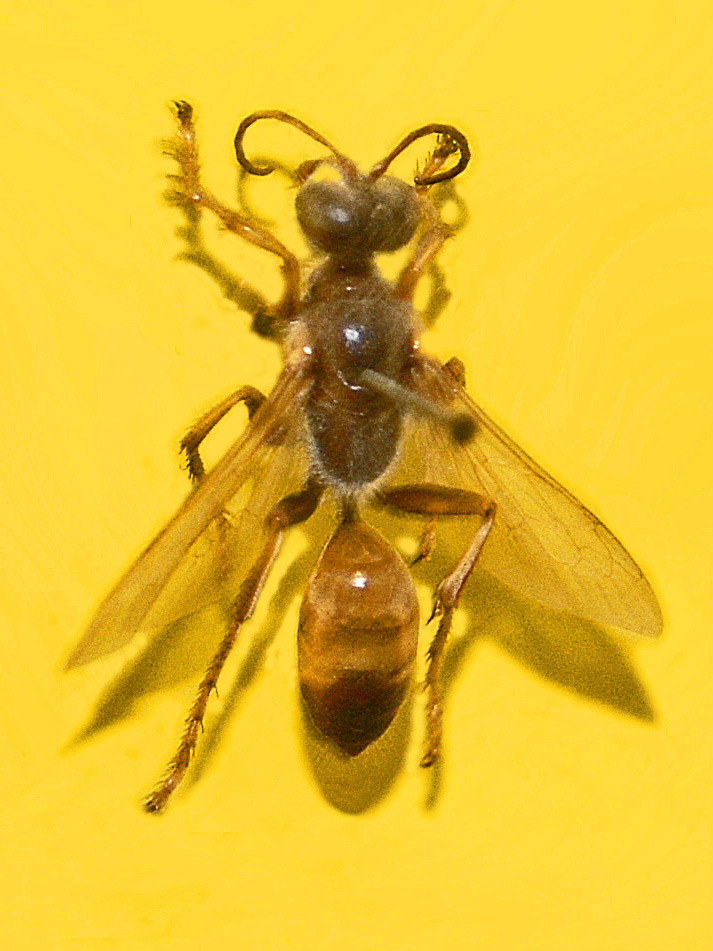
Sphex funerarius. Museum specimen

Sphex funerarius digging and introducing prey into its nest
