= Goole Mill =

Windmill in Goole Fields, East Riding of Yorkshire, England

Coordinates: 53°40′58″N 0°51′18″W

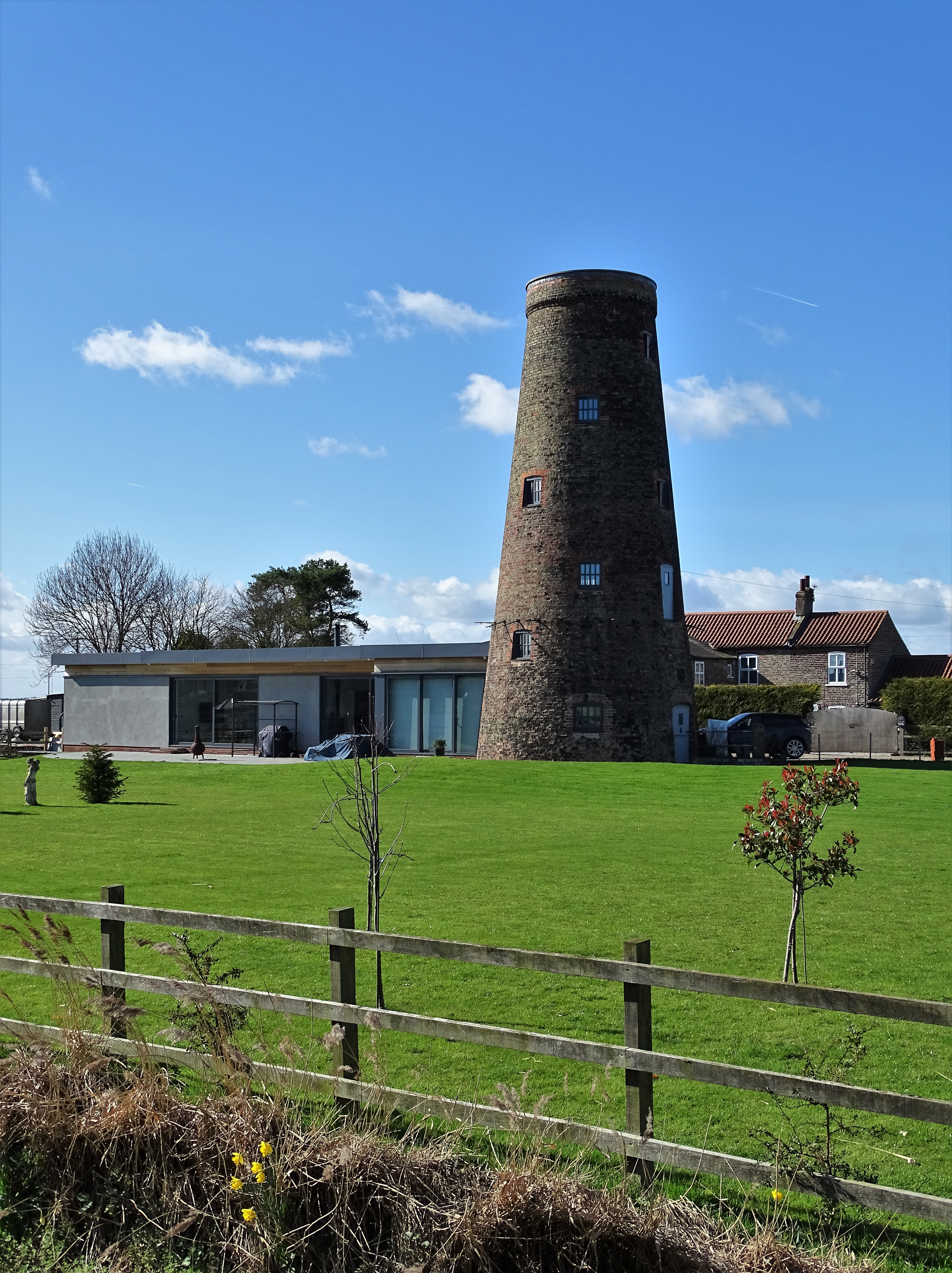
The building, in 2019

Goole Mill, also known as Goole Fields Mill, is a historic building in Goole Fields, a hamlet in the East Riding of Yorkshire, in England.

The windmill was built around 1800, north of the Dutch River and the settlement now known as Old Goole. In 1826, the Aire and Calder Navigation opened and work started on the Port of Goole. The mill was demolished and rebuilt further south by 1828. Thomas Burke took over the mill in 1871, and made some alterations. The mill later closed and the machinery was removed, the building falling into disrepair but then being restored. It has been grade II listed since 1986.

The tower windmill is built of brown brick, with orange brick dressings, a stepped and cogged brick eaves cornice, and a toothed iron curb. It consists of a tapered round tower with six storeys. The tower contains doorways on the lower three storeys, windows on all storeys, and an inserted datestone on the north face reading "1871".

== See also ==
- Listed buildings in Goole Fields
