= Listed buildings in Goole Fields =

Goole Fields is a civil parish in the county of the East Riding of Yorkshire, England. It contains seven listed buildings that are recorded in the National Heritage List for England. Of these, one is listed at Grade II*, the middle of the three grades, and the others are at Grade II, the lowest grade. The parish is a rural area to the south of the town of Goole, and contains no significant settlements. The listed buildings consist of a large house and associated structures, farmhouses and a former windmill.

== Key ==
Grade	Criteria
II*	Particularly important buildings of more than special interest
II	Buildings of national importance and special interest

== Buildings ==
Name and location	Photograph	Date	Notes	Grade
Tombstone; 53.68005°N 0.86390°W	—	1758	The tombstone is in a former graveyard in a field to the south of the house. It consists of a stone with a coat of arms carved in relief above an illuminated inscription.	II
Field House Farmhouse; 53.67969°N 0.84226°W	—	Late 18th century	The farmhouse is in brown brick, and has a Welsh slate roof with stone coped gables and shaped kneelers. There are two storeys and attics, and an L-shaped plan, with a front range of three bays. The central doorway has pilasters, an entablature, a fanlight in a panelled reveal, and a hood. The windows are casements, on the front with painted rubbed brick flat arches, and on the left return with stucco flat arches.	II
Goole Mill windmill tower 53.68289°N 0.85513°W		Late 18th to early 19th century	The former windmill is in brown brick, with orange brick dressings, a stepped and cogged brick eaves cornice, and a toothed iron curb. It consists of a tapered round tower with six storeys. The tower contains doorways on the lower three storeys, windows on all storeys, and an inserted datestone on the north face.	II
Goole Hall; 53.68479°N 0.86088°W	—	c. 1820	A large house, later used for other purposes, it is in red brick, with sandstone dressings, chamfered rustication on the basement, a floor band, sill bands, a moulded cornice, a blocking course and a flat Westmorland slate roof, hipped on the sides. There are two storeys and a basement, and a rectangular plan, with a front of five bays, the middle bay projecting. Seven steps lead to an Ionic porch with fluted columns and pilasters, an entablature, a modillion cornice, a flat roof and a balcony with a cast iron balustrade. The doorway has a rusticated surround, a fanlight and a ribbed frieze. The windows are sashes, those on the ground floor in reveals, with flat lintels, corniced hoods on scrolled consoles, and recessed panelled decorated aprons. The window above the balcony has an architrave and a hood on consoles.	II*
Stables and coach house, Goole Hall; 53.68421°N 0.86044°W	—	c. 1820	The stables and coach house, to the southeast of the house, are in brown brick with red rubbed-brick dressings, a Yorkshire slate roof on the stables, and an asbestos roof on the coach house. The stables have two storeys and five bays, with a blind arcaded front and a central round-arched entrance. They are linked by a stone-coped brick wall on the left to the lower coach house that has two storeys and one bay.	II
Ash Tree Farmhouse; 53.67761°N 0.85001°W	—	Early to mid-19th century	The farmhouse is in brick, and has a Welsh slate roof with stone coped gables and shaped kneelers. There are two storeys and attics, a double depth plan, and three bays. The central doorway has ribbed pilasters, an entablature, a fanlight in an architrave and reveal, and a hood. On the ground floor are 20th-century windows with channelled stucco cambered arches and fluted keystones. On the upper floor are sash windows in reveals, and the returns have horizontally sliding sashes.	II
Ivy Lodge Farmhouse; 53.67610°N 0.85866°W	—	1854	The farmhouse is in red brick on the front, brown brick elsewhere, with stone dressings and a hipped Welsh slate roof. There are two storeys, a double depth plan, and three bays. On the centre is a stone Tuscan porch with attached columns, an entablature and a pediment, and a doorway with a two-light fanlight, and side lights in panelled reveals and soffit. The windows are sashes in architraves and reveals, with channelled cambered wedge lintels and keystones. On the right return is an initialled datestone.	II
