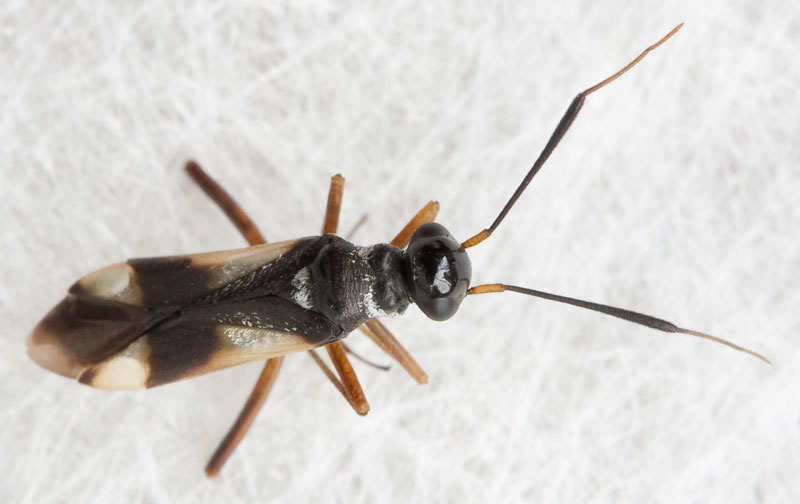
- Globiceps flavomaculatus, Finland

Scientific classification
- Kingdom: Animalia
- Phylum: Arthropoda
- Class: Insecta
- Order: Hemiptera
- Suborder: Heteroptera
- Family: Miridae
- Genus: Globiceps
- Species: G. flavomaculatus

Binomial name
- Globiceps flavomaculatus (Fabricius, 1794)

= Globiceps flavomaculatus =

Species of true bug

Globiceps flavomaculatus is a Palearctic species of true bug.
