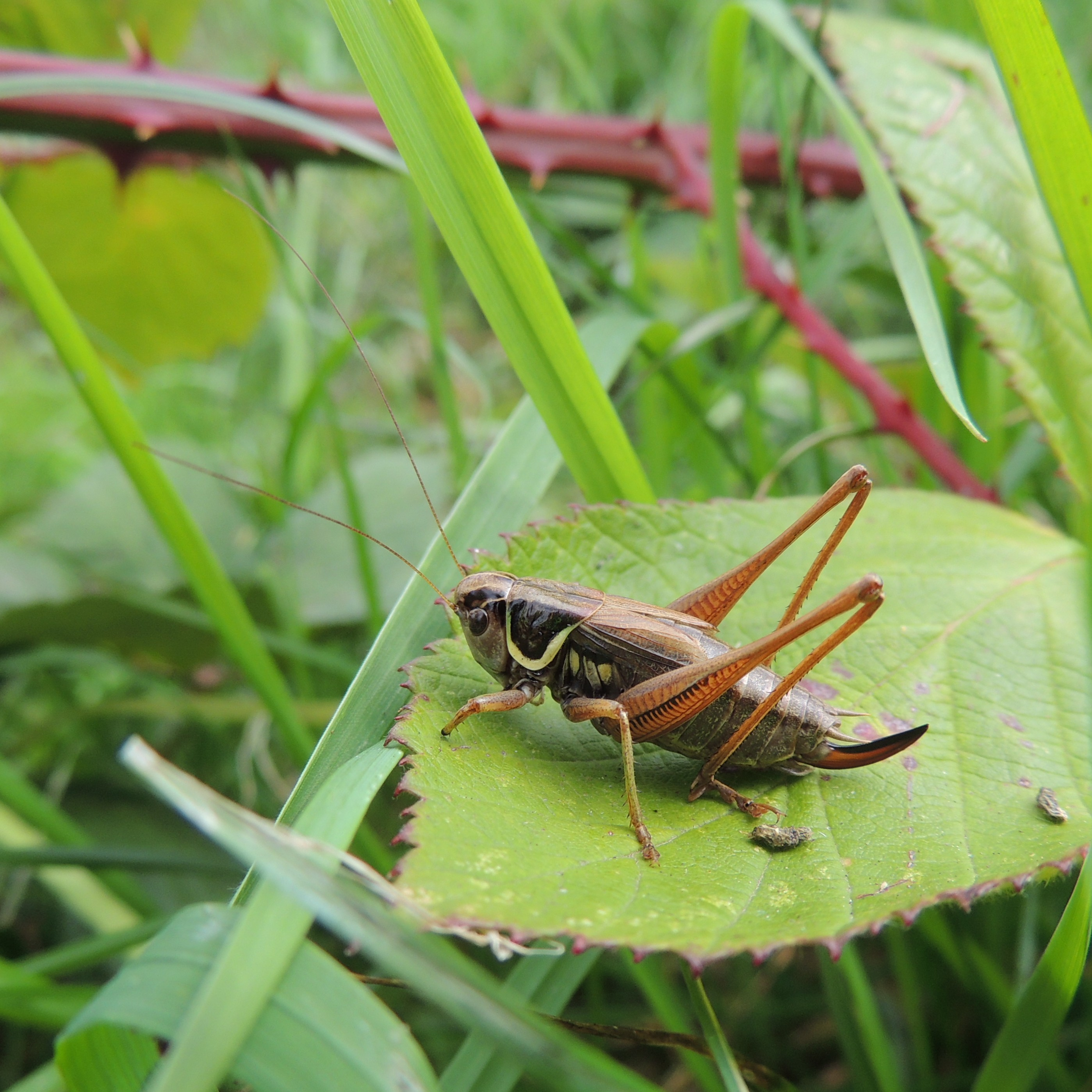
- Roeseliana (Metrioptera) roeselii

Scientific classification
- Domain: Eukaryota
- Kingdom: Animalia
- Phylum: Arthropoda
- Class: Insecta
- Order: Orthoptera
- Suborder: Ensifera
- Family: Tettigoniidae
- Subfamily: Tettigoniinae
- Tribe: Platycleidini
- Genus: Roeseliana; Zeuner, 1941

= Roeseliana =

Genus of cricket-like animals

Roeseliana is a genus of bush cricket or katydid in the subfamily Tettigoniinae. Species in this genus were placed at various times in the genera Metrioptera and Bicolorana, until Roeseliana was restored in 2011, with these and other similar genera placed in genus group Metrioptera.

== Species ==
These species belong to the genus Roeseliana:

1. Roeseliana ambitiosa (Uvarov, 1924)
2. Roeseliana azami (Finot, 1892)
3. Roeseliana bispina (Bolívar, 1899)
4. Roeseliana brunneri Ramme, 1951
5. Roeseliana epirotica Lemonnier-Darcemont & Darcemont, 2023 - Greece
6. Roeseliana fedtschenkoi (Saussure, 1874) (2 subspp.)
7. Roeseliana oporina (Bolívar, 1887)
8. Roeseliana pylnovi (Uvarov, 1924)
9. Roeseliana roeselii (Hagenbach, 1822) - type species
