= Longmoor Bog =

Protected area in Berkshire, England

- Site of Special Scientific Interest
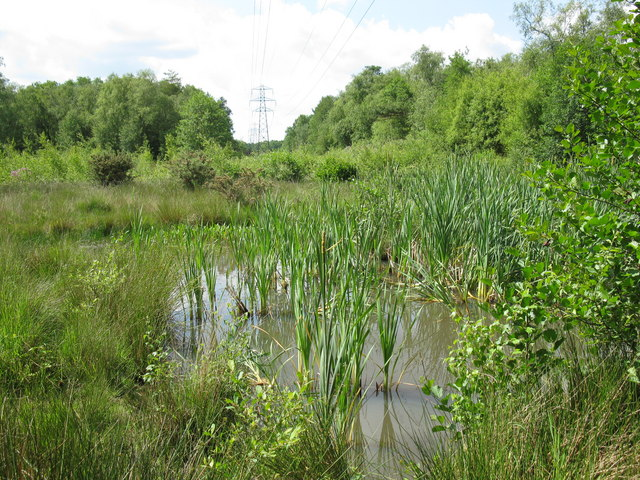

- Location within Berkshire
- Location of Longmoor Bog.
- Area of search: Berkshire
- Grid reference: SU 781 653
- Coordinates: 51.38°N 0.878°W
- Interest: Biological
- Area: 14.0 hectares (35 acres)
- Notification date: 1986
- Location map: Magic Map

Longmoor Bog is a 14-hectare (35-acre) biological Site of Special Scientific Interest north of Finchampstead in Berkshire. An area of 11.8 hectares (29 acres) is a Local Nature Reserve. It is part of California Country Park, which is owned and managed by Wokingham District Council.

This is mainly carr woodland, together with areas of wet heath and secondary mixed woodland. A small stream runs through the carr woodland, which has peat to a depth of more than a metre and the ground is covered by mosses. The wet heath is important for insects, such as the bog bush cricket, silver-studded blue butterfly, emperor dragonfly, waved black moth and wood ant.
