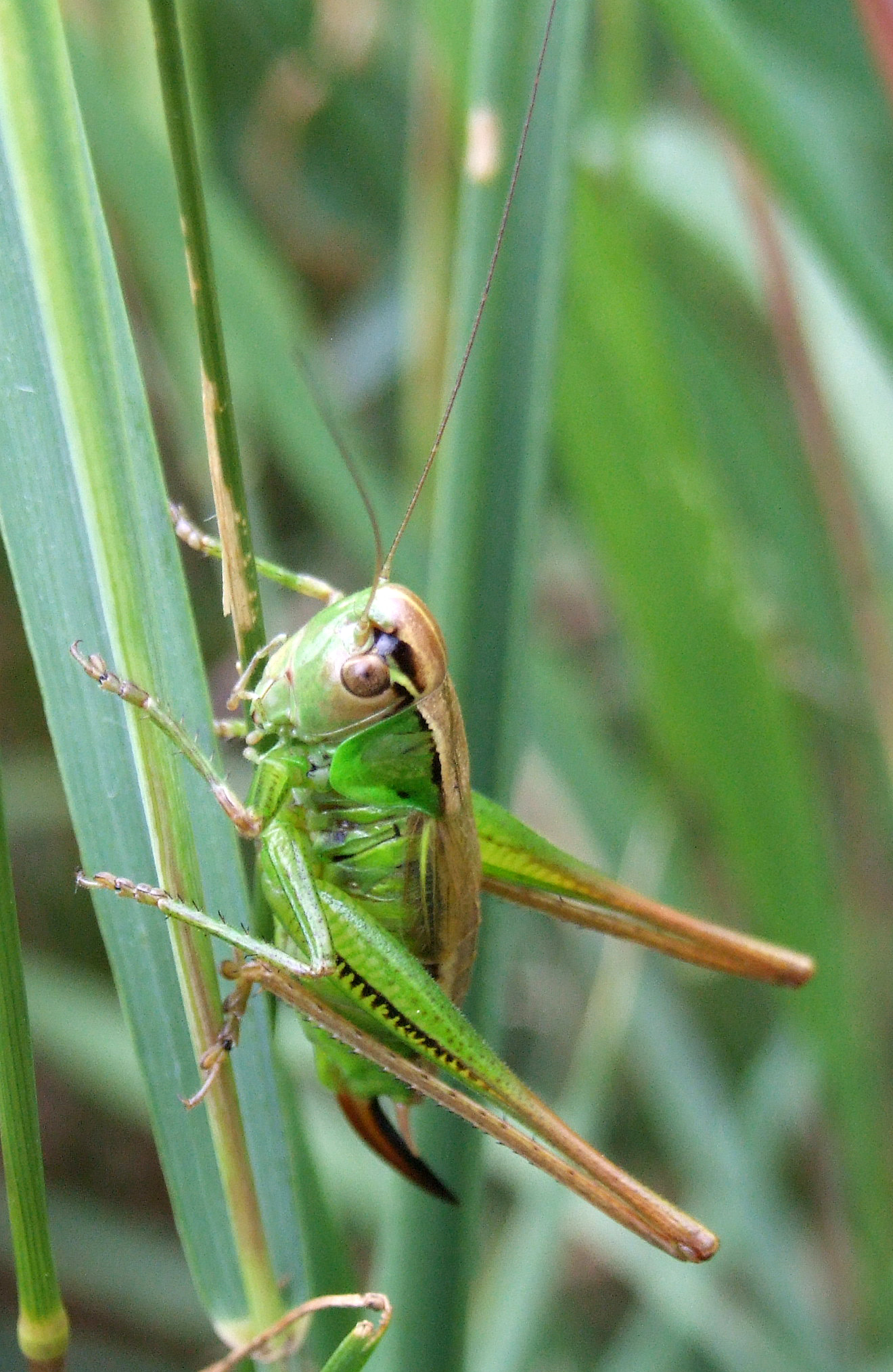
- Female

Scientific classification
- Domain: Eukaryota
- Kingdom: Animalia
- Phylum: Arthropoda
- Class: Insecta
- Order: Orthoptera
- Suborder: Ensifera
- Family: Tettigoniidae
- Genus: Bicolorana
- Species: B. bicolor

Binomial name
- Bicolorana bicolor (Philippi, 1830)

Synonyms
- Metrioptera (Bicolorana) bicolor (Philippi, 1830); For B. bicolor bicolor: Metrioptera (Vichetia) helleri Schmidt, 1998; Decticus sieboldii Fischer, 1849; Locusta viennensis Marschall, 1836

= Bicolorana bicolor =

Species of cricket-like animal

Close-Up of a Bicolorana bicolor

Bicolorana bicolor is a species of bush cricket in the subfamily Tettigoniinae and tribe Platycleidini: found in mainland Western Europe Individuals are normally brachypterous, but long-winged forms may be encountered.

The species was originally described by RA Philippi in 1830 as "Locusta bicolor".

== Subspecies ==
The Catalogue of Life lists:

- Bicolorana bicolor angarica
- Bicolorana bicolor bicolor

== Gallery ==
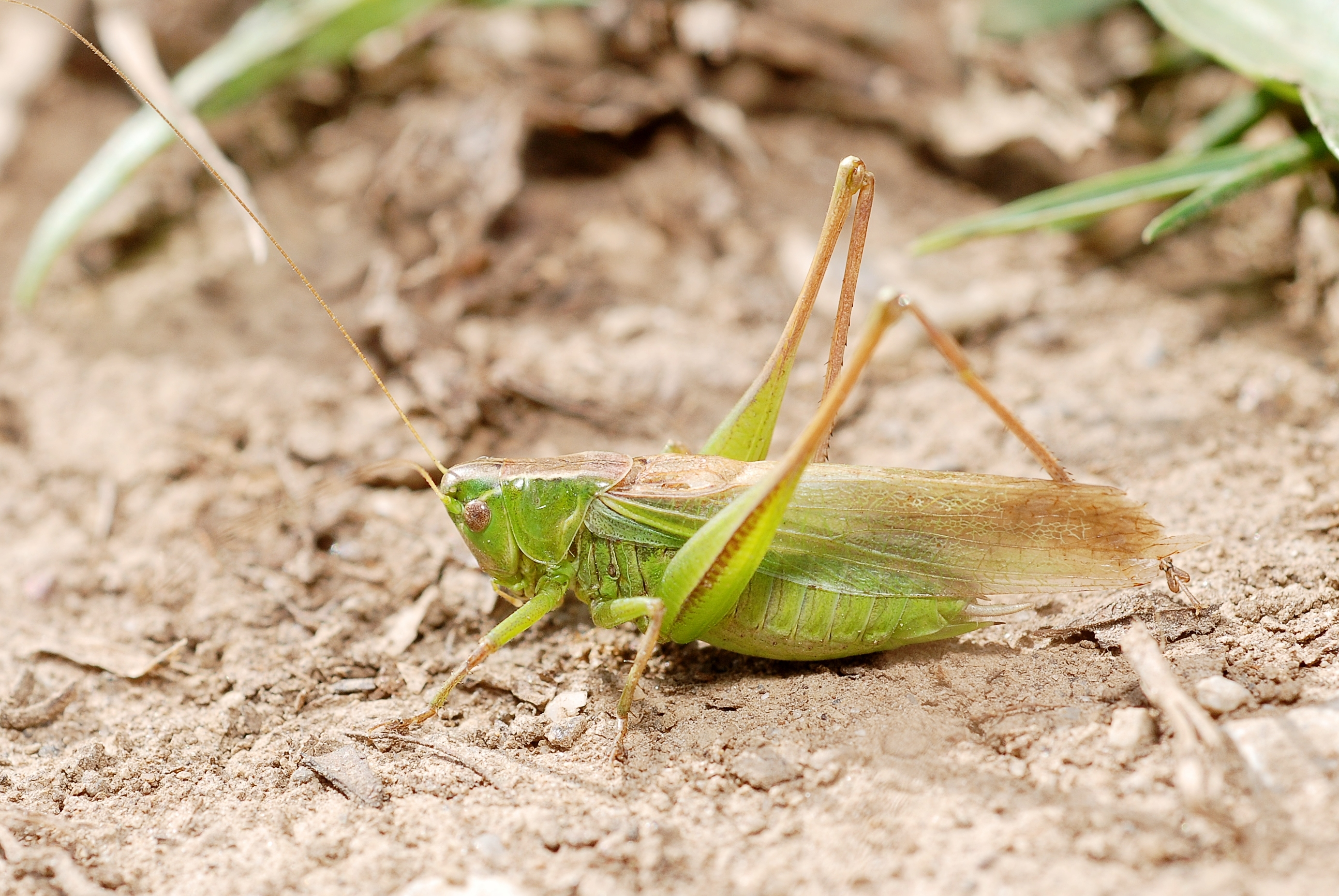
B. bicolor, macropterous male

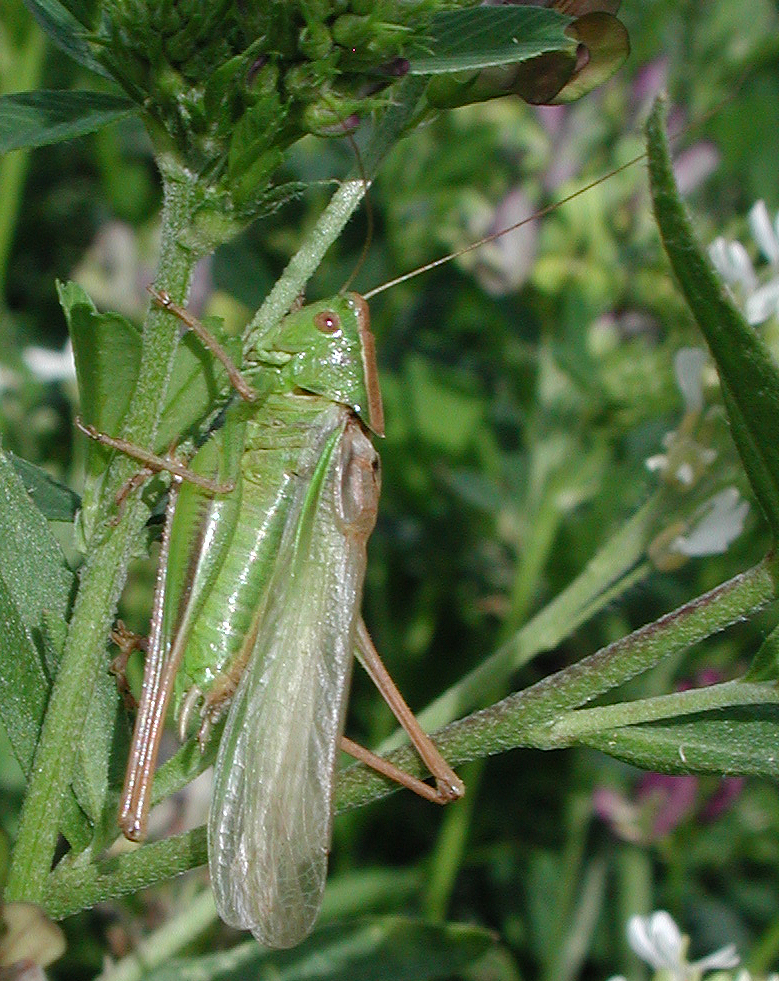

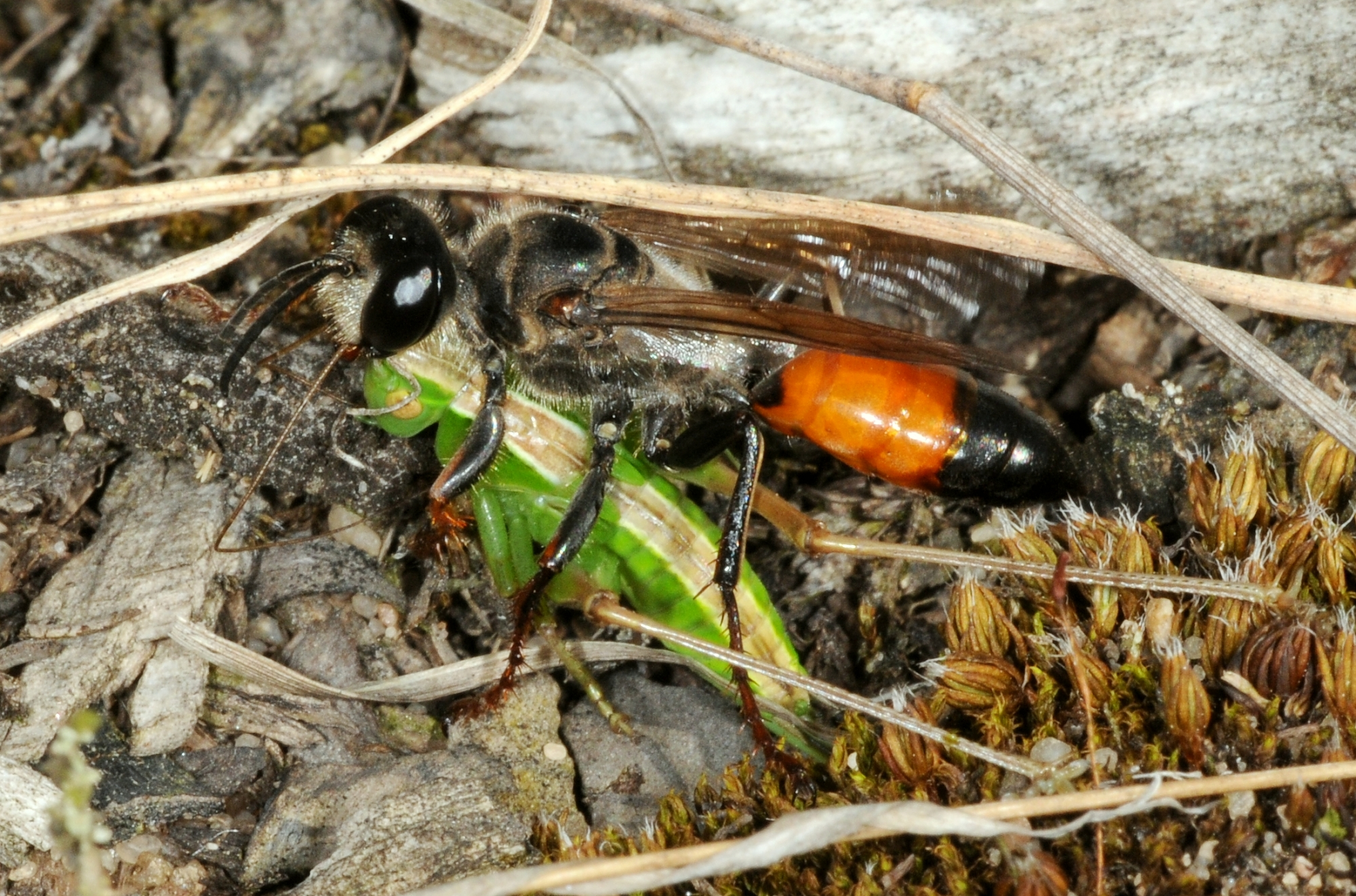
male being parasitised by Sphex funerarius

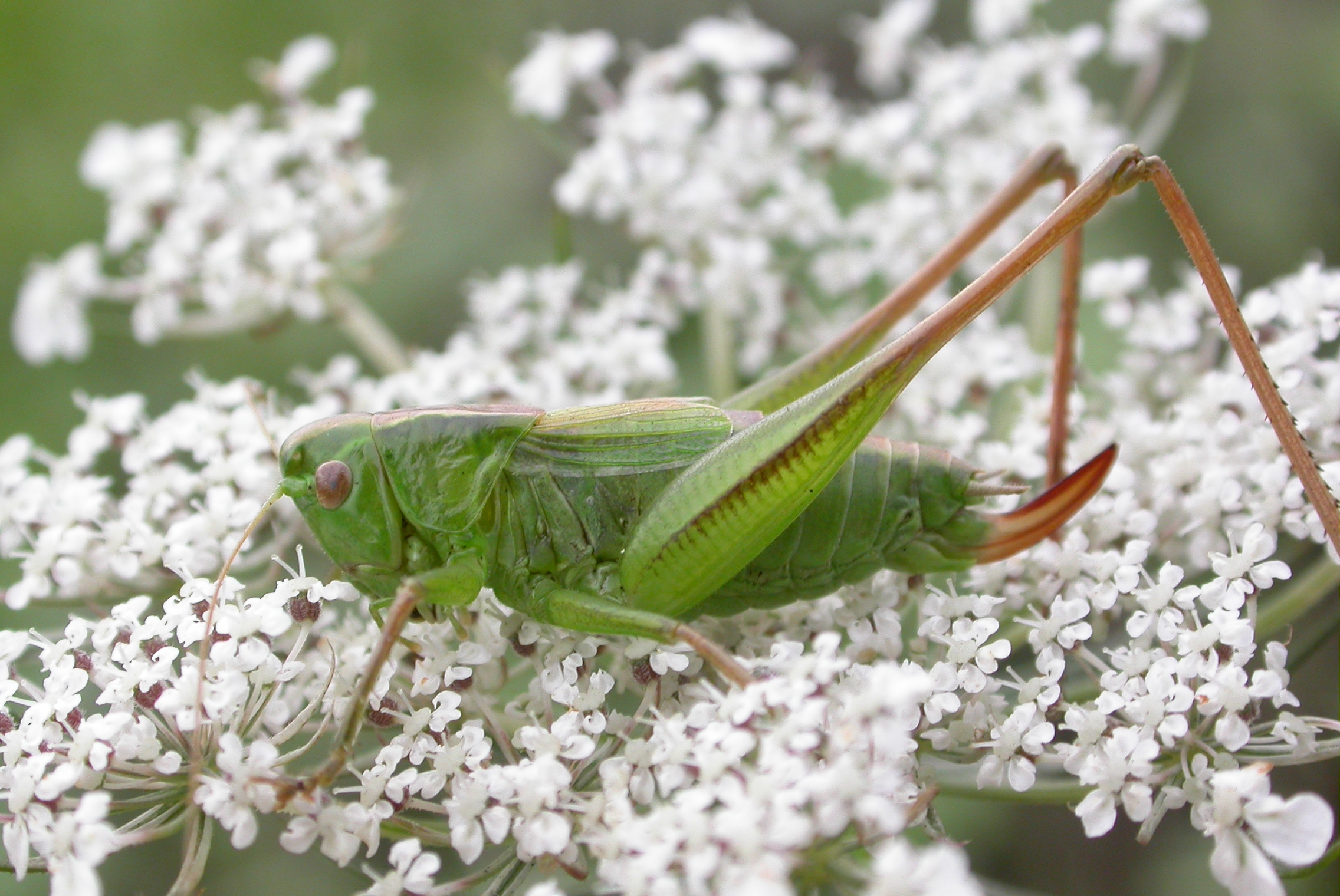
