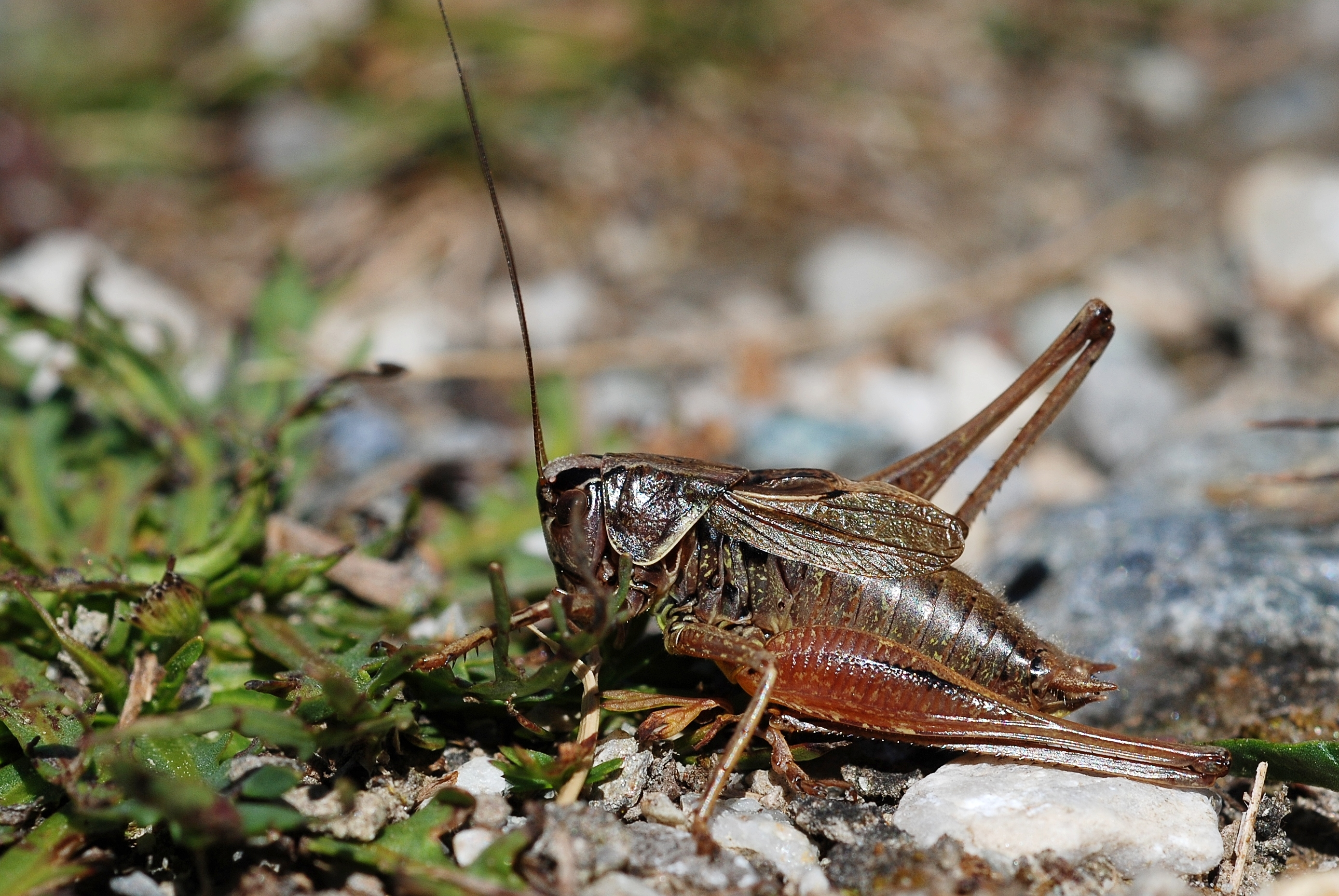

Scientific classification
- Kingdom: Animalia
- Phylum: Arthropoda
- Class: Insecta
- Order: Orthoptera
- Suborder: Ensifera
- Family: Tettigoniidae
- Genus: Metrioptera
- Species: M. saussuriana

Binomial name
- Metrioptera saussuriana (Frey-Gessner, 1872)

= Metrioptera saussuriana =

Species of cricket-like animal

Metrioptera saussuriana is a species belonging to the family Tettigoniidae subfamily Tettigoniinae. It is a high meadow species found on many mountains and low mountain ranges in southern Europe. Its range extends in the Iberian Peninsula from Portugal and Spain over the Pyrenees, southern France to the French and Swiss Jura and the southern and western Alps. Isolated populations are to be found in the Balearic Islands, in Corsica, Sardinia, some northwestern French islands and in central Europe near Salzburg. The species is missing in Germany.

Close-Up of a Metrioptera saussuriana
