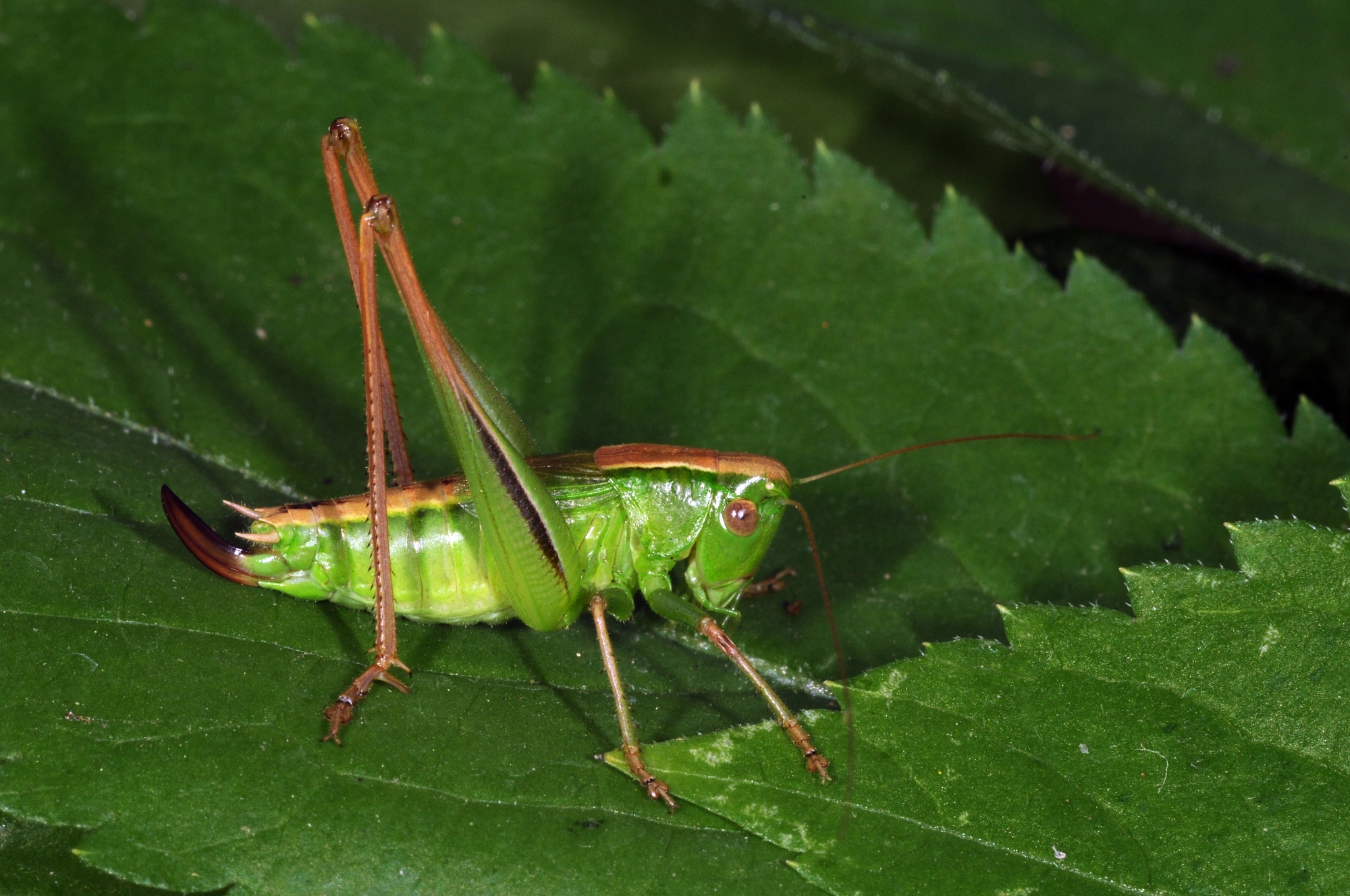
- Bicolorana bicolor

Scientific classification
- Domain: Eukaryota
- Kingdom: Animalia
- Phylum: Arthropoda
- Class: Insecta
- Order: Orthoptera
- Suborder: Ensifera
- Family: Tettigoniidae
- Subfamily: Tettigoniinae
- Tribe: Platycleidini
- Genus: Bicolorana; Zeuner, 1941

= Bicolorana =

Genus of cricket-like animals

Bicolorana is a genus of bush crickets in the subfamily Tettigoniinae and tribe Platycleidini. Species can be found in many parts of mainland Europe (but not the British Isles, Iberia or most of Scandinavia), through central Asia to the Korean peninsula.

== Species ==
The Orthoptera Species File lists the following:

1. Bicolorana bicolor Philippi, 1830 - type species (as Locusta bicolor Philippi = Bicolorana bicolor bicolor)
2. Bicolorana burri Uvarov, 1921
3. Bicolorana kraussi (Padewieth, 1900), the Croatian Meadow Bush-cricket (synonym B. kuntzeni Ramme, 1931)

=== Moved species ===
Some sources may list species names that are now placed in the genus Roeseliana:

- "Bicolorana ambitiosa"
- B. bispina
- B. fedtschenkoi
- B. pylnovi
- B. roeselii (Roesel's bush cricket)

Both these and other genera are very similar, they are now placed in genus group Metrioptera.

== Gallery ==
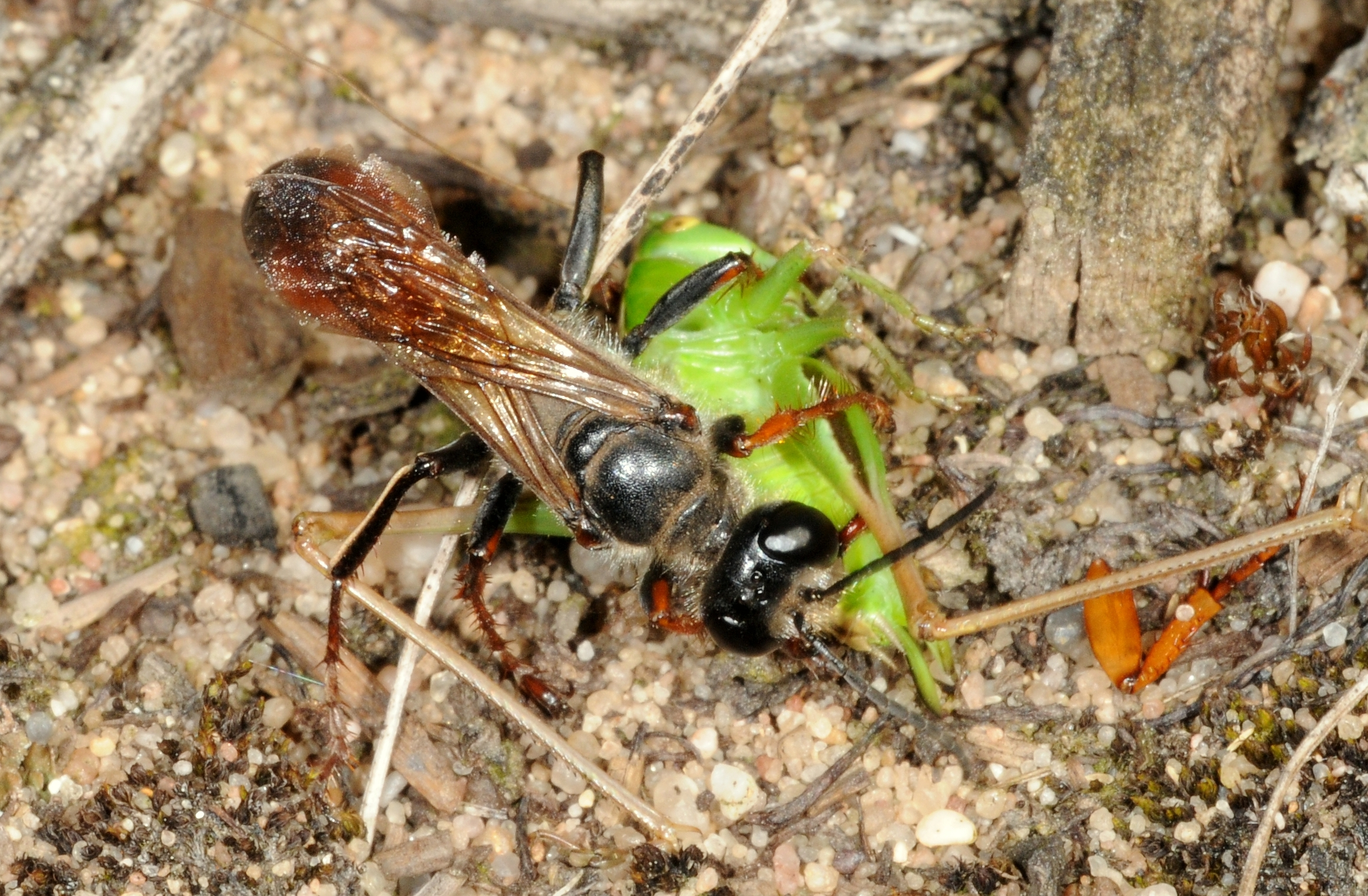

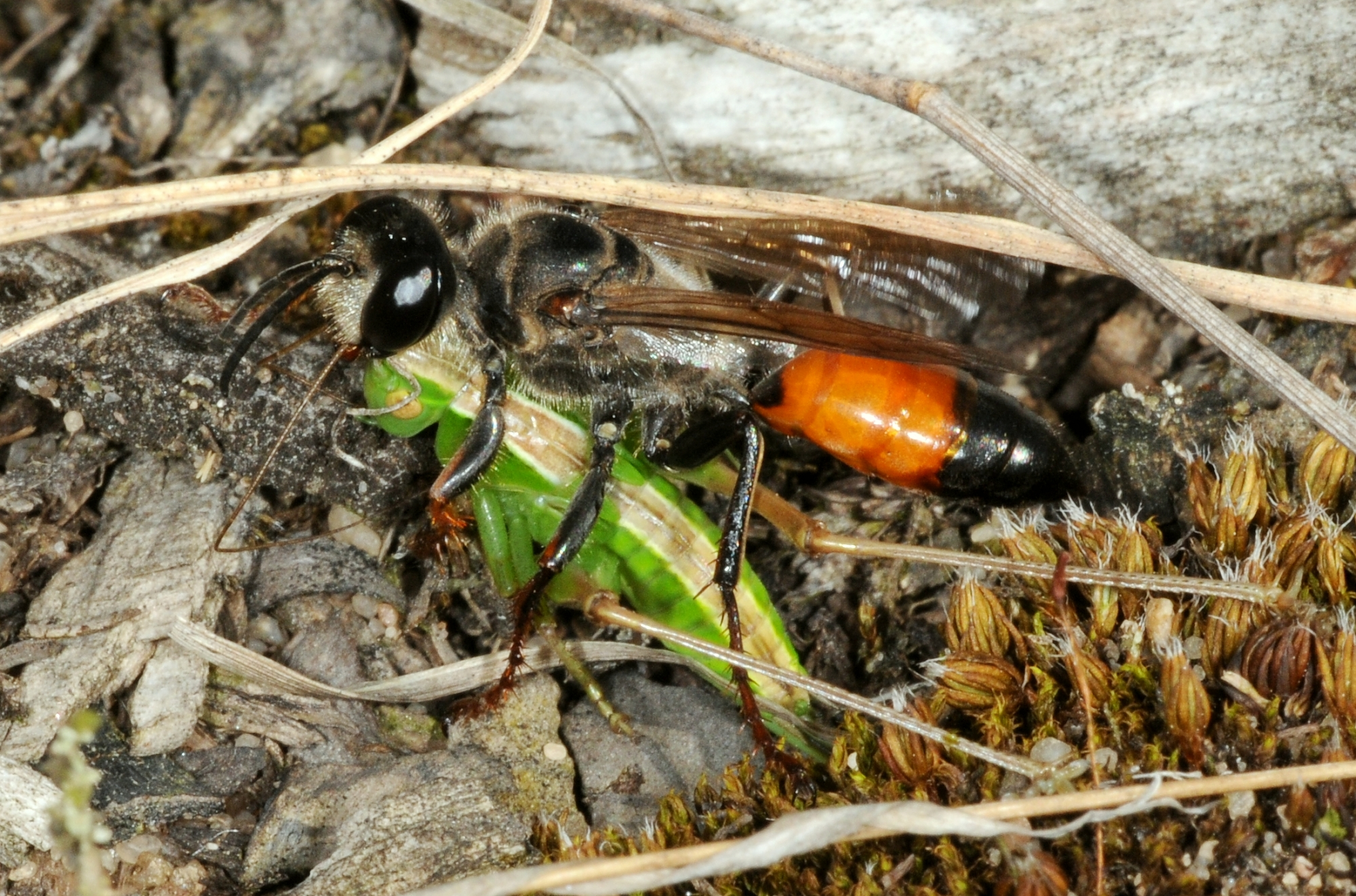

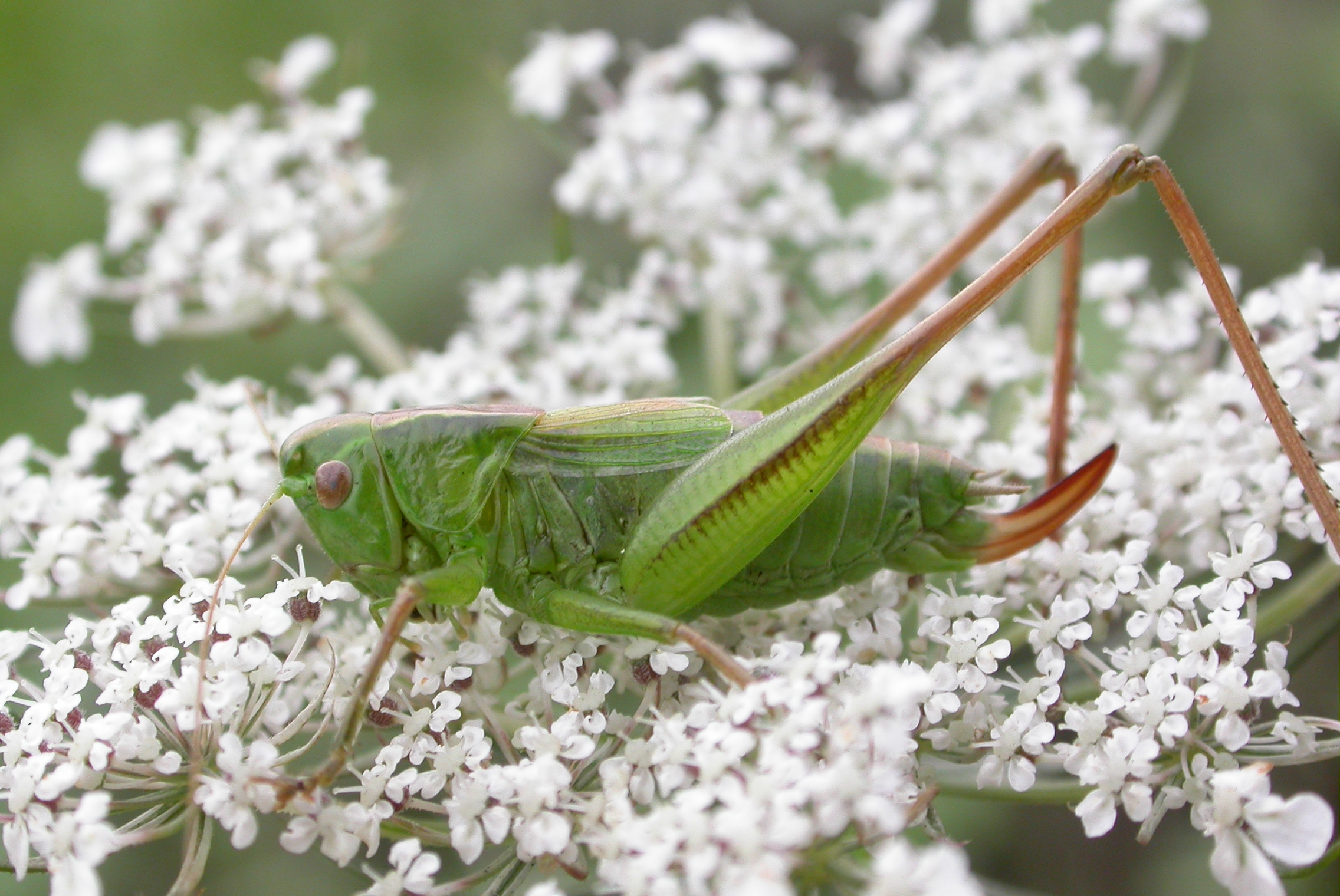

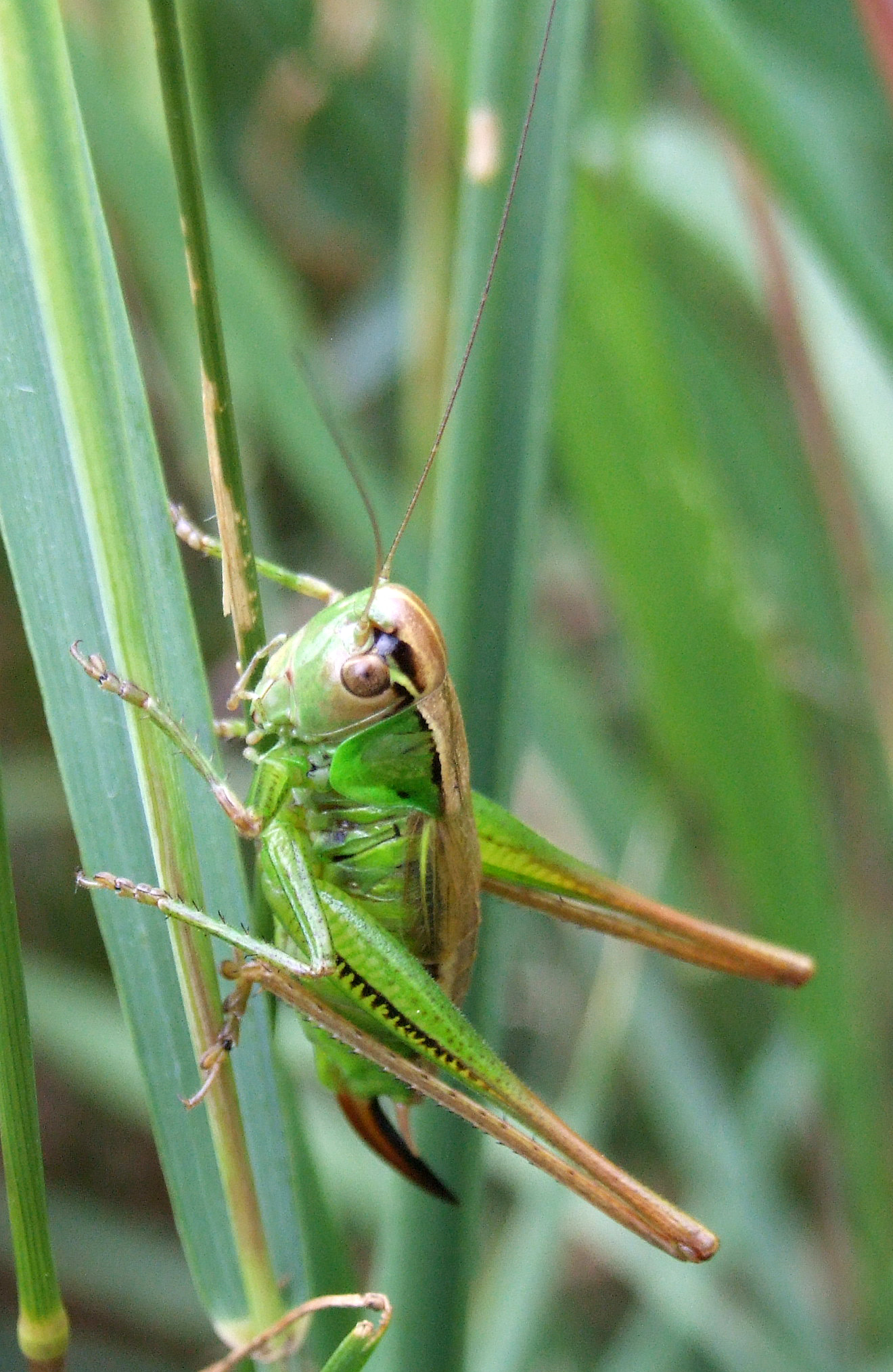

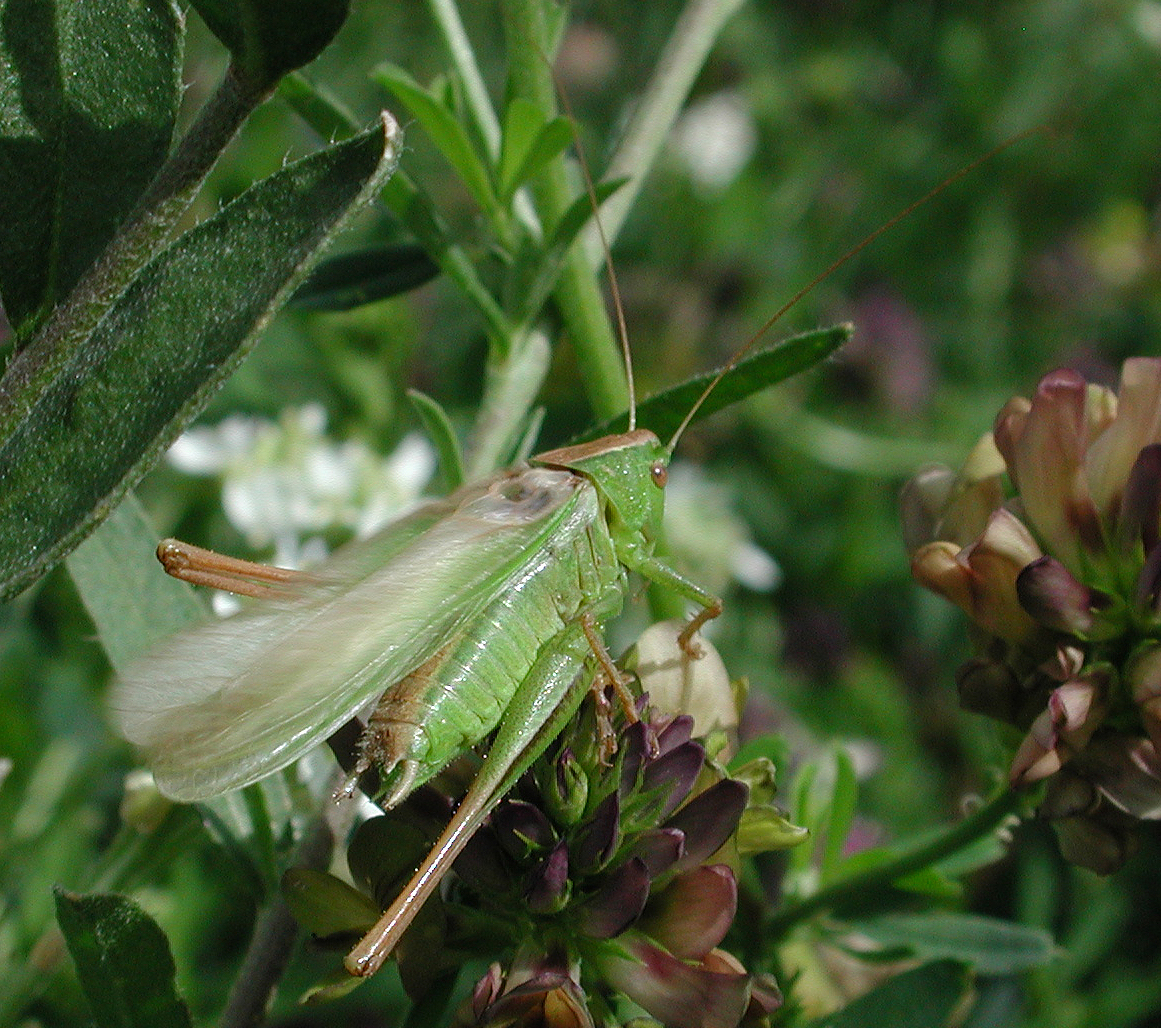

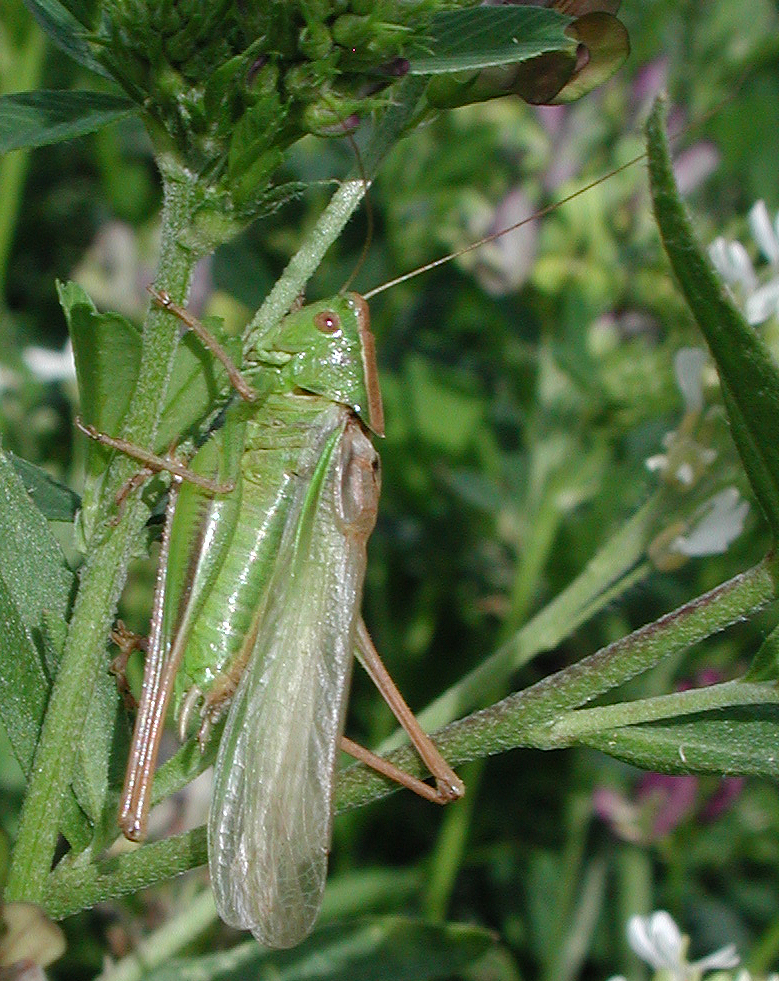
