= Goole Hall =

House in Goole Fields, East Riding of Yorkshire, England

Coordinates: 53°41′05″N 0°51′39″W

Goole Hall is a historic building in Goole Fields, a hamlet in the East Riding of Yorkshire, in England.

The house was constructed around 1820, for Jarvis Empson. A couple of ground floor rooms had elaborate ceiling paintings of mythological figures, by E. Empson. These were later damaged by damp, and removed to the North Lincolnshire Museum. The house was altered and extended in 1985 and 1986, when it was converted into a residential care home. It has been grade II* listed since 1967.

The house is built of red brick, with sandstone dressings, chamfered rustication on the basement, a floor band, sill bands, a moulded cornice, a blocking course and a flat Westmorland slate roof, hipped on the sides. There are two storeys and a basement, and a rectangular plan, with a front of five bays, the middle bay projecting. Seven steps lead to an Ionic porch with fluted columns and pilasters, an entablature, a modillion cornice, a flat roof and a balcony with a cast iron balustrade. The doorway has a rusticated surround, a fanlight and a ribbed frieze. The windows are sashes, those on the ground floor in reveals, with flat lintels, corniced hoods on scrolled consoles, and recessed panelled decorated aprons. The window above the balcony has an architrave and a hood on consoles. Inside, the original main and back staircases survive, as do much plasterwork, and many fireplaces and doors.

== See also ==
- Grade II* listed buildings in the East Riding of Yorkshire
- Listed buildings in Goole Fields
