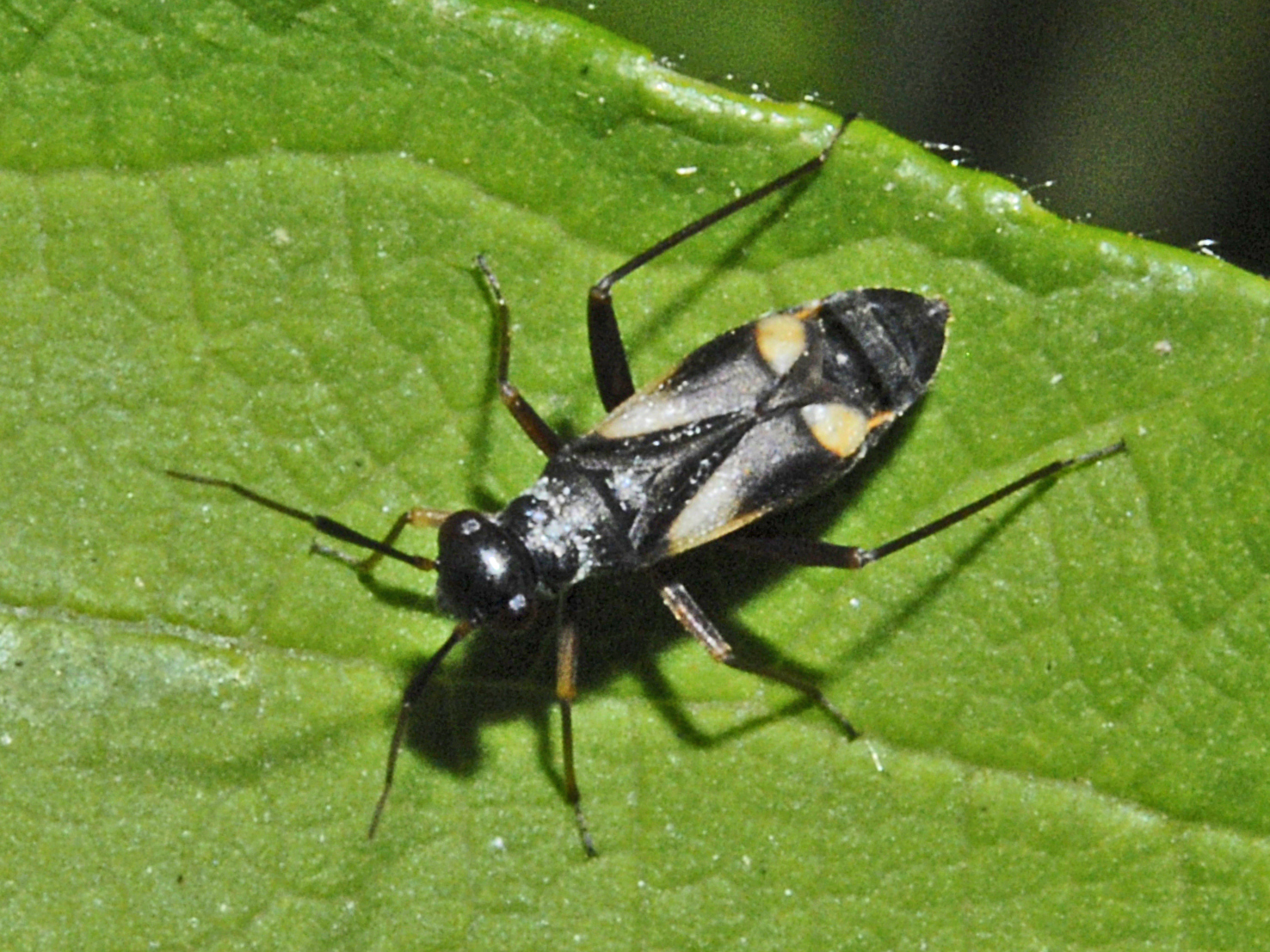
- Globiceps fulvicollis

Scientific classification
- Kingdom: Animalia
- Phylum: Arthropoda
- Class: Insecta
- Order: Hemiptera
- Suborder: Heteroptera
- Family: Miridae
- Genus: Globiceps; Le Peletier & Serville, 1825

= Globiceps =

Genus of true bugs

Globiceps is a genus of plant-feeding insects of the family Miridae.

== Selected species ==
Species within this genus include:

- Globiceps flavomaculatus:
- Globiceps fulvicollis:
- Globiceps salicicola:
- Globiceps sphaegiformis (Rossi, 1790):
