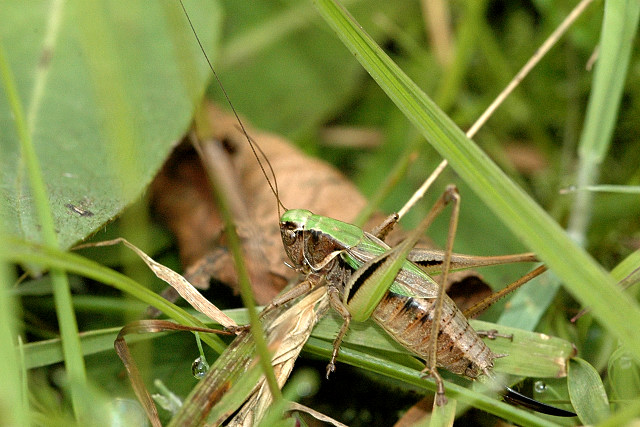

Conservation status
- Least Concern (IUCN 3.1) (Europe regional assessment)

Scientific classification
- Kingdom: Animalia
- Phylum: Arthropoda
- Class: Insecta
- Order: Orthoptera
- Suborder: Ensifera
- Family: Tettigoniidae
- Subfamily: Tettigoniinae
- Tribe: Platycleidini
- Genus: Metrioptera
- Species: M. brachyptera

Binomial name
- Metrioptera brachyptera Linné, 1761

= Metrioptera brachyptera =

Species of cricket-like animal

Metrioptera brachyptera is a species in the family Tettigoniidae commonly called the bog bush cricket.

M. brachyptera has a body length of 12–16 mm, with color ranging from brownish, with green elements on the upper side of the head and forearm, as well as on the sides of the body. In the female, the hind legs are often partly weakly greenish. As the name suggests, The wings are usually brachypterous, although long-winged morphs may be found.

Its range extends to most of Europe, except the Iberian peninsula. It is typically found in bogs, marshes, and other wetlands. The males can be fairly aggressive and attract mates with a song consisting of a simple repeated "zirr".

Close-Up of a Metrioptera brachyptera

== Gallery ==
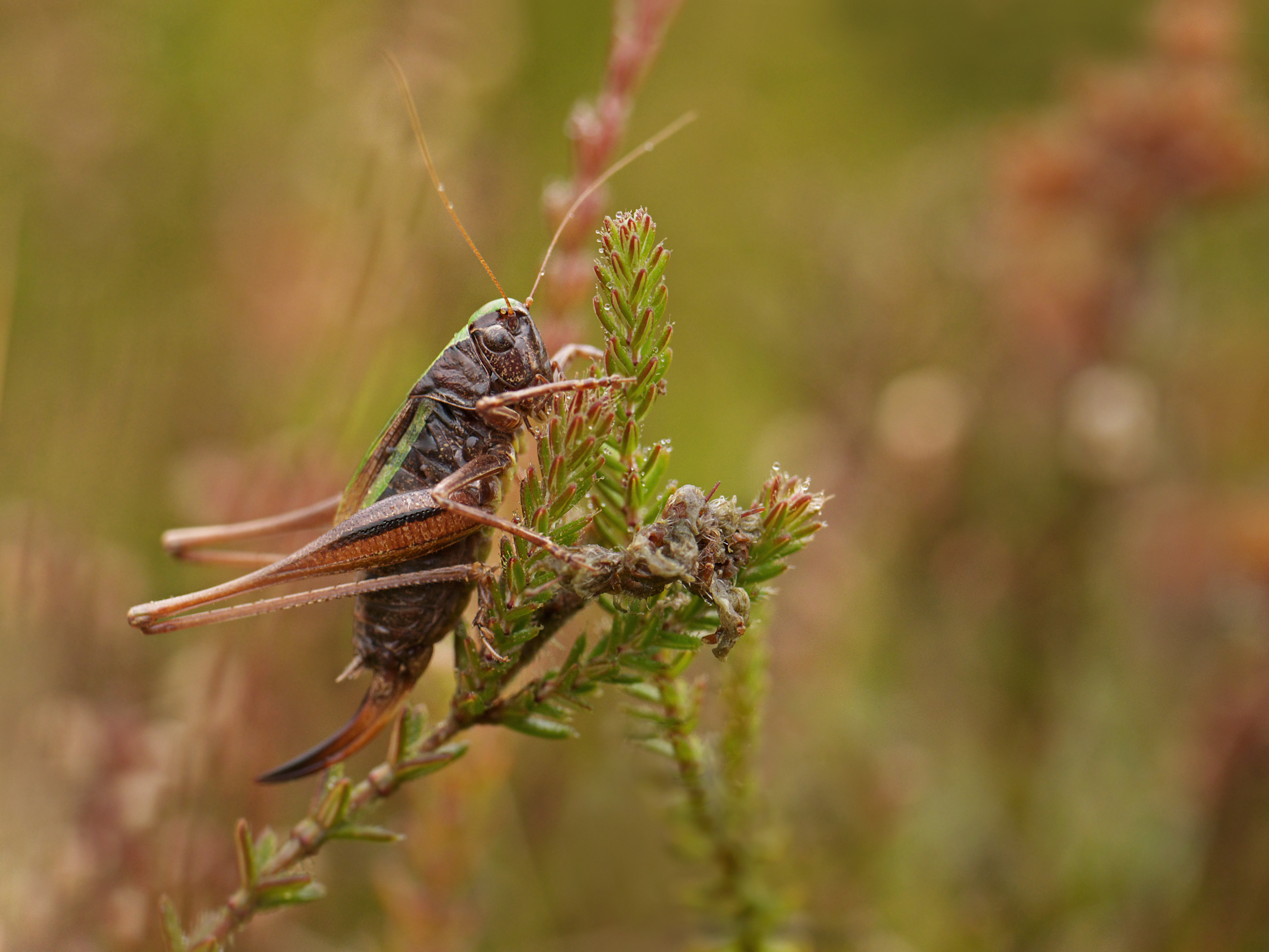
female

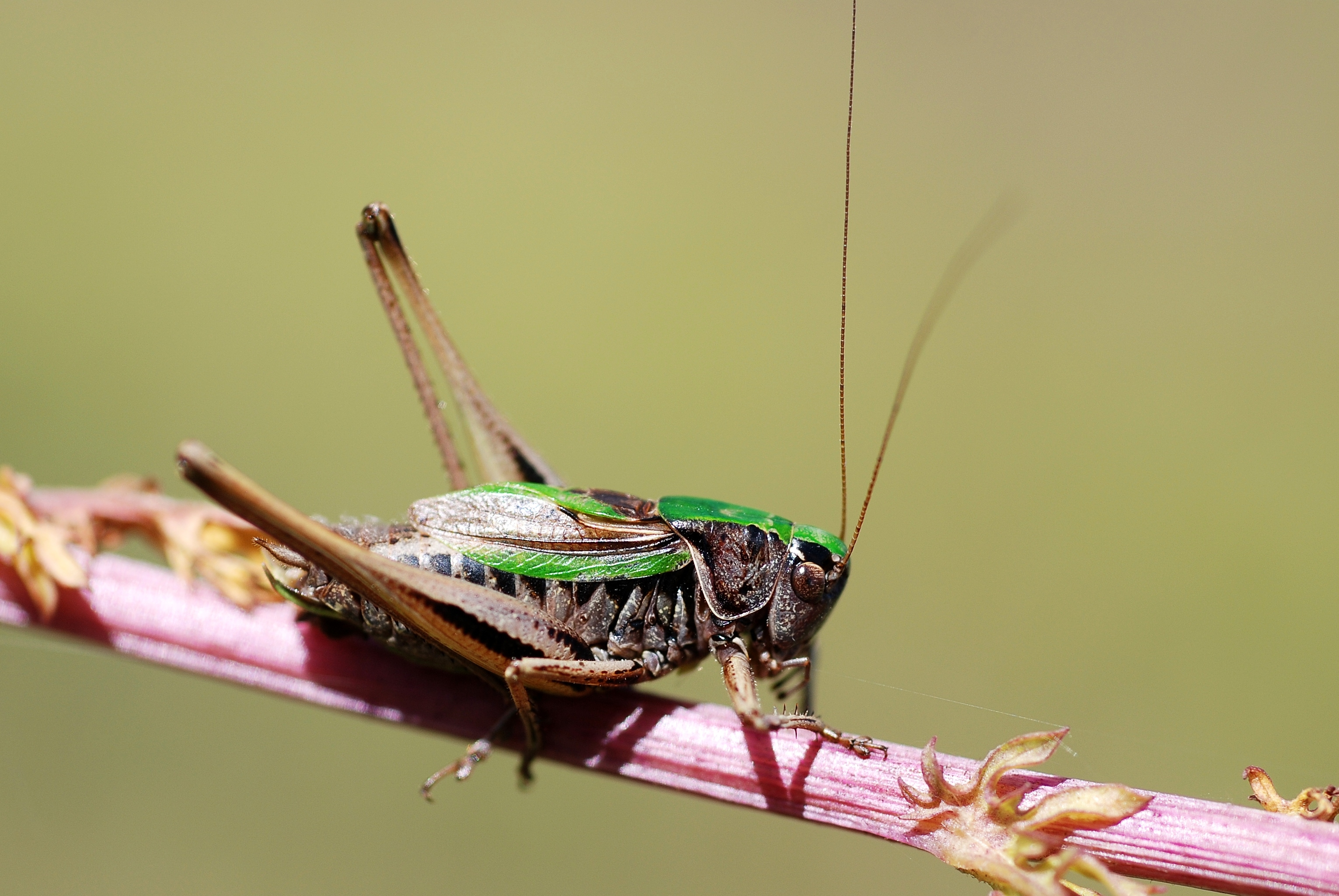
male

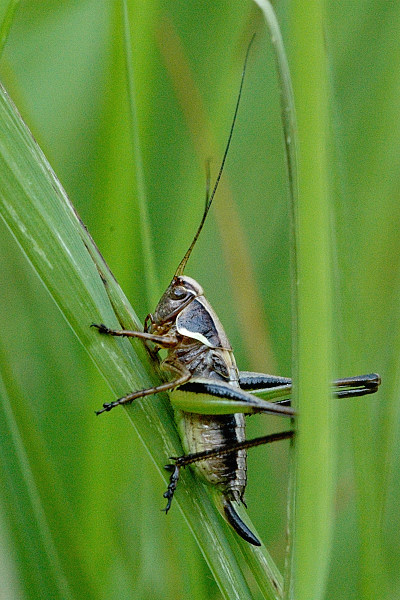
nymph
