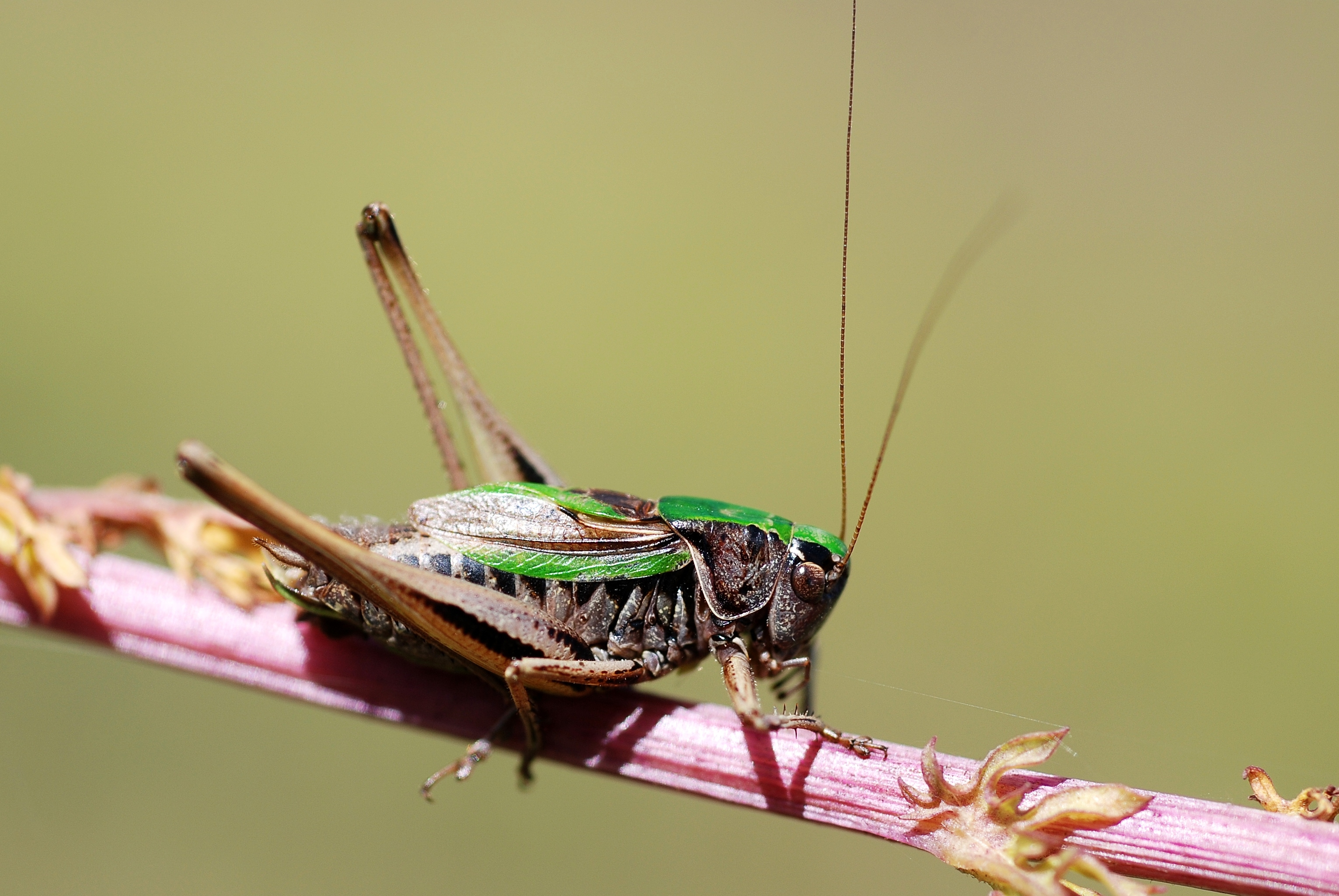
- Metrioptera brachyptera male

Scientific classification
- Domain: Eukaryota
- Kingdom: Animalia
- Phylum: Arthropoda
- Class: Insecta
- Order: Orthoptera
- Suborder: Ensifera
- Superfamily: Tettigonioidea
- Family: Tettigoniidae
- Subfamily: Tettigoniinae
- Tribe: Platycleidini
- Genus: Metrioptera; Wesmaël, 1838

= Metrioptera =

Genus of cricket-like animals

Metrioptera is a genus of insects in the tribe Platycleidini and subfamily Tettigoniinae, include the bog and meadow bush crickets. They are found in Eurasia.

== Taxonomy ==
=== Genus group Metrioptera ===
A number of Palaearctic and North American genera are very similar, and were grouped here in F.E. Zeuner's revision. They are:

1. Bicolorana Zeuner, 1941
2. Metrioptera Wesmaël, 1838
3. Roeseliana Zeuner, 1941
4. Sphagniana Zeuner, 1941 - Canada and NE Asia
5. Zeuneriana Ramme, 1951

=== Species ===
The Orthoptera Species File includes:

1. Metrioptera ambigua Pfau, 1986
2. Metrioptera brachyptera (Linnaeus, 1761) - type species (as Gryllus brachypterus L.)
3. Metrioptera buyssoni (Saulcy, 1887)
4. Metrioptera caprai Baccetti, 1956
5. Metrioptera hoermanni (Werner, 1906)
6. Metrioptera karnyana Uvarov, 1924
7. Metrioptera maritima Olmo-Vidal, 1992
8. Metrioptera prenjica (Burr, 1899)
9. Metrioptera saussuriana (Frey-Gessner, 1872)
10. Metrioptera tsirojanni Harz & Pfau, 1983

== See also ==
- List of Orthopteroid genera containing species recorded in Europe
