= Yersin =

Yersin may refer to:

== People ==
- Alexander Yersin (entomologist) (1825–1863), Swiss entomologist
- Alexandre Yersin (1863–1943), Swiss and French physician and bacteriologist
- Yves Yersin (1942–2018), Swiss film director

== Other ==
- Lycée français Alexandre Yersin (LFAY), French international school in Long Bien District, Hanoi, Vietnam
- Lycée Yersin, a school in Da Lat, Vietnam, to educate the children of French colonialists and upper class Vietnamese. After various changes, it is now the Pedagogical College of Da Lat
- Yersin Museum, a museum in Nha Trang, Vietnam, dedicated to Alexandre Yersin the bacteriologist
