= Alexander Yersin =

Alexander Yersin may refer to:

- Alexandre Yersin (1863–1943), Swiss and French physician and bacteriologist
- Alexander Yersin (entomologist) (1825–1863), Swiss entomologist
