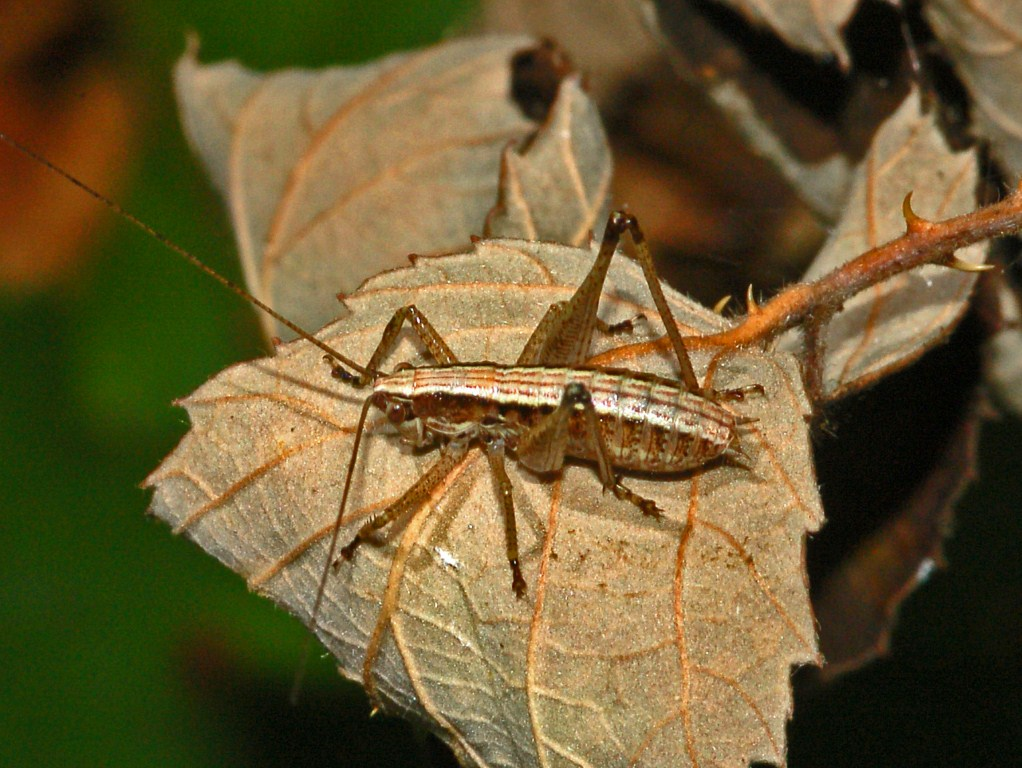
- Yersinella raymondii, male

Conservation status
- Least Concern (IUCN 3.1)

Scientific classification
- Kingdom: Animalia
- Phylum: Arthropoda
- Clade: Pancrustacea
- Class: Insecta
- Order: Orthoptera
- Suborder: Ensifera
- Family: Tettigoniidae
- Genus: Yersinella
- Species: Y. raymondii

Binomial name
- Yersinella raymondii (Yersin, 1860)
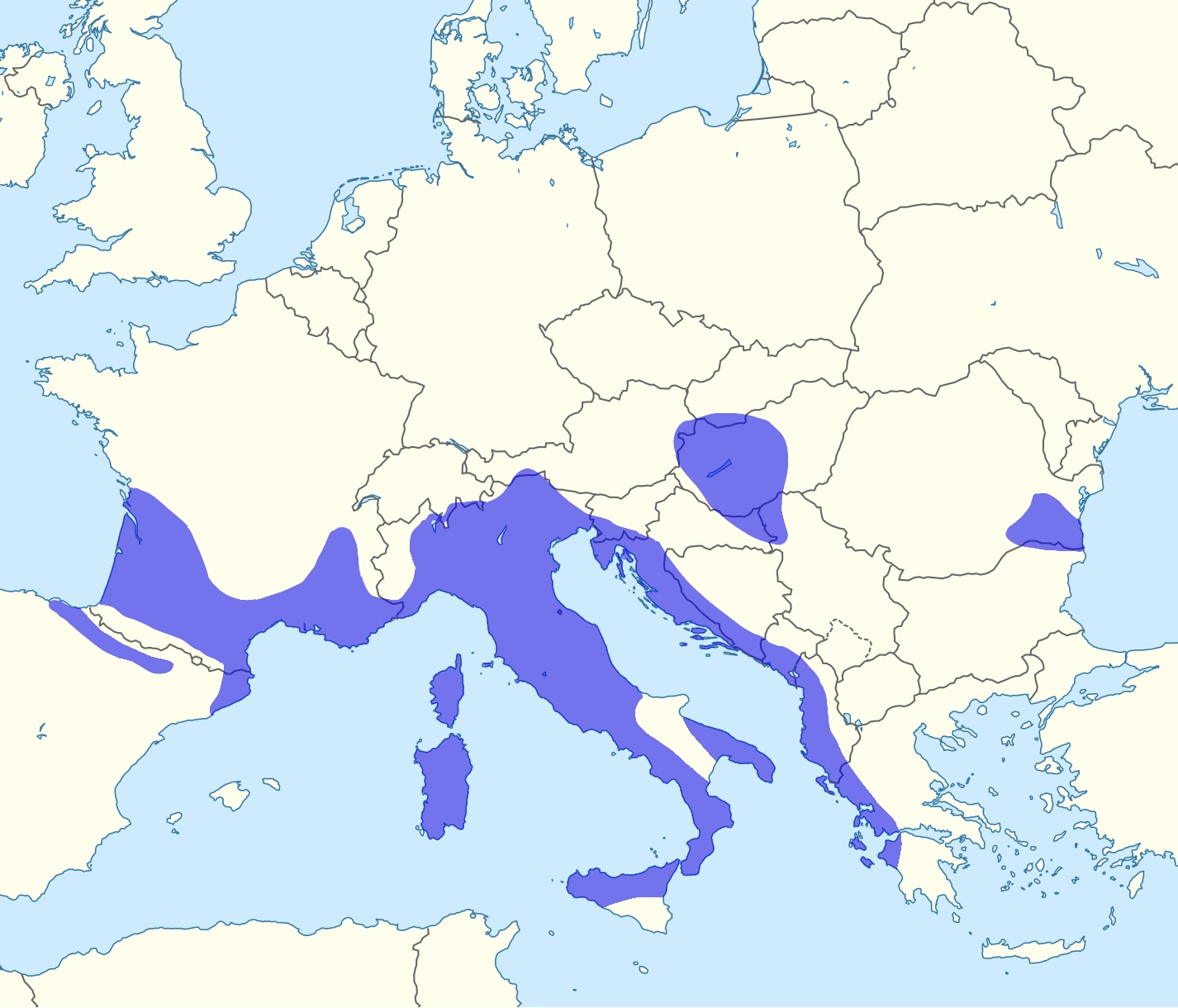

Synonyms
- Anterastes raymondi (Yersin, 1860); Pterolepis raymondi Yersin, 1860; Rhacocleis dorsata (Brunner von Wattenwyl, 1861); Tettigonia gaverniensis Serville, 1838; Thamnotrizon dorsatus Brunner von Wattenwyl, 1861; Thamnotrizon dorsatus Brunner von Wattenwyl, 1861; Yersinella raymondi (Yersin, 1860)

= Yersinella raymondii =

Species of cricket-like animal

Yersinella raymondii, also known as Raymond's bush-cricket, is a species of "katydids crickets" belonging to the family Tettigoniidae subfamily Tettigoniinae. The scientific name Yersinella comes from the name of the entomologist who has described the species in 1860.

== Distribution ==
This quite common cricket is mainly present in Albania, Austria, Bosnia and Herzegovina, Croatia, France, Hungary, Romania, Italy, Greece, Serbia, Slovakia, Slovenia, Spain and Switzerland.

== Habitat ==
These "katydids crickets" mainly inhabit forest edges, open forests and Mediterranean shrubland, at an elevation up to 1,600 metres (5,250 ft) above sea level. They prefer shrubs and low herbaceous plants or soil, rather than tall grasses. As a matter of fact they live in hilly and mountainous areas, in the margins of forests and woodlands, as well in open areas with plenty of vegetation.

== Description ==
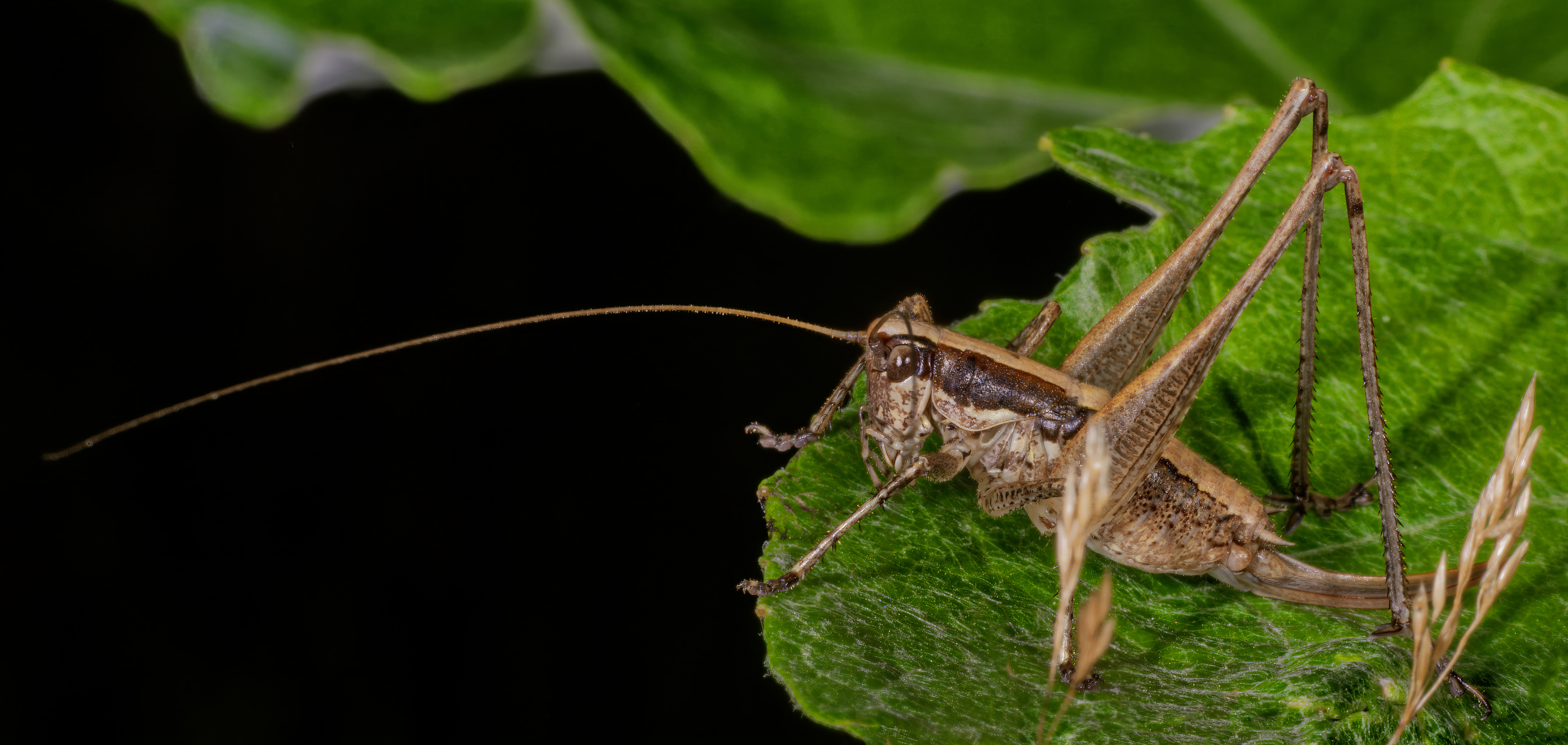
Female

Yersinella raymondii is rather small species, the adults grow up to about 12–16 millimetres (0.47–0.63 in) long, while females reach a maximum of 25–26 millimetres (0.98–1.02 in), including the relatively conspicuous, slightly and evenly bent upwards ovipositor (about 8–11 millimetres (0.31–0.43 in)).

The basic coloration of the body usually varies from gray to chestnut to reddish brown. The females are often brighter and less contrasted than the males. On the sides of the body runs a broad, longitudinal, dark gray or dark brown band, while the top of the body is light gray-colored or light brown, with two longitudinal brown lines. The compound eyes are dark brown. Antennae are longer than the body. The pronotum is flattened and extended to the rear and at the lower edge of its lateral margins there are whitish or yellowish bands. In the females the wings are reduced, protruding only just below the pronotum, where as in the male they are larger, but protrude beyond the neck shield at most by half its length. The abdomen is long and thick. The legs are brown, have darker areas on their knees and short thin spines on the lower parts of all pairs. The cerci of the males are slightly flattened and have no inner tooth.

Because of their small size and the barely visible wings often Yersinella raymondii is wrongly confused with a nymph of other grasshoppers, as well with Rhacocleis germanica, but it can be easily distinguished by the mentioned flat ends of the cerci typical of males and by the clear stripe on its back, contrasting with the sides of the body.

== Biology ==
Adults can be encountered from July through November. These crickets mainly feed on small invertebrates and on vegetable foods. Their nymphs are easily found in the litter. This species is a good index of the state of the forests, being quite sensitive to the environmental modifications.
