= Patrick Deville =

French writer (born 1957)

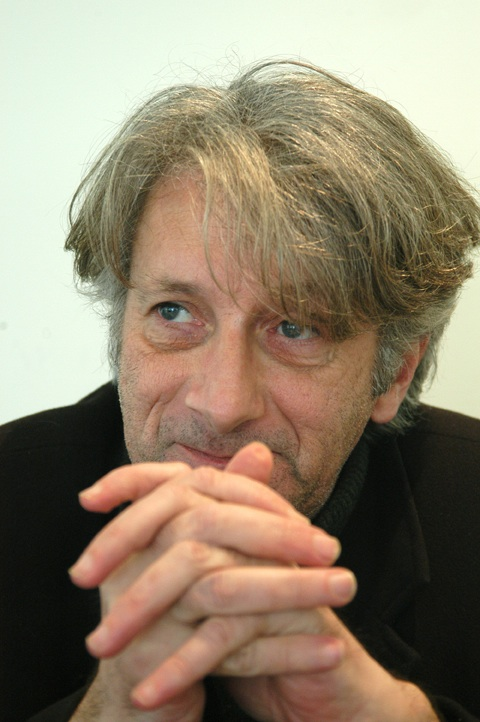
- Born: 14 December 1957 (age 68); Saint-Brevin-les-Pins, Loire-Atlantique
- Education: University of Nantes
- Occupation: writer
- Writing career
- Language: French

Patrick Deville (French pronunciation: [patʁik dəvil]; born 14 December 1957 in Saint-Brevin-les-Pins) is a French writer.

== Life ==
After studying comparative literature and philosophy at the University of Nantes, Deville lived in the Middle East, Nigeria and Algeria. In the 1990s, he travelled frequently to Cuba and Uruguay.

In 1996, he created the literary review Meet.

In 2011, the editors of Lire magazine selected Kampuchea as the best French novel of the year.

In 2012, his novel Plague and Cholera (based on the life of the bacteriologist Alexandre Yersin) was one of the most discussed books of the literary season. It was a finalist for several French prizes, and received both the Fnac Prize and the Prix Femina.

His books have been translated into a dozen languages.

== Works ==
- Œnologie et crus des vins, with Roger Piallat, Éditions Jérôme Villette 1996 (rééd. Kilien Stengel, 2008).
- Cordon-bleu, Editions de Minuit 1987 ISBN 9782707311207
  - Das Perspektiv. Rowohlt Verlag GmbH, 1989, ISBN 9783498012816
  - El Catalejo, Translator Javier Albiñana, Anagrama, 1990, ISBN 9788433931863
- Le Feu d'artifice, Editions de Minuit 1992 (The Fireworks) ISBN 9782707314208
  - Los Fuegos artificiales, Edicions 62, 1994, ISBN 9788429737332
  - 花火, 白水社, 1994, ISBN 9784560043264
- La Femme parfaite,, Editions de Minuit 1995 (The Perfect Woman) ISBN 9782707315076
- Ces deux-là, Editions de Minuit, 2000 (These Two)
- Pura vida: vie & mort de William Walker, Seuil, 2004 (Pure Life: Life and death of William Walker) ISBN 9782020628778
  - Pura vida: Vida y muerte de William Walker, Seix Barral, 2005, ISBN 9788432227875
- La Tentation des armes à feu, Seuil, 2006 (The Temptation of Firearms) ISBN 9782020798303
- Equatoria, Seuil, 2009, ISBN 9782020906807
- Kampuchéa, Seuil, 2011, ISBN 9782021056723
- Vie et mort sainte Tina l'exilée, editions publie.net, 2011 (Life and Holy Death in Exile Tina)
- Peste et Choléra, Seuil, 2012. [Plague and Cholera] ISBN 978-2-02-107720-9
- Viva, Seuil, 2014. ISBN 9782757854679
- Taba-Taba, Seuil, 2017.
- Amazonia, Seuil, 2019.
