= Dân Sinh Market =

Retail market in Ho Chi Minh, Vietnam

Coordinates: 10.7667°N 106.6982°E

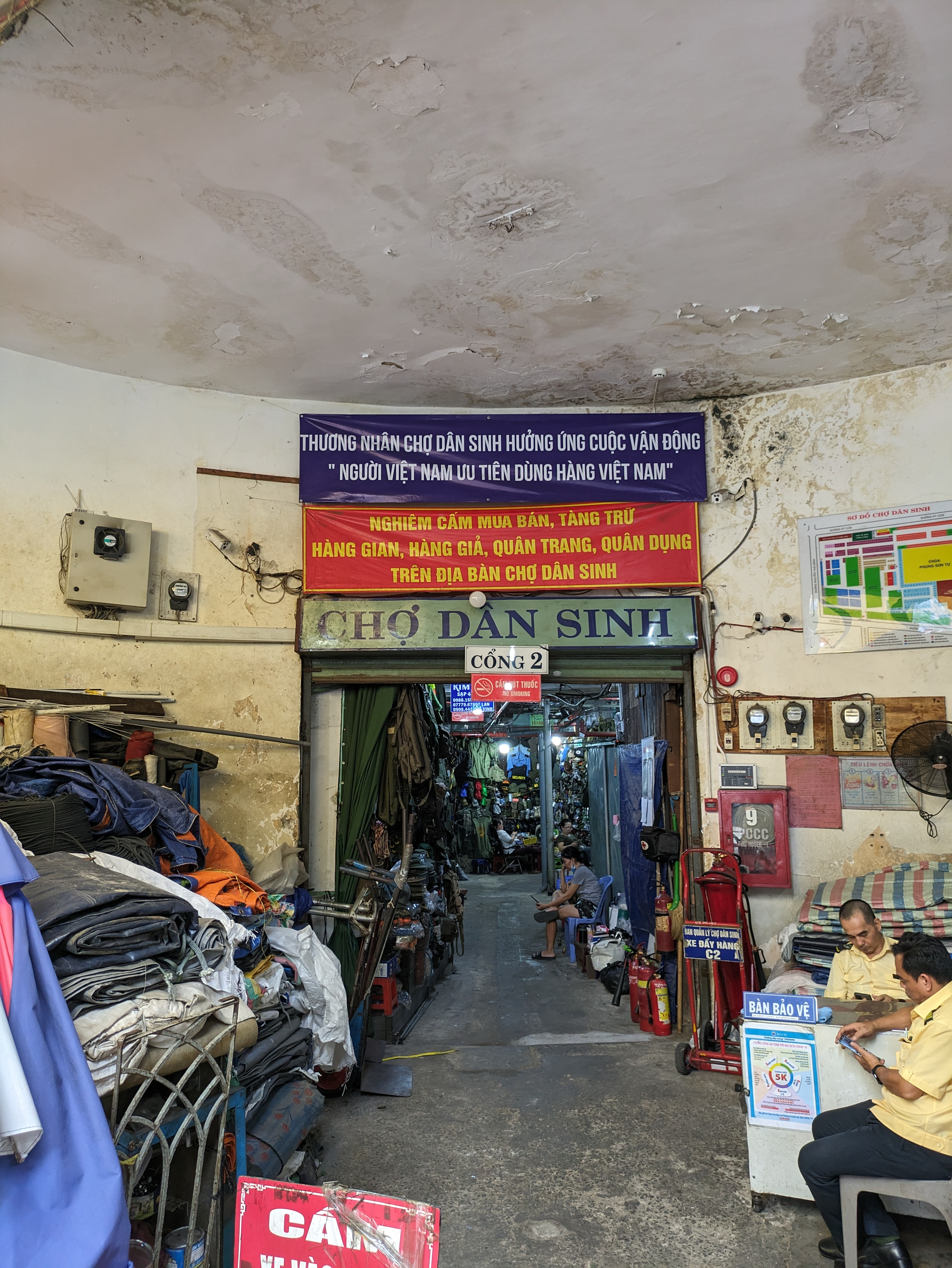
Market entrance

Dân Sinh Market (Vietnamese: Chợ Dân Sinh), also known as American Market or Yersin Market, is a retail market in District 1, Ho Chi Minh City. Located on Yersin Street (named after French microbiologist Alexandre Yersin), the market is known for selling Vietnam War-era American memorabilia and military surplus.
