= Lycée Français International Marguerite Duras =

French international school in Ho Chi Minh City

Location
- Route N°11 – Long Binh – District 9 Hô Chi Minh-Ville
- Coordinates: 10.8705226°N 106.82435989999999°E

Information
- Type: Public, international school
- Website: lfiduras.com

Lycée Français International Marguerite Duras is a French international school in Long Binh, District 9, Ho Chi Minh City (Saigon). It is about 40 minutes from the centre of the city. It covers maternelle, through the final year of lycée (senior high school).

It is directly operated by the Agency for French Education Abroad (AEFE), an agency of the French government.

== See also ==
- Lycée français Alexandre Yersin – French international school in Hanoi
