= Yersin Museum =

Science museum in Nha Trang, Vietnam

Alexandre Yersin Museum
- Bảo tàng Alexandre Yersin, Bảo tàng Yersin
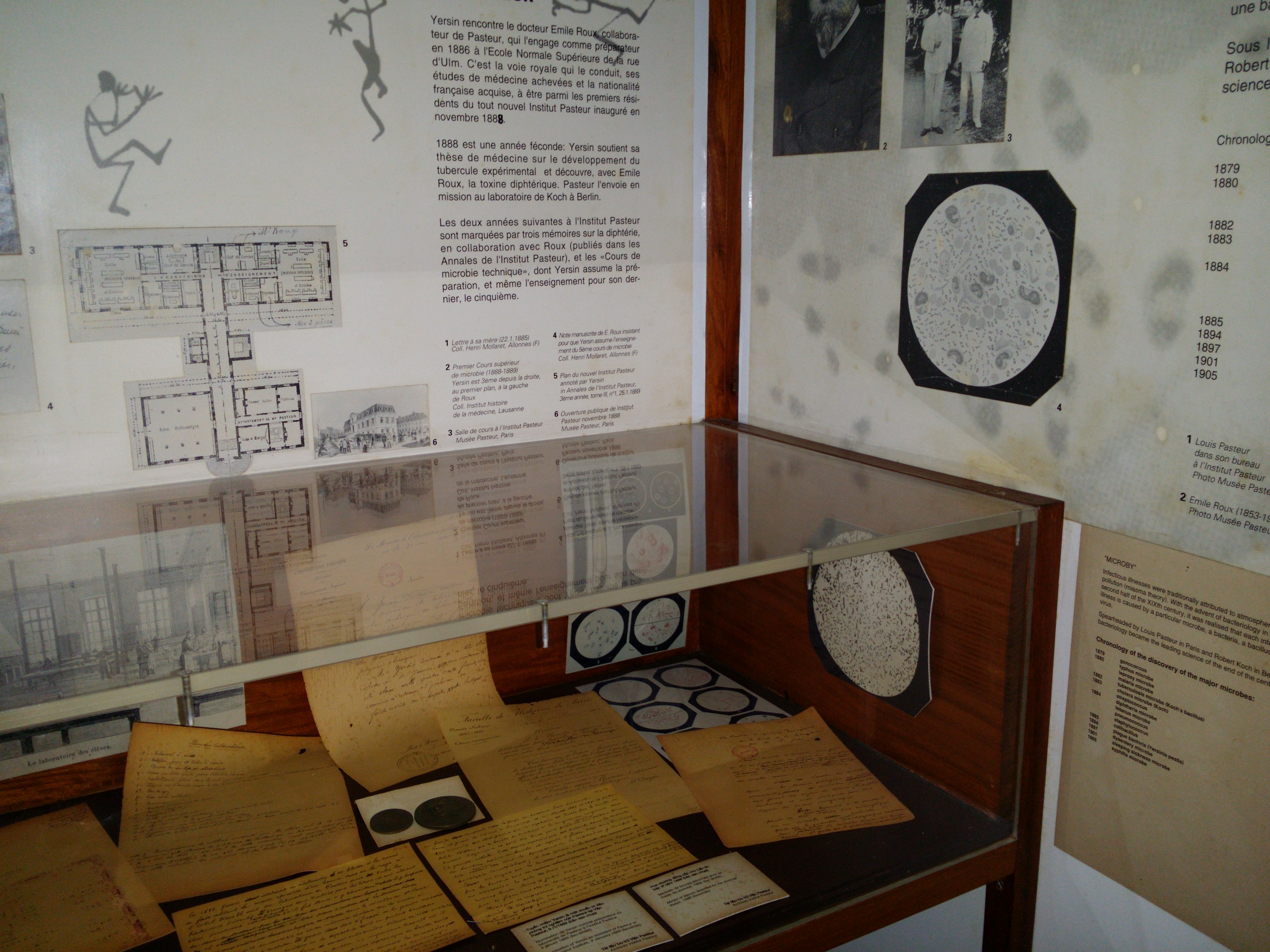
- Inside Yersin Museum in Nha Trang, Vietnam
- Interactive map of the Alexandre Yersin Museum area
- Alternative names: Yersin Museum

General information
- Location: 8–10 Trần Phú Boulevard, Xương Huân, Nha Trang, Vietnam
- Coordinates: 12°15′5.4″N 109°11′45.6″E
- Current tenants: Storage for memorabilia of doctor Alexandre Yersin
- Inaugurated: 1997

Technical details
- Floor area: 100 square metres (1,100 sq ft)

The Alexandre Yersin Museum, or simply known as Yersin Museum, is a museum in Nha Trang, Vietnam. It is dedicated to Alexandre Yersin, the French-Swiss bacteriologist.

It is located on 8–10 Trần Phú Boulevard, also the former home of Yersin and in the enclosure of the Pasteur Institute.

The museum contains a large collection of Yersin's research pieces of equipment and letters as well as provides a description of his contributions to bacteriology, medicine, and science. The captions are in French with accompanied English and Vietnamese translations.

It is open from 8 am until 11 am and 2 pm until 4:30 pm on weekdays and closed on Saturdays and Sundays. The entry fee is VND 26,000 for adults.
