= Alexandre Yersin =

Swiss-born French physician and microbiologist

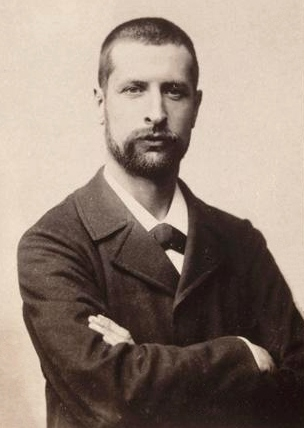
- Alexandre Émile John Yersin
- Born: 22 September 1863; Aubonne, Vaud, Switzerland
- Died: 1 March 1943 (aged 79); Nha Trang, Annam, French Indochina
- Citizenship: French
- Known for: Yersinia pestis, Da Lat Plateau
- Awards: Leconte Prize (1927)
- Scientific career
- Fields: Bacteriology
- Workplaces: École Normale Supérieure, Institut Pasteur

Alexandre Émile John Yersin (22 September 1863 – 1 March 1943) was a Swiss-French physician and bacteriologist. He is remembered for his work as a pioneer in microbiology and immunology. Yersin is the co-discoverer of both the Diphtheria and Tetanus toxins (1890 with Émile Roux) and of the bacillus responsible for the bubonic plague (1894, with Kitasato Shibasaburō). The bacteria was later named in his honour: Yersinia pestis. Yersin also demonstrated for the first time that the same bacillus was present in the rodent as well as in the human disease, thus underlining the possible means of transmission.

== Early life and education ==
Yersin was born in 1863 in Aubonne, in the canton of Vaud, Switzerland, the youngest of three sons. His father, also named Alexandre (1825-1863), was the gunpowder superintendent for French-speaking Switzerland, based in La Vaux, in the Aubonne valley, and also a professor of natural sciences at the colleges of Aubonne and Morges and was passionate about studying insects. He died of a cerebral hemorrhage shortly before Alexandre's birth. Yersin's mother, Fanny-Isaline-Emilie Moschell raised their three children (Émilie, Franck, and Alexandre) alone and settled in Morges, at 11 rue de Lausanne, where she opened a school for girls. From 1883 to 1884 he studied medicine at Lausanne, but then continued his studies at Marburg, and the Hôtel-Dieu de Paris (1884–1886).

== Career ==
In 1886, Yersin entered Louis Pasteur's research laboratory at the École Normale Supérieure, by invitation of Émile Roux, and participated in the development of the anti-rabies serum. In 1888, he received his doctorate with a dissertation titled Étude sur le Développement du Tubercule Expérimental (Study on the Development of Experimental Tubercule) and spent two months with Robert Koch in Germany.

In order to practice medicine in France, Yersin applied for and obtained French nationality in 1888. He then joined the recently created Pasteur Institute in 1889 as Roux's collaborator and together they discovered that Corynebacterium diphtheriae secreted a soluble toxin that was responsible for the effects of diphtheria.

From 1890 to 1894, Yersin became a ship's doctor for the Messageries Maritimes shipping company on the Saigon-Manila line and then on the Saigon-Haiphong line. He participated in one of the Auguste Pavie missions. He led three expeditions across the French Indochina (current Vietnam, Laos and Cambodia) in Southeast Asia. He never returned to Europe.

On 5 June 1894, he was sent, by request of the French government, on a mission to Hong Kong where an outbreak of plague had already caused 100,000 deaths from the plague. Just 15 days later, he isolated the plague bacillus, Yersinia pestis.

In 1895 he returned to the Institute Pasteur in Paris and with Émile Roux, Albert Calmette and Amédée Borrel, prepared the first anti-plague serum. In the same year, he returned to Indochina, where he installed a small laboratory at Nha Trang to manufacture the serum (in 1905 this laboratory became a branch of the Pasteur Institute).

Insignia of colonels in the French Army, with five horizontal lines.

Yersin tried the serum received from Paris in Canton and Amoy, in 1896, and in Bombay, India, in 1897, with disappointing results.

Having decided to stay in French Indochina, Yersin founded the Institut Pasteur in Nha Trang in 1895. While there he studied cattle breeding (to produce anti-plague serum).

Yersin tried his hand at agriculture and was a pioneer in the cultivation of rubber trees (Hevea brasiliensis) For this purpose, he obtained in 1897 a concession from the government to establish an agricultural station at Suoi Dau. He opened a new station at Hon Ba in 1915, where he acclimatized the quinine tree (Cinchona ledgeriana), which was imported from the Andes in South America, and which produced the first known effective remedy for preventing and treating malaria. Yersin's trees enabled Indochina to meet its quinine needs during the Second World War. He also successfully introduced cacao and coffee to Indochina. He participated actively in the creation of the Medical School of Hanoi On 8 January 1902, Yersin was accredited to be the first Headmaster of Hanoi Medical University by the Governor-General of French Indochina, future president of France Paul Doumer.

In 1934 he was nominated honorary director of Pasteur Institute and a member of its Board of Administration.

Alexandre Yersin is well remembered in Vietnam, where he was affectionately called Ông Năm (Mr Nam/Five). This nickname due to his rank as a Colonel in the French army, with five horizontal lines in his army insignia.

== Discovery of exotoxins ==
Roux and Yersin studied filtrates of the Corynebacterium diphtherie bacterium obtained through the porcelain filter set up by Charles Chamberland (1851–1908), one of the closest collaborators of Pasteur. This filtration method excluded the bacteria themselves from the soluble components in the filtrate that are made by the bacteria. Once injected in guinea pigs, the filtrates resulted in the death of the animals. These analyses allowed them to claim that a toxin was created by the bacterium known to cause diphtheria. Furthermore, they also found the same toxin in urine collected from children sick with diphtheria shortly before their deaths. In August 1891, Roux had the opportunity to present his view during the seventh International Congress of Hygiene and Demography in London. "It is natural to conclude that microbes act through their chemical products, true poisons specific to each of them, and which determine the symptoms of the disease in man and in animals. The infectious disease is therefore a poisoning: the source of the poison is the microbe settled in the tissues; it elaborates his toxin there at the expense of the living being that it is going to kill".

The diphtheria toxin was the first bacterial toxin discovered. During their experiments, Emile Roux and his associates observed that this substance could be produced in horses and then extracted in large quantities without causing trauma. They decided to inoculate dozens of children at risk of diphtheria with the serum. Twice as many of the inoculated children survived as had been expected.

Antisera would be made from the diphtheria toxin by Emil von Behring (1854–1917) and Shibasaburo Kitasato (1853–1931), creating the first effective treatment for the disease.

== Discovery of the plague bacterium ==
The first case discovered in Hong Kong was by Scottish doctor James Alfred Lowson, acting superintendent of the Government Civil Hospital, on 8 May 1894. The patient, named "A. Hung", was a ward boy, presumably working in the Government Civil Hospital. "A. Hung" died 5 days later. On 10 May 1894, the city was declared an infected port.

The Japanese government sent Kitasato Shibasaburō, a bacteriologist, to investigate the plague. On 5 June, Kitasato departed Yokohama on SS City of Rio de Janeiro with a team of 5, arriving in Hong Kong on 12 June. On 14 June, Kitasato discovered that the bacillus, now known as Yersinia pestis, was the direct cause of the plague. However, he was doubtful of its significance as the autopsy was done 11 hours after death. His finding was reported by Lowson, who had supported Kitasato's work, to The Lancet. His report was published a week later, on 25 August.

Just three days after Kitasato's arrival, Yersin arrived alone in Hong Kong on 15 June. Yersin had travelled alone from French Indochina, carrying in his baggage a microscope, sterilizer, and culture supplies. He was sent there to investigate the outbreak by the government of France. Unlike Kitasato, Lowson did not offer Yersin support, as Lowson considered France to be a colonial competitor to Great Britain in East Asia. At the hospital, Yersin would find all the cadavers reserved for Kitasato.

Yersin was able to obtain specimens after bribing English sailors responsible for disposing of the bodies of plague victims. Yersin discovered the bacillus on 23 June. Even though Kitasato made the earlier discovery, Kitasato's description lacked precision, and the report was riddled with doubts and confusion.

The two rivals were introduced, but they exchanged little information in their common language of German. The story was related that, at a meeting of the two during an autopsy that Kitasato was conducting, Yersin was surprised to observe that Kitasato was examining blood rather than buboes. Yersin relayed the suggestion via an intermediary that buboes should be examined too, with the result that Kitasato subsequently examined buboes. Both men found bacteria that they designated as the cause of the disease. Yersin correctly described his as Gram-negative, whereas Kitasato insisted that his organism was Gram-positive. Kitasato described his blood organism as diplococcal and his bubo organism as bacillary, causing confusion and suggesting to some that his cultures were contaminated by the pneumococcus. In the ensuing months and years, Kitasato asserted that his bacillus was different from that of Yersin.

During his first autopsy in Hong Kong, he related his method of obtaining fluid from the bubo, seeing Gram-negative bacilli, injecting animals that he observed to die with bacteria in their tissues, and sealing a bubo specimen in a glass tube that was immediately mailed to Paris. These specimens were received by Albert Calmette and Amedee Borrel who confirmed Yersin’s findings and carried out research with the bacteria to produce a therapeutic antiserum. Yersin was also able to demonstrate for the first time that the same bacillus was present in the rodent as well as in the human disease, thus underlining the possible means of transmission. This important discovery was communicated to the French Academy of Sciences in the same year, by his colleague Emile Duclaux, in a classic paper titled "La peste bubonique à Hong-Kong".

In 1895, Yersin returned to Paris to collaborate with his associates in Pasteur’s laboratories. Before the end of that year, he was back in Indochina, and in 1896 he went to Hong Kong again to treat plague victims with his new antiserum.

The name of the organism underwent several changes. It was Bacterium pestis until 1900, when it changed to Bacillus pestis. In 1923, it acquired a new designation as Pasteurella pestis, which it kept up to about 1970, when Yersin obtained posthumous honour through its final name, Yersinia pestis.

A 1976 thorough analysis of the morphology of the organism discovered by Kitasato determined that "we are confident that Kitasato had examined the plague bacillus in Hong Kong in late June and early July 1894", only days after Yersin announced his own discovery on 20 June, and that Kitasato "should not be denied this credit".

== Death and legacy in Vietnam ==
Yersin died of myocarditis at his home in Nha Trang, in 1943. His coffin was followed by a huge crowd eager to pay tribute to this man who respected the elderly, provided free medical care to the poorest, and adored children.

Following the country's independence, streets named in his honor kept their designation and his tomb in Suối Dầu was graced by a pagoda where rites are performed in his worship. Yersin Market in Ho Chi Minh City was named after him. His house in Nha Trang is now the Yersin Museum, and the epitaph on his tombstone describes him as a "Benefactor and humanist, venerated by the Vietnamese people".

In Hanoi, the Lycée français Alexandre Yersin, a French international school was named after him.

A private university founded in 2004 in Da Lat was named "Yersin University" in his honour [Trường Đại Học Yersin Đà Lạt].

== Miscellaneous ==
Dr Yersin was credited with founding the site for the new town of Da Lat in 1893. Because of the high altitude and European-like climate, Da Lat became an R&R spot for French officers. There was a high school named after him which was built in the 1920s, the Lycée Yersin, aka Grand Lycée (grade 6 to 12), the Petit Lycée (elementary to grade 5), and a university named after him which was built in the 2000s.

While in Hong Kong, Yersin was helped in his research by an Italian priest of the PIME order named Bernardo Vigano. He provided cadavers and assisted with his quest to find a remedy for the plague.

== Bibliography ==
=== English ===
- Barrett, O. (May 1989). "Alexandre Yersin and recollections of Vietnam". Hosp. Pract. (Off. Ed.). 24 (5A): 13. PMID 2498345.
- Bendiner, E. (March 1989). "Alexandre Yersin: pursuer of plague". Hosp. Pract. (Off. Ed.). 24 (3A): 121–8, 131–2, 135–8 passim. PMID 2494200.
- Haubrich, William S. (January 2005). "Yersin of Yersinia infection". Gastroenterology. 128 (1): 23. doi:10.1053/j.gastro.2004.11.040. PMID 15633119.
- Holubar, K. (1999). "Alexandre Yersin (1863-1943) and the centenary of the plague in Nha Trang: A threat transformed". Dermatology. 198 (1): 108–9. doi:10.1159/000018052. PMID 10026422. S2CID 39702321.
- Howard-Jones, N. (April 1975). Kitasato, Yersin, and the plague bacillus. Clio Medica (Amsterdam, Netherlands). Vol. 10. pp. 23–7. PMID 54239.
- Moseley, J. E. (1981). "Travels of Alexandre Yersin: letters of a pastorian in Indochina, 1890–1894". Perspect. Biol. Med. 24 (4): 607–18. doi:10.1353/pbm.1981.0043. PMID 7027173. S2CID 27192713.
- Rosenberg, J. C. (February 1968). "Doctors afield: Alexandre Yersin". N. Engl. J. Med. 278 (5): 261–3. doi:10.1056/NEJM196802012780507. PMID 4865333.
- Solomon, T. (June 1995). "Alexandre Yersin and the plague bacillus". The Journal of Tropical Medicine and Hygiene. 98 (3): 209–12. PMID 7783282.

=== French ===
- Bernard, L. (May 1994). "[Memories of Monsieur Yersin]". Revue médicale de la Suisse romande. 114 (5): 439–44. PMID 8016523.
- Bonard, E. C. (May 1994). "[The plague and Alexander Yersin (1863–1943)]". Revue médicale de la Suisse romande. 114 (5): 389–91. PMID 8016516.
- Bonard, E. C. (December 1972). "[Two letters from Alexandre Yersin]". Revue médicale de la Suisse romande. 92 (12): 995–1000. PMID 4578823.
- Bonifas, V. (May 1984). "[Alexandre Yersin (1863–1943)]". Revue médicale de la Suisse romande. 104 (5): 349–51. PMID 6379813.
- Brossollet, J. (May 1994). "[Correspondence of Alexander Yersin to his family]". Revue médicale de la Suisse romande. 114 (5): 445–50. PMID 8016524.
- Delaveau, P.; Clair G. (1995). "[Production of cinchona in the French empire: A. Yersin and E. Perrot]". Revue d'histoire de la pharmacie. 42 (304): 75–84. doi:10.3406/pharm.1995.4211. PMID 11640400.
- Patrick Deville, Peste et choléra, éditions du Seuil, collection « Fiction & Cie », 2012 (ISBN 978-2-02-107720-9).
- Dreifuss, J.-J. (May 1994). "[Discoveries and deceptions: Yersin from Hong Kong to Stockholm]". Revue médicale de la Suisse romande. 114 (5): 425–8. PMID 8016521.
- Fantini, B. (May 1994). "[A young Pasteur scientist with Koch: Yersin, 1888]". Revue médicale de la Suisse romande. 114 (5): 429–37. PMID 8016522.
- Kupferschmidt, H. (May 1994). "[Development of research on plague following the discovery of the bacillus by Alexander Yersin]". Revue médicale de la Suisse romande. 114 (5): 415–23. PMID 8016520.
- Mafart, Y. (1965). "[Alexandre Yersin (1863–1943)]". Médecine Tropicale: Revue du Corps de Santé Colonial. 25 (4): 427–38. PMID 5320482.
- Pilet, P. E. (May 1994). "[Yersin Senior and son. From biology to medicine]". Revue médicale de la Suisse romande. 114 (5): 405–14. PMID 8016519.

=== Other languages ===
- Bockemühl, J. (April 1994). "[100 years after the discovery of the plague-causing agent—importance and veneration of Alexandre Yersin in Vietnam today]". Immun. Infekt. 22 (2): 72–5. PMID 7959865.
- Raggenbass, R. (1995). "[Blackwater fever: a French episode drawn from the research of Alexandre Yersin]". Gesnerus. 52 (3–4): 264–89. PMID 8851059.
