= Lycée Yersin =

Dalat College Trường Cao đẳng Đà Lạt
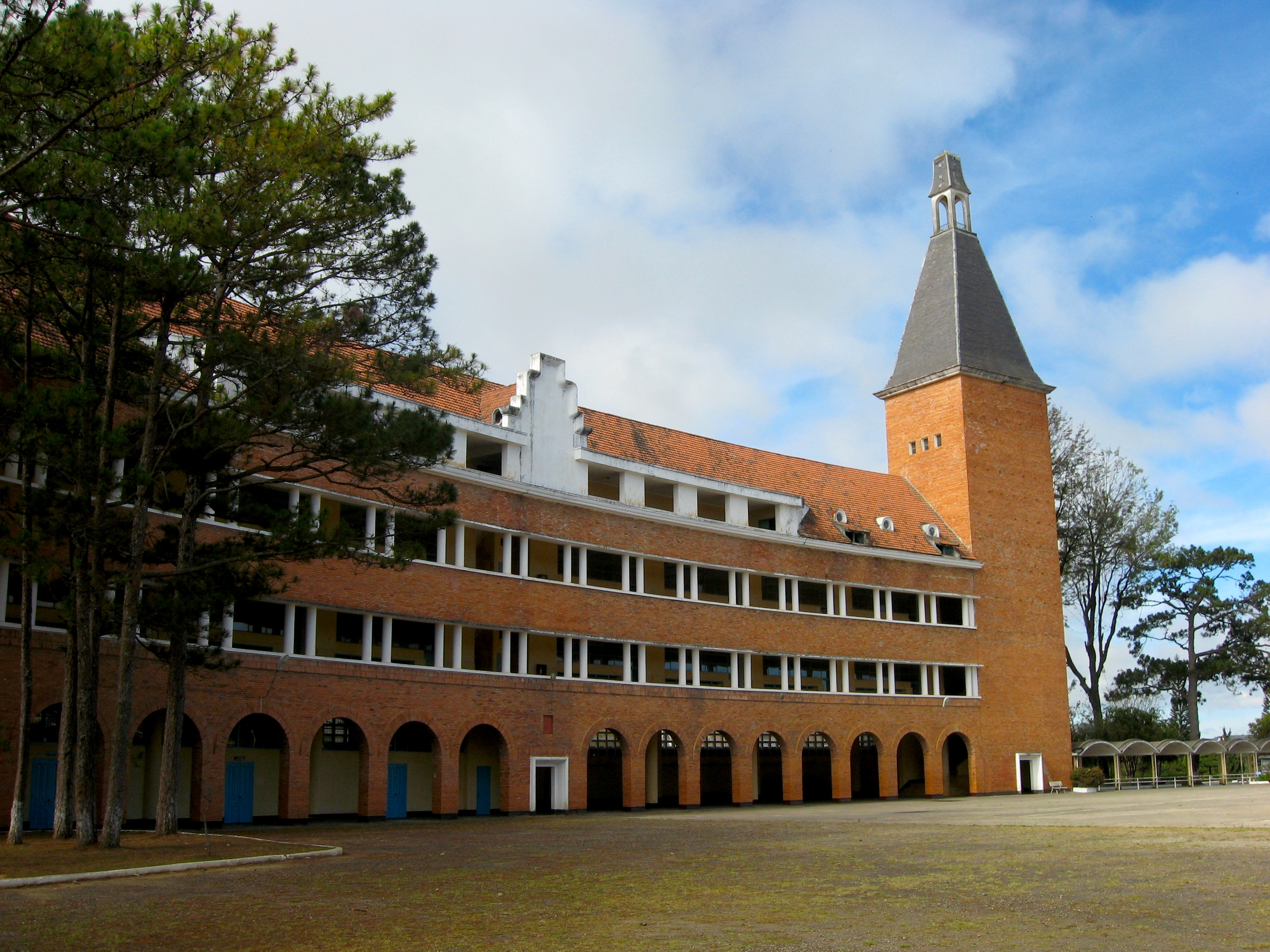
- The Pedagogical College of Da Lat in 2011

Location
- 109 Yersin, Xuân Hương; Central Highlands; Đà Lạt, Lâm Đồng province Vietnam
- Coordinates: 11.945519°N 108.452753°E

Information
- Former name: Lycée Yersin
- School type: College
- Established: 16 July 1927
- Campus type: Urban
- Website: cdspdalat.edu.vn

The Lycée Yersin was a school founded in 1927 in Da Lat, Vietnam, to educate the children of French colonialists and upper class Vietnamese.

After various changes, it is now the Pedagogical College of Da Lat (Vietnamese: Trường Cao đẳng Sư phạm Đà Lạt), a teachers' training college intil August 2022 when it merged with Da Lat Vocational Training College (Trường Cao đẳng Nghề Đà Lạt) and Lam Dong Technical – Economic College (Trường Cao đẳng Kinh tế – Kỹ Thuật Lâm Đồng) to be an institution simply called as Dalat College or College of Dalat (Trường Cao đẳng Đà Lạt).

== Building ==
The building stands on a plateau. From one side it overlooks the great lake of Dalat, and from the other side looks over the valley where the railway station was built. The French architect Paul Moncet designed the building and supervised its construction. The building was constructed of red bricks imported from Europe. The roof was also made from material imported from France, but has since been restored. The main building is three stories high, with 24 rooms, with a 54 metres (177 ft) bell tower. The building describes an arc. There are traces of a large clock on the exterior of the bell tower. It has been recognized by the World Association of Architects as one of the 1,000 original buildings of the 20th century.

== Colonial era ==
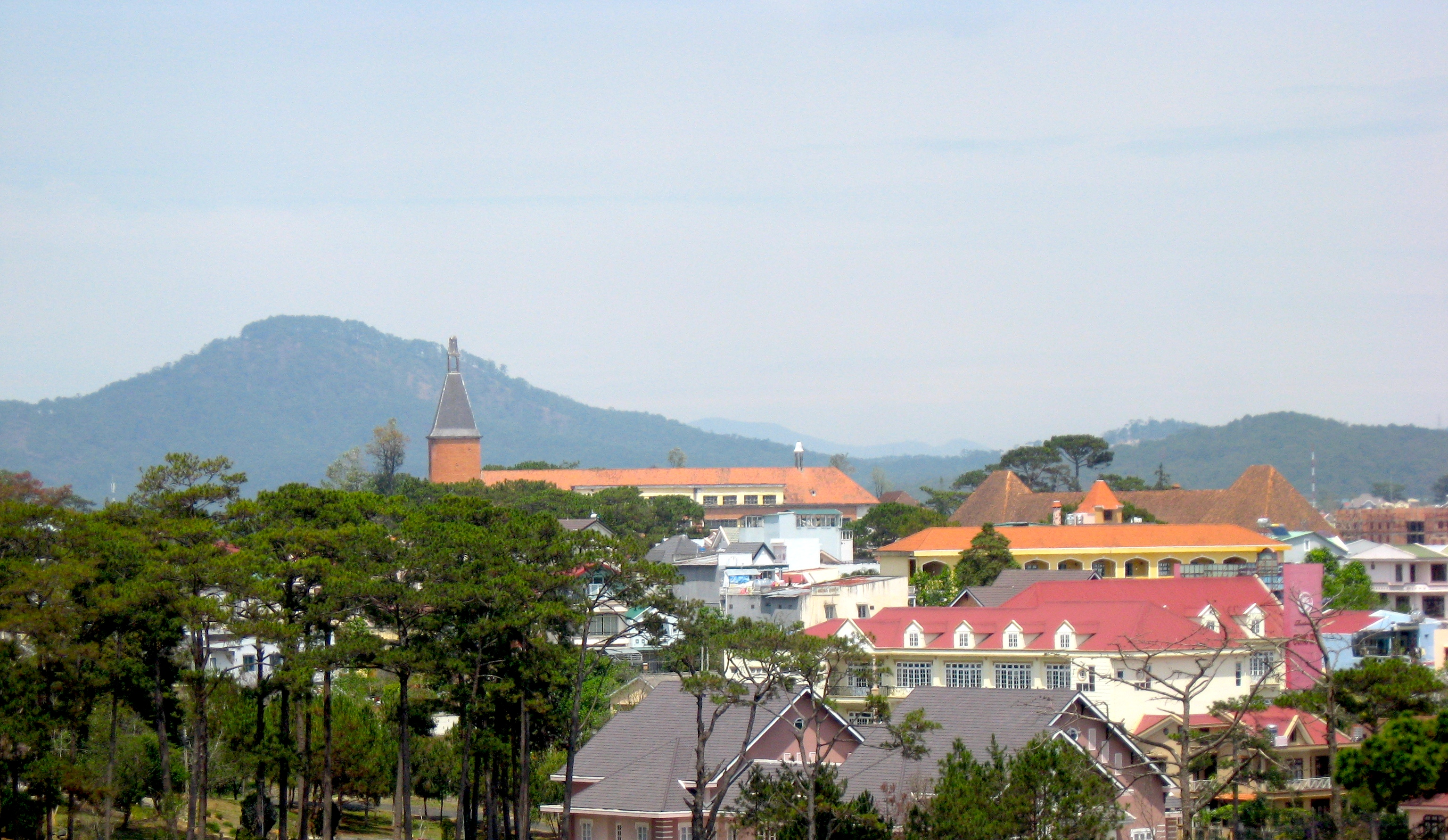
Surroundings

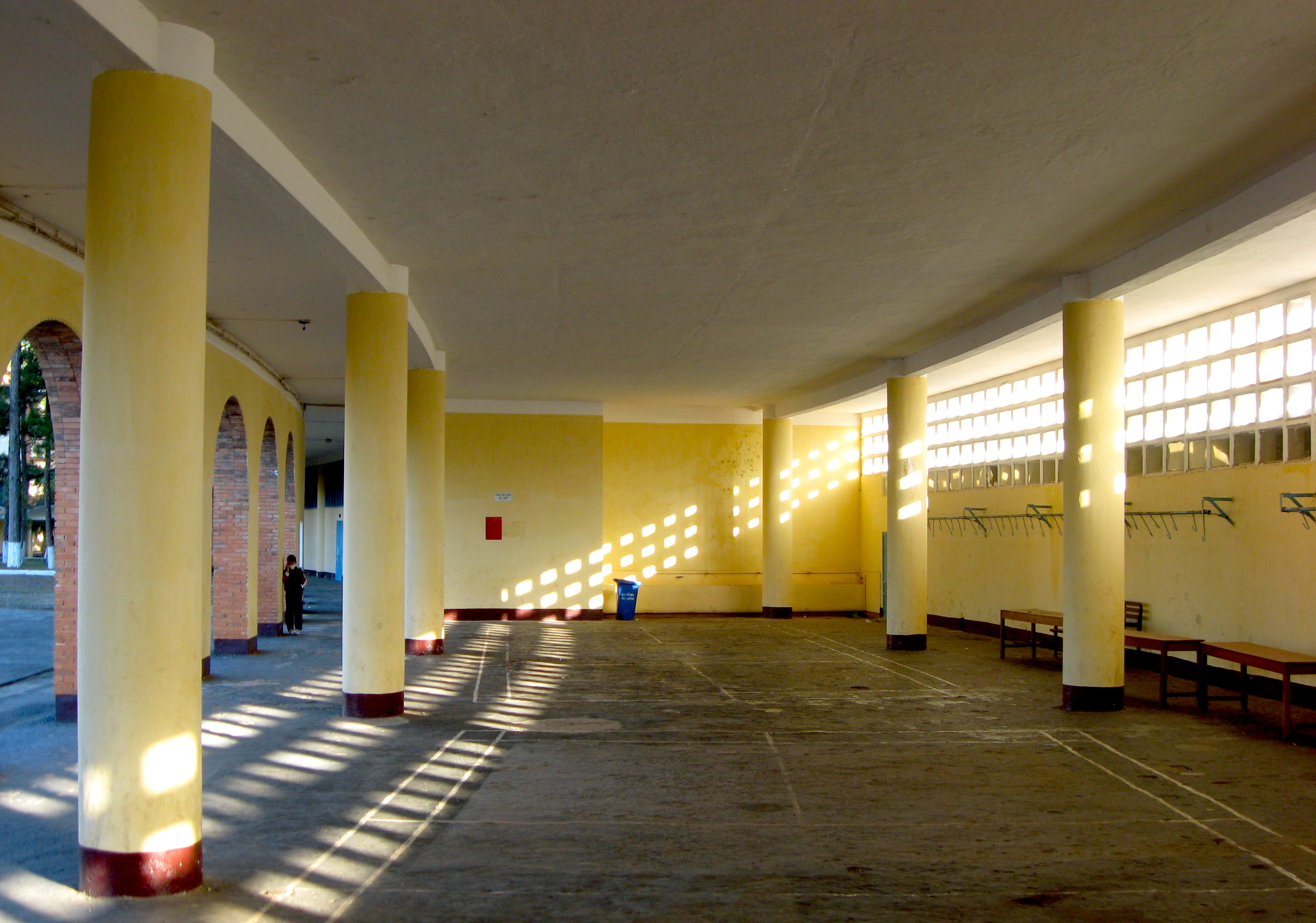
Ground floor room

The hill station of Da Lat had boarding schools that served all of Vietnam. It had been seen as a possible center of government that would be hygienic and segregated between Europeans and Vietnamese. The Petit Lycée de Dalat was created by decree on 16 July 1927, opened on 16 September 1927, and was open for boarders on 7 January 1928. A primary and secondary school, it was restricted to European children. However, the proliferation of the Vietnamese elite in the town made it increasingly impracticable to practice segregation. The Lycée de Dalat, or Grand Lycée, was also founded in 1927, open to French children and the children of the Vietnamese elite. It was a French-style lycée, or secondary school. On 10 May 1935, it took the name Lycée Yersin in honor of Dr. Alexandre Yersin. When the governor-general Jules Brévié visited Da Lat he told a racially mixed set of students at the Lycée Yersin on 12 July 1938,

At points on the globe where there is contact between different races an incredible effervescence is developing. We must prevent this from degenerating into chronic disorder; we must re-establish the harmony essential for the well-being of men and the progress of societies in all aspects. This is the role vested in you, by the very fact of your presence in a place where these transformations are occurring.

The elite "native" children were expected to absorb French culture and values, and actively assist in the colonial process. In 1936 the municipal council noted that the students at the Lycee Yersin included young Siamese children. There were growing numbers of children from the elite "native" families in the 1930s. In 1942 the pupils included the sons of the Cambodian Minister of Finance. The Vietnamese and Cambodian children often achieved the best results. Both Bảo Đại (1913–97) and Norodom Sihanouk (1922–2012) studied at the school.

The school and teaching materials were damaged during the Japanese occupation in World War II. It was restored to the extent possible after 1945. A brochure for the Lycée Yersin from 1948 depicted a column of highland people on its cover. The text made no mention of this minority group, whose children were not educated at the school. In 1948 the lycée sent five pupils to the École Polytechnique in Paris, three French, one Vietnamese and one Cambodian. As late as 1950, more French than Vietnamese graduated from the school. In the early 1950s the emperor Bảo Đại granted scholarships so young highlanders, mostly the sons of chiefs or of civil servants, could attend the Lycée Yersin.

== Later years ==
From 1970 to 1975, the college was named as Hung Vuong Education Center, a training facility for primary school teachers. In 1975, it took the name of Da Lat Teachers College. Faculties include Natural Sciences, Social Sciences, Exercise / Music / Art, Primary, Preschool, Political theory.

== Sources ==
- "About Pedagogical College Dalat" (in Vietnamese). Pedagogical College of Da Lat.
- "Dalat (Đà Lạt)". Saigon Vietnam (in French).
- Hickey, Gerald Cannon (2002). Window on a War: An Anthropologist in the Vietnam Conflict. Texas Tech University Press. ISBN 978-0-89672-490-7.
- "Home" (in Vietnamese). Pedagogical College of Da Lat.
- Jennings, Eric T. (2011-04-08). Imperial Heights: Dalat and the Making and Undoing of French Indochina. University of California Press. ISBN 978-0-520-94844-0.
- Peckham, Robert; Pomfret, David M. (2013-01-01). Imperial Contagions: Medicine, Hygiene, and Cultures of Planning in Asia. Hong Kong University Press. ISBN 978-988-8139-12-5.
- Vietnam Discoveries (2015). "Teachers College (Grand Lycee Yersin)".
