= Hòn Bà =

Islet in Vietnam

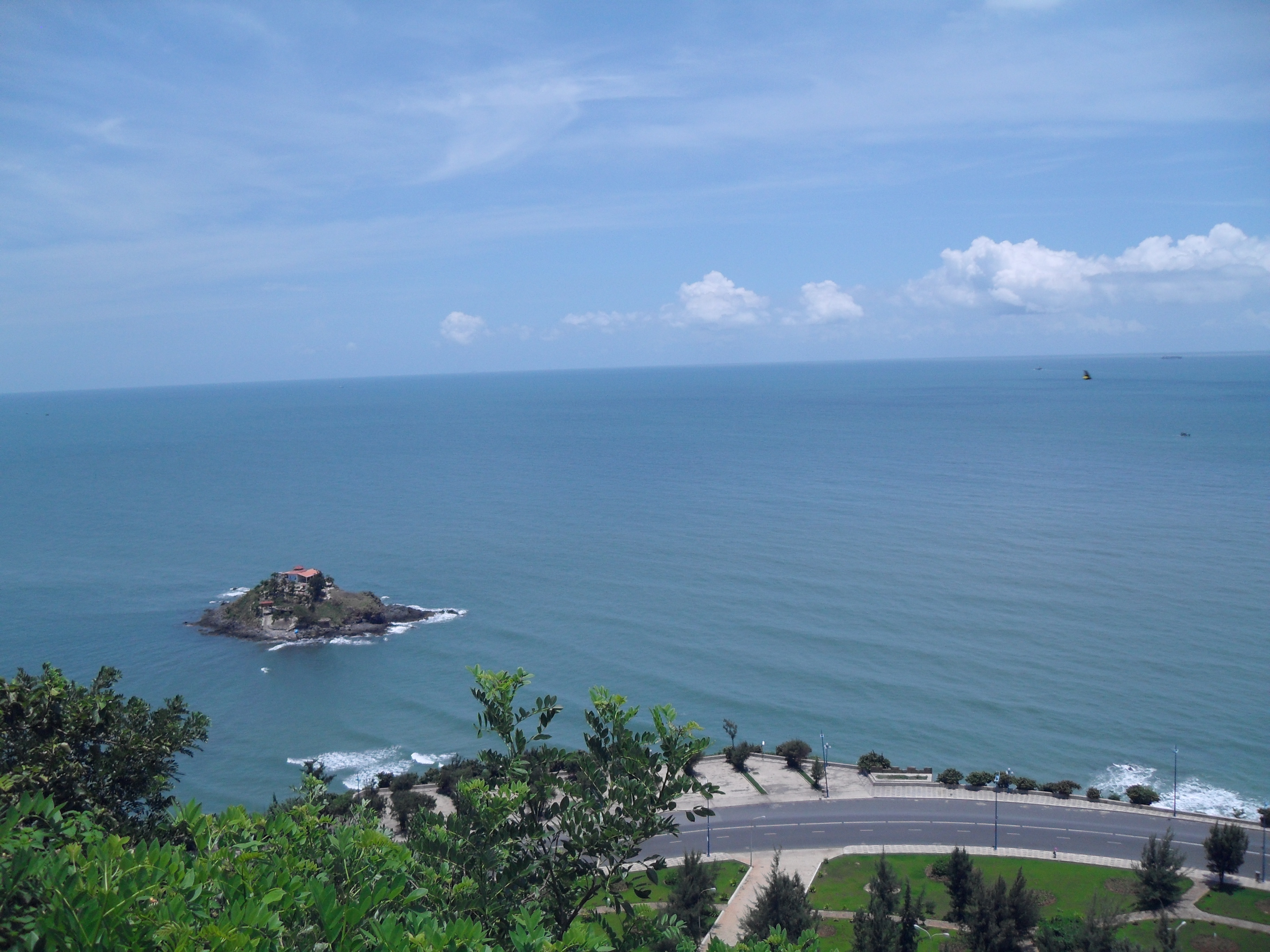
- Hòn Bà island viewed from the Christ the King statue

- Location of Hòn Bà

Geography
- Coordinates: 10°19′26″N 107°05′21″E
- Total islands: 1
- Area: 0.00545 km^{2} (0.00210 sq mi)

Administration
- Vietnam
- Province: Bà Rịa–Vũng Tàu
- City: Vũng Tàu
- Ward: Ward 2

Demographics
- Population: Uninhabited

Hòn Bà is a small rocky island located near the coast of Ward 2 in Vũng Tàu, Bà Rịa–Vũng Tàu province, Vietnam. The island, also known historically as Ile Archinard by the French, features a temple and is a popular site for spiritual tourism and scenic views.

== Geography ==
Hòn Bà lies approximately 220 meters from the foot of Núi Nhỏ (Small Mountain) and has an area of 5,450 square meters (0.00545 km²). During low tide, a natural stone path emerges, connecting the island to Ô Quắn Beach at the base of the mountain, allowing visitors to walk to the island. This path is visible irregularly depending on tidal conditions and is a notable attraction for tourists.

== Temple ==
The island is home to Miếu Bà (Lady Temple), a small shrine dedicated to spiritual worship. The temple was constructed in 1881 by Hồ Quang Minh, a native of central Vietnam.

In 1939, a French officer named Archinard attempted to destroy the temple with gunfire but caused minimal damage. He subsequently died at the site, leading the French to name the island Ile Archinard, though locals continued to refer to it as Hòn Bà.

The temple was renovated in 1971 by a resident from Trà Vinh province, who organized community contributions for its restoration. Today, it serves as a site for spiritual tourism, attracting visitors who come to pray and enjoy the scenic surroundings.
