= Lycée français Alexandre Yersin =

- Trường quốc tế Pháp Alexandre Yersin

Location
- 44 Gia Thuong, Ngoc Thuy, Long Bien, Hanoi
- Coordinates: 21.0609°N 105.8683°E

Information
- Type: Public, International school
- Established: 1982
- School code: LFAY
- Director: Corinne Chan Yue Tack
- Affiliation: AEFE
- Website: lfay.com.vn

The Lycée français Alexandre Yersin (LFAY) is a French international school in Long Bien District, Hanoi, Vietnam. It is directly operated by the Agency for French Education Abroad (AEFE), an agency of the French government which oversees education of French national children outside of France.

LFAY teaches children from the ages of 3 to 18 and adopts the French curriculum including the Baccalauréat. The school is known for its high standards and excellent results in the Baccalauréat, with a 95 to 100% success rate and 75 to 100% mentions.

As of the 2022-23 school year, the school has currently 1120 students with 36 nationalities from the petite section (PS: 3-year-olds) to the Terminale.

== History ==
Lycée Français Alexandre Yersin was named after the Alexandre Yersin, a Swiss-French physician who found the pathogens for the bubonic plague. Established in the 1982 in Hanoi, the capital of Vietnam, in order to create collaboration between French and Vietnamese culture, the historic building of the French Lycée Alexandre Yersin de Hanoi is located at 12 Nui Truc Street, in the Ba Dinh district, near some European and Anglo-Saxon embassies.

Facing a growth in inscription demands, a project to build a new high school with integrated sports and artistic facilities was envisaged from the end of the 2000s. The gestation of the project took time due to the difficulty of finding suitable land for the construction of the new building. The construction costs are estimated at 12.5 million euros, including 2 million euros advanced by the AEFE, 6.5 million euros obtained thanks to recourse to advances from France Trésor and reimbursed by the establishment, with 4 million euros drawn from its own resources and available working capital. The construction of the new campus on Gia Thượng road, Long Bien district was validated in 2015 by the AEFE. It was finally inaugurated on November 3, 2018 by French Prime Minister Édouard Philippe during his official trip to Vietnam.

The campus was the first French building constructed in Vietnam since the colonial period.The architectural ensemble manufactured by the organization Cerway, combines the use of modern materials and natural elements such as bamboo facades. It features a rugby/football pitch, heated swimming pool, gymnasium, auditorium and garden.

== Gallery ==
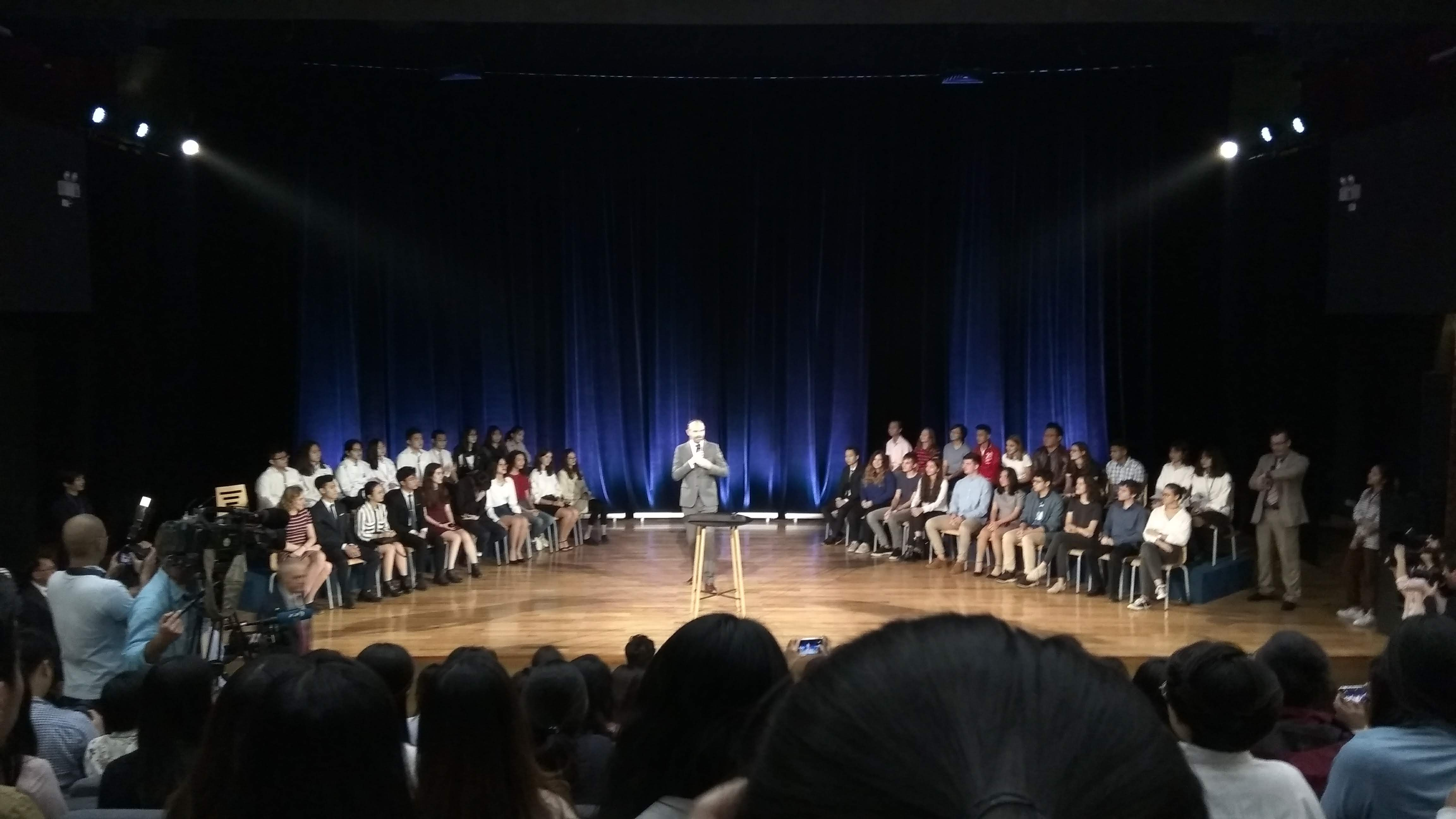
French Prime Minister Édouard Philippe talks with students on the occasion of the opening of the school in Long Biên

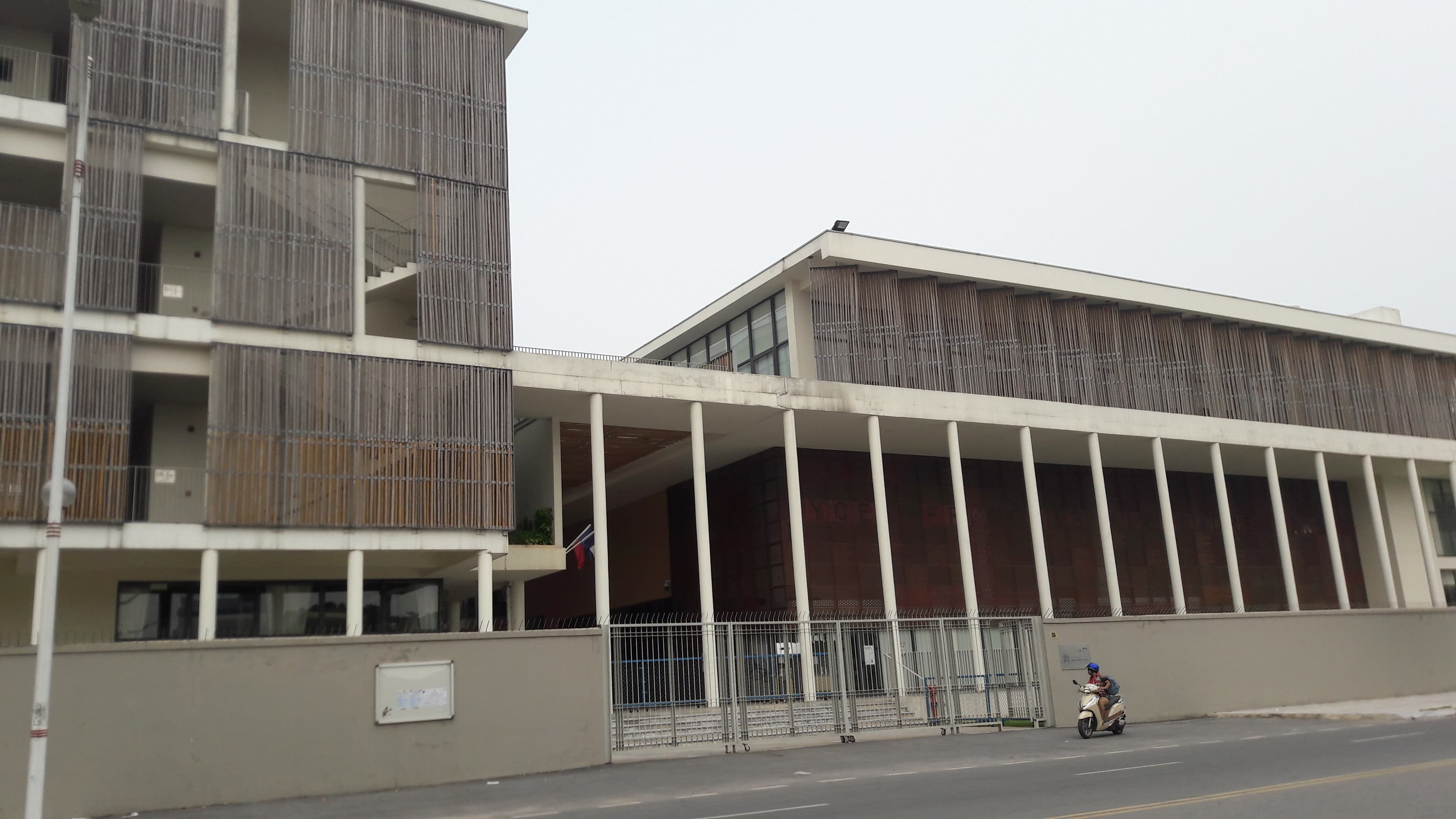
The front gate of the school

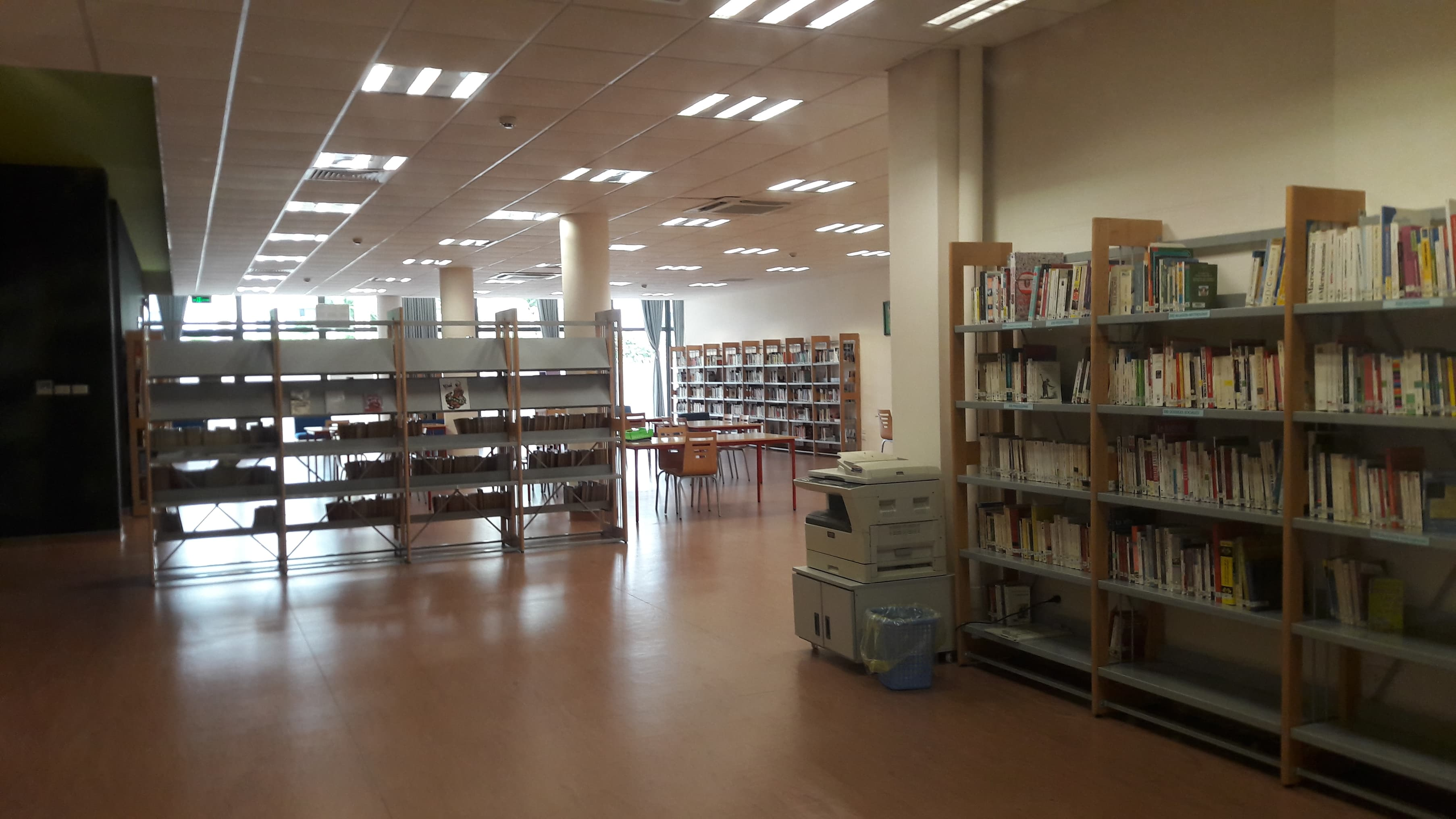
A corner of the school's library

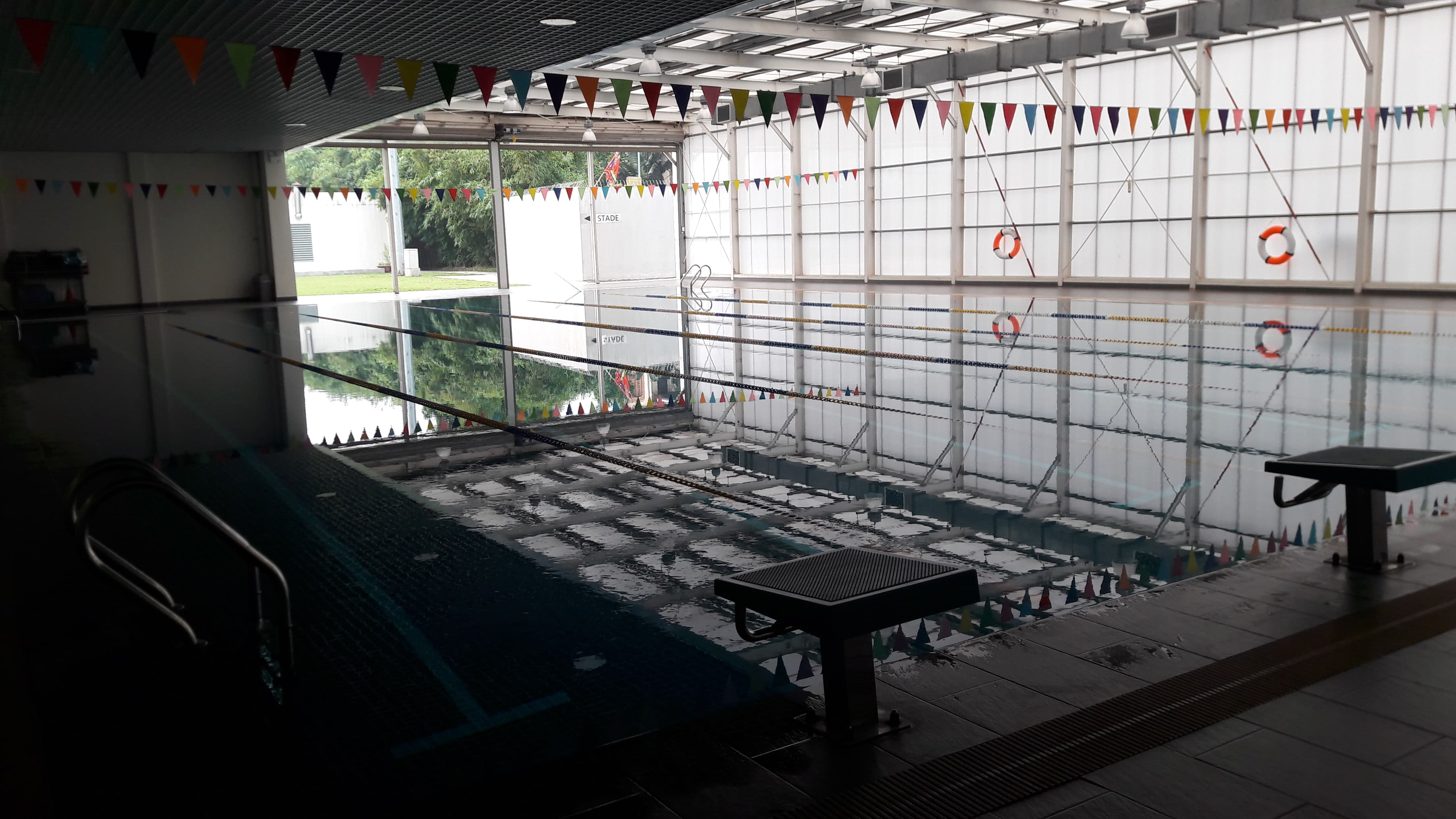
The 25x15m swimming pool

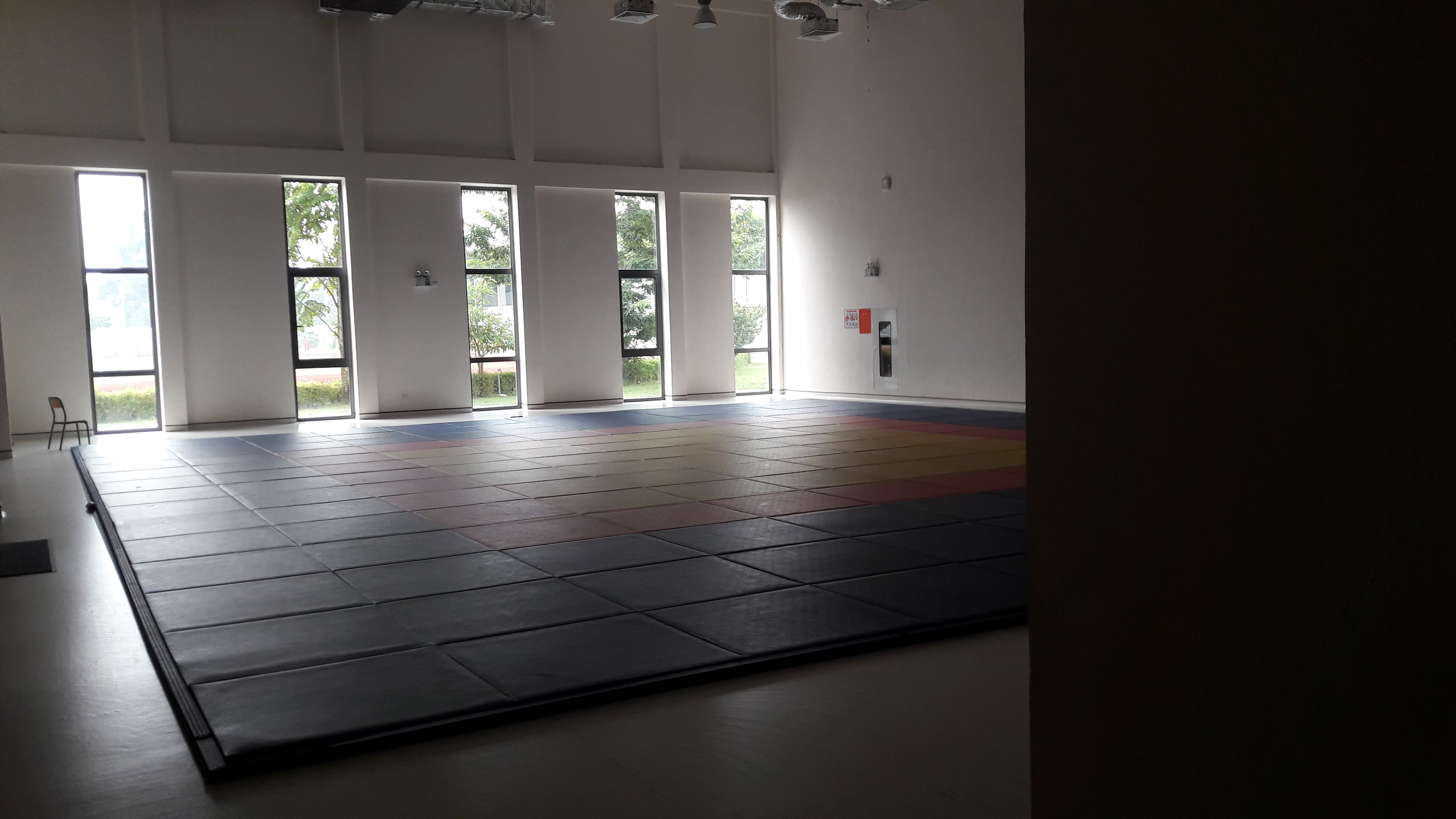
The gymnasium

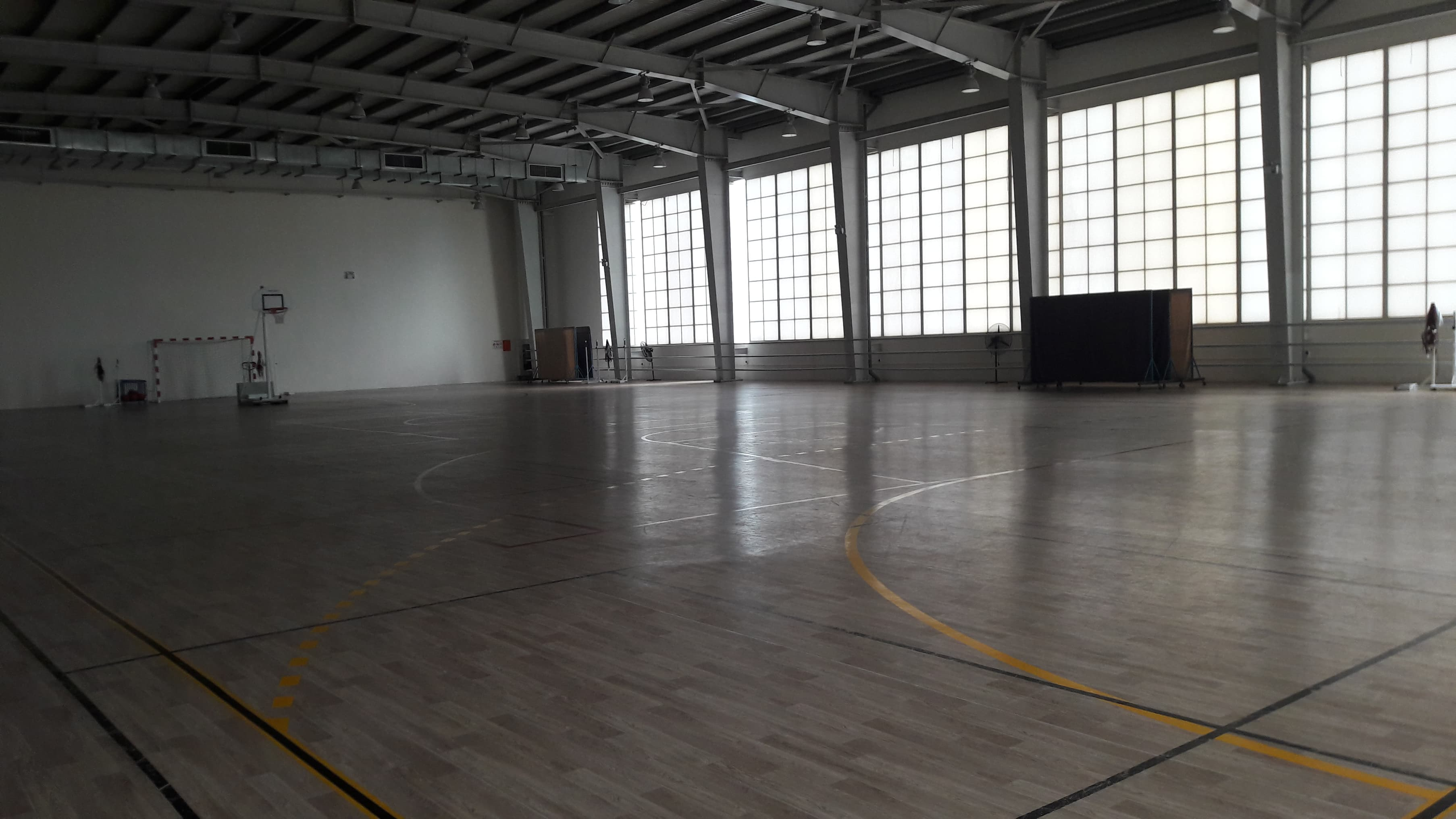
Indoor multi sport court served for handball, basketball, badminton and table-tennis

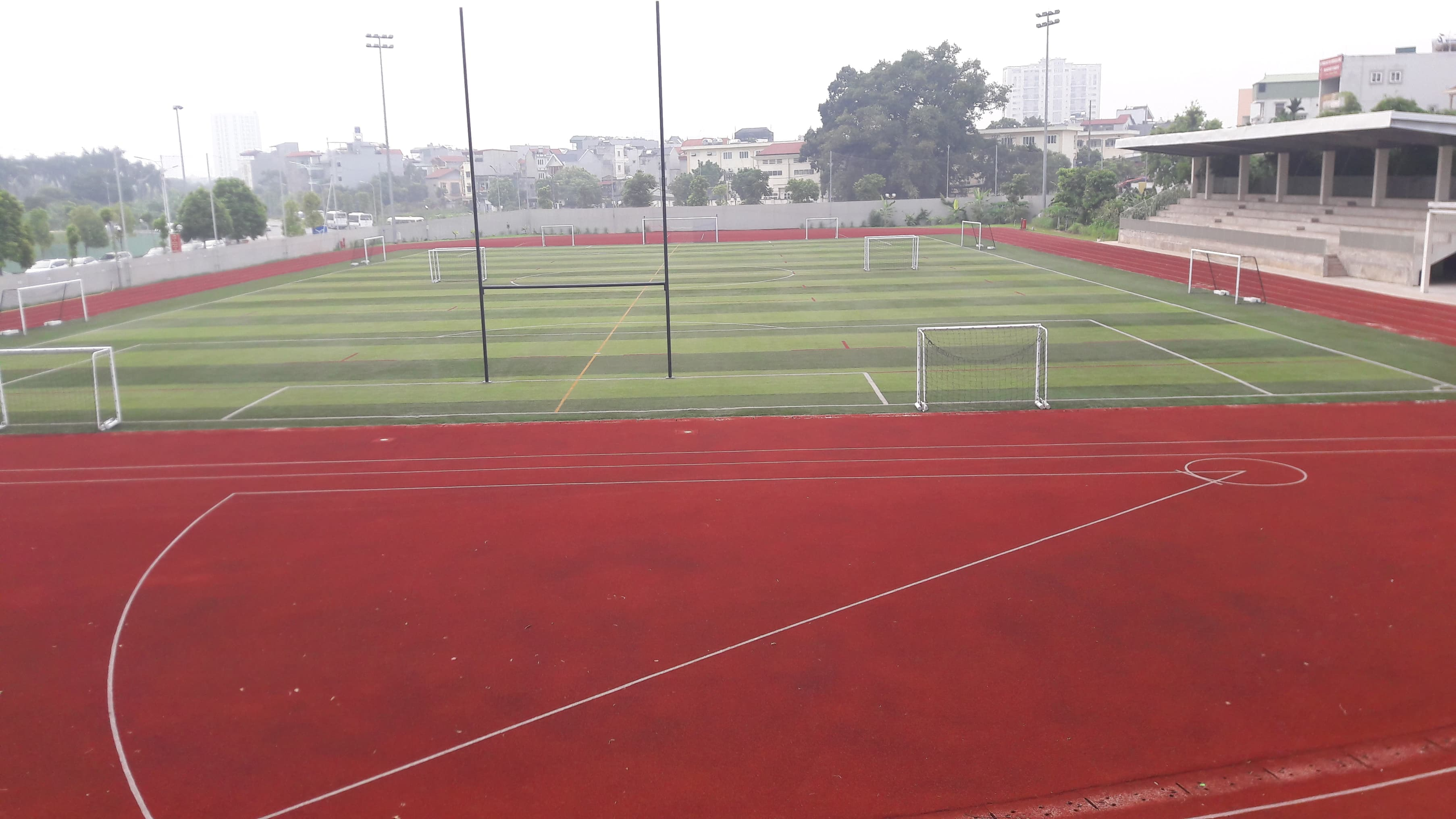
The standard football/rugby field with artificial turf

== Notable alumni ==
- Line Papin, French novelist
- Babetida Sadjo, Belgian actress
- Mỹ Anh, Vietnamese singer/songwriter
- Wren Evans, Vietnamese singer/songwriter
- Nguyễn Nhất Long, Vietnamese golfer, competed at the 2022 Asian Games

== See also ==
- Lycée Français International Marguerite Duras – French international school in Ho Chi Minh City
- Lycée Albert Sarraut – historic French school in Hanoi
