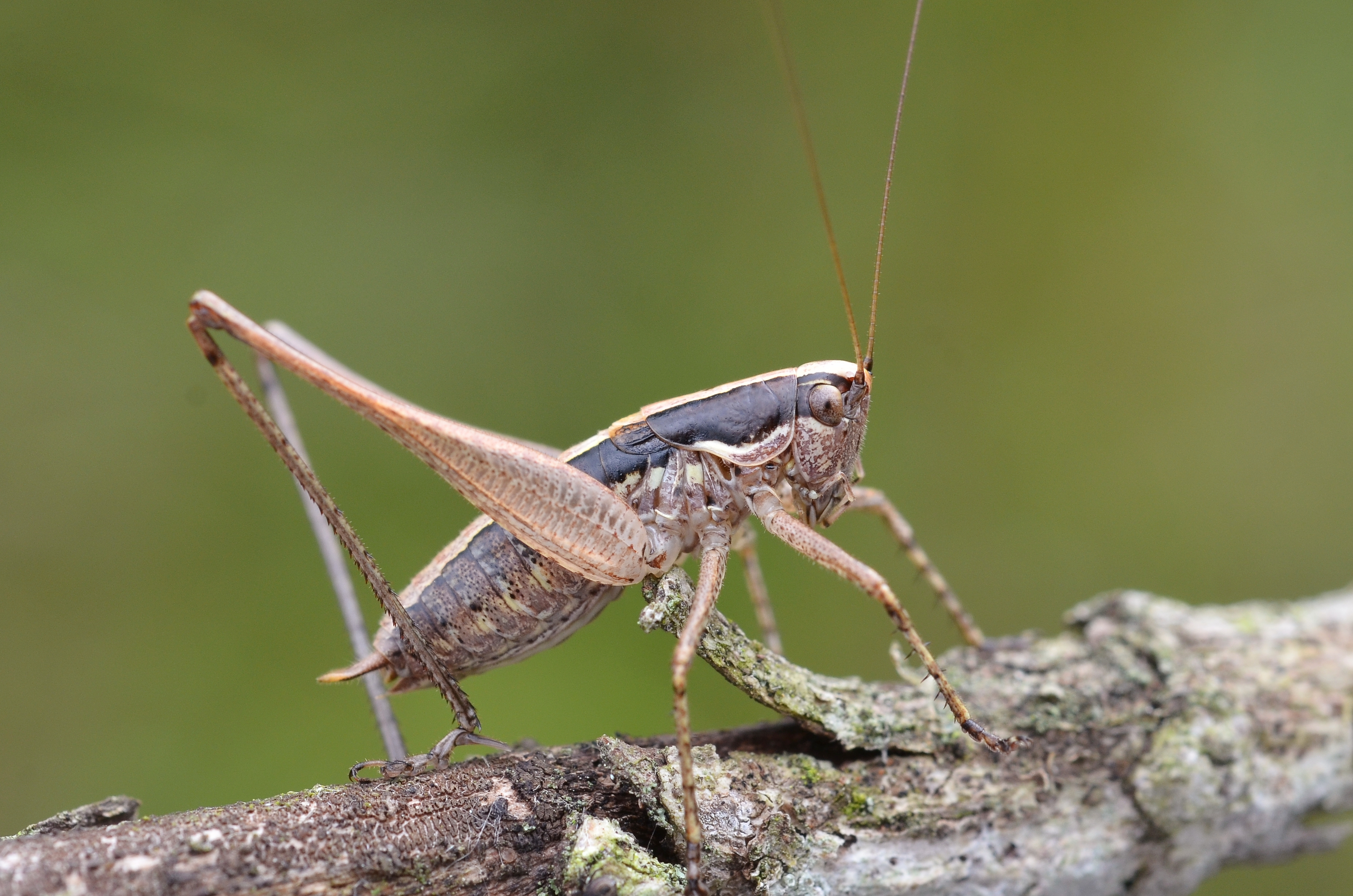

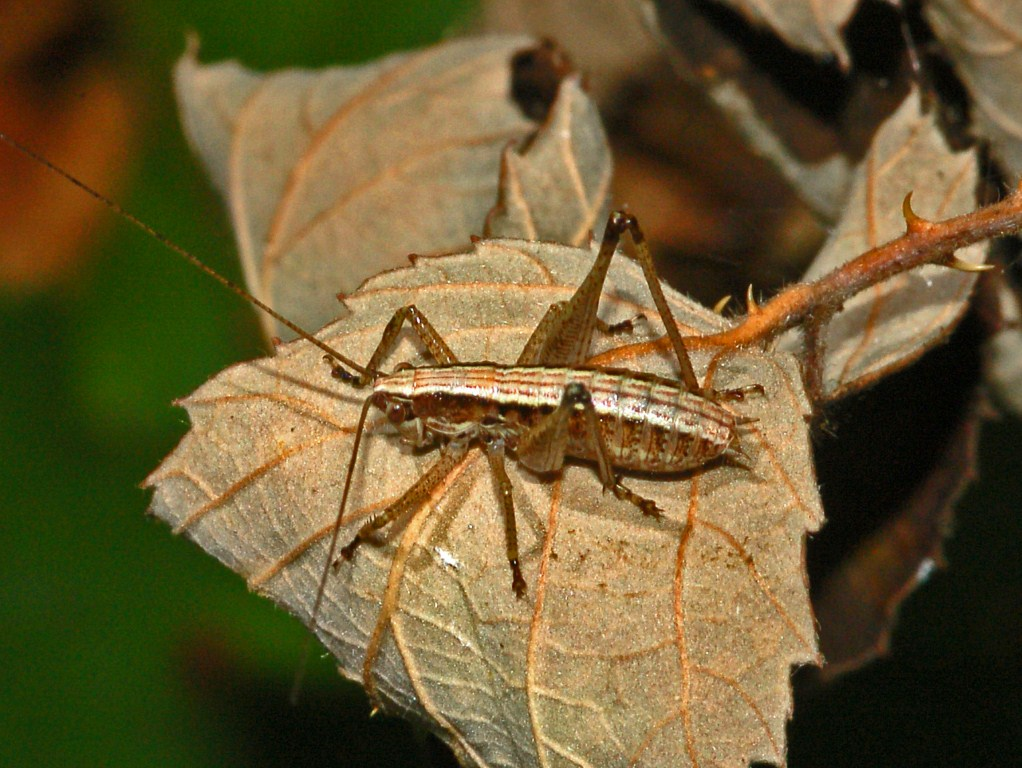

Scientific classification
- Domain: Eukaryota
- Kingdom: Animalia
- Phylum: Arthropoda
- Class: Insecta
- Order: Orthoptera
- Suborder: Ensifera
- Family: Tettigoniidae
- Subfamily: Tettigoniinae
- Tribe: Platycleidini
- Genus: Yersinella; Ramme, 1923

= Yersinella =

Genus of cricket-like animals

Yersinella is a genus of bush crickets in the subfamily Tettigoniinae and tribe Platycleidini. They are native to Europe. The genus name commemorates the entomologist who described the type species in 1860.

== Species ==
The Orthoptera Species File includes:

1. Yersinella beybienkoi La Greca, 1974
2. Yersinella raymondii (Yersin, 1860)
