= Alexander Yersin (entomologist) =

Swiss entomologist (1825–1863)

Jean Alexandre Marc Yersin (5 April 1825, in Morges – 2 September 1863, in Lavaux) was a Swiss entomologist.

Jean Alexandre Marc Yersin was a teacher and entomologist.

Yersin worked as the gunpowder superintendent for French-speaking Switzerland, based in La Vaux, in the Aubonne valley, and also a professor of natural sciences at the colleges of Aubonne and Morges and was passionate about studying insects. His entomological interests included earwigs and grasshoppers. The grasshopper genus Yersinella was so named in his honour in 1860.

Yersin had three children with his wife, Fanny Isaline Emilie Moschell. He died of a cerebral hemmorrhage three weeks before the birth of his youngest son Alexandre Emile Jean Yersin, who became famous for discovering the causative agent of the plague, the bacterium Yersinia pestis. His renowned son developed his interest in biology at the age of eight, after finding his father's collection of insects. This collection is now conserved in the Naturhistorisches Museum Wien (Vienna) and in the Natural History Museum of Geneva.

== Publications ==
His publications include Sur quelques Orthoptères nouveaux ou peu connus du midi de la France Bull. Soc. vaud. Hist. nat., 8 p., 1 plate (1854) and Note sur quelques Orthoptères nouveaux ou peu connus d'Europes Ann. Soc. ent. Fr., pp. 509–537, pl. 10 (1860).
