= Hayk Mirzayans =

Iranian Armenian entomologist (1920–1999)

- Born: 1920; Qazvin, Sublime State of Iran
- Died: 2 April 1999 (aged 78–79)
- Education: University of Tehran
- Scientific career
- Fields: entomology
- Workplaces: Insect Taxonomy Research Department

Hayk Mirzayans (Persian: هایک میرزایانس; Armenian: Հայկ Միրզաեանս; 1920 – 2 April 1999) was an Iranian Armenian entomologist.

== Biography ==
He was born in Qazvin, Iran, to an Armenian family. He completed his primary and high school education in Qazvin and Tehran, and graduated from University of Tehran's Faculty of Agriculture in 1945, upon which he was hired by the Ministry of Agriculture.

Together with a few fellow graduate students and with the aid of Russian entomologists Drs. Alexandrov, Chovachin and Kiriokhin, Mirzayans founded the Entomology and Plant Pathology Research Department, which later (in 1962) became the Plant Pests and Diseases Research Institute. Despite logistic and budgetary restrictions at the time, Mirzayans managed to conduct several expeditions across the country, and his collection of insects from 1945 became the first specimens to be deposited in the departmental collection, which would later become the largest insect collection in Iran and named in his honour, the Hayk Mirzayans Insect Museum (HMIM).

Mirzayans' knowledge of several languages (including Russian, French and English), communication skills and perseverance led to scientific collaborations and exchanges with many entomologists and entomological institutions around the world and resulted in growth of the insect collection and creation of an entomological library. Mirzayans was also one of the founding members of the Entomological Society of Iran (ESI) in 1965, and an active participant in the society's activities throughout his life, serving as a member of board of directors and the editor of the Journal of Entomological Society of Iran (JESI) for many years.

Mirzayans specialized in taxonomy of Orthoptera of the Palaearctic region but had a keen interest in several other groups including Hemiptera (Auchenorrhyncha). He retired in 1979 but continued to work in his office in the Insect Taxonomy Research Department until the end of his life. During over 53 years of work, he trained many young entomologists, published many books and papers and described several new genera and species of insects for Iran. Several plant and insect species have been named in his honour.

== Major publications ==
- 1998. Insects of Iran. The list of Orthoptera in the insect collection of Plant Pests & Diseases Research Institute. Orthoptera (10): Pamphagidae (8) and Pyrgomorphidae (10). 40 pp. Plant Pests & Diseases Research Institute, Tehran.
- 1995. Insects of Iran. The list of Homoptera: Auchenorrhyncha in the insect collection of Plant Pests & Diseases Research Institute. 59 pp. Plant Pests & Diseases Research Institute, Tehran.
- 1991. Three n. genera & four n. species of Orthoptera from Iran. - Journal of Entomological Society of Iran, Supplement 6: 1-26.
- 1990. A harmful bush-cricket from Gorgan area Decorana capitata (Uv.) (Tettigoniidae: Decticinae). - Journal of Entomological Society of Iran, 10(1-2): 37-42.
- 1989 (with G. Radjabi). First report of Zyginella pulchra Low. as a harmful insect on deciduous fruit trees in Iran. - Entomologie et Phytopathologie Appliquees, 56(1-2): 101-103, 29.
- 1986. Fauna of Iranian cockroaches (Orthopteroidea: Blattaria). - Journal of Entomological Society of Iran, Supplement 4: 1-145.
- 1976. List of Auchenorrhyncha (Homoptera) from Province of Fars (1). - Journal of Entomological Society of Iran, 3(1-2): 110-112.
- 1974 (with M.E. Abai). The oak trees Lepidoptera in Iran. - Journal of Entomological Society of Iran, 1(2): 161-167.
- 1970 (with Gh. Kalali). Contribution a la connaissance de la faune des lepidopteres de l'Iran (2). - Entomologie et Phytopathologie Appliquees, 29: 15-23, 50.
- 1970. Contribution a la connaissance de la faune des derides et Meloides de l'Iran. - Entomologie et Phytopathologie Appliquees, 29: 25-37, 59.
- 1969 (with E. Morales Agacino). Sur une nouvelle espece du genre Nephoptera Uvarov. 1929 (Orthoptera: Tethigonioidea). - Entomologie et Phytopathologie Appliquees, 28: 25-28,28-31.

== Taxa named in honour of Hayk Mirzayans ==
- Laemostenus (Antisphodrus) mirzayani (Morvan, 1973) (Coleoptera: Carabidae)
- Peryphus mirzayani Morvan, 1973 (Coleoptera: Carabidae)
- Pristonychus mirzayani Morvan, 1974 (Coleoptera: Carabidae)
- Psammodromius mirzayani Morvan, 1977 (Coleoptera: Carabidae)
- Trechus mirzayani Morvan, 1974 (Coleoptera: Carabidae)
- Tituboea mirzayani (Lopatin, 1985) (Coleoptera: Chrysomelidae)
- Calydus mirzayani Kaszab, 1968 (Coleoptera: Meloidae)
- Mylabris (Argabris) laticollis ab. mirzayani Kaszab, 1968 (Coleoptera: Meloidae)
- Phalangonyx mirzayani (Petrovitz, 1968) (Coleoptera: Melolonthidae)
- Maladera (Eusericula) mirzayansi Montreuil & Keith, 2009 (Coleoptera: Scarabaeidae)
- Tanyproctus mirzayani Petrovitz, 1968 (Coleoptera: Scarabaeidae)
- Cicadatra mirzayansi Dlabola, 1981 (Hemiptera: Cicadidae)
- Spilococcus mirzayansi (Moghaddam, 2010) (Hemiptera: Coccoidea: Pseudococcidae)
- Chalcopis mirzayansi Hoberlandt & Safavi, 1981 (Heteroptera: Pentatomidae)
- Phragmatobia placida mirzayansi Dubatolov, Vladimir & Zahiri, 2005 (Lepidoptera: Arctiidae)
- Trichiura mirzayani Ebert, 1971 (Lepidoptera: Lasiocampidae)
- Euapatura mirza Ebert, 1971 (Lepidoptera: Nymphalidae)
- Limenitis reducta mirzayani Gross & Ebert, 1975 (Lepidoptera: Nymphalidae)
- Zygaena mirzayansi Hofmann & Keil, 2010 (Lepidoptera: Zygaenidae)
- Khayyamia [Iraniobia] mirzayani (Popov, 1951) (Orthoptera: Acrididae)
- Eupholidoptera mirzayani Mofidi-Neyestanak & Quicke, 2007 (Orthoptera: Tettigoniidae)
- Lithodusa mirzayani Unal, 2012 (Orthoptera: Tettigoniidae)
