= Cryptotrogus borumandi =

Scientific classification
- Kingdom: Animalia
- Phylum: Arthropoda
- Clade: Pancrustacea
- Class: Insecta
- Order: Coleoptera
- Suborder: Polyphaga
- Infraorder: Scarabaeiformia
- Family: Scarabaeidae
- Tribe: Melolonthini
- Genus: Cryptotrogus
- Species: C. borumandi

Binomial name
- Cryptotrogus borumandi Montreuil & Keith, 2017

Species of beetle

Cryptotrogus borumandi is a species of beetle of the family Scarabaeidae. It is found in Iran.

== Description ==
Adults reach a length of about 15–17 mm (0.59–0.67 in). They are brownish-yellow, with the disc of the pronotum, scutellum, cephalic capsule and large posterior part of the clypeus darkened, while the antennae are yellowish.

== Etymology ==
The species is dedicated to Houshang Borumand, curator of the Coleoptera collections at the Hayk Mirzayans Insect Museum (HMIM) from 1972 to 1998.
