= Cryptotrogus mirzayansi =

Scientific classification
- Kingdom: Animalia
- Phylum: Arthropoda
- Clade: Pancrustacea
- Class: Insecta
- Order: Coleoptera
- Suborder: Polyphaga
- Infraorder: Scarabaeiformia
- Family: Scarabaeidae
- Tribe: Melolonthini
- Genus: Cryptotrogus
- Species: C. mirzayansi

Binomial name
- Cryptotrogus mirzayansi Montreuil & Keith, 2017

Species of beetle

Cryptotrogus mirzayansi is a species of beetle of the family Scarabaeidae. It is found in Iran.

== Description ==
Adults reach a length of about 14–18 mm (0.55–0.71 in). They are light reddish-brown to dark reddish-brown, with the disc of the pronotum, scutellum and cephalic capsule darker and the antennae yellowish.

== Etymology ==
The species is dedicated to the Iranian entomologist Hayk Mirzayans.
