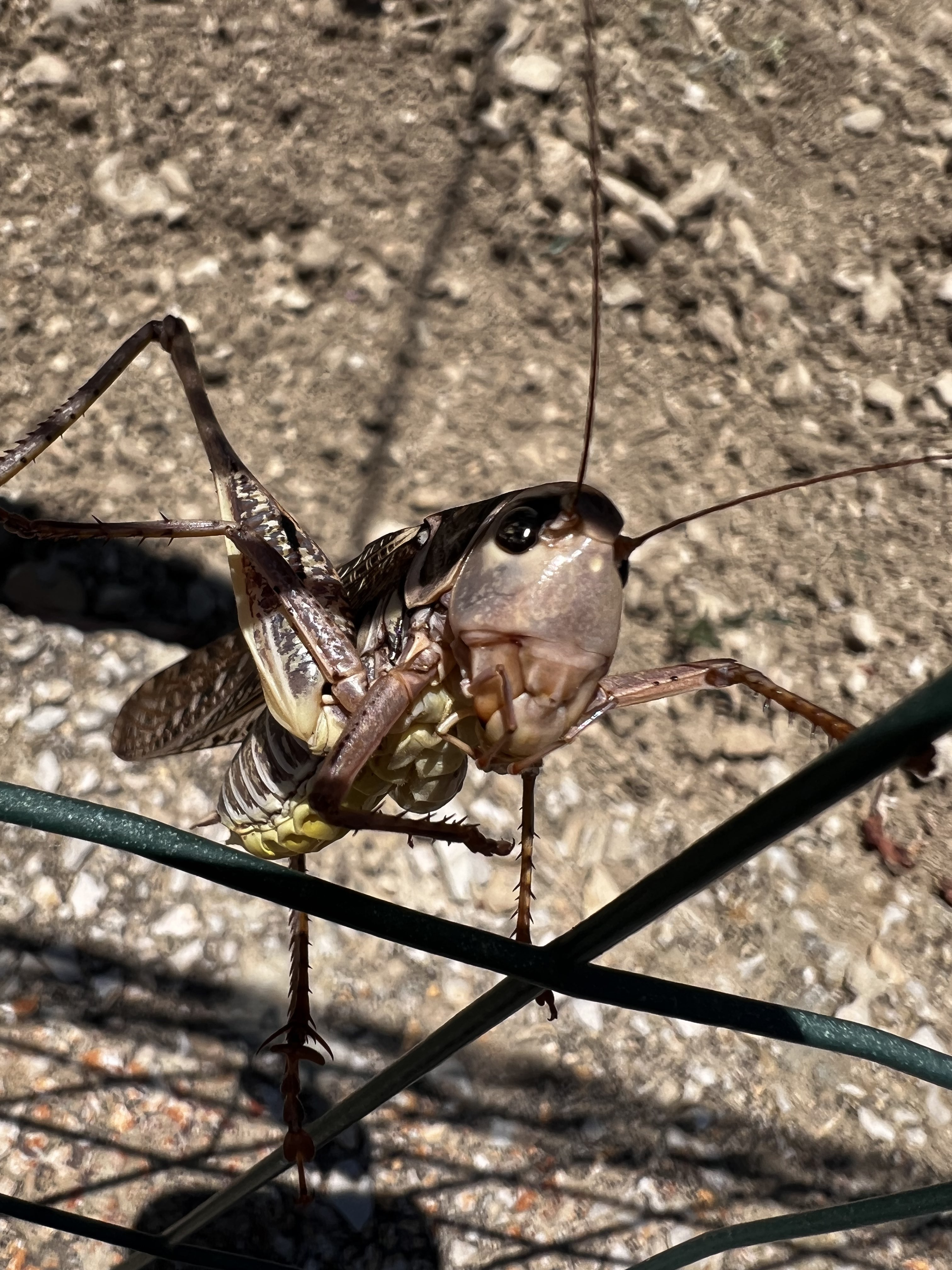
- Greek marbled bush-cricket in Kos, Greece

Scientific classification
- Kingdom: Animalia
- Phylum: Arthropoda
- Class: Insecta
- Order: Orthoptera
- Suborder: Ensifera
- Family: Tettigoniidae
- Genus: Eupholidoptera
- Species: E. megastyla

Binomial name
- Eupholidoptera megastyla (Ramme, 1939)

= Eupholidoptera megastyla =

Species of cricket-like animal

Eupholidoptera megastyla, the Greek marbled bush-cricket, is a species of bush crickets belonging to the tribe Pholidopterini.

== Distribution and habitat ==
The Greek marbled bush-cricket is endemic to Greece, where it is widespread across the mainland including the Peloponnesus, Ionian and western Aegean islands. They can be encountered in and around bushes and shrubs, from sea level up to high altitudes in the mountains.

== Diet and feeding habits ==
Eupholidoptera megastyla has been observed to consume fruit, specifically overripe mulberries. This dietary preference aligns with the general eating habits of katydids, which are omnivorous and versatile feeders. They consume a variety of food sources, such as leaves, fruits, seeds, floral components, carrion, and live prey. Their diet may also include insect eggs and embryos of certain terrestrial frogs.
