= Cryptotrogus morgani =

Scientific classification
- Kingdom: Animalia
- Phylum: Arthropoda
- Clade: Pancrustacea
- Class: Insecta
- Order: Coleoptera
- Suborder: Polyphaga
- Infraorder: Scarabaeiformia
- Family: Scarabaeidae
- Tribe: Melolonthini
- Genus: Cryptotrogus
- Species: C. morgani

Binomial name
- Cryptotrogus morgani Montreuil & Keith, 2017

Species of beetle

Cryptotrogus morgani is a species of beetle of the family Scarabaeidae. It is found in Iran.

== Description ==
Adults reach a length of about 19–25 mm (0.75–0.98 in). The clypeus, pronotal disc and cephalic capsule are darkened, becoming brownish-yellow to light reddish-brown.

== Etymology ==
The species is named in honour of French explorer and archaeologist Jacques de Morgan, who first collected the species.
