= Cryptotrogus =

Scientific classification
- Kingdom: Animalia
- Phylum: Arthropoda
- Clade: Pancrustacea
- Class: Insecta
- Order: Coleoptera
- Suborder: Polyphaga
- Infraorder: Scarabaeiformia
- Family: Scarabaeidae
- Subfamily: Melolonthinae
- Tribe: Melolonthini
- Genus: Cryptotrogus; Kraatz, 1888

Synonyms
- Meganoxia Reitter, 1902; Cyphonoxia Reitter, 1889

Genus of leaf beetles

Cryptotrogus is a genus of beetles belonging to the family Scarabaeidae.

== Species ==
- Cryptotrogus afghanus Balthasar, 1955
- Cryptotrogus borumandi Montreuil & Keith, 2017
- Cryptotrogus brenskei (Reitter, 1895)
- Cryptotrogus buettikeri (Sabatinelli & Pontuale, 1998)
- Cryptotrogus ebrahimii Montreuil & Keith, 2017
- Cryptotrogus gallagheri Sabatinelli & Pontuale, 1998
- Cryptotrogus haarlovi (Petrovitz, 1955)
- Cryptotrogus indianus (Blanchard, 1851)
- Cryptotrogus irakanus Montreuil & Keith, 2017
- Cryptotrogus kircheri (Balthasar, 1930)
- Cryptotrogus kruppi Sabatinelli & Pontuale, 1998
- Cryptotrogus maluzhenkoi (Zaitzev, 1928)
- Cryptotrogus mesopotamicus (Petrovitz, 1962)
- Cryptotrogus miesseni Montreuil & Keith, 2017
- Cryptotrogus mirzayansi Montreuil & Keith, 2017
- Cryptotrogus monodi Montreuil & Keith, 2017
- Cryptotrogus morgani Montreuil & Keith, 2017
- Cryptotrogus niveus (Hampe, 1852)
- Cryptotrogus pajnii Mittal, 1979
- Cryptotrogus parallelus Montreuil & Keith, 2017
- Cryptotrogus praestabilis (Reitter, 1889)
- Cryptotrogus sindh Montreuil, Keith & Sabatinelli, 2019
- Cryptotrogus tatianae (Semenov-Tian-Shanskii & Medvedev, 1936)
- Cryptotrogus weisei Kraatz, 1888
- Cryptotrogus zarudnianus (Semenov-Tian-Shanskii & Medvedev, 1936)
- Cryptotrogus zarudnyi (Semenov-Tian-Shanskii & Medvedev, 1936)
