= Cryptotrogus miesseni =

Scientific classification
- Kingdom: Animalia
- Phylum: Arthropoda
- Clade: Pancrustacea
- Class: Insecta
- Order: Coleoptera
- Suborder: Polyphaga
- Infraorder: Scarabaeiformia
- Family: Scarabaeidae
- Tribe: Melolonthini
- Genus: Cryptotrogus
- Species: C. miesseni

Binomial name
- Cryptotrogus miesseni Montreuil & Keith, 2017

Species of beetle

Cryptotrogus miesseni is a species of beetle of the family Scarabaeidae. It is found in Iran.

== Description ==
Adults reach a length of about 18.5–20 mm (0.73–0.79 in). They are reddish-brown, with a darker head and reddish-brown or yellowish-brown elytra.

== Etymology ==
The species is named in honour of G. Miessen, a specialist in Palearctic Scarabaeoidea.
