= Cryptotrogus parallelus =

Scientific classification
- Kingdom: Animalia
- Phylum: Arthropoda
- Clade: Pancrustacea
- Class: Insecta
- Order: Coleoptera
- Suborder: Polyphaga
- Infraorder: Scarabaeiformia
- Family: Scarabaeidae
- Tribe: Melolonthini
- Genus: Cryptotrogus
- Species: C. parallelus

Binomial name
- Cryptotrogus parallelus Montreuil & Keith, 2017

Species of beetle

Cryptotrogus parallelus is a species of beetle of the family Scarabaeidae. It is found in Iran.

== Description ==
Adults reach a length of about 21–25 mm (0.83–0.98 in). They are reddish-brown, with lighter elytra and antennae, a dark reddish-brown pronotum and scutellum, and a mostly yellowish-brown abdomen, as well as a blackish-brown cephalic capsule.

== Etymology ==
The species name refers to its elongated body, with parallel sides.
