= Cryptotrogus irakanus =

Scientific classification
- Kingdom: Animalia
- Phylum: Arthropoda
- Clade: Pancrustacea
- Class: Insecta
- Order: Coleoptera
- Suborder: Polyphaga
- Infraorder: Scarabaeiformia
- Family: Scarabaeidae
- Tribe: Melolonthini
- Genus: Cryptotrogus
- Species: C. irakanus

Binomial name
- Cryptotrogus irakanus Montreuil & Keith, 2017

Species of beetle

Cryptotrogus irakanus is a species of beetle of the family Scarabaeidae. It is found in Iraq.

== Description ==
Adults reach a length of about 17 mm (0.67 in). They are brownish-yellow, with the head and pronotum light brownish-red.
