= Cryptotrogus ebrahimii =

Scientific classification
- Kingdom: Animalia
- Phylum: Arthropoda
- Clade: Pancrustacea
- Class: Insecta
- Order: Coleoptera
- Suborder: Polyphaga
- Infraorder: Scarabaeiformia
- Family: Scarabaeidae
- Tribe: Melolonthini
- Genus: Cryptotrogus
- Species: C. ebrahimii

Binomial name
- Cryptotrogus ebrahimii Montreuil & Keith, 2017

Species of beetle

Cryptotrogus ebrahimii is a species of beetle of the family Scarabaeidae. It is found in Iran and Pakistan.

== Description ==
Adults reach a length of about 16–21 mm (0.63–0.83 in). They are reddish-brown, with the elytra and antennal club yellowish-brown.

== Etymology ==
The species is named in honour of Hymenoptera specialist E. Ebrahimi, one of its collectors.
