= Cryptotrogus monodi =

Scientific classification
- Kingdom: Animalia
- Phylum: Arthropoda
- Clade: Pancrustacea
- Class: Insecta
- Order: Coleoptera
- Suborder: Polyphaga
- Infraorder: Scarabaeiformia
- Family: Scarabaeidae
- Tribe: Melolonthini
- Genus: Cryptotrogus
- Species: C. monodi

Binomial name
- Cryptotrogus monodi Montreuil & Keith, 2017

Species of beetle

Cryptotrogus monodi is a species of beetle of the family Scarabaeidae. It is found in Iran.

== Description ==
Adults reach a length of about 14–19 mm (0.55–0.75 in). They are reddish-brown, with a dark brown head.

== Etymology ==
The species is named in honour of the French naturalist and desert specialist Théodore Monod, who first collected the species.
