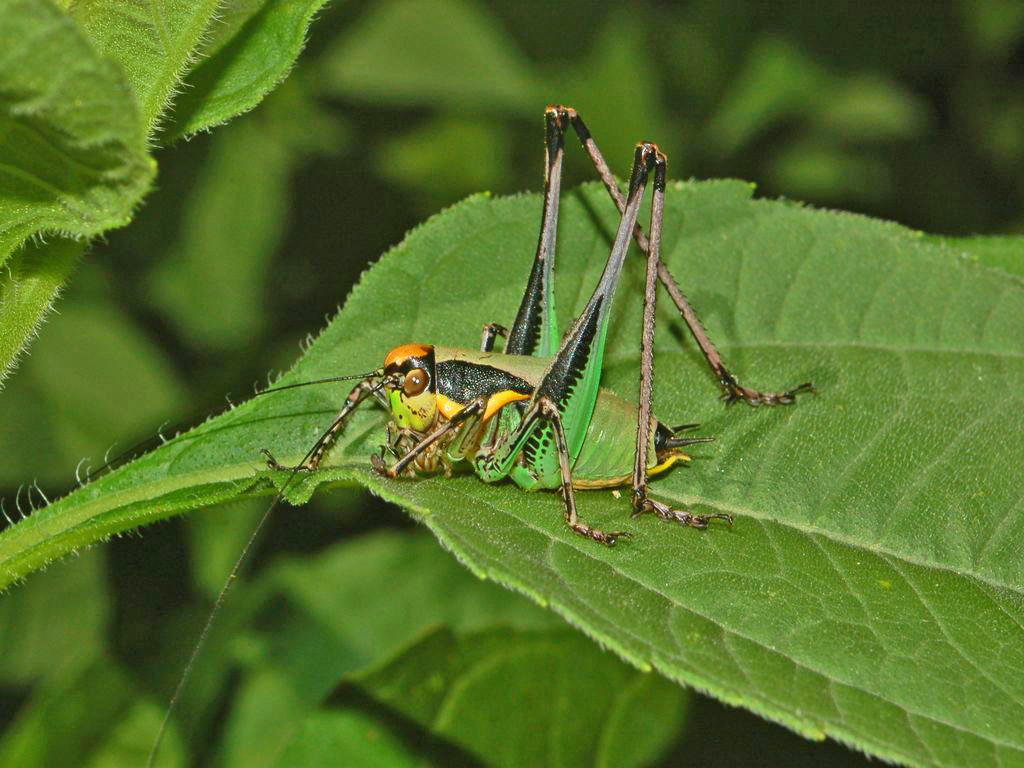
- Male
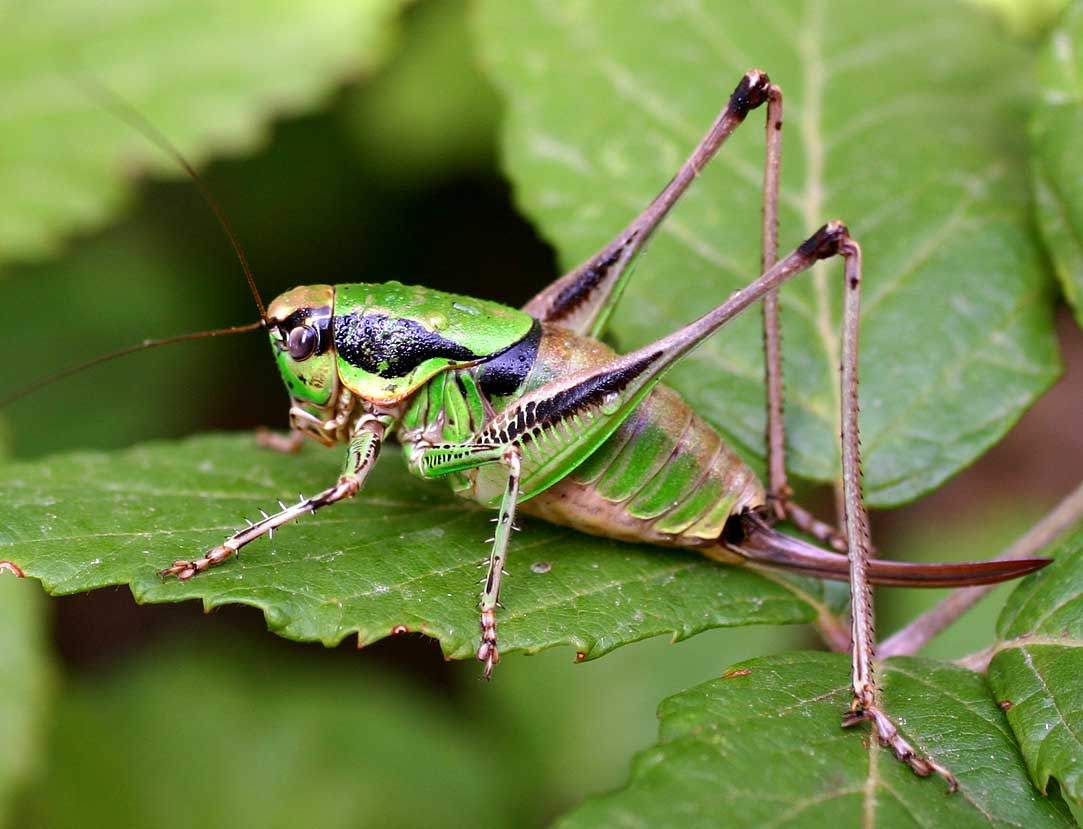
- Female

Scientific classification
- Kingdom: Animalia
- Phylum: Arthropoda
- Clade: Pancrustacea
- Class: Insecta
- Order: Orthoptera
- Suborder: Ensifera
- Family: Tettigoniidae
- Genus: Eupholidoptera
- Species: E. chabrieri

Binomial name
- Eupholidoptera chabrieri (Charpentier, 1825)

= Eupholidoptera chabrieri =

Species of cricket-like animal

Close-Up of a Eupholidoptera chabrieri

Eupholidoptera chabrieri is the type species of European bush crickets in the genus Eupholidoptera: belonging to the tribe Pholidopterini.

== Subspecies ==
The Orthoptera Species File lists

1. Eupholidoptera chabrieri brunneri (Targioni-Tozzetti, 1881)
2. Eupholidoptera chabrieri chabrieri (Charpentier, 1825) (type)
3. Eupholidoptera chabrieri galvagnii Adamovic, 1972
4. Eupholidoptera chabrieri usi Adamovic, 1972

== Distribution and habitat ==
These crickets are mainly present in France, southern Switzerland, Italy, Slovenia, Romania, Croatia and in Greece. They can be encountered in forest edges, clearings, thickets and shrubs.

== Description ==
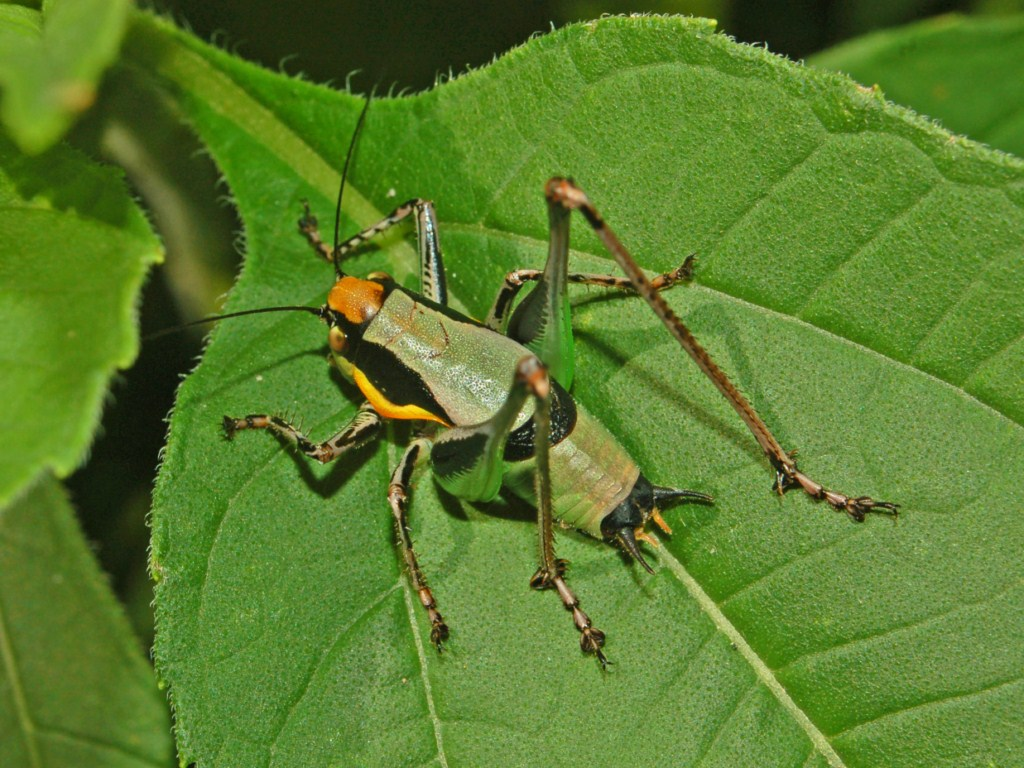
Eupholidoptera chabrieri. Male, dorsal view

The adults reach 20–30 millimetres (0.79–1.18 in) of length. The basic coloration of the body varies from green to light green and yellow green. The top of the head is orange, with a few black spots in the front.

The compound eyes are pale brown. The antennae are longer than the body. The flat, extended pronotum shows a black band, with an orange-yellow lateral contour. The abdomen is green and quite thick, with a yellow bottom and a black last segment. This species is remarkably long-legged, with a striking pattern of black spots and drawings and small spines on the hind legs.

In the females the tiny dark brown wings are partially hidden under the pronotum, while the males have very short tegmina. The females have a slightly curved ovipositor, which is somewhat shorter than the body.

== Biology ==
Adults can be found from July through September. This species start breeding in July. Only eggs overwinter, hatching in next April. The song of these crickets consists of short, high-frequency single sounds, usually presented in series at a distance of a few seconds.

== Gallery ==
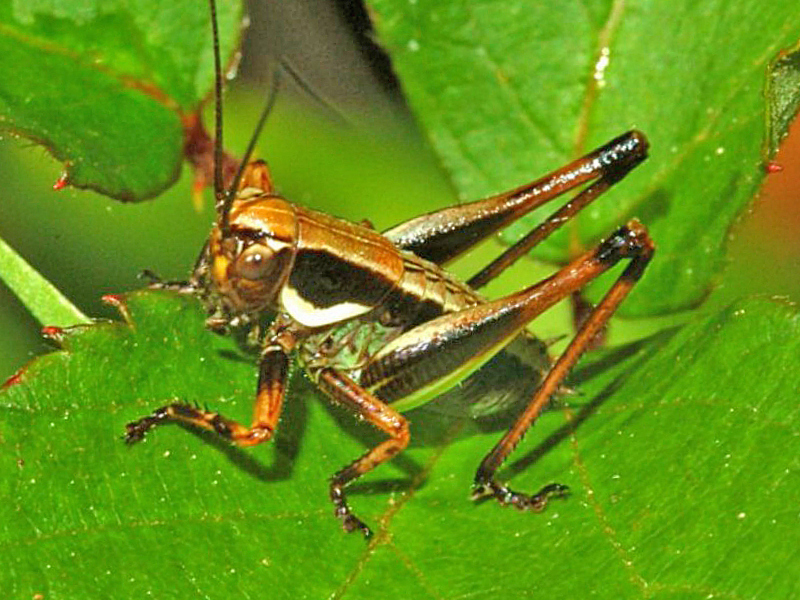
Young male

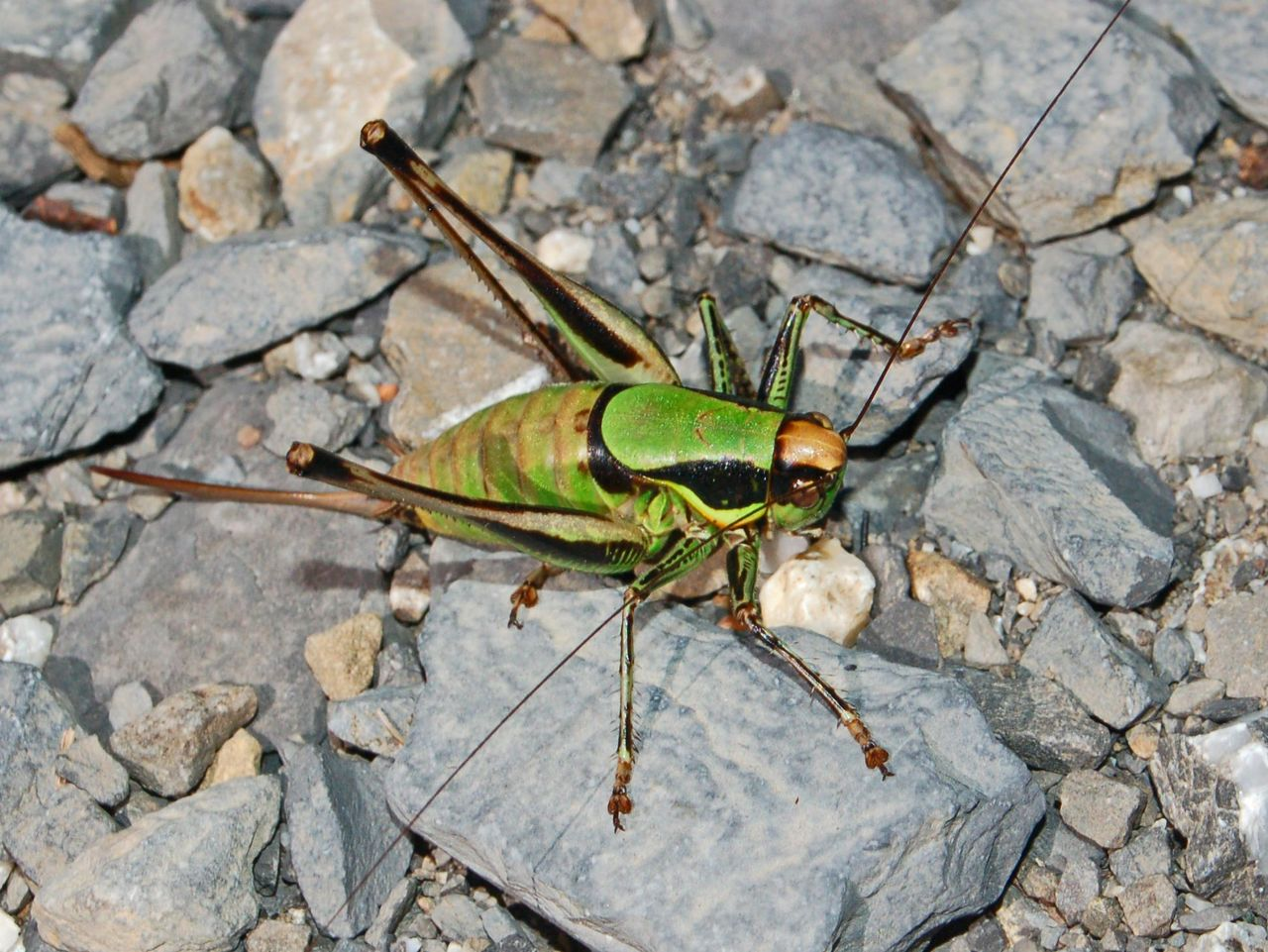
Female, dorsal view

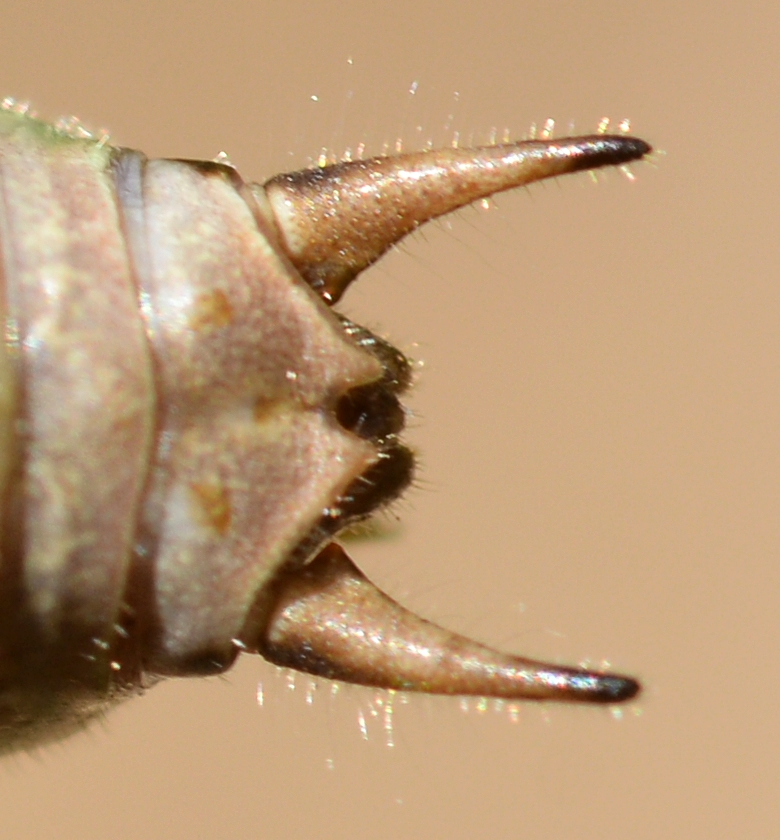
Male, detail on cerci

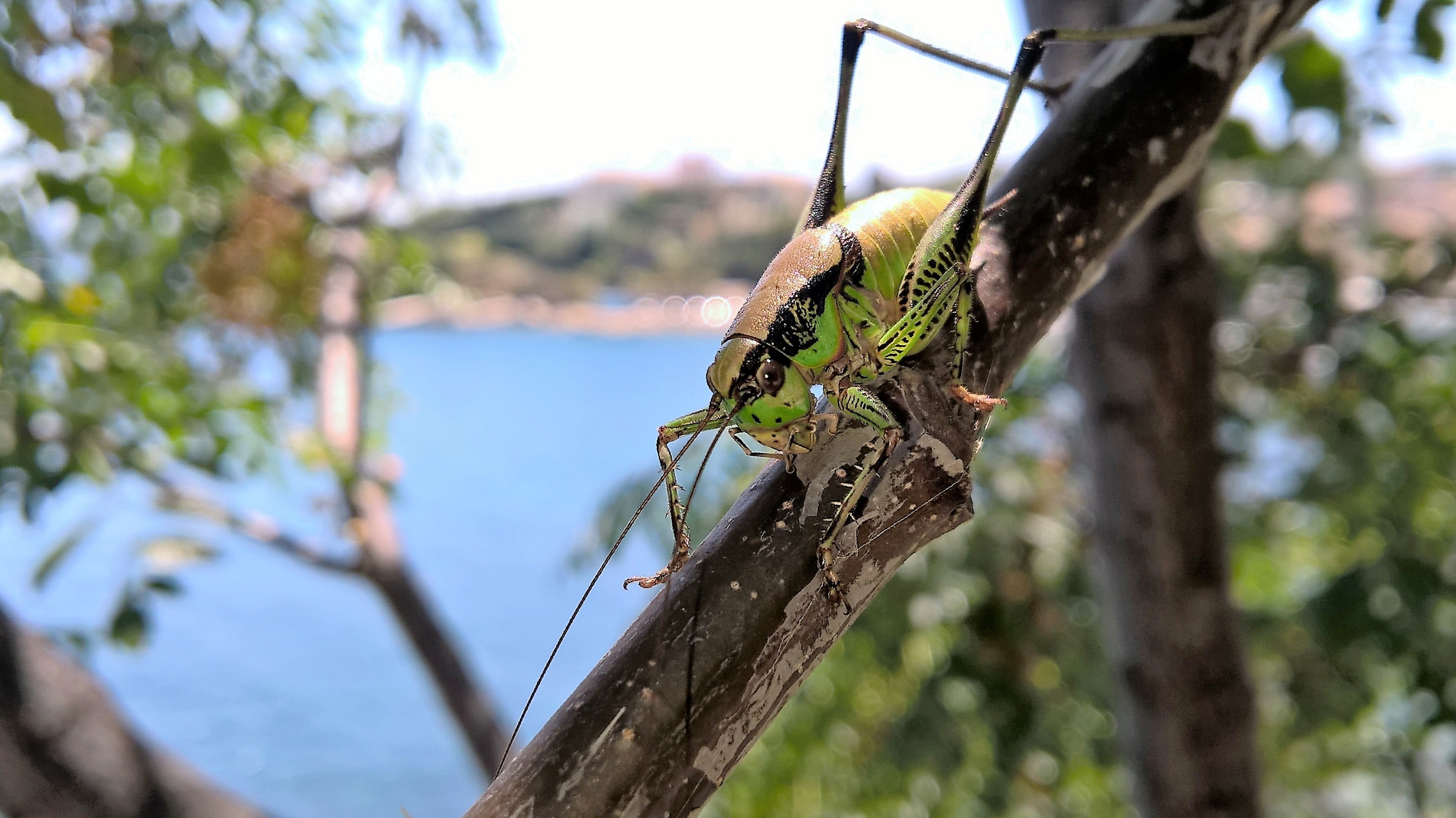
Eupholidoptera chabrieri (female). Kassiopi, Corfu, Greece
