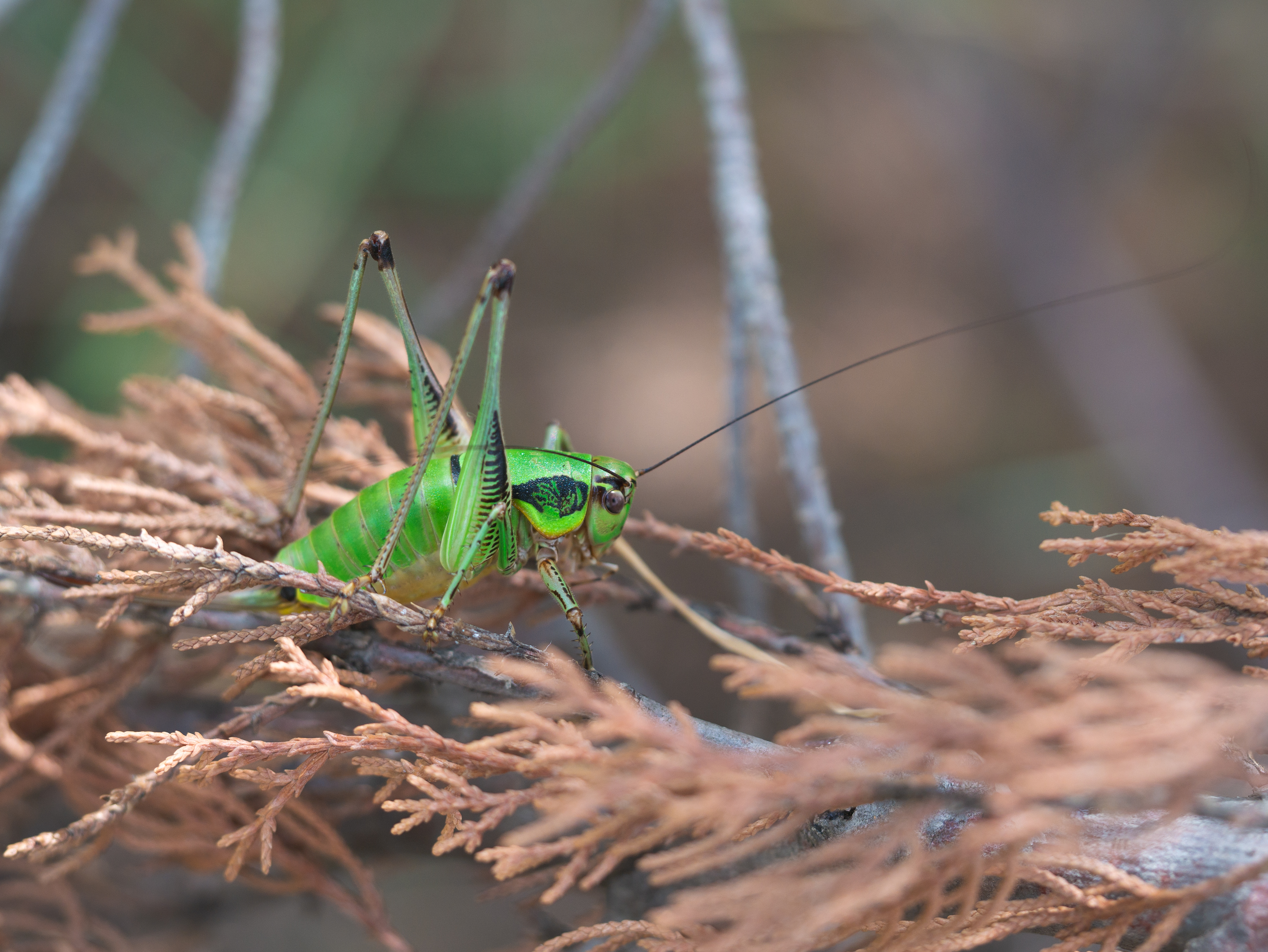

Scientific classification
- Kingdom: Animalia
- Phylum: Arthropoda
- Class: Insecta
- Order: Orthoptera
- Suborder: Ensifera
- Family: Tettigoniidae
- Genus: Eupholidoptera
- Species: E. leucasi

Binomial name
- Eupholidoptera leucasi Willemse, 1980

= Eupholidoptera leucasi =

Species of insect

Eupholidoptera leucasi is a species of katydid in the subfamily Tettigoniinae.

== Description ==
The species is morphologically and visually very similar to Eupholidoptera chabrieri and Eupholidoptera schmidtii, and can mostly be distinguished by location.

Their base color is usually a bright green. They can develop coloration on the back, top and leg parts that range from light orange-brownish to black.

== Range ==
The species is thought to be endemic to the island of Lefkada, Greece, but some observations have been reported from the areas surrounding Preveza, a nearby city. Lefkada is connected to the greek mainland via a floating bridge

== Etymology ==
The epitheton leucasi refers to Lefkada (or Leukas), the island the species has primarily been found in.
