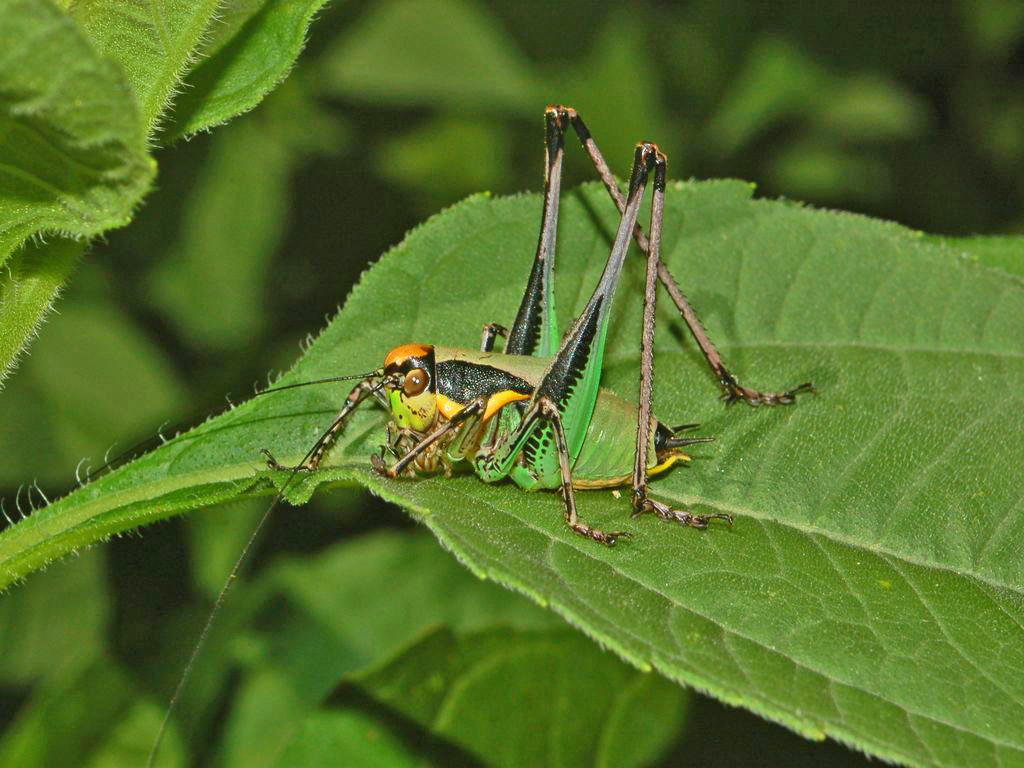
- Eupholidoptera chabrieri

Scientific classification
- Kingdom: Animalia
- Phylum: Arthropoda
- Class: Insecta
- Order: Orthoptera
- Suborder: Ensifera
- Family: Tettigoniidae
- Subfamily: Tettigoniinae
- Tribe: Pholidopterini
- Genus: Eupholidoptera; Maran, 1953

Synonyms
- Eupholidoptera Ramme, 1951; Uvarovistia (Karabagia) Harz, 1969; Pachytrachelurus Giglio-Tos, 1914

= Eupholidoptera =

Genus of cricket-like animals

Eupholidoptera is a genus of Palaearctic bush crickets belonging to the subfamily Tettigoniinae, erected by Josef Mařan in 1953.

== Distribution ==
Species belonging to this genus are present in mainland Europe (not the British Isles or Scandinavia) and in the Near East.

== Species ==
The Orthoptera Species File lists genera in two superspecies:

Superspecies chabrieri (Charpentier, 1825)

- subgroup annulipes (Brunner von Wattenwyl, 1882)
1. Eupholidoptera annulipes (Brunner von Wattenwyl, 1882)
2. Eupholidoptera marashensis Salman, 1983
- subgroup megastyla (Ramme, 1939)
1. Eupholidoptera bimucronata (Ramme, 1927)
2. Eupholidoptera cephalonica Willemse & Willemse, 2004
3. Eupholidoptera chabrieri (Charpentier, 1825) - type species
4. Eupholidoptera danconai La Greca, 1959
5. Eupholidoptera epirotica (Ramme, 1927)
6. Eupholidoptera garganica La Greca, 1959
7. Eupholidoptera hesperica La Greca, 1959
8. Eupholidoptera leucasi Willemse, 1980
9. Eupholidoptera magnifica (Costa, 1863)
10. Eupholidoptera megastyla (Ramme, 1939)
11. Eupholidoptera schmidti (Fieber, 1861)
12. Eupholidoptera tyrrhenica Allegrucci, Massa, Trasatti & Sbordoni, 2014
- subgroup peneri Kaltenbach, 1969
1. Eupholidoptera gemellata Willemse & Kruseman, 1976
2. Eupholidoptera pallipes Willemse & Kruseman, 1976
3. Eupholidoptera peneri Kaltenbach, 1969
- subgroup smyrnensis (Brunner von Wattenwyl, 1882)
1. Eupholidoptera cypria Ramme, 1951
2. Eupholidoptera helina Çiplak, 2009
3. Eupholidoptera ledereri (Fieber, 1861)
4. Eupholidoptera lyra (Uvarov, 1942)
5. Eupholidoptera palaestinensis (Ramme, 1939)
6. Eupholidoptera smyrnensis (Brunner von Wattenwyl, 1882)
7. Eupholidoptera werneri Ramme, 1951
- subgroup uvarovi (Karabag, 1952)
1. Eupholidoptera akdeniz Ünal & Naskrecki, 2002
2. Eupholidoptera uvarovi (Karabag, 1952)
- not placed in a subgroup
1. Eupholidoptera stelae Willemse, Makris & Odé, 2025

Superspecies prasina (Brunner von Wattenwyl, 1882)

- subgroup anatolica (Ramme, 1930)
1. Eupholidoptera abscondita Ünal & Gorochov, 2024
2. Eupholidoptera anatolica (Ramme, 1930)
3. Eupholidoptera demirsoyi Salman, 1983
4. Eupholidoptera excisa (Karabag, 1952)
5. Eupholidoptera forcipata Willemse & Kruseman, 1976
6. Eupholidoptera icariensis Willemse, 1980
7. Eupholidoptera jacquelinae Tilmans, 2002
8. Eupholidoptera karabagi Salman, 1983
9. Eupholidoptera krueperi (Ramme, 1930)
10. Eupholidoptera kykladica Heller, Willemse & Willemse, 2009
11. Eupholidoptera mersinensis Salman, 1983
12. Eupholidoptera prasina (Brunner von Wattenwyl, 1882)
13. Eupholidoptera sevketi (Ramme, 1933)
14. Eupholidoptera spinigera (Ramme, 1930)
15. Eupholidoptera tahtalica (Uvarov, 1949)
16. Eupholidoptera tasheliensis Çiplak, 1999
17. Eupholidoptera tauricola (Ramme, 1930)
18. Eupholidoptera tucherti Harz, 1988
19. Eupholidoptera unimacula Karabag, 1956
- subgroup latens Willemse & Kruseman, 1976
1. Eupholidoptera annamariae Nadig, 1985
2. Eupholidoptera astyla (Ramme, 1927)
3. Eupholidoptera cretica Ramme, 1951
4. Eupholidoptera feri Koçak & Kemal, 2010
5. Eupholidoptera francisae Tilmans & Odé, 2023
6. Eupholidoptera giuliae Massa, 1999
7. Eupholidoptera latens Willemse & Kruseman, 1976
8. Eupholidoptera mariannae Willemse & Heller, 2001
9. Eupholidoptera marietheresae Willemse & Kotitsa, 2023
- not placed in a subgroup
1. Eupholidoptera kekrops Alexiou, 2024
2. Eupholidoptera singularis Ünal, 2018

Superspecies not determined

1. Eupholidoptera gocmeni Ünal, 2019
