= Psammodromius =

Scientific classification
- Domain: Eukaryota
- Kingdom: Animalia
- Phylum: Arthropoda
- Class: Insecta
- Order: Coleoptera
- Suborder: Adephaga
- Family: Carabidae
- Subfamily: Lebiinae
- Tribe: Lebiini
- Subtribe: Dromiusina
- Genus: Psammodromius; Peyerimhoff, 1927

Synonyms
- Xanthomelina Iablokoff-Khnzorian, 1964

Genus of beetles

Psammodromius is a genus of ground beetles in the family Carabidae. There are at least three described species in Psammodromius.

== Species ==
These three species belong to the genus Psammodromius:

- Psammodromius mirzayani Morvan, 1977 (Iran)
- Psammodromius noctivagus Peyerimhoff, 1927 (Egypt)
- Psammodromius zajtzewi (Eichler, 1924) (Southeast Europe and Southwest Asia)
