= Hayk Mirzayans Insect Museum =

Largest insect collection in Iran

Coordinates: 35°47′46.22″N 51°24′02.12″E

- موزه حشره‌شناسی هایک میرزایانس
- Established: 1945
- Location: Insect Taxonomy Research Department, Iranian Research Institute of Plant Protection, Evin, Tehran, Iran
- Type: Entomology
- Collection size: Over 4 million insect specimens, 20–25,000 species

The Hayk Mirzayans Insect Museum (HMIM) is the largest insect collection in Iran with over 4 million insect specimens, including 20–25,000 local species, hundreds of primary types and paratypes, and a representative collection of exotic insects, especially tropical butterflies.

== History ==
In 1943, Iranian entomologist JaIaI Afshar established a small entomology laboratory in the then Ministry of Agriculture in Tehran. Soon after, several Russian entomologists began collaborating with the lab. In 1945, a small group of fresh graduate students, including Hayk Mirzayans, joined the lab.

After the foundation of Plant Pests and Diseases Research Institute (PPDRI, now IRIPP, Iranian Research Institute of Plant Protection) in 1962, the lab was renamed to Laboratory of Entomology and Plant protection, and the insect collection became part of the Insect Taxonomy Research Department (ITRD) in the Institute’s main building.

After the Iranian Revolution in 1979, and with the retirement of a large group of researchers, the ITRD staff was reduced to only a few people, and the international collaborations were minimized. It took a decade before the department was fully re-staffed and research activities were resumed.

In the spring of 1999, after the death of Mirzayans, the collection was named the Hayk Mirzayans Insect Museum (HMIM).

== Research ==
Identification of insect fauna of Iran is the main objective of HMIM. The HMIM insect collection is spread over four main collection halls: Lepidoptera, Coleoptera, Orthoptera and Hymenoptera/Diptera.

Beside basic taxonomic research and collaborations, HMIM welcomes entomology students and research affiliates every year, advises the MSc, PhD students’ theses, offers training courses, and helps other scientific research centers in completion and maintenance of their insect collections. ITRD acts as the National Identification Service for governmental or non-governmental organizations, publishes various articles, reports, books, data banks and checklists of its holdings, and provides these information free of charge to all visitors.
