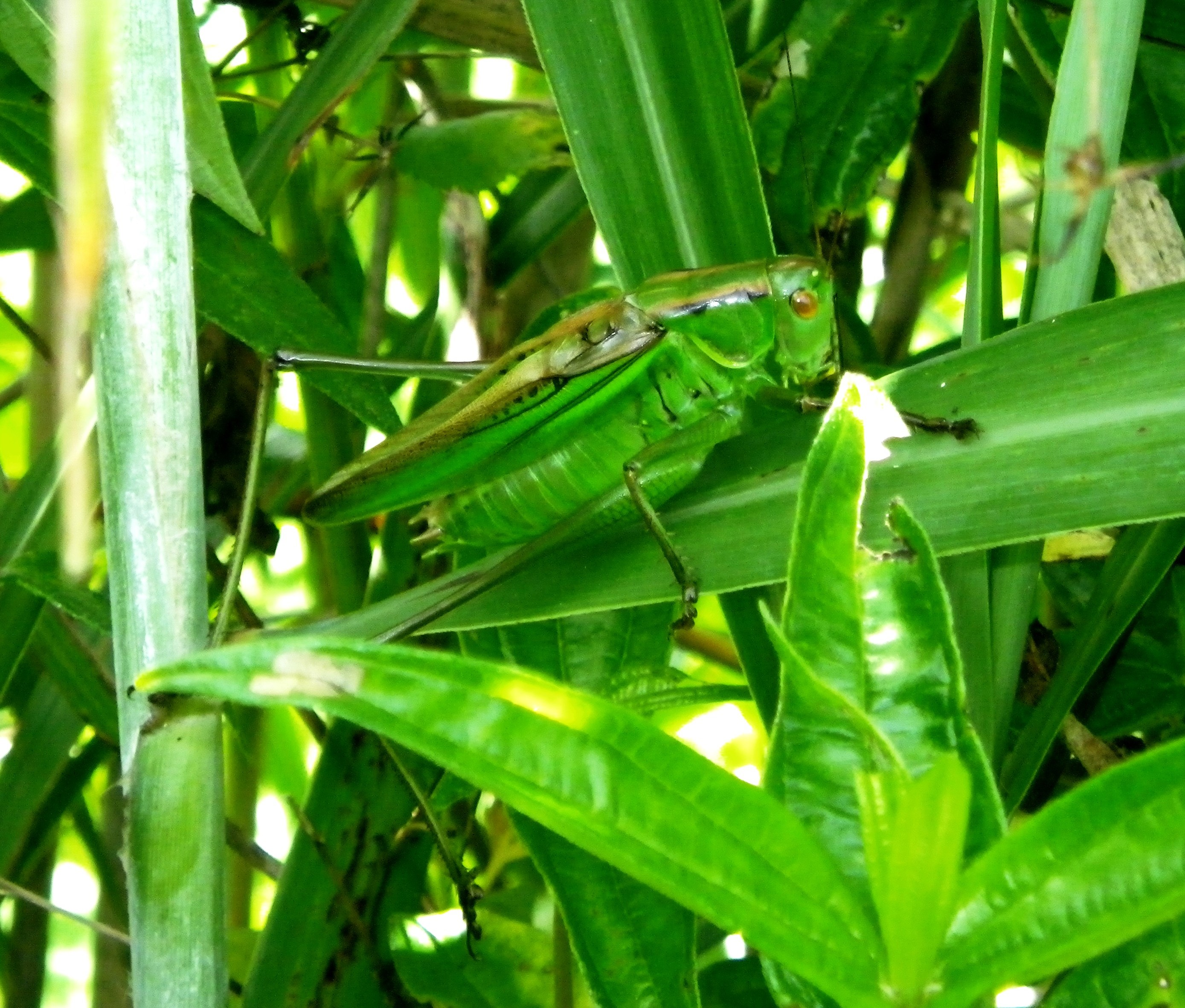

Scientific classification
- Domain: Eukaryota
- Kingdom: Animalia
- Phylum: Arthropoda
- Class: Insecta
- Order: Orthoptera
- Suborder: Ensifera
- Family: Tettigoniidae
- Genus: Gampsocleis
- Species: G. buergeri

Binomial name
- Gampsocleis buergeri Haan, 1843

Synonyms
- Decticus buergeri Haan, 1843; Gampsocleis mikado Burr, 1899; Gampsocleis mutsohito Burr, 1899

= Gampsocleis buergeri =

Species of insect

Gampsocleis buergeri is a species of bush-cricket in the family Tettigoniidae. It is found in Japan.
