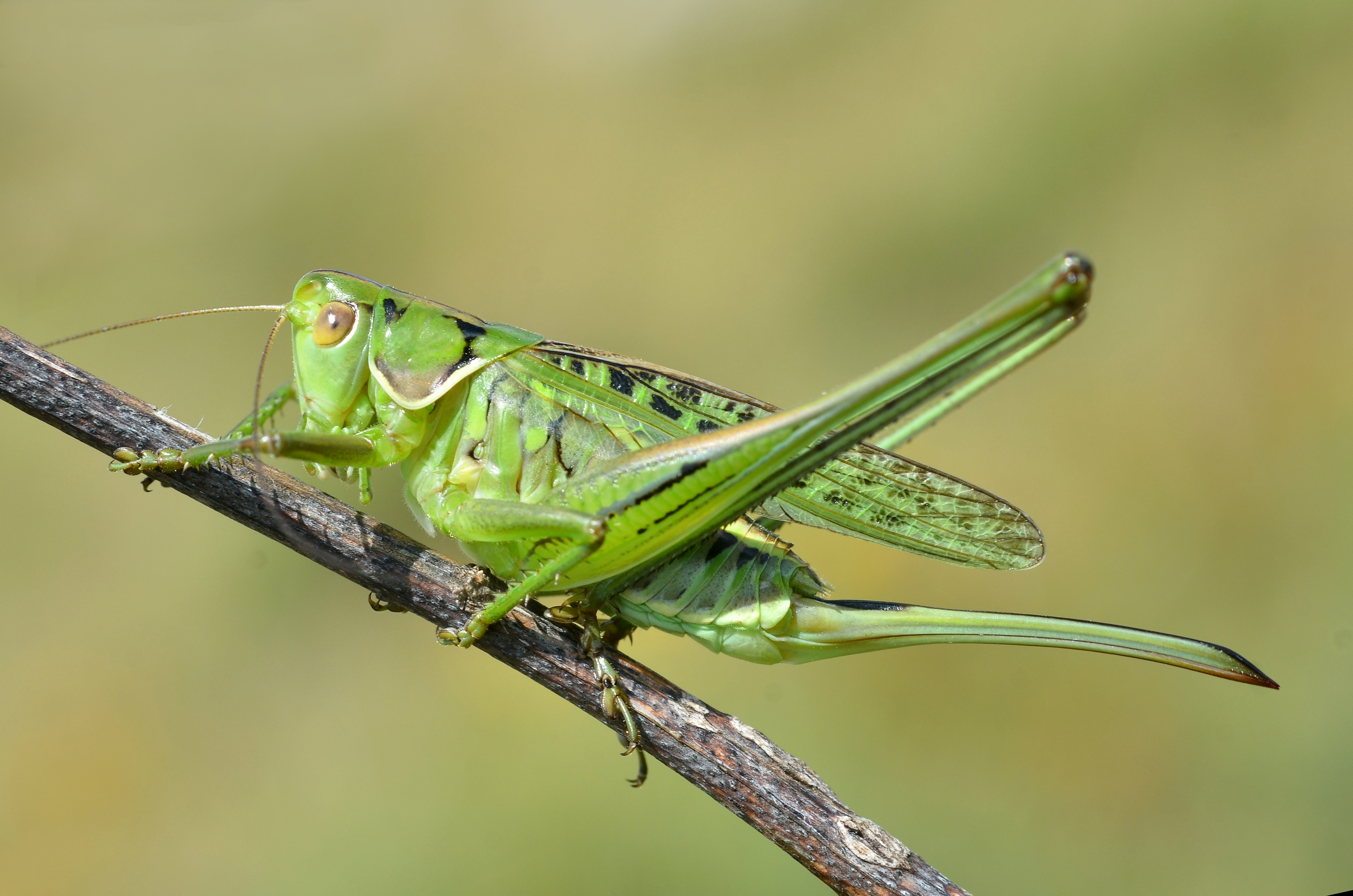
- Gampsocleis glabra female

Scientific classification
- Kingdom: Animalia
- Phylum: Arthropoda
- Class: Insecta
- Order: Orthoptera
- Suborder: Ensifera
- Family: Tettigoniidae
- Subfamily: Tettigoniinae
- Tribe: Gampsocleidini
- Genus: Gampsocleis; Fieber, 1852

Synonyms
- Gampsocleodes Tarbinsky, 1932

= Gampsocleis =

Genus of cricket-like animals

Gampsocleis is a genus of bush crickets in the subfamily Tettigoniinae and tribe Gampsocleidini.

== Distribution and biology ==
Species can be found in many parts of mainland Europe (but not the British Isles or Scandinavia), through central Asia to Korea and Japan. The type species, G. glabra, strongly resembles a smaller version of the wart-biter and this is reflected in common names given to the insect (e.g. dectique des brandes in French and kleine wrattenbijter in Dutch). As with many Orthoptera, species can be identified with song patterns.

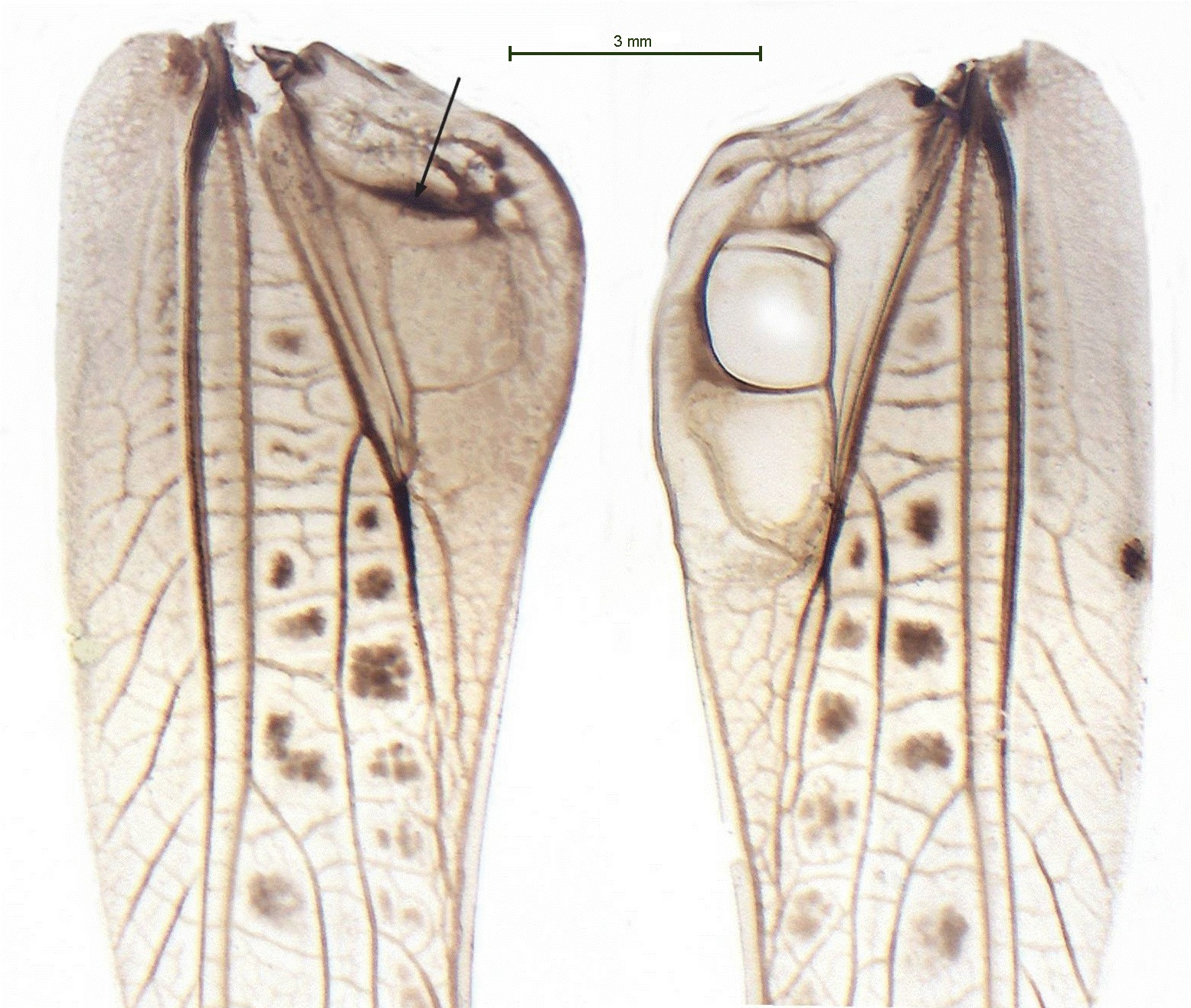
Stridulatory mechanism of G. glabra

Song of G. glabra

== Species ==
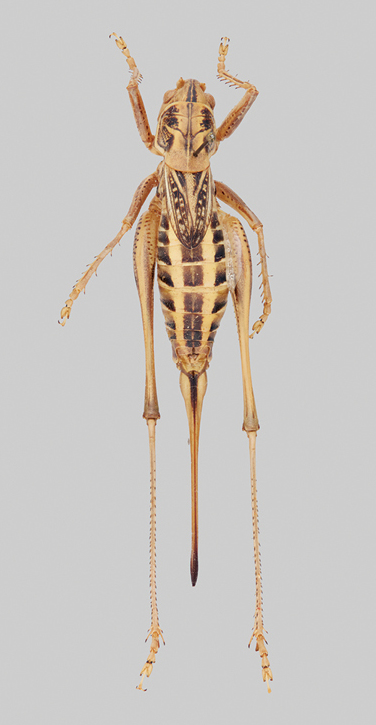
Gampsocleis acutipennis female

The Orthoptera Species File lists:

- Gampsocleis abbreviata Herman, 1874
- Gampsocleis acutipennis Karabag, 1956
- Gampsocleis akbari Panhwar, Sultana & Wagan, 2017
- Gampsocleis assoi Bolívar, 1900
- Gampsocleis beybienkoi Cejchan, 1968
- Gampsocleis buergeri Haan, 1842
- Gampsocleis carinata Bey-Bienko, 1951
- Gampsocleis glabra Herbst, 1786 - type species (as Locusta glabra Herbst)
- Gampsocleis gratiosa Brunner von Wattenwyl, 1862
- Gampsocleis infuscata Uvarov, 1924
- Gampsocleis mikado Burr, 1899
- Gampsocleis mongolica Dirsh, 1927
- Gampsocleis recticauda Werner, 1901
- Gampsocleis ryukyuensis Yamasaki, 1982
- Gampsocleis schelkovnikovae Adelung, 1916
- Gampsocleis sedakovii Fischer von Waldheim, 1846
- Gampsocleis sinensis Walker, 1869
- Gampsocleis ussuriensis Adelung, 1910
