= Gampsocleis sinensis =

Scientific classification
- Kingdom: Animalia
- Phylum: Arthropoda
- Class: Insecta
- Order: Orthoptera
- Suborder: Ensifera
- Family: Tettigoniidae
- Genus: Gampsocleis
- Species: G. sinensis

Binomial name
- Gampsocleis sinensis Walker, 1869

Species of insect

Gampsocleis sinensis is a species of bush cricket native to southern China.
