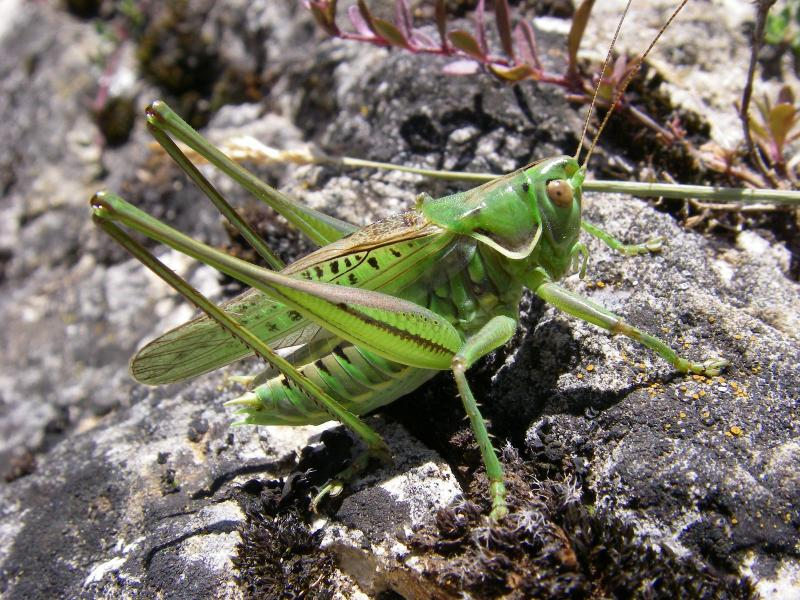
- Male: green morph
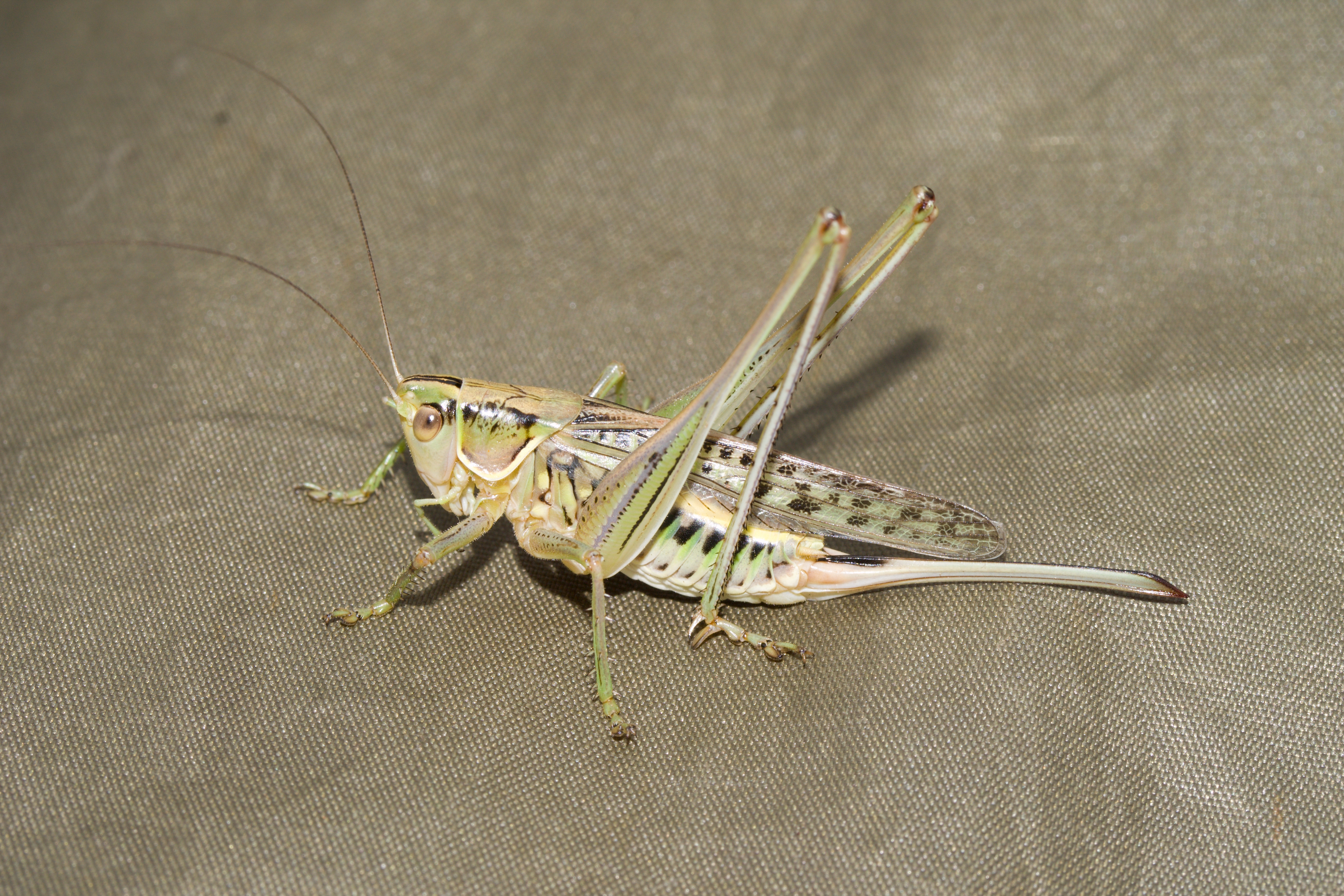
- Female

Scientific classification
- Domain: Eukaryota
- Kingdom: Animalia
- Phylum: Arthropoda
- Class: Insecta
- Order: Orthoptera
- Suborder: Ensifera
- Family: Tettigoniidae
- Subfamily: Tettigoniinae
- Tribe: Gampsocleidini
- Genus: Gampsocleis
- Species: G. glabra

Binomial name
- Gampsocleis glabra (Herbst, 1786)

= Gampsocleis glabra =

Species of cricket-like animal

Gampsocleis glabra is a species of bush crickets belonging to the subfamily Tettigoniinae. It is found over most of mainland Europe East to the Caspian and Black Sea.

== Biology ==
Gampsocleis glabra feeds on insects, sometimes grasses, heather and other plants in dry regions such as steppes, on nutrient-poor grasslands and in heathland with high grass cover.

Close-Up of a Gampsocleis glabra
