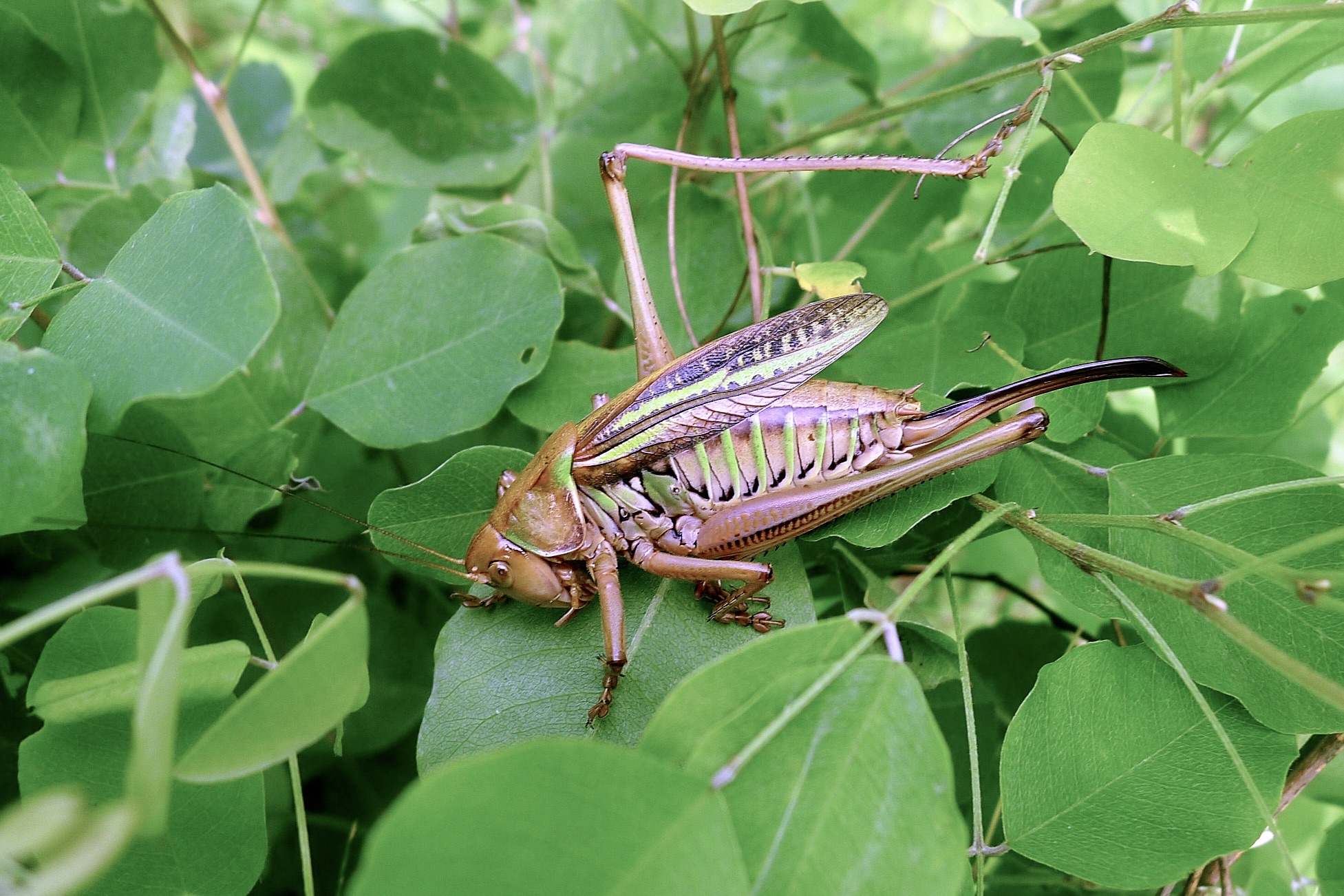

Scientific classification
- Kingdom: Animalia
- Phylum: Arthropoda
- Clade: Pancrustacea
- Class: Insecta
- Order: Orthoptera
- Suborder: Ensifera
- Family: Tettigoniidae
- Genus: Gampsocleis
- Species: G. sedakovii

Binomial name
- Gampsocleis sedakovii Fischer von Waldheim, 1846

= Gampsocleis sedakovii =

Species of insect

Gampsocleis sedakovii is a species of bush-crickets in the family Tettigoniidae.

Living Gampsocleis sedakovii in Japan

== Distribution ==
The species lives in Siberia, China, Mongolia, Korea, and Japan.

== Subspecies ==
This species has two subspecies:

- Gampsocleis sedakovii sedakovii
- Gampsocleis sedakovii obscura
