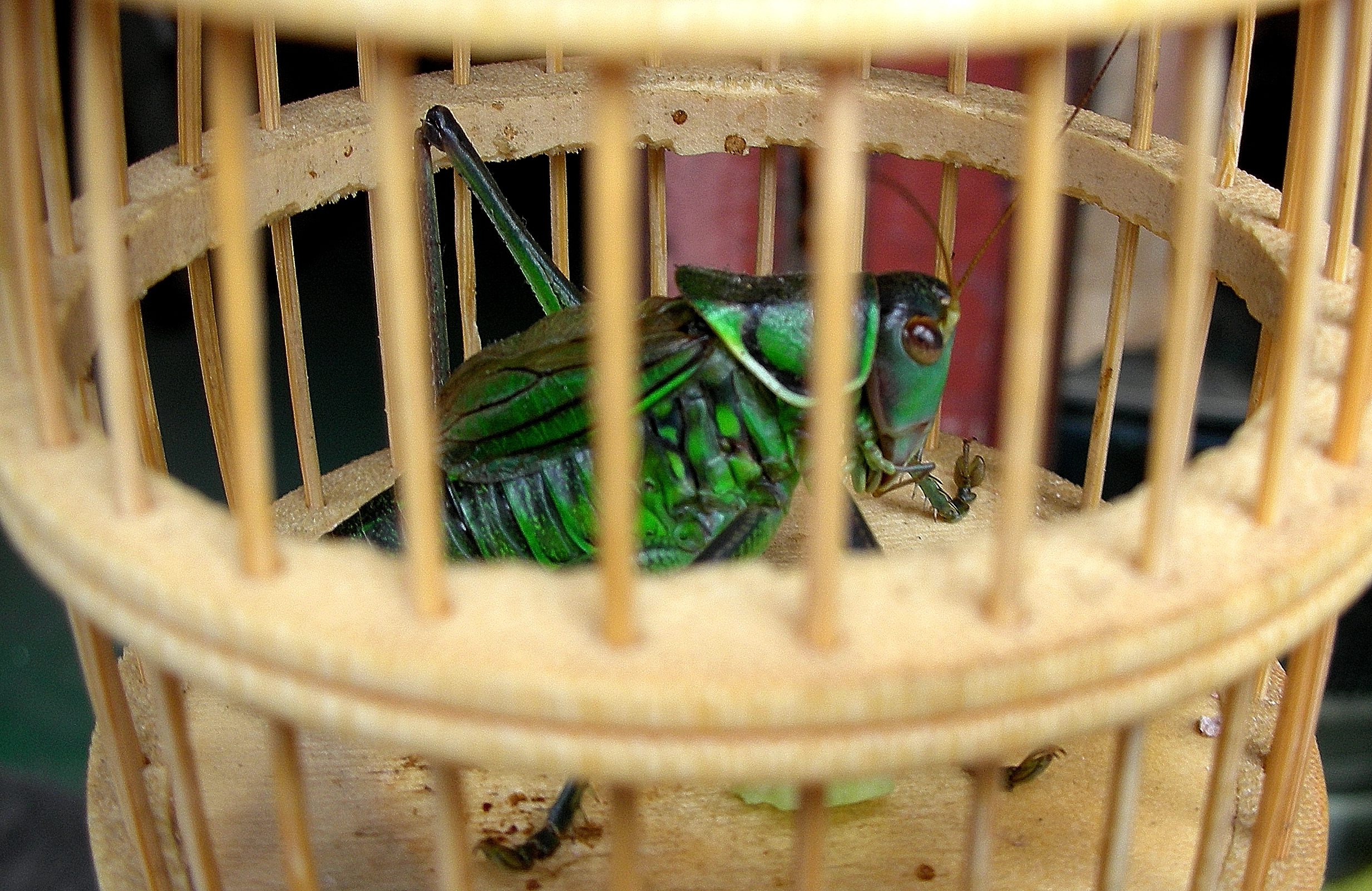

Scientific classification
- Kingdom: Animalia
- Phylum: Arthropoda
- Clade: Pancrustacea
- Class: Insecta
- Order: Orthoptera
- Suborder: Ensifera
- Family: Tettigoniidae
- Genus: Gampsocleis
- Species: G. gratiosa

Binomial name
- Gampsocleis gratiosa Brunner von Wattenwyl, 1862

= Gampsocleis gratiosa =

Species of insect

Gampsocleis gratiosa is a species of katydid in the family Tettigoniidae. Commonly known as the Chinese bush cricket or Guoguo (蝈蝈), it has been kept as a singing pet in China for over a thousand years since the Tang dynasty.
