= Gampsocleis ussuriensis =

Scientific classification
- Domain: Eukaryota
- Kingdom: Animalia
- Phylum: Arthropoda
- Class: Insecta
- Order: Orthoptera
- Suborder: Ensifera
- Family: Tettigoniidae
- Genus: Gampsocleis
- Species: G. ussuriensis

Binomial name
- Gampsocleis ussuriensis Adelung, 1910

Synonyms
- Gampsocleis amuriensis Pylnov, 1918; Gampsocleis orientalis Pylnov, 1918

Species of cricket

Gampsocleis ussuriensis is a species of bush crickets in the subfamily Tettigoniinae.

== Distribution ==
This species can be found in southeastern Russia, parts of China, the Korean peninsula, and Hokkaido, Japan.
