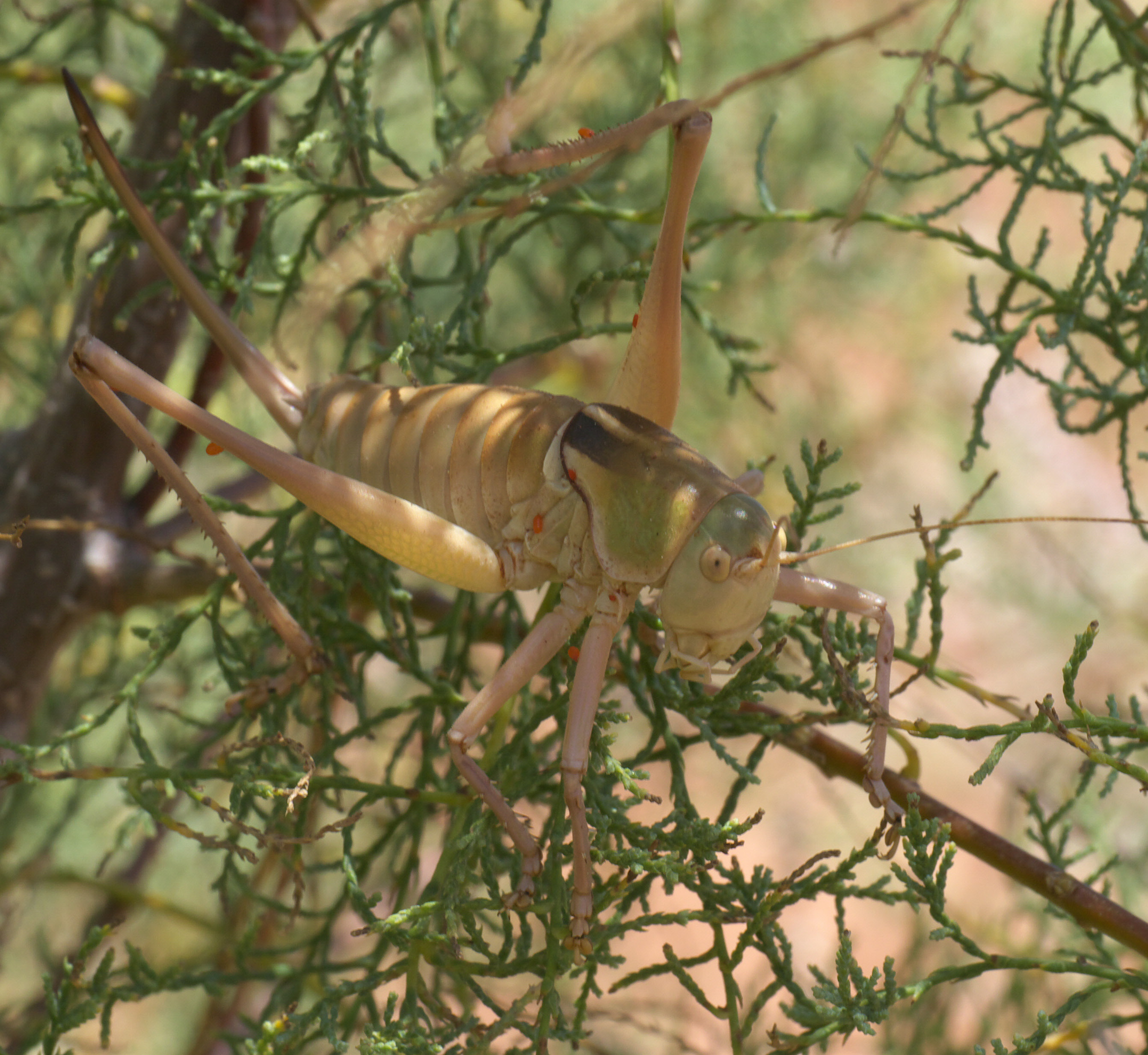

Scientific classification
- Domain: Eukaryota
- Kingdom: Animalia
- Phylum: Arthropoda
- Class: Insecta
- Order: Orthoptera
- Suborder: Ensifera
- Family: Tettigoniidae
- Genus: Pediodectes
- Species: P. haldemanii

Binomial name
- Pediodectes haldemanii (Girard, C., 1854)

= Pediodectes haldemanii =

Species of cricket-like animal

Pediodectes haldemanii, known generally as the Haldeman's shieldback or American shield-back katydid, is a species of shield-backed katydid in the family Tettigoniidae.

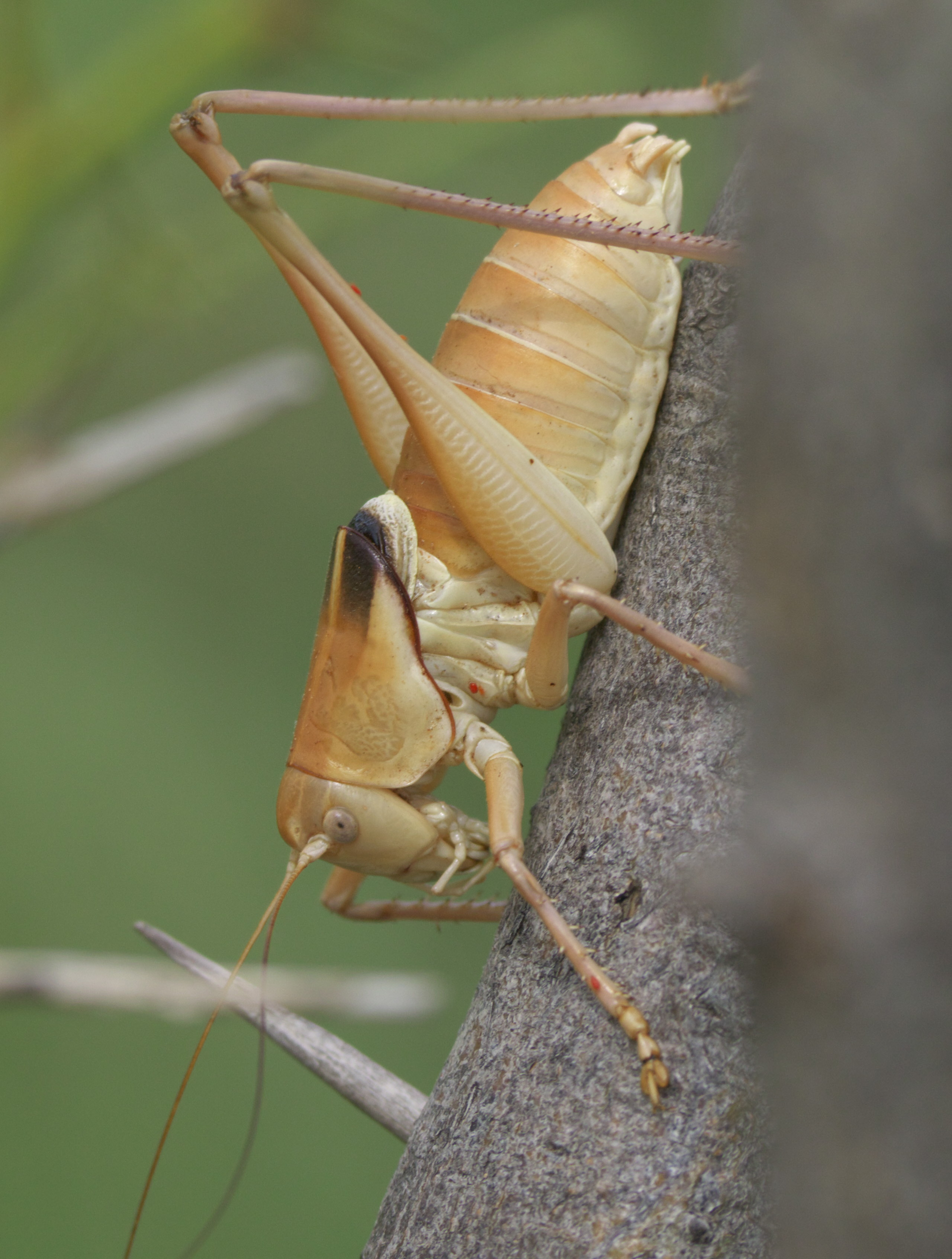
Haldeman's shieldback, Pediodectes haldemanii
