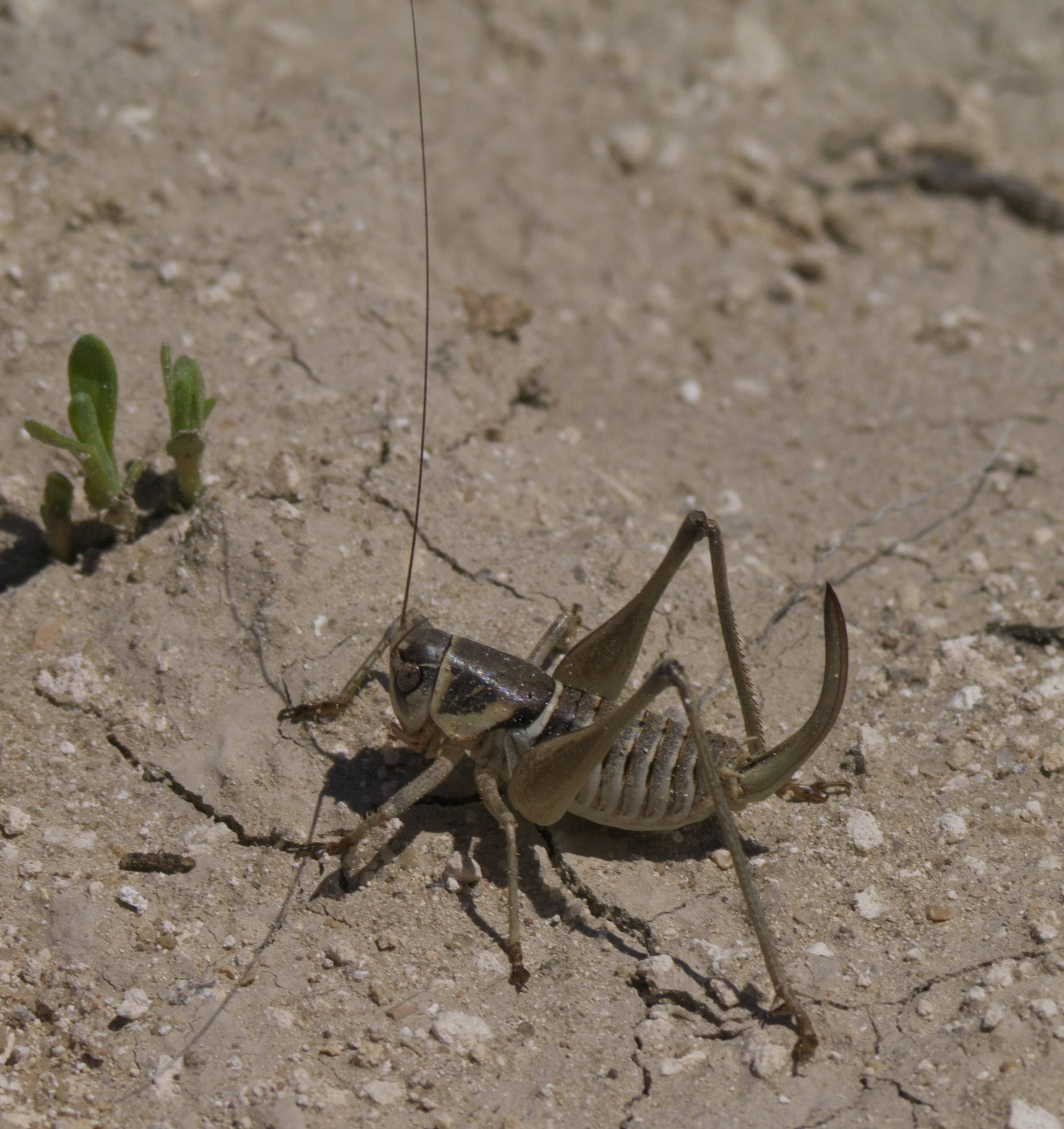

Scientific classification
- Domain: Eukaryota
- Kingdom: Animalia
- Phylum: Arthropoda
- Class: Insecta
- Order: Orthoptera
- Suborder: Ensifera
- Family: Tettigoniidae
- Genus: Pediodectes
- Species: P. stevensonii

Binomial name
- Pediodectes stevensonii (Thomas, 1870)

= Pediodectes stevensonii =

Species of cricket-like animal

Pediodectes stevensonii, or Stevenson's shieldback, is a species of shield-backed katydid in the family Tettigoniidae.

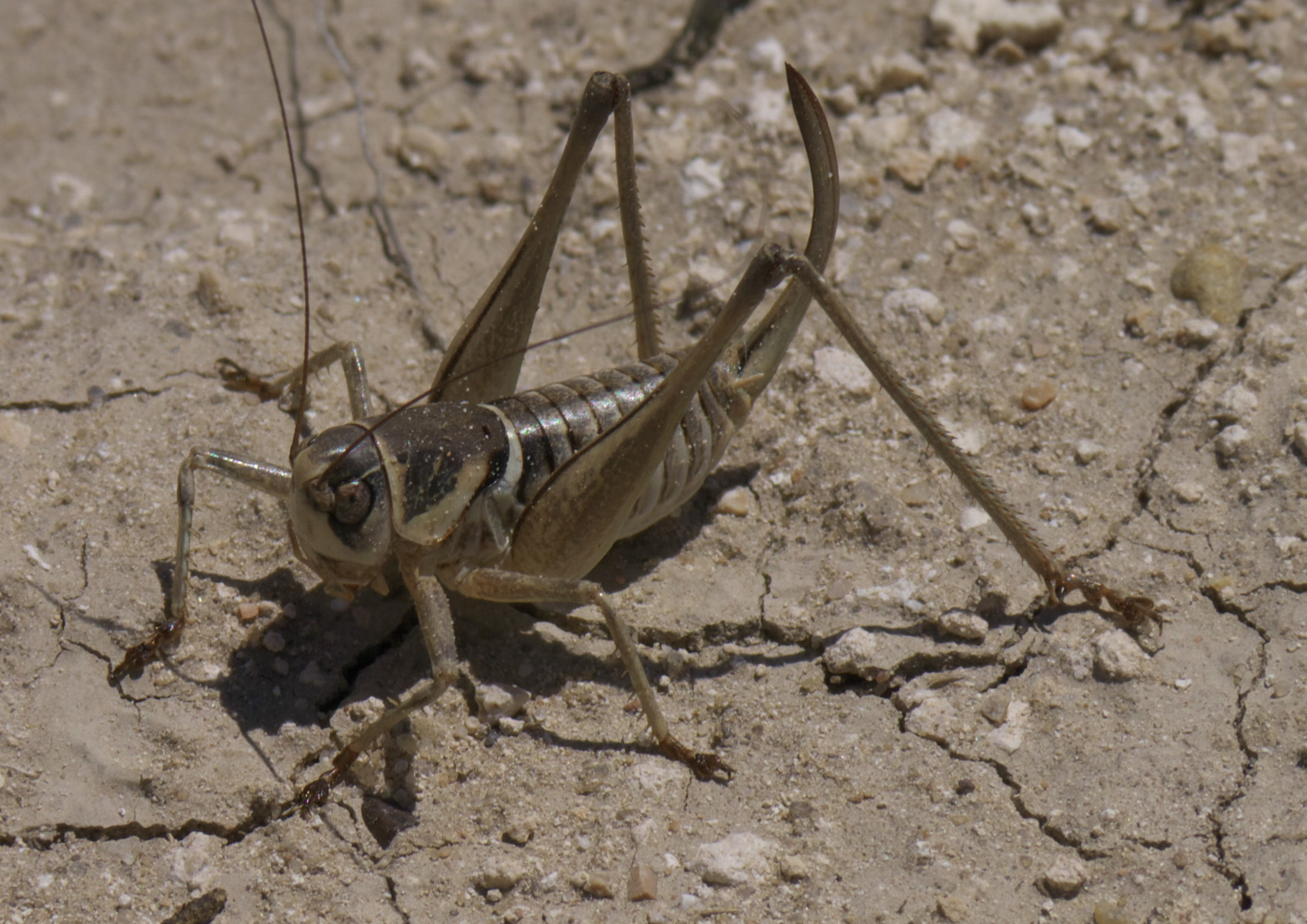
Stevenson's shieldback, Pediodectes stevensonii
