= Pediodectes grandis =

Scientific classification
- Domain: Eukaryota
- Kingdom: Animalia
- Phylum: Arthropoda
- Class: Insecta
- Order: Orthoptera
- Suborder: Ensifera
- Family: Tettigoniidae
- Tribe: Platycleidini
- Genus: Pediodectes
- Species: P. grandis

Binomial name
- Pediodectes grandis (Rehn, 1904)

Species of cricket-like animal

Pediodectes grandis, the grand shieldback, is a species of shield-backed katydid in the family Tettigoniidae. It is found in Central America and North America.

== Subspecies ==
These two subspecies belong to the species Pediodectes grandis:

- Pediodectes grandis grandis (Rehn, 1904)
- Pediodectes grandis insignis (Caudell, 1907)
