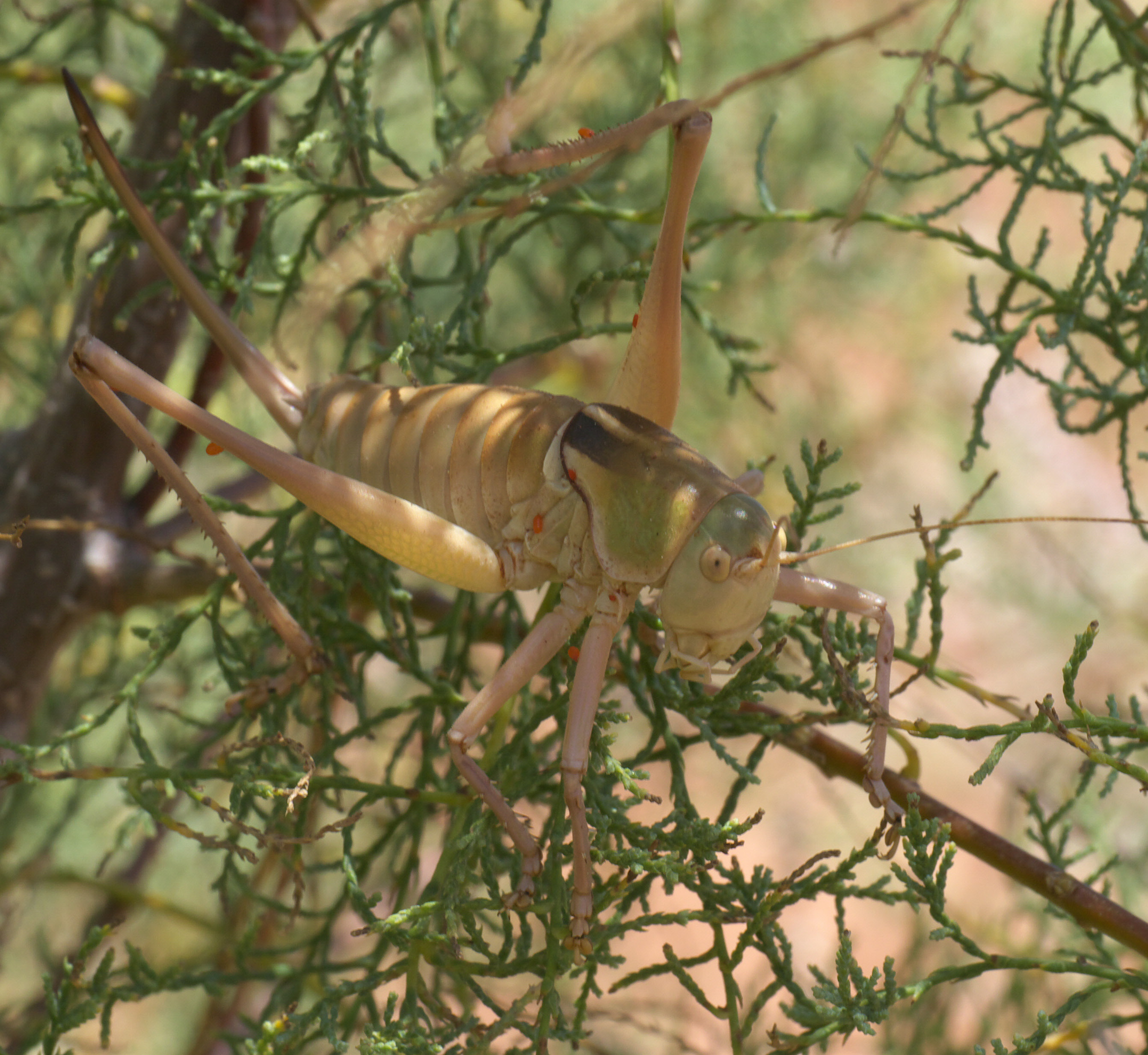
- Pediodectes haldemanii

Scientific classification
- Domain: Eukaryota
- Kingdom: Animalia
- Phylum: Arthropoda
- Class: Insecta
- Order: Orthoptera
- Suborder: Ensifera
- Family: Tettigoniidae
- Subfamily: Tettigoniinae
- Tribe: Platycleidini
- Genus: Pediodectes; Rehn & Hebard, 1916

= Pediodectes =

Genus of grasshoppers

Pediodectes is a genus of shield-backed katydids in the family Tettigoniidae. There are about nine described species in Pediodectes.

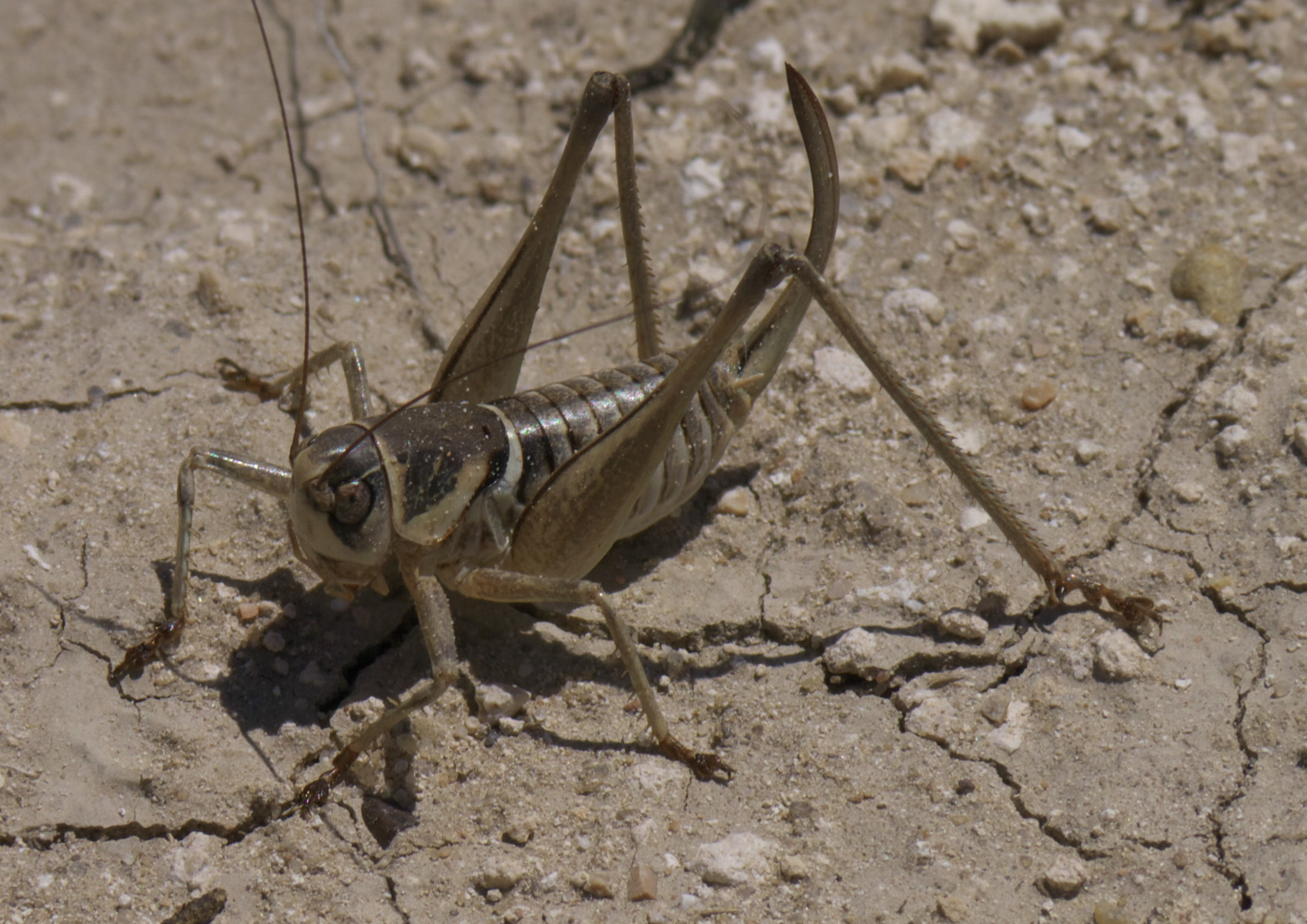
Pediodectes stevensonii, Stevenson's shieldback

== Species ==
These species belong to the genus Pediodectes:

- Pediodectes bruneri (Caudell, 1907) (bruner shieldback)
- Pediodectes daedelus (Rehn & Hebard, 1920) (daedalus shieldback)
- Pediodectes grandis (Rehn, 1904) (grand shieldback)
- Pediodectes haldemanii (Girard, 1854) (haldeman's shieldback)
- Pediodectes mitchelli (Caudell, 1911)
- Pediodectes nigromarginatus (Caudell, 1902) (black-margined shieldback)
- Pediodectes pratti (Caudell, 1911)
- Pediodectes stevensonii (Thomas, 1870) (Stevenson's shieldback)
- Pediodectes tinkhami Hebard, 1934 (Tinkham's shieldback)
