= Pediodectes bruneri =

Scientific classification
- Domain: Eukaryota
- Kingdom: Animalia
- Phylum: Arthropoda
- Class: Insecta
- Order: Orthoptera
- Suborder: Ensifera
- Family: Tettigoniidae
- Tribe: Platycleidini
- Genus: Pediodectes
- Species: P. bruneri

Binomial name
- Pediodectes bruneri (Caudell, 1907)

Species of cricket-like animal

Pediodectes bruneri, the bruner shieldback, is a species of shield-backed katydid in the family Tettigoniidae. It is found in North America.
