= Pediodectes tinkhami =

Scientific classification
- Domain: Eukaryota
- Kingdom: Animalia
- Phylum: Arthropoda
- Class: Insecta
- Order: Orthoptera
- Suborder: Ensifera
- Family: Tettigoniidae
- Genus: Pediodectes
- Species: P. tinkhami

Binomial name
- Pediodectes tinkhami Hebard, 1934

Species of cricket-like animal

Pediodectes tinkhami, or Tinkham's shieldback, is a species of shield-backed katydid in the family Tettigoniidae. It is found in North America.
