= Pediodectes nigromarginatus =

Scientific classification
- Domain: Eukaryota
- Kingdom: Animalia
- Phylum: Arthropoda
- Class: Insecta
- Order: Orthoptera
- Suborder: Ensifera
- Family: Tettigoniidae
- Tribe: Platycleidini
- Genus: Pediodectes
- Species: P. nigromarginatus

Binomial name
- Pediodectes nigromarginatus (Caudell, 1902)

Species of cricket-like animal

Pediodectes nigromarginatus, the black-margined shieldback, is a species of shield-backed katydid in the family Tettigoniidae. It is found in North America.

== Subspecies ==
These two subspecies belong to the species Pediodectes nigromarginatus:

- Pediodectes nigromarginatus griseis (Caudell, 1907)
- Pediodectes nigromarginatus nigromarginatus (Caudell, 1902)
