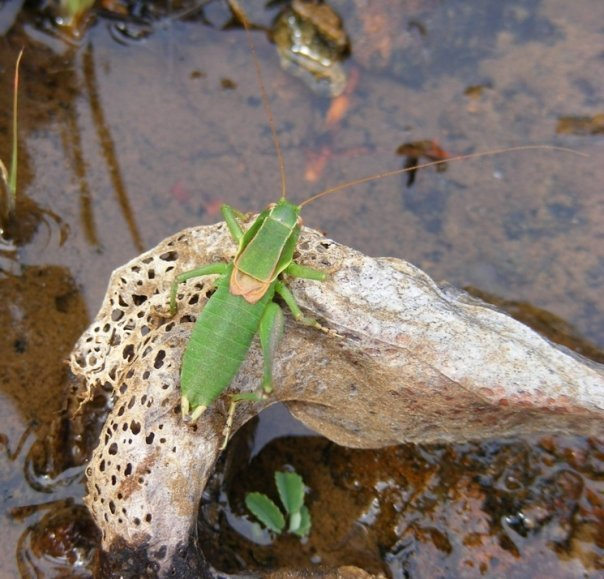

Scientific classification
- Domain: Eukaryota
- Kingdom: Animalia
- Phylum: Arthropoda
- Class: Insecta
- Order: Orthoptera
- Suborder: Ensifera
- Family: Tettigoniidae
- Tribe: Platycleidini
- Genus: Idiostatus
- Species: I. gurneyi

Binomial name
- Idiostatus gurneyi Rentz, 1973

= Idiostatus gurneyi =

Species of cricket-like animal

Idiostatus gurneyi, or Gurney's shieldback, is a species of shield-backed katydid in the family Tettigoniidae. It is found in North America.
