= Idiostatus middlekauffi =

Conservation status
- Critically Endangered (IUCN 2.3)

- Critically Imperiled (NatureServe)

Scientific classification
- Kingdom: Animalia
- Phylum: Arthropoda
- Class: Insecta
- Order: Orthoptera
- Suborder: Ensifera
- Family: Tettigoniidae
- Genus: Idiostatus
- Species: I. middlekauffi

Binomial name
- Idiostatus middlekauffi Rentz, 1973

Species of cricket-like animal

Idiostatus middlekauffi, known as Middlekauff's shieldback katydid, is a species of katydid endemic to the United States. It is listed as critically endangered on the IUCN Red List.
