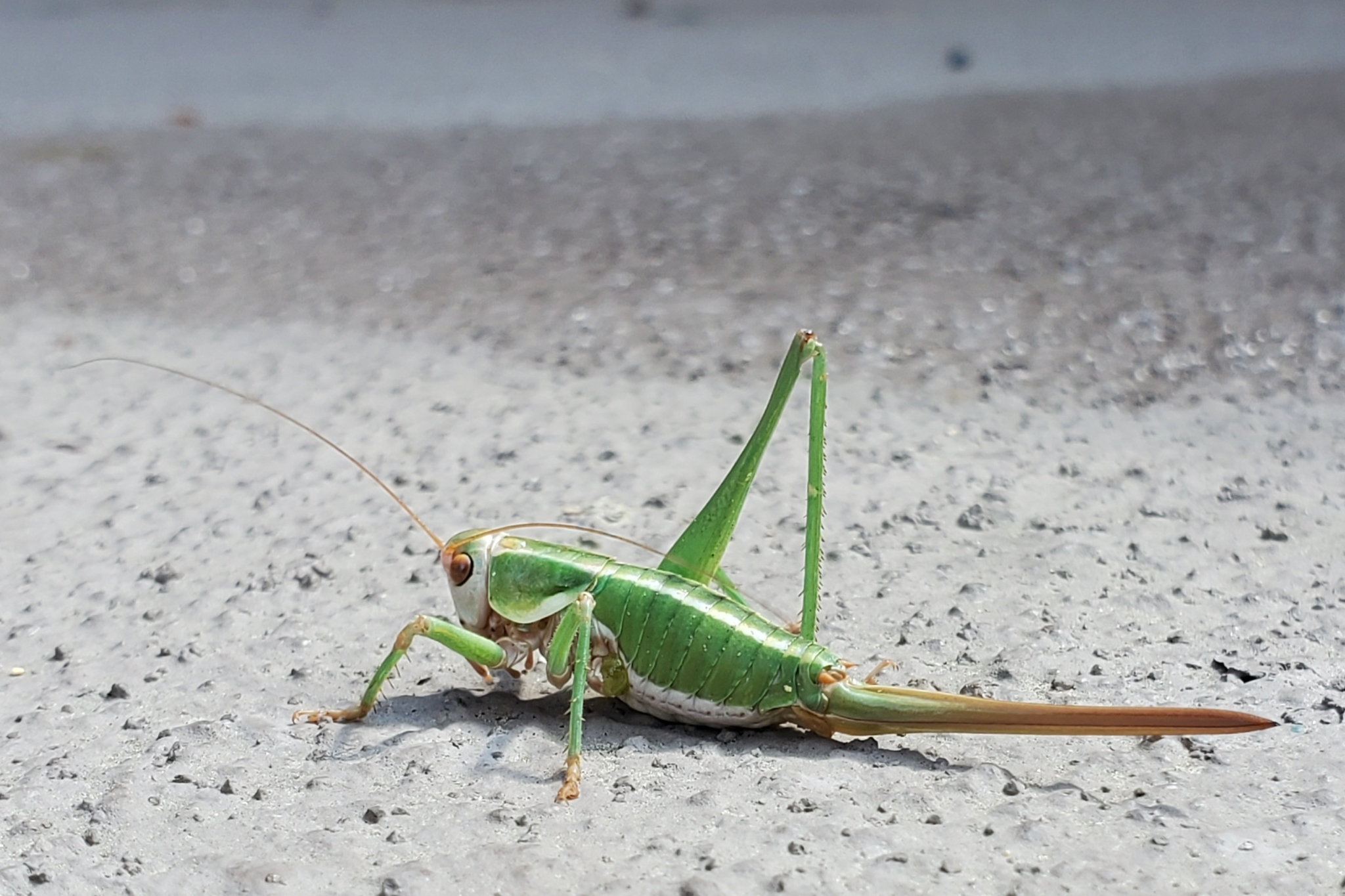
- Idiostatus viridis

Scientific classification
- Kingdom: Animalia
- Phylum: Arthropoda
- Class: Insecta
- Order: Orthoptera
- Suborder: Ensifera
- Family: Tettigoniidae
- Tribe: Platycleidini
- Genus: Idiostatus; Pictet, 1888

= Idiostatus =

Genus of cricket-like animals

Idiostatus is a genus of insects in the family Tettigoniidae and tribe Platycleidini, which are native to western North America.

The lateral lobes of the prothorax are as deep as they are long.

== Species ==
These 28 species belong to the genus Idiostatus:

- Idiostatus aberrans Rentz, 1973^{i c g}
- Idiostatus aequalis (Scudder, 1899)^{i c g b} (uniform shieldback)
- Idiostatus apollo Rentz, 1973^{i c g b} (Apollo shieldback)
- Idiostatus bechteli Rentz, 1973^{i c g}
- Idiostatus bilineatus (Thomas, 1875)^{i}
- Idiostatus birchimi Rentz, 1973^{i c g}
- Idiostatus californicus Pictet, 1888^{i c g b} (Pictet's shieldback)
- Idiostatus callimerus Rehn and Hebard, 1920^{i c g} (Pretty-thigh shieldback)
- Idiostatus chewaucan Rentz and Lightfoot, 1976^{i c g}
- Idiostatus elegans Caudell, 1907^{i c g}
- Idiostatus fuscopunctatus (Scudder, 1899)^{i c g}
- Idiostatus fuscus Caudell, 1934^{i c g b}
- Idiostatus goedeni Rentz, 1978^{i c g}
- Idiostatus gurneyi Rentz, 1973^{i c g b} (Gurney's shieldback)
- Idiostatus hermannii (Thomas, C., 1875)^{c g b} (Hermann's shieldback)
- Idiostatus inermis (Scudder, 1899)^{i c g}
- Idiostatus inermoides Rentz, 1973^{i c g} (Humboldt shieldback)
- Idiostatus inyo Rehn and Hebard, 1920^{i c g}
- Idiostatus kathleenae Rentz, 1973^{i c g} (Pinnacles shieldback)
- Idiostatus magnificus Hebard, 1934^{i c g}
- Idiostatus major Caudell, 1934^{i c g}
- Idiostatus martinellii Rentz, 1973^{i c g}
- Idiostatus middlekauffi Rentz, 1973^{i c g} (Middlekauff's shieldback)
- Idiostatus rehni Caudell, 1907^{i c g} (Rehn's shieldback)
- Idiostatus sinuata (Scudder, 1899)^{i}
- Idiostatus variegatus Caudell, 1907^{i c g b} (variegated shield-back)
- Idiostatus viridis Rentz, 1973^{i c g}
- Idiostatus wymorei Caudell, 1934^{i c g}

Data sources: i = ITIS, c = Catalogue of Life, g = GBIF, b = Bugguide.net
