= Idiostatus fuscus =

Scientific classification
- Domain: Eukaryota
- Kingdom: Animalia
- Phylum: Arthropoda
- Class: Insecta
- Order: Orthoptera
- Suborder: Ensifera
- Family: Tettigoniidae
- Tribe: Platycleidini
- Genus: Idiostatus
- Species: I. fuscus

Binomial name
- Idiostatus fuscus Caudell, 1934

Species of cricket-like animal

Idiostatus fuscus is a species of shield-backed katydid in the family Tettigoniidae. It is found in North America.
