= Atlanticus gibbosus =

Scientific classification
- Domain: Eukaryota
- Kingdom: Animalia
- Phylum: Arthropoda
- Class: Insecta
- Order: Orthoptera
- Suborder: Ensifera
- Family: Tettigoniidae
- Tribe: Drymadusini
- Genus: Atlanticus
- Species: A. gibbosus

Binomial name
- Atlanticus gibbosus (Scudder, 1894)

Species of cricket-like animal

Atlanticus gibbosus, known generally as the robust shieldback or robust shield-bearer, is a species of shield-backed katydid in the family Tettigoniidae. It is found in North America.
