= Atlanticus testaceus =

Scientific classification
- Kingdom: Animalia
- Phylum: Arthropoda
- Clade: Pancrustacea
- Class: Insecta
- Order: Orthoptera
- Suborder: Ensifera
- Family: Tettigoniidae
- Tribe: Drymadusini
- Genus: Atlanticus
- Species: A. testaceus

Binomial name
- Atlanticus testaceus Scudder, 1901

Species of cricket-like animal

Atlanticus testaceus, known generally as the protean shieldback or short-legged shield-bearer, is a species of shield-backed katydid in the family Tettigoniidae. It is found in North America.

== Identification ==
The males' tegmina are around 1/2 the length of the pronotum.

== Distribution ==
This species can be found from the Great Lakes, New York and southern Ontario southward to Kentucky and Virginia. Further south, it is replaced by Atlanticus pachymerus.

== Behavior ==
This species is mostly active in the evening, but will still be active in the daytime, especially in cloudy conditions. They spend the daytime hiding under dried leaves, and in the evening, they climb the vegetation, and males begin stridulating intensively while females move from plant to plant, searching for mates and prey items. They descend from the vegetation around 2–4 AM, and then stop stridulating.

=== Diet ===
Young nymphs eat mostly green plant tissues. Adult females are mostly carnivorous, while adult males eat mostly dried leaves and sand. They also will eat their own species.
