= Atlanticus pachymerus =

Scientific classification
- Kingdom: Animalia
- Phylum: Arthropoda
- Class: Insecta
- Order: Orthoptera
- Suborder: Ensifera
- Family: Tettigoniidae
- Tribe: Drymadusini
- Genus: Atlanticus
- Species: A. pachymerus

Binomial name
- Atlanticus pachymerus (Burmeister, 1838)

Species of cricket-like animal

Atlanticus pachymerus, the southern protean shieldback, is a species of shield-backed katydid in the family Tettigoniidae. It is found in North America.

This species is very similar to the related Atlanticus testaceus.

== Distribution ==
It lives in the Ozark/Ouachita region of eastern Oklahoma, Missouri and Arkansas eastward to North and South Carolina, also apparently west into southeastern Oklahoma and northeast Texas. It is replaced further north by A. testaceus.
