= Atlanticus davisi =

Scientific classification
- Domain: Eukaryota
- Kingdom: Animalia
- Phylum: Arthropoda
- Class: Insecta
- Order: Orthoptera
- Suborder: Ensifera
- Family: Tettigoniidae
- Tribe: Drymadusini
- Genus: Atlanticus
- Species: A. davisi

Binomial name
- Atlanticus davisi Rehn & Hebard, 1916

Species of cricket-like animal

Atlanticus davisi, known generally as the Davis's shieldback or Davis's shield-bearer, is a species of shield-backed katydid in the family Tettigoniidae. It is found in North America.
