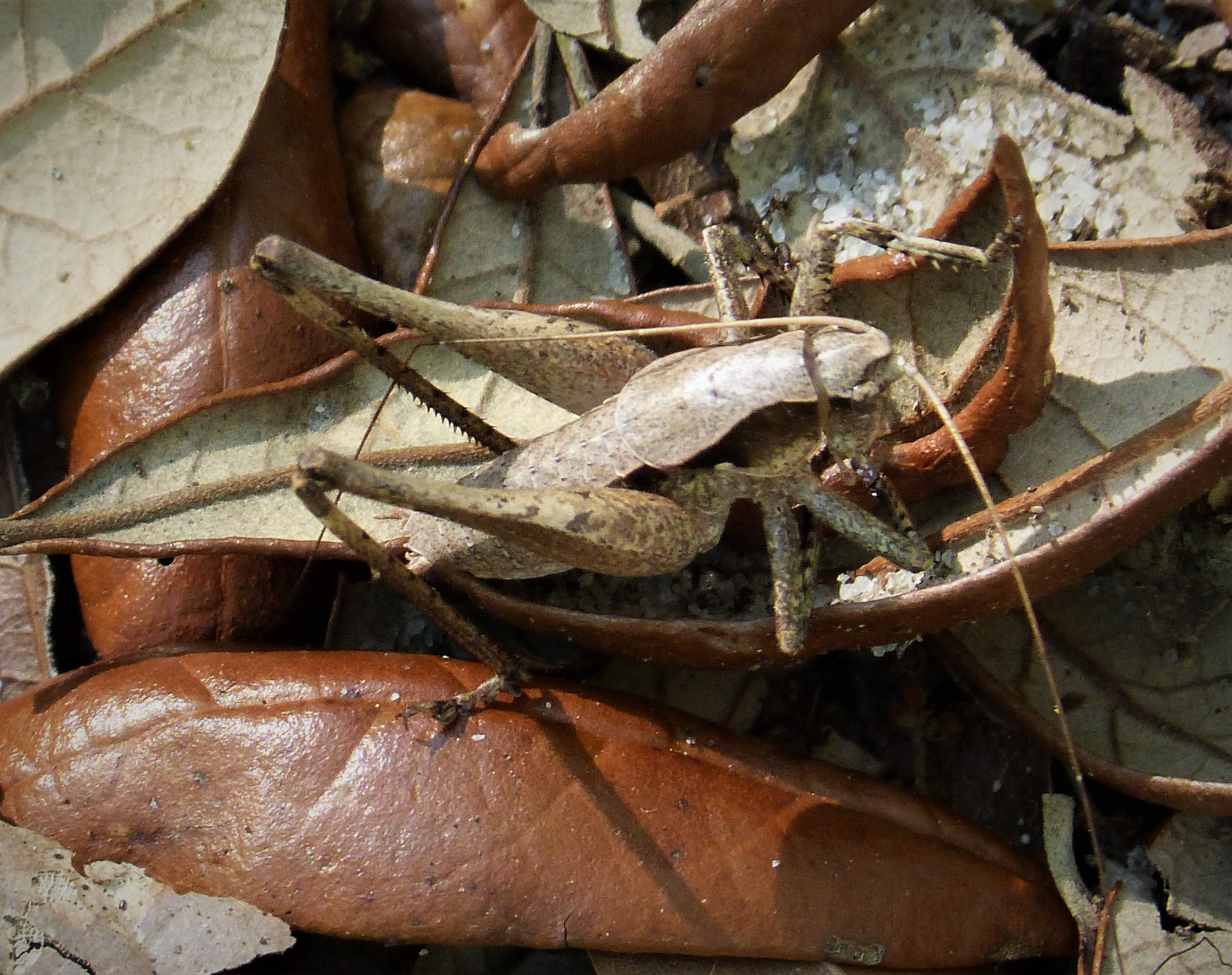
- Atlanticus sp. male

Scientific classification
- Domain: Eukaryota
- Kingdom: Animalia
- Phylum: Arthropoda
- Class: Insecta
- Order: Orthoptera
- Suborder: Ensifera
- Family: Tettigoniidae
- Subfamily: Tettigoniinae
- Tribe: Drymadusini
- Genus: Atlanticus; Scudder, 1894

= Atlanticus =

Genus of cricket-like animals

Atlanticus is a genus of bush crickets or katydids in the tribe Drymadusini. It has a discontinuous recorded distribution (possibly incomplete) in North America and temperate eastern Asia.

== Species ==
These 59 species belong to the genus Atlanticus:

- Atlanticus abeitaii Liu, 2013
- Atlanticus ahunanensis Liu, 2013
- Atlanticus akangxiani Liu, 2013
- Atlanticus akulingensis Liu, 2013
- Atlanticus americanus (Saussure, 1859) (American shieldback)
- Atlanticus beitaii Liu, 2013
- Atlanticus bikouensis Zheng & Shi, 1999
- Atlanticus brevicaudus Bey-Bienko, 1955
- Atlanticus brunneri (Pylnov, 1914)
- Atlanticus calcaratus Rehn & Hebard, 1916
- Atlanticus changi Tinkham, 1941
- Atlanticus davisi Rehn & Hebard, 1916 (Davis's shieldback)
- Atlanticus donglingi Liu, 2013
- Atlanticus dorsalis (Burmeister, 1838)
- Atlanticus fairyi Liu, 2013
- Atlanticus fallax He, 2018
- Atlanticus fengyangensis Liu, 2013
- Atlanticus gibbosus (Scudder, 1894) (robust shieldback)
- Atlanticus glaber Rehn & Hebard, 1912
- Atlanticus grahami Tinkham, 1941
- Atlanticus hefengensis Liu, 2013
- Atlanticus helleri Liu, Wang & Cheng, 2016
- Atlanticus hoffmanni Tinkham, 1941
- Atlanticus huangfu Liu, 2013
- Atlanticus huangshanensis Shi & Zheng, 1994
- Atlanticus hunanensis Du & Shi, 2005
- Atlanticus interval He, 2018
- Atlanticus jeholensis Mori, 1935
- Atlanticus jiangyei Liu, Wang & Cheng, 2016
- Atlanticus jiuchongensis Liu, 2013
- Atlanticus jixiani Liu, 2013
- Atlanticus kangi Liu, 2013
- Atlanticus kangxiani Liu, 2013
- Atlanticus karnyi Ebner, 1939
- Atlanticus kiangsu Ramme, 1939
- Atlanticus kulingensis Tinkham, 1941
- Atlanticus kwangtungensis Tinkham, 1941
- Atlanticus macropterus Liu, 2013
- Atlanticus magnificus Tinkham, 1941
- Atlanticus medius Liu, 2013
- Atlanticus minimus Liu, 2013
- Atlanticus minor Liu, 2013
- Atlanticus monticola Davis, 1915 (least shieldback)
- Atlanticus pachymerus (Burmeister, 1838) (southern protean shieldback)
- Atlanticus palpalis Rehn & Hebard, 1920
- Atlanticus parabeitaii Liu, 2013
- Atlanticus parakangxiani Liu, 2013
- Atlanticus pieli Tinkham, 1941
- Atlanticus plateau Liu, 2013
- Atlanticus qinshuii Liu, 2013
- Atlanticus robustus Bey-Bienko, 1951
- Atlanticus ruichengi Liu, 2013
- Atlanticus scudderi (Bruner, 1886)
- Atlanticus sinensis Uvarov, 1924
- Atlanticus testaceus Scudder, 1901 (protean shieldback)
- Atlanticus wudangensis Liu, 2013
- Atlanticus yashani Liu, 2013
- Atlanticus zhongyangi Liu, 2013
- Atlanticus zhouzhii Liu, 2013
