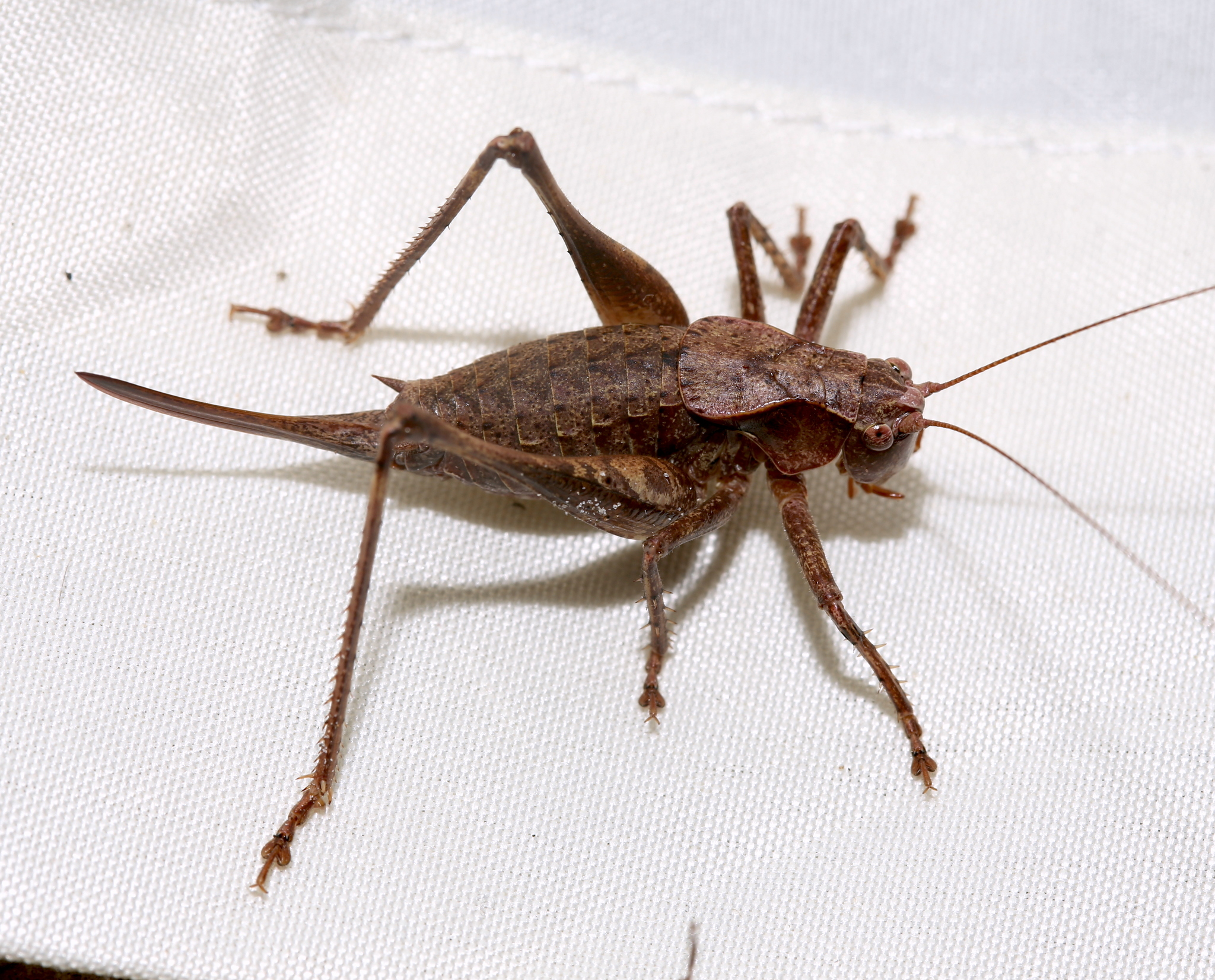

Scientific classification
- Kingdom: Animalia
- Phylum: Arthropoda
- Clade: Pancrustacea
- Class: Insecta
- Order: Orthoptera
- Suborder: Ensifera
- Family: Tettigoniidae
- Tribe: Drymadusini
- Genus: Atlanticus
- Species: A. monticola

Binomial name
- Atlanticus monticola Davis, 1915

= Atlanticus monticola =

Species of cricket-like animal

Atlanticus monticola, known generally as the least shieldback or Davis' shield-bearer, is a species of shield-backed katydid in the family Tettigoniidae. It is found in North America, in the central and southern Appalachians.
