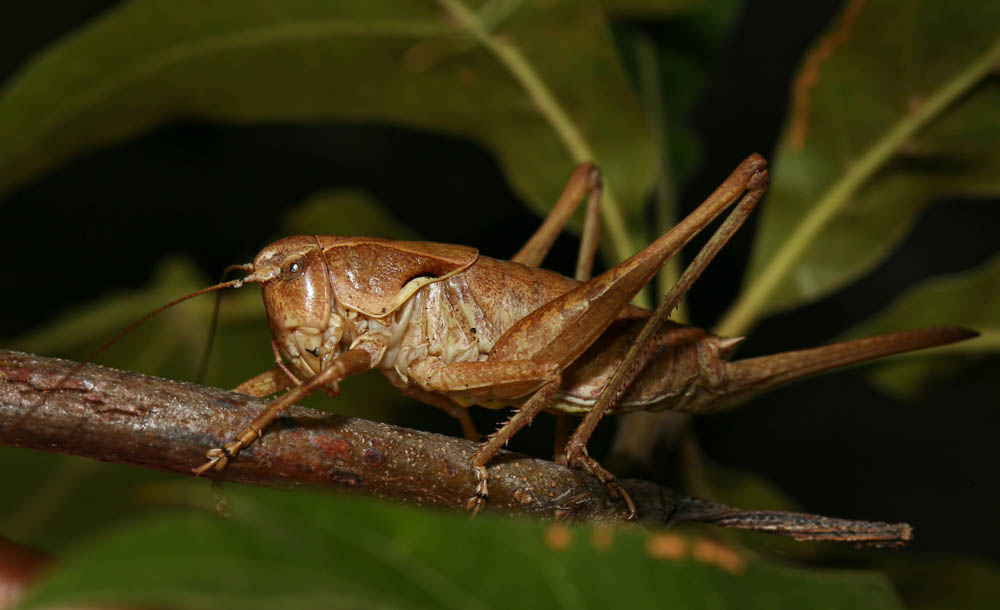

Scientific classification
- Kingdom: Animalia
- Phylum: Arthropoda
- Class: Insecta
- Order: Orthoptera
- Suborder: Ensifera
- Family: Tettigoniidae
- Tribe: Drymadusini
- Genus: Atlanticus
- Species: A. americanus

Binomial name
- Atlanticus americanus (Saussure, 1859)

= Atlanticus americanus =

Species of shield-backed katydid

Atlanticus americanus, known generally as the American shieldback or American shield-bearer, is a species of shield-backed katydid in the family Tettigoniidae. It is found in North America.

== Subspecies ==
These two subspecies belong to the species Atlanticus americanus:

- Atlanticus americanus americanus (Saussure, 1859)
- Atlanticus americanus hesperus Hebard, 1934
