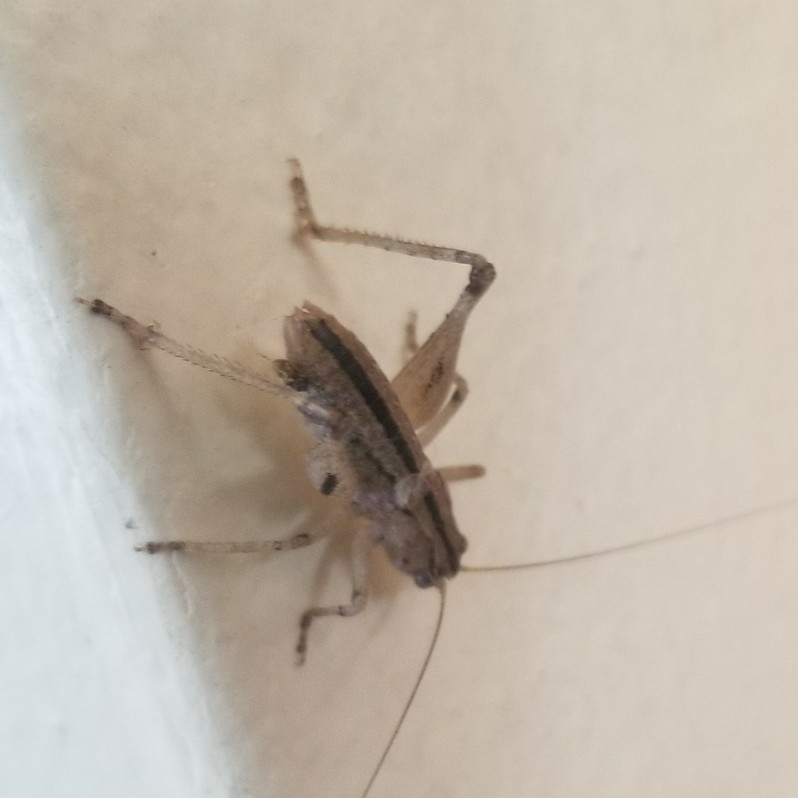
- Ateloplus notatus

Scientific classification
- Domain: Eukaryota
- Kingdom: Animalia
- Phylum: Arthropoda
- Class: Insecta
- Order: Orthoptera
- Suborder: Ensifera
- Family: Tettigoniidae
- Subfamily: Tettigoniinae
- Tribe: Tettigoniini
- Genus: Ateloplus; Scudder, 1894

= Ateloplus =

Genus of cricket-like animals

Ateloplus is a genus of shield-backed katydids in the family Tettigoniidae. There are about eight described species in Ateloplus.

== Species ==
These eight species belong to the genus Ateloplus:

- Ateloplus coconino Hebard, 1935
- Ateloplus hesperus Hebard, 1934
- Ateloplus joaquin Rentz, 1972
- Ateloplus luteus Caudell, 1907 (yellow shieldback)
- Ateloplus minor Caudell, 1907
- Ateloplus notatus Scudder, 1901
- Ateloplus schwarzi Caudell, 1907
- Ateloplus splendidus Hebard, 1934
