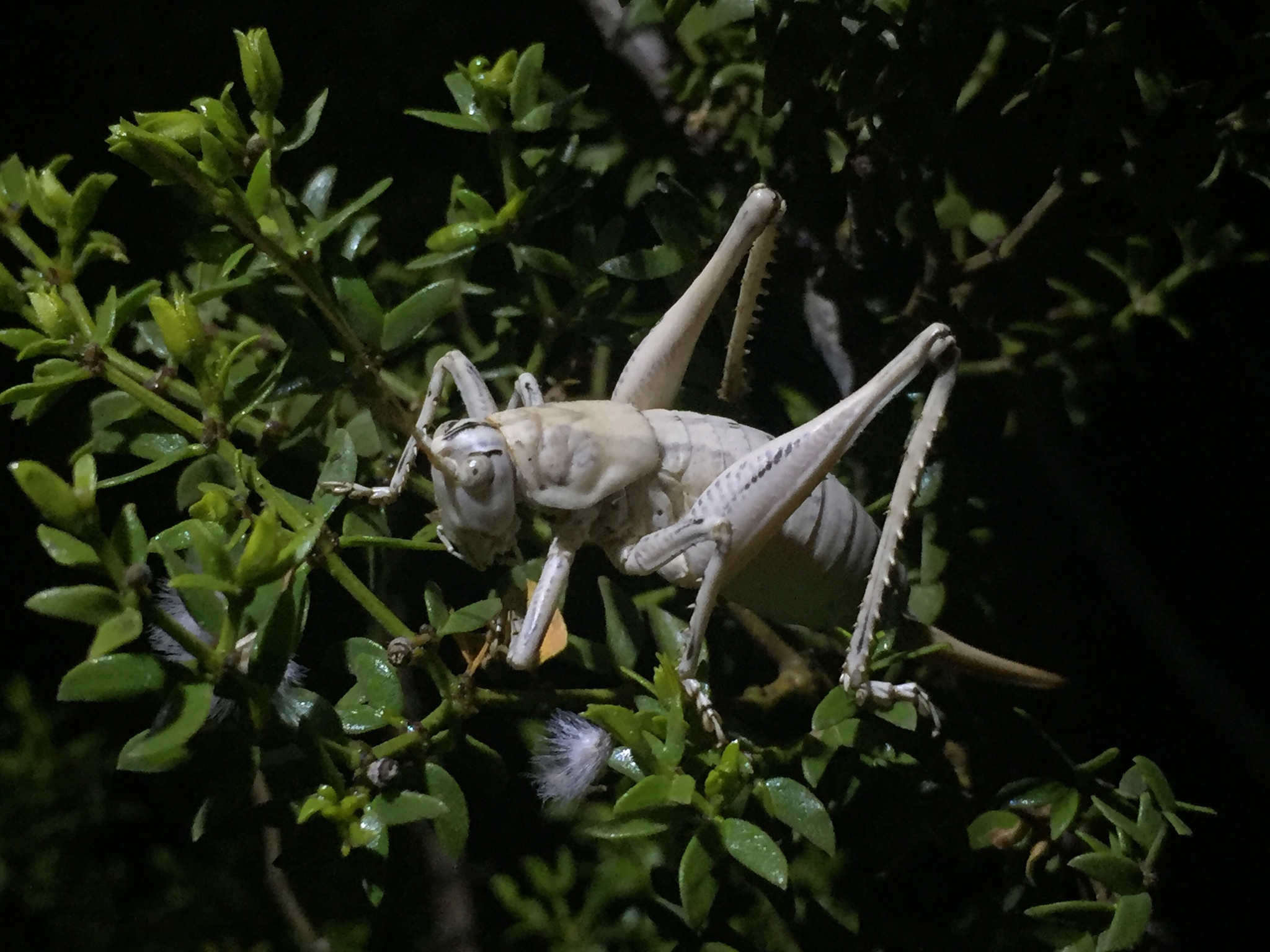

Scientific classification
- Domain: Eukaryota
- Kingdom: Animalia
- Phylum: Arthropoda
- Class: Insecta
- Order: Orthoptera
- Suborder: Ensifera
- Family: Tettigoniidae
- Tribe: Tettigoniini
- Genus: Ateloplus
- Species: A. splendidus

Binomial name
- Ateloplus splendidus Hebard, 1934

= Ateloplus splendidus =

Species of cricket-like animal

Ateloplus splendidus is a species of shield-backed katydid in the family Tettigoniidae. It is found in North America.
