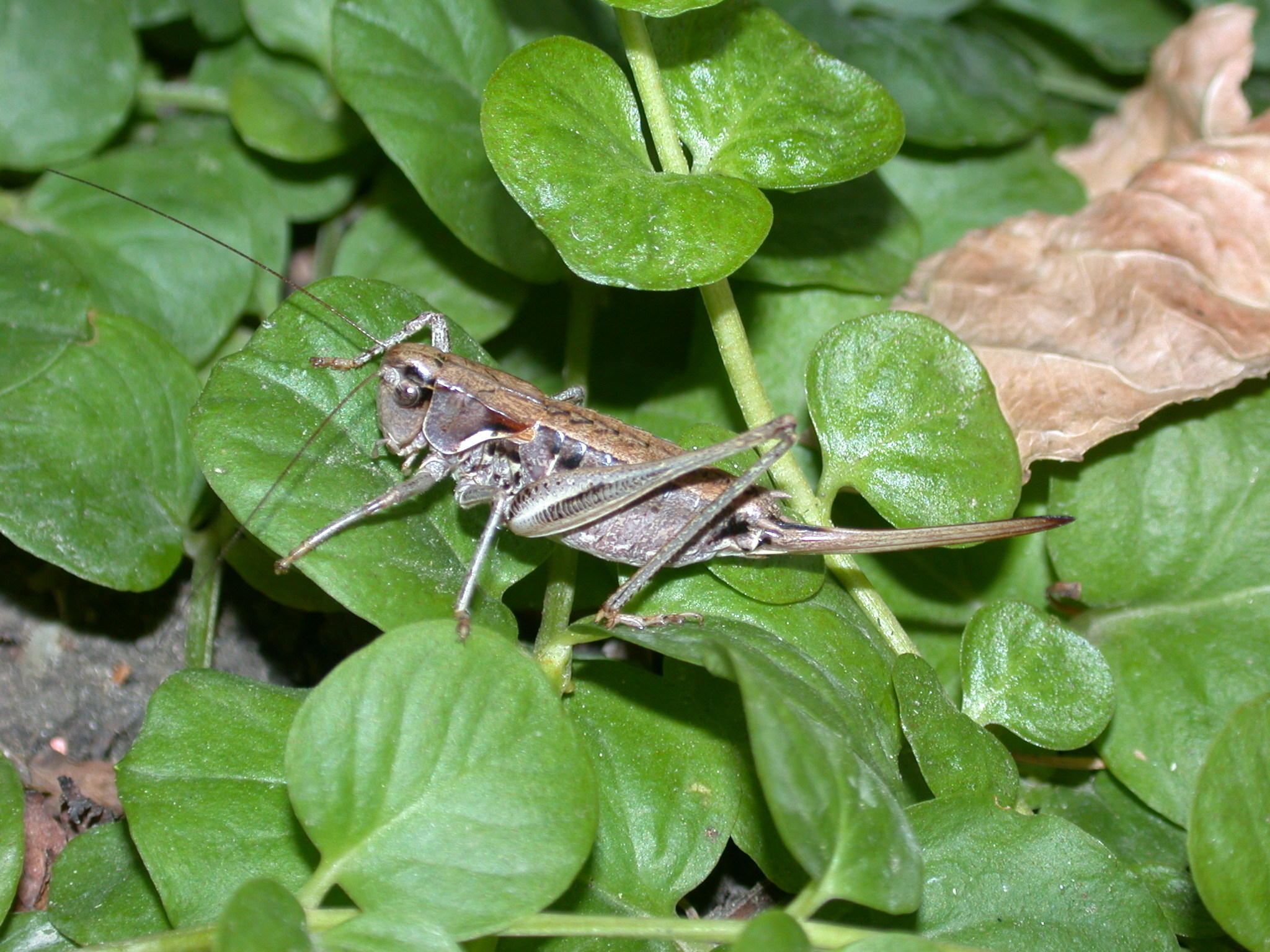

Scientific classification
- Domain: Eukaryota
- Kingdom: Animalia
- Phylum: Arthropoda
- Class: Insecta
- Order: Orthoptera
- Suborder: Ensifera
- Family: Tettigoniidae
- Genus: Steiroxys
- Species: S. trilineata

Binomial name
- Steiroxys trilineata (Thomas, 1870)

= Steiroxys trilineata =

Species of cricket-like animal

Steiroxys trilineata, the three-lined shieldback, is a species of shield-backed katydid in the family Tettigoniidae. It is found in North America.
