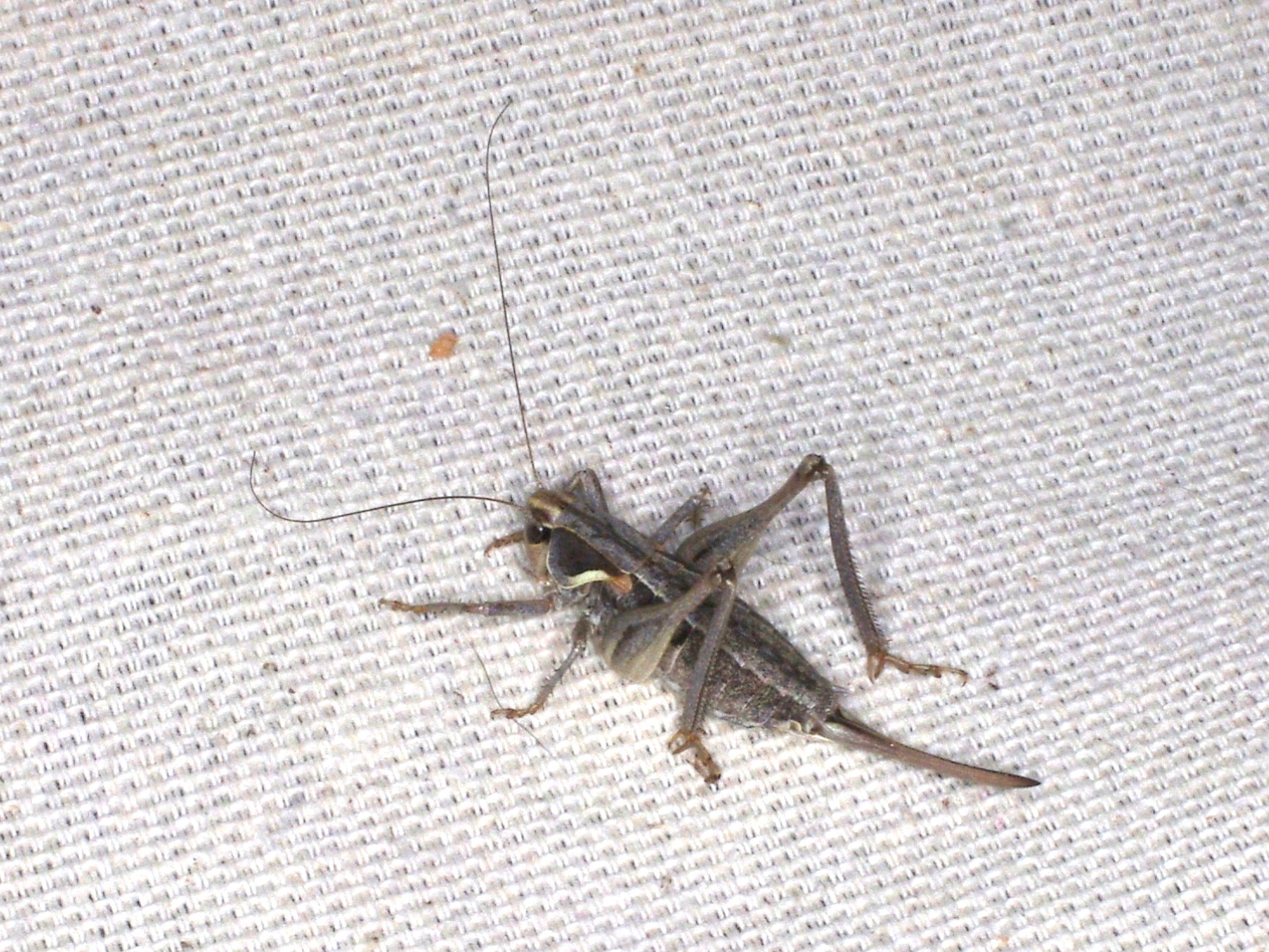

Scientific classification
- Domain: Eukaryota
- Kingdom: Animalia
- Phylum: Arthropoda
- Class: Insecta
- Order: Orthoptera
- Suborder: Ensifera
- Family: Tettigoniidae
- Subfamily: Tettigoniinae
- Tribe: Platycleidini
- Genus: Steiroxys; Herman, 1874

= Steiroxys =

Genus of cricket-like animals

Steiroxys is a genus of shield-backed katydids in the family Tettigoniidae.

== Species ==
These four species belong to the genus Steiroxys:

- Steiroxys borealis Scudder, 1894
- Steiroxys pallidipalpus (Thomas, 1872) (steiroxys pallidipennis)
- Steiroxys strepens Fulton, 1930 (noisy shieldback)
- Steiroxys trilineata (Thomas, C., 1870) (three-lined shieldback)
