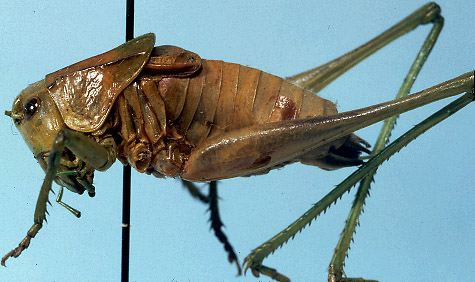

Scientific classification
- Domain: Eukaryota
- Kingdom: Animalia
- Phylum: Arthropoda
- Class: Insecta
- Order: Orthoptera
- Suborder: Ensifera
- Family: Tettigoniidae
- Genus: Steiroxys
- Species: S. strepens

Binomial name
- Steiroxys strepens Fulton, 1930

= Steiroxys strepens =

Species of cricket-like animal

Steiroxys strepens, known generally as the noisy shieldback or shield-backed katydid, is a species of shield-backed katydid in the family Tettigoniidae. It is found in North America.
