= Steiroxys pallidipalpus =

Scientific classification
- Domain: Eukaryota
- Kingdom: Animalia
- Phylum: Arthropoda
- Class: Insecta
- Order: Orthoptera
- Suborder: Ensifera
- Family: Tettigoniidae
- Tribe: Platycleidini
- Genus: Steiroxys
- Species: S. pallidipalpus

Binomial name
- Steiroxys pallidipalpus (Thomas, 1872)

Species of cricket-like animal

Steiroxys pallidipalpus, the steiroxys pallidipennis, is a species of shield-backed katydid in the family Tettigoniidae. It is found in North America.
