= Decticita =

Scientific classification
- Domain: Eukaryota
- Kingdom: Animalia
- Phylum: Arthropoda
- Class: Insecta
- Order: Orthoptera
- Suborder: Ensifera
- Family: Tettigoniidae
- Subfamily: Tettigoniinae
- Tribe: Platycleidini
- Genus: Decticita; Hebard, 1939

Genus of cricket-like animals

Decticita is a genus of shield-backed katydids in the family Tettigoniidae. There are at least three described species in Decticita.

== Species ==
These three species belong to the genus Decticita:

- Decticita balli Hebard, 1939 (Ball's little shieldback)
- Decticita brevicauda (Caudell, 1907) (short-winged shieldback)
- Decticita yosemite Rentz & Birchim, 1968 (Yosemite shieldback)
