= Decticita yosemite =

Scientific classification
- Domain: Eukaryota
- Kingdom: Animalia
- Phylum: Arthropoda
- Class: Insecta
- Order: Orthoptera
- Suborder: Ensifera
- Family: Tettigoniidae
- Tribe: Platycleidini
- Genus: Decticita
- Species: D. yosemite

Binomial name
- Decticita yosemite Rentz & Birchim, 1968

Species of cricket-like animal

Decticita yosemite, the Yosemite shieldback, is a species of shield-backed katydid in the family Tettigoniidae. It is found in North America.
