= Decticita brevicauda =

Scientific classification
- Domain: Eukaryota
- Kingdom: Animalia
- Phylum: Arthropoda
- Class: Insecta
- Order: Orthoptera
- Suborder: Ensifera
- Family: Tettigoniidae
- Tribe: Platycleidini
- Genus: Decticita
- Species: D. brevicauda

Binomial name
- Decticita brevicauda (Caudell, 1907)

Species of cricket-like animal

Decticita brevicauda, the short-winged shieldback, is a species of shield-backed katydid in the family Tettigoniidae. It is found in North America.
