= Idionotus =

Scientific classification
- Domain: Eukaryota
- Kingdom: Animalia
- Phylum: Arthropoda
- Class: Insecta
- Order: Orthoptera
- Suborder: Ensifera
- Family: Tettigoniidae
- Subfamily: Tettigoniinae
- Tribe: Nedubini
- Genus: Idionotus; Scudder, 1894

Genus of cricket-like animals

Idionotus is a genus of shield-backed katydids in the family Tettigoniidae. There are about seven described species in Idionotus.

== Species ==
These seven species belong to the genus Idionotus:

- Idionotus brunneus Scudder, 1901
- Idionotus incurvus Rentz & Birchim, 1968
- Idionotus lundgreni Rentz & Birchim, 1968
- Idionotus similis Caudell, 1934
- Idionotus siskiyou Hebard, 1934 (siskiyou shieldback)
- Idionotus tehachapi Hebard, 1934 (tehachapi shieldback)
- Idionotus tuolumne Hebard, 1934
