= Idionotus siskiyou =

Scientific classification
- Domain: Eukaryota
- Kingdom: Animalia
- Phylum: Arthropoda
- Class: Insecta
- Order: Orthoptera
- Suborder: Ensifera
- Family: Tettigoniidae
- Tribe: Nedubini
- Genus: Idionotus
- Species: I. siskiyou

Binomial name
- Idionotus siskiyou Hebard, 1934

Species of cricket-like animal

Idionotus siskiyou, the siskiyou shieldback, is a species of shield-backed katydid in the family Tettigoniidae. It is found in North America.
