= Apote =

Scientific classification
- Kingdom: Animalia
- Phylum: Arthropoda
- Clade: Pancrustacea
- Class: Insecta
- Order: Orthoptera
- Suborder: Ensifera
- Family: Tettigoniidae
- Subfamily: Tettigoniinae
- Tribe: Tettigoniini
- Genus: Apote; Scudder, 1897

Genus of cricket-like animals

Apote is a genus of shield-backed katydids in the family Tettigoniidae. There are at least two described species in Apote.

== Species ==
These two species belong to the genus Apote:

- Apote notabilis Scudder, 1897 (notable apote)
- Apote robusta Caudell, 1907 (robust apote)
