= Clinopleura melanopleura =

Scientific classification
- Domain: Eukaryota
- Kingdom: Animalia
- Phylum: Arthropoda
- Class: Insecta
- Order: Orthoptera
- Suborder: Ensifera
- Family: Tettigoniidae
- Tribe: Platycleidini
- Genus: Clinopleura
- Species: C. melanopleura

Binomial name
- Clinopleura melanopleura (Scudder, 1876)

Species of cricket-like animal

Clinopleura melanopleura is a species of shield-backed katydid in the family Tettigoniidae. It is found in North America.
