= Clinopleura =

Scientific classification
- Domain: Eukaryota
- Kingdom: Animalia
- Phylum: Arthropoda
- Class: Insecta
- Order: Orthoptera
- Suborder: Ensifera
- Family: Tettigoniidae
- Subfamily: Tettigoniinae
- Tribe: Platycleidini
- Genus: Clinopleura; Scudder, 1894

Genus of cricket-like animals

Clinopleura is a genus of shield-backed katydids in the family Tettigoniidae. There are at least four described species in Clinopleura.

== Species ==
These four species belong to the genus Clinopleura:

- Clinopleura flavomarginata Scudder, 1900
- Clinopleura infuscata Caudell, 1907
- Clinopleura melanopleura (Scudder, 1876)
- Clinopleura minuta Caudell, 1907
