= List of Orthopteroid genera containing species recorded in Europe =

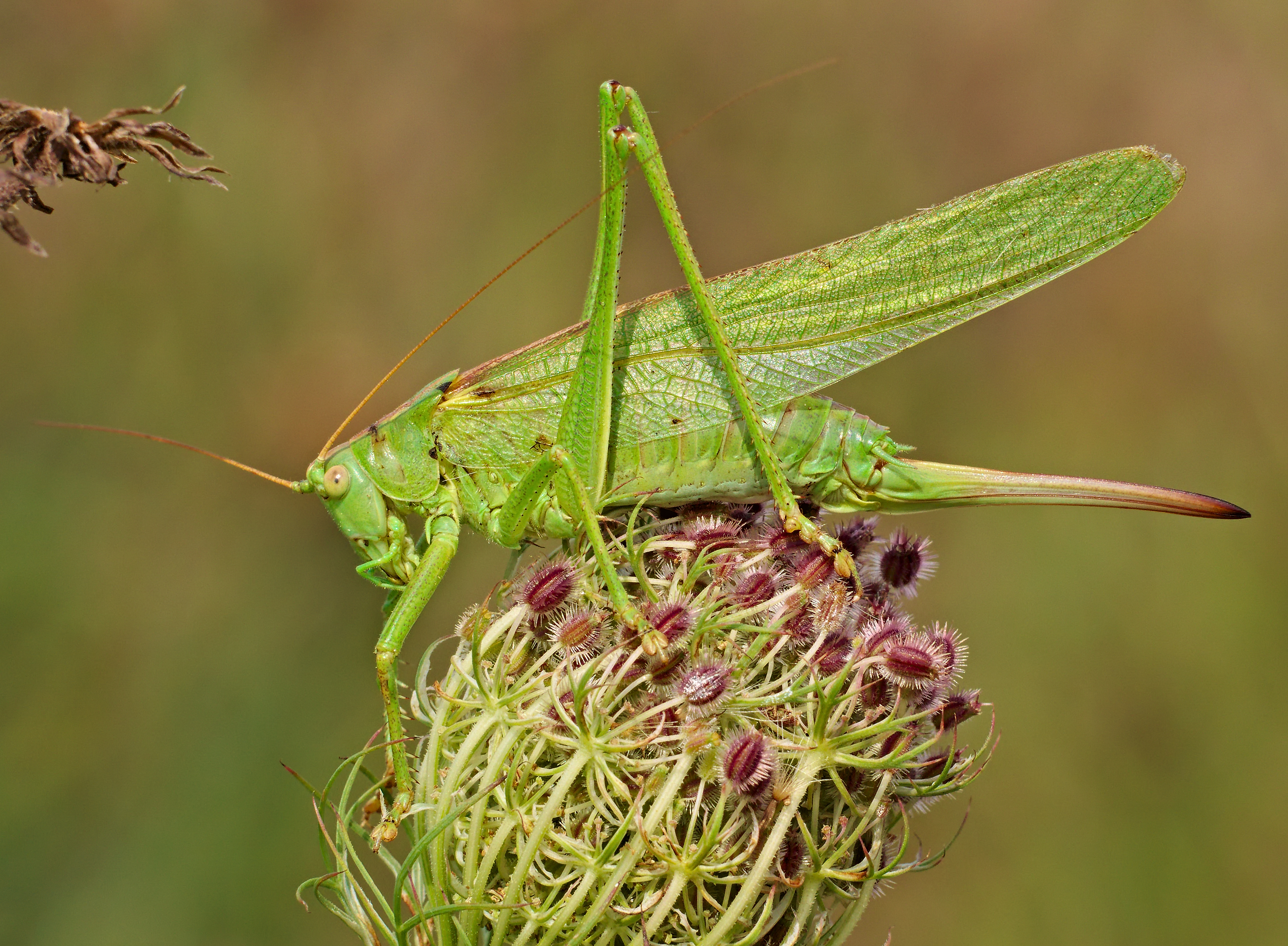
Tettigonia viridissima, female

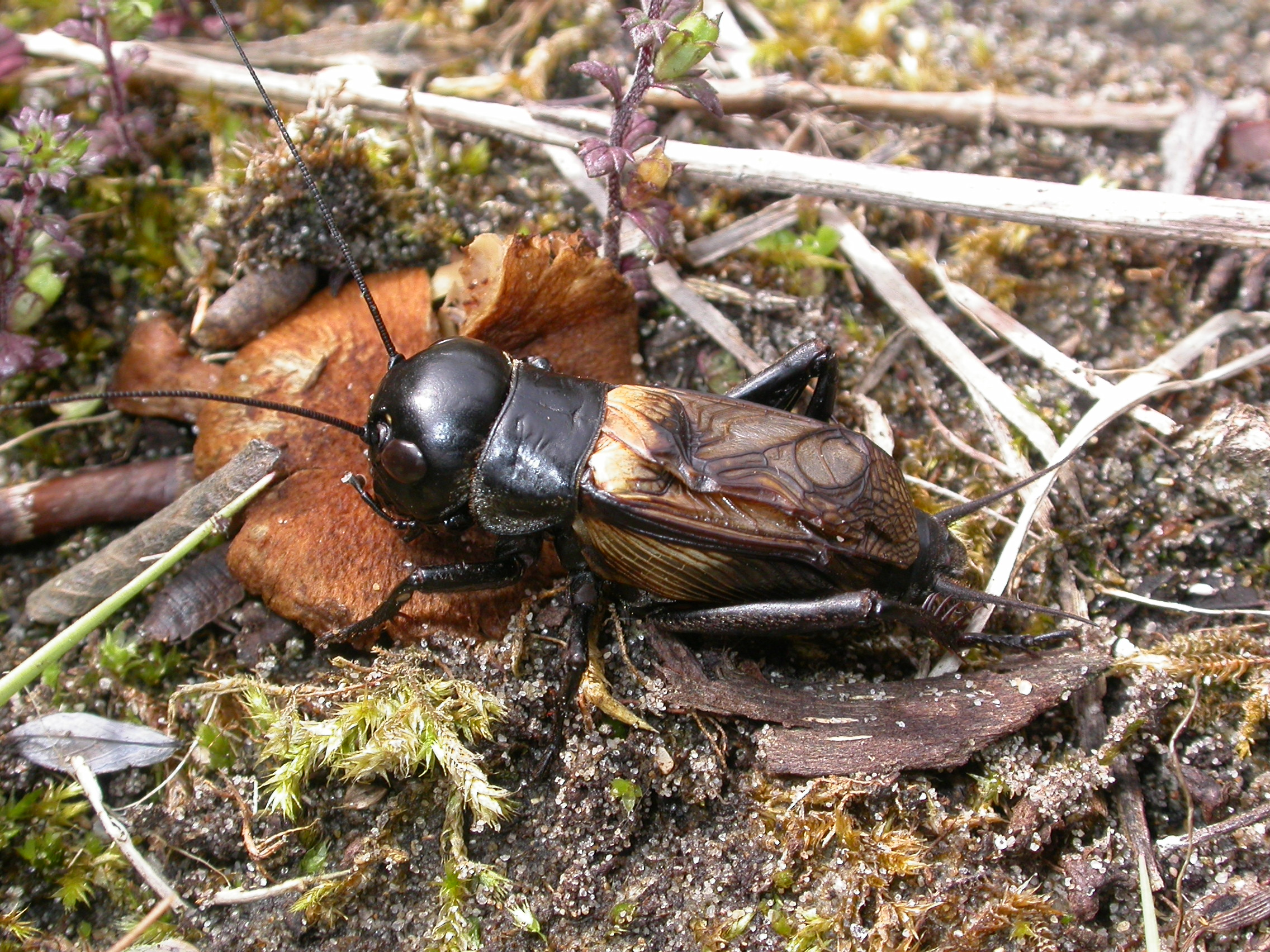
Gryllus campestris male

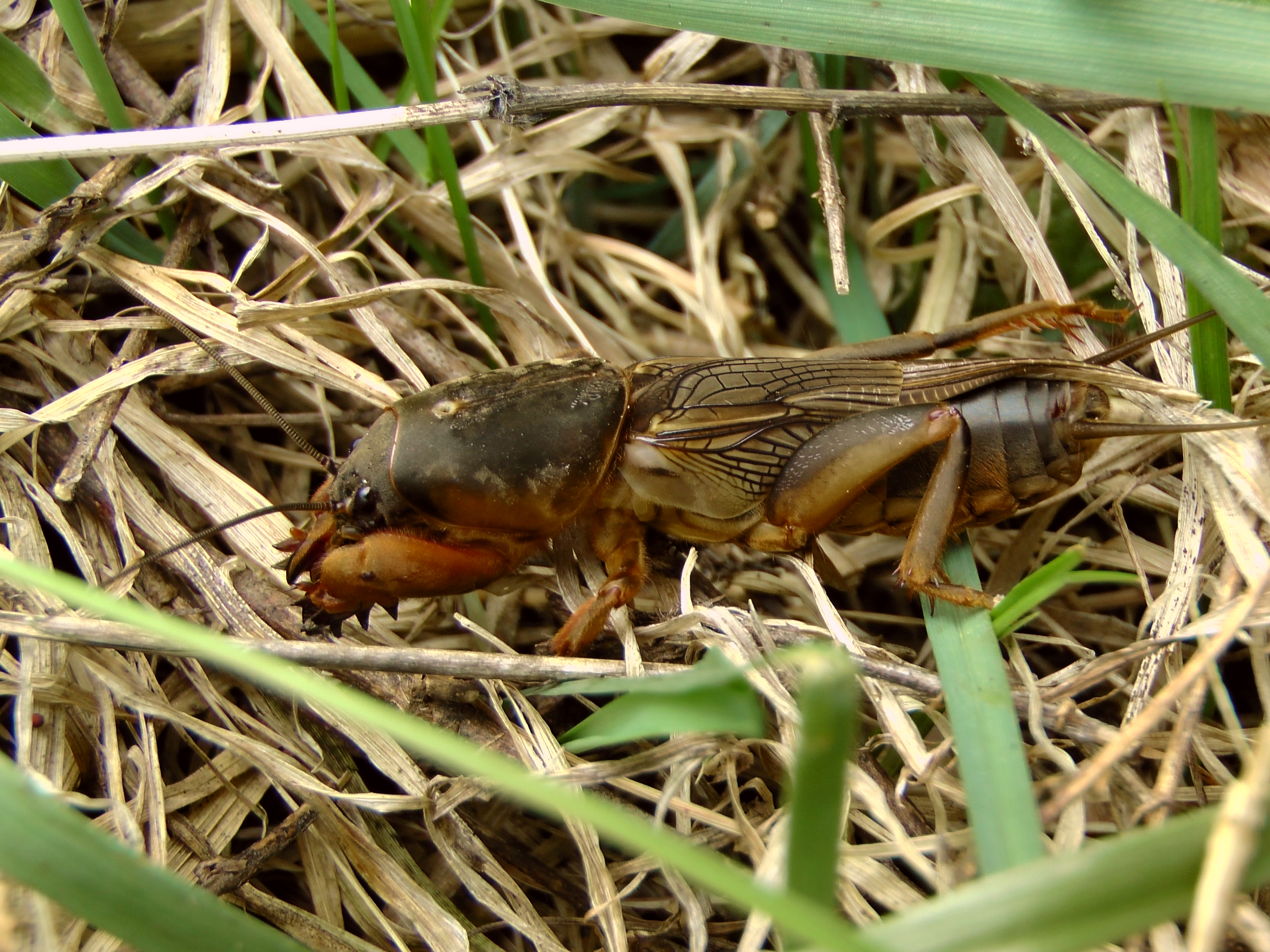
Gryllotalpa gryllotalpa

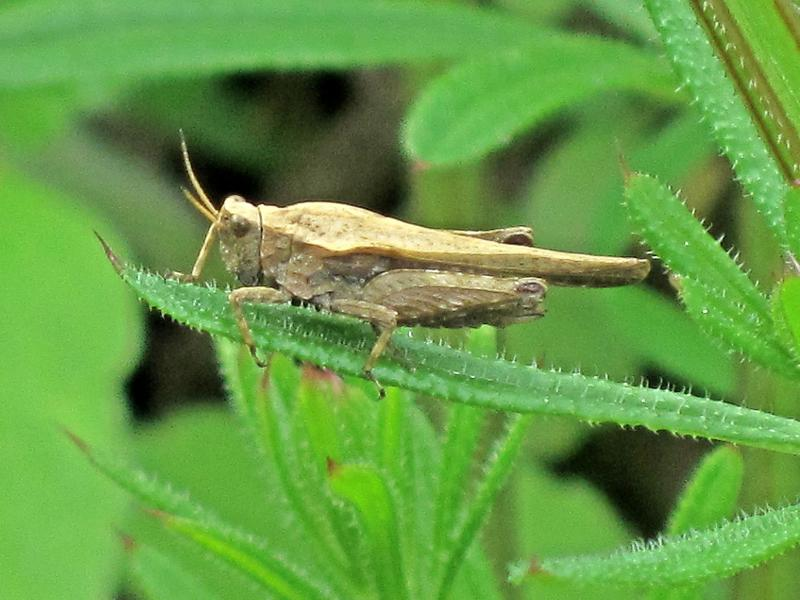
Tetrix subulata

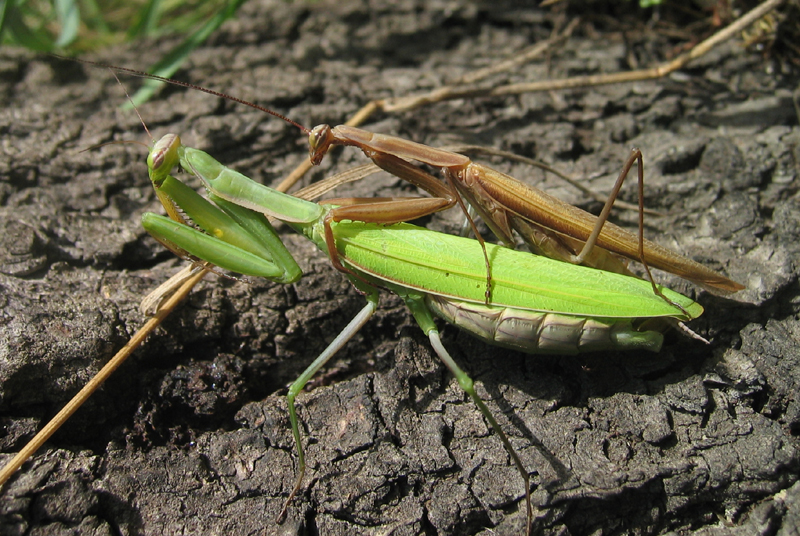
Mantis religiosa, mating pair

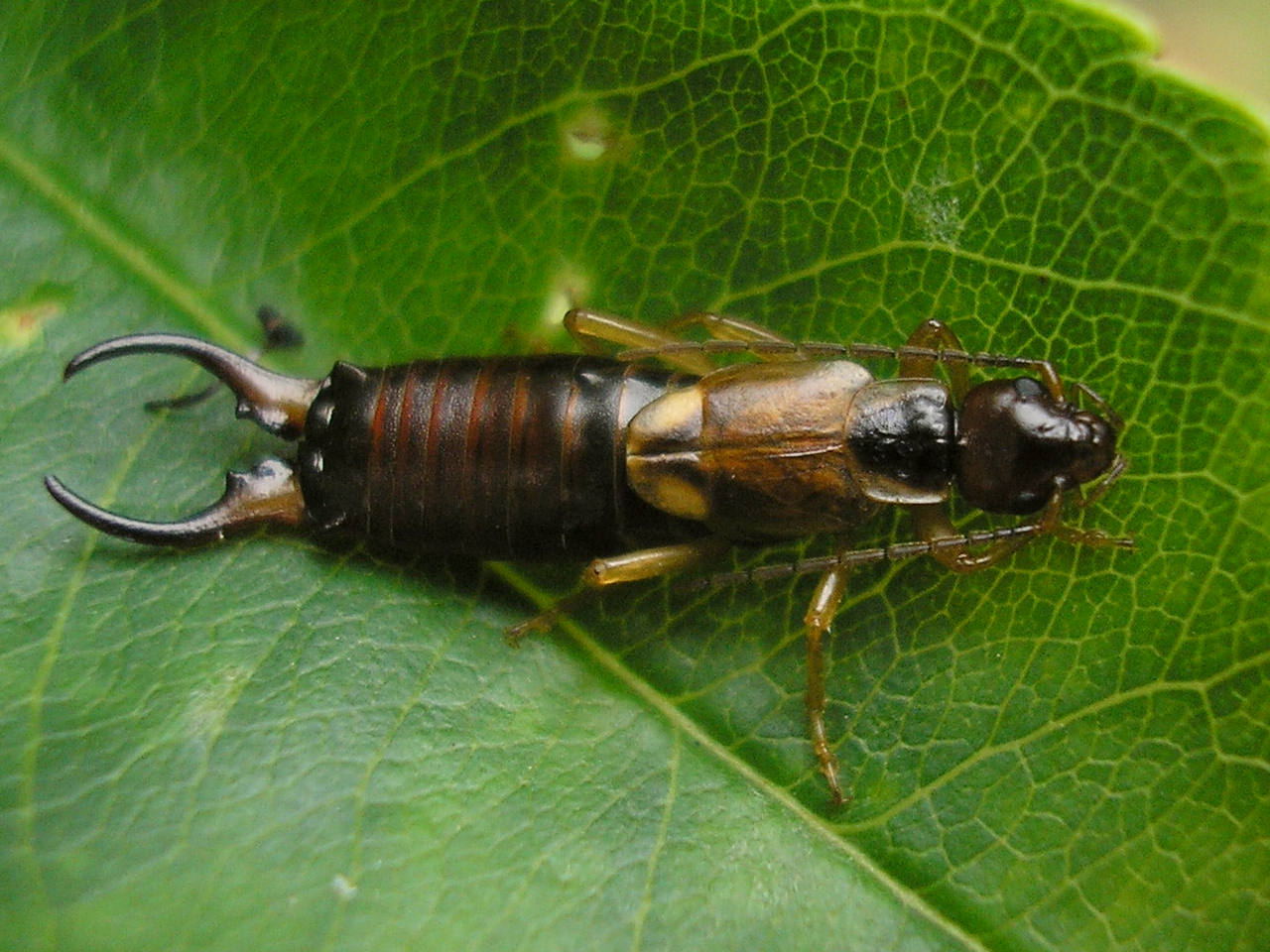
Forficula auricularia male

This list contains extant European genera of the "Orthopteroid" orders (or Polyneoptera) that are often studied and written-about together. With the limited fauna in the British Isles, it is relatively easy to include organisms to species level: as in the list of Orthoptera and allied insects of Great Britain. However, the whole continent - defined here biogeographically as the part of the Palaearctic realm West of the Ural Mountains, including all islands - encompasses a much greater diversity (well over 1000 species) that includes a number of recently erected and little-known genera.

The list may also be of interest outside Europe, since for various historical reasons, the continent is home to the type species of many higher taxa: to family level and above (e.g. Tettigonia viridissima, the great-green bush cricket, is type for its genus, tribe, family and superfamily: the Tettigonoidea).

Searches have been carried out the authoritative Species Files for the following sections of this list:

- Orthoptera sensu stricto including crickets, bush crickets and grasshoppers: and their allies.
- Stick insects
- Praying mantids, native cockroaches and termites
- Earwigs

The focus has been on native species, but some genera marked with a *, may contain species that are probably introduced, cosmopolitan or other vagrant organisms.

== Orthoptera: Ensifera ==
=== Grylloidea (crickets) ===
==== Gryllidae: Gryllinae ====
- Gryllini
1. Acheta Fabricius, 1775
2. Brachytrupes Serville, 1838
3. Gryllodinus Bolívar, 1927
4. Gryllodes Saussure, 1874
5. Gryllus Linnaeus, 1758
6. Melanogryllus Chopard, 1961
7. Svercus - monotypic Svercus palmetorum Gorochov, 1988
8. Tartarogryllus Tarbinsky, 1940
- Modicogryllini
1. Eumodicogryllus Gorochov, 1986
2. Gryllopsis Chopard, 1928
3. Modicogryllus Chopard, 1961
- Sciobiini
1. Sciobia Burmeister, 1838
- Turanogryllini
1. Turanogryllus Tarbinsky, 1940
- Unplaced
1. Grylloderes Bolívar, 1894 - monotypic Grylloderes brunneri (Riggio, 1888)
2. Platygryllus Chopard, 1961

==== Gryllomorphinae ====
- Gryllomorphini
1. Eugryllodes Chopard, 1927
2. Gryllomorpha Fieber, 1853
- Petaloptilini
1. Acroneuroptila Baccetti, 1960
2. Ovaliptila Gorochov, 2006
3. Petaloptila Pantel, 1890

==== Oecanthinae ====
1. Oecanthus Serville, 1831

=== Mogoplistidae ===
- Arachnocephalini
1. Arachnocephalus Costa, 1855
2. Pseudomogoplistes Gorochov, 1984
- Mogoplistini
1. Mogoplistes Serville, 1838
2. Paramogoplistes Gorochov, 1984

=== Trigonidiidae ===
1. Natula Gorochov, 1987
2. Trigonidium Rambur, 1838

Nemobiinae

1. Nemobius Serville, 1838
2. Pteronemobius Jacobson, 1904
3. Stenonemobius Gorochov, 1981

=== Gryllotalpoidea ===
1. Gryllotalpa Latreille, 1802
2. Myrmecophilus Berthold, 1827

=== Rhaphidophoroidea ===
1. Dolichopoda Bolivar, 1880
2. Tachycines Adelung, 1902* (Asian origin)
3. Troglophilus Krauss, 1879

=== Tettigoniidae ===
==== Bradyporinae ====
- Bradyporini
1. Bradyporus Charpentier, 1825
2. Pycnogaster Graells, 1851
- Ephippigerini
1. Albarracinia Barat, 2012 (monotypic)
2. Baetica ustulata (monotypic)
3. Baratia sari Llucià Pomares, 2021 (monotypic)
4. Callicrania Bolívar, 1898
5. Coracinotus Barat, 2012
6. Corsteropleurus Barat, 2012 (monotypic)
7. Ephippiger Berthold, 1827
8. Ephippigerida Bolivar, 1903
9. Lucasinova Barat, 2012
10. Lluciapomaresius Barat, 2012
11. Neocallicrania Pfau, 1996
12. Parasteropleurus Barat, 2012
13. Platystolus Bolívar, 1878
14. Sabaterpia Barat, 2012
15. Sorapagus Barat, 2012 (monotypic)
16. Steropleurus Bolívar, 1878
17. Synephippius Navás, 1905 (monotypic)
18. Uromenus Bolívar, 1878

==== Conocephalinae ====
1. Conocephalus Thunberg, 1815
2. Ruspolia Schulthess Schindler, 1898

==== Phaneropterinae ====
- Acrometopini
1. Acrometopa Fieber, 1853
- Barbitistini
1. Ancistrura Uvarov, 1921
2. Andreiniimon Capra, 1937 A. nuptialis
3. Barbitistes Charpentier, 1825
4. Isophya Brunner von Wattenwyl, 1878
5. Leptophyes Fieber, 1853
6. Metaplastes (Ramme, 1939)
7. Poecilimon Fischer, 1853
8. Polysarcus Fischer, 1853
- Odonturini
1. Odontura Rambur, 1838
2. Odonturella Bolívar, 1900
- Phaneropterini
1. Phaneroptera Serville, 1831
- Tylopsidini
1. Tylopsis Fieber, 1853

==== Meconematinae ====
- Meconematini
1. Canariola Uvarov, 1940
2. Meconema Serville, 1831
3. Cyrtaspis Fischer, 1853
4. Phlugiolopsis Zeuner, 1940

==== Saginae ====
1. Saga Charpentier, 1825

==== Tettigoniinae ====
- Ctenodecticini
1. Ctenodecticus Bolívar, 1877
2. Miramiola Uvarov, 1939
- Drymadusini
1. Anadrymadusa Karabag, 1961
2. Drymadusa Stein, 1860
3. Paradrymadusa Herman, 1874
- Decticini
1. Decticus Serville, 1831
- Gampsocleidini
1. Gampsocleis Fieber, 1852
- Onconotini
1. Onconotus Fischer von Waldheim, 1839
- Pholidopterini
1. Eupholidoptera Maran, 1953
2. Parapholidoptera Maran, 1953
3. Pholidoptera Wesmaël, 1838
4. Psorodonotus Brunner von Wattenwyl, 1861

Platycleidini

- genus group Metrioptera Zeuner, 1941
1. Bicolorana Zeuner, 1941
2. Metrioptera Wesmaël, 1838
3. Roeseliana Zeuner, 1941
4. Zeuneriana Ramme, 1951
- genus group Platycleis Brunner von Wattenwyl, 1893
1. Incertana Zeuner, 1941
2. Montana Zeuner, 1941
3. Parnassiana Zeuner, 1941
4. Platycleis Fieber, 1853
5. Sepiana Zeuner, 1941 - monotypic S. sepium (Yersin, 1854)
6. Sporadiana Zeuner, 1941 - monotypic S. sporadarum (Werner, 1933)
7. Tessellana Zeuner, 1941
- Other tribe Platycleidini
1. Amedegnatiana Massa & Fontana, 2011
2. Anonconotus Camerano, 1878
3. Antaxius Brunner von Wattenwyl, 1882
4. Anterastes Brunner von Wattenwyl, 1882
5. Bucephaloptera Ebner, 1923
6. Broughtonia Harz, 1969
7. Koroglus Ünal, 2002
8. Modestana Beier, 1955
9. Pachytrachis Uvarov, 1940
10. Pterolepis Rambur, 1838
11. Rhacocleis Fieber, 1853
12. Sardoplatycleis Massa & Fontana, 2011 - monotypic S. galvagnii (Fontana, Buzzetti, Kleukers & Odé, 2011)
13. Vichetia Harz, 1969
14. Yersinella Ramme, 1933

Tettigoniini

1. Amphiestris Fieber, 1853
2. Tettigonia Linnaeus, 1758
3. Thyreonotus Serville, 1838

== Orthoptera: Caelifera ==
=== Acrididae: Acridinae ===
1. Acrida Linnaeus, 1758
2. Calephorus Fieber, 1853
3. Duroniella Bolívar, 1908
4. Truxalis Fabricius, 1775

=== Calliptaminae ===
1. Calliptamus Serville, 1831
2. Paracaloptenus Bolívar, 1876

=== Cyrtacanthacridinae ===
1. Anacridium Uvarov, 1923
2. Schistocerca Stål, 1873

=== Eyprepocnemidinae etc. ===
1. Eyprepocnemis Stål, 1873
2. Heteracris Walker, 1870

Egnatinae

1. Egnatius - Egnatius apicalis (monotypic) Stål, 1876

Pezotettiginae

1. Pezotettix Burmeister, 1840

=== Gomphocerinae ===
- Arcypterini
1. Arcyptera Serville, 1838
- Chrysochraontini
1. Chrysochraon Fischer, 1853
2. Euchorthippus Tarbinsky, 1926
3. Euthystira Fieber, 1852
4. Podismopsis Zubovski, 1900
- Dociostaurini
1. Dociostaurus Fieber, 1853
2. Eremippus Uvarov, 1926
3. Notostaurus Bey-Bienko, 1933
4. Xerohippus Uvarov, 1942
- Gomphocerini
1. Aeropedellus Hebard, 1935
2. Chorthippus Fieber, 1852
3. Gomphoceridius Bolívar, 1914
4. Gomphocerippus Roberts, 1941
5. Gomphocerus Thunberg, 1816
6. Mesasippus Tarbinsky, 1931
7. Myrmeleotettix Bolívar, 1914
8. Pseudochorthippus Defaut, 2012
- Ochrilidiini
1. Ochrilidia Stål, 1873
- Stenobothrini
1. Omocestus Bolívar, 1878
2. Stenobothrus Fischer, 1853
- incertae sedis
1. Brachycrotaphus Krauss, 1877
2. Italohippus Fontana & La Greca, 1999
3. Rammeihippus Woznessenskij, 1996
4. Ramburiella Bolívar, 1906
5. Stauroderus Bolívar, 1897

=== Melanoplinae ===
Podismini

1. Bohemanella Ramme, 1951 monotypic
2. Capraiuscola Galvagni, 1986
3. Chortopodisma Ramme, 1951
4. Cophopodisma Dovnar-Zapolskij, 1932
5. Epipodisma Ramme, 1951 monotypic E. pedemontana (Brunner von Wattenwyl, 1882)
6. Italopodisma Harz, 1973
7. Micropodisma Dovnar-Zapolskij, 1932
8. Miramella Dovnar-Zapolskij, 1932
9. Nadigella Galvagni, 1986 monotypic N. formosanta (Fruhstorfer, 1921)
10. Odontopodisma Dovnar-Zapolskij, 1932
11. Oropodisma Uvarov, 1942
12. Peripodisma Willemse, 1972
13. Podisma Berthold, 1827
14. Pseudopodisma Mistshenko, 1947
15. Pseudoprumna Dovnar-Zapolskij, 1932 monotypic P. baldensis (Krauss, 1883)
16. Zubovskya Dovnar-Zapolskij, 1932

=== Oedipodinae ===
- Acrotylini
1. Acrotylus Fieber, 1853
- Bryodemini
1. Bryodemella Yin, 1982
- Epacromiini
1. Aiolopus Fieber, 1853
2. Epacromius Uvarov, 1942
3. Paracinema Fischer, 1853
4. Platypygius Uvarov, 1942
- Locustini
1. Locusta Linnaeus, 1758 (monotypic)
2. Oedaleus Fieber, 1853
3. Psophus Fieber, 1853 monotypic Psophus stridulus
4. Pyrgodera Fischer von Waldheim, 1846
- Oedipodini
1. Celes Saussure, 1884
2. Oedipoda Latreille, 1829
- Parapleurini
1. Mecostethus Fieber, 1852
2. Stethophyma Fischer, 1853
- Sphingonotini
1. Sphingoderus Bei-Bienko, 1950
2. Sphingonotus Fieber, 1852
- Unplaced
1. Leptopternis Saussure, 1884
2. Morphacris Walker, 1870

Tropidopolinae

1. Tropidopola Stål, 1873

=== Dericorythidae ===
1. Dericorys Serville, 1838

=== Pamphagidae ===
- Euryparyphini
1. Euryparyphes Fischer, 1853
- Nocarodeini
1. Nocaracris Uvarov, 1928
2. Paranocarodes Bolívar, 1916
- Pamphagini
1. Acinipe Rambur, 1838
2. Eumigus Bolívar, 1878
3. Kurtharzia Koçak, 1981
4. Ocneridia Bolívar, 1912
5. Ocnerodes Brunner von Wattenwyl, 1882
6. Orchamus Stål, 1876
7. Pamphagus Thunberg, 1815

Thrinchinae
Thrinchini

1. Asiotmethis Uvarov, 1943
2. Glyphanus Fieber, 1853
3. Glyphotmethis Bey-Bienko, 1951
4. Prionotropis Fieber, 1853

=== Pyrgomorphidae ===
1. Pyrgomorpha Serville, 1838
2. Pyrgomorphula Kevan & Akbar, 1963

=== Tetrigidae ===
1. Paratettix Bolívar, 1887
2. Tetrix Latreille, 1802

=== Tridactylidae ===
1. Bruntridactylus Günther, 1979
2. Xya Latreille, 1809

== Phasmida ==
- Phasmatidae: Phasmatinae
1. Acanthoxyla Uvarov 1955 (* New Zealand)
- Bacillidae: Bacillinae: tribe Bacillini
1. Bacillus Berthold, 1827 (2 European spp.)
2. Clonopsis Stål, 1875
- tribe Gratidiini
1. Leptynia Pantel, 1890
2. Pijnackeria Scali, 2009

== Superorder Dictyoptera ==
=== Mantodea ===
- Amorphoscelididae
  - Perlamantis Guérin-Méneville, 1843
- Amelidae
  - Ameles Burmeister, 1838
  - Apteromantis Werner, 1931 Apteromantis aptera
- Empusidae
  - Blepharopsis mendica (Fabricius, 1775) - monotypic: Cyprus, Turkey
  - Empusa Illiger, 1798
- Mantidae
  - Mantis religiosa (Linnaeus, 1758)
  - Iris oratoria (Linnaeus, 1758)
- Thespidae
  - Oligonicella Giglio-Tos, 1915

=== Blattodea (native cockroaches and termites) ===
Corydiidae

- Corydiinae
  - Hemelytroblatta Chopard, 1929
  - Polyphaga Brullé, 1835

Ectobiidae

- Blattellinae
  - Loboptera Brunner von Wattenwyl, 1865
- Ectobiinae
  - Capraiellus Harz, 1976
  - Dziriblatta Chopard, 1936
  - Ectobius Stephens, 1835
  - Luridiblatta Fernandes, 1965: Luridiblatta trivittata (Serville, 1838)
  - Phyllodromica Fieber, 1853
  - Planuncus Bohn, 2013
- Pseudophyllodromiinae
  - Chorisoblatta: mostly African genus includes Chorisoblatta insularis (Saussure, 1869) - Mauritius

Isoptera (termites)

- Rhinotermitidae
  - Reticulitermes Holmgren, 1913

== Dermaptera ==
=== Anisolabididae ===
Anisolabidinae

- Anisolabis Fieber, 1853 (mostly Asian): Anisolabis maritima* is cosmopolitan
- Euborellia Burr, 1910: Euborellia moesta is a southern European species; Euborellia annulipes* is cosmopolitan

=== Forficulidae ===
Allodahliinae

- Eulithinus Hincks, 1935

Anechurinae

- Anechura Scudder, 1876
- Chelidura Latreille, 1825
- Chelidurella Verhoeff, 1902
- Mesochelidura Verhoeff, 1902
- Pseudochelidura Verhoeff, 1902

Forficulinae

- Apterygida Westwood, 1840
- Forficula Linnaeus, 1758 e.g. Forficula auricularia
- Guanchia Burr, 1911

=== Labiduridae ===
- Labidura Leach, 1815 e.g. Labidura riparia* is cosmopolitan
- Nala Zacher, 1910

=== Spongiphoridae ===
Isolaboidinae

- Isolaboides Hincks, 1958

Labiinae

- Isolabella Verhoeff, 1902
- Labia Leach, 1815 e.g. Labia minor
- Paralabella Steinmann, 1989 (in some sources treated as Paralabellula Kevan, 1991)

Spongiphorinae

- Marava Burr, 1911 (synonym Prolabia): Marava arachidis (Yersin, 1860) * (mostly S. American)
