= Corsteropleurus =

Scientific classification
- Kingdom: Animalia
- Phylum: Arthropoda
- Clade: Pancrustacea
- Class: Insecta
- Order: Orthoptera
- Suborder: Ensifera
- Family: Tettigoniidae
- Subfamily: Bradyporinae
- Tribe: Ephippigerini
- Genus: Corsteropleurus; Barat, 2012
- Species: C. chopardi

Binomial name
- Corsteropleurus chopardi (Ebner, 1938)

Synonyms
- Steropleurus elegans Chopard, 1924; Steropleurus chopardi Ebner, 1938

Genus and species of bush crickets

Corsteropleurus is a monotypic genus of bush crickets, erected by J. Barat in 2012, as part of a revision of the tribe Ephippigerini.

== Species ==
To date (2026), this genus contains the single species Corsteropleurus chopardi (Ebner, 1938), from Corsica and known as the Corsican Saddle Bush-cricket (L'Ephippigère corse). The original type specimen was deposited in the Museum National d'Histoire Naturelle (MNHN), Paris by Lucien Chopard as Steropleurus elegans Chopard, 1924, but placing a genus has proved problematical; another specimen was subsequently named after him as S. chopardi, with other authorities placing this insect in genus Uromenus before Barat's (2012) review.

== See also ==
- List of Orthopteroid genera containing species recorded in Europe
- Data related to Ephippigerini at Wikispecies
- Images at iNaturalist
