= Albarracinia =

Scientific classification
- Kingdom: Animalia
- Phylum: Arthropoda
- Clade: Pancrustacea
- Class: Insecta
- Order: Orthoptera
- Suborder: Ensifera
- Family: Tettigoniidae
- Subfamily: Bradyporinae
- Tribe: Ephippigerini
- Genus: Albarracinia; Barat, 2012
- Species: A. zapaterii

Binomial name
- Albarracinia zapaterii (Bolívar, 1877)

Synonyms
- Ephippigerida zapatari [sic] (Bolívar, 1877)

Genus and species of bush crickets

Albarracinia is a monotypic genus of bush crickets, erected by J. Barat in 2012 as part of a revision of the tribe Ephippigerini.

== Species ==
To date (2026), this genus contains the single species Albarracinia zapaterii (Bolívar, 1877), found in Spain. It is endemic there and was previously known under its original placement by Ignacio Bolívar as "Ephippigerida zapatari" (Bolívar, 1877).

== See also ==
- List of Orthopteroid genera containing species recorded in Europe
- Data related to Ephippigerini at Wikispecies
- Images at iNaturalist
