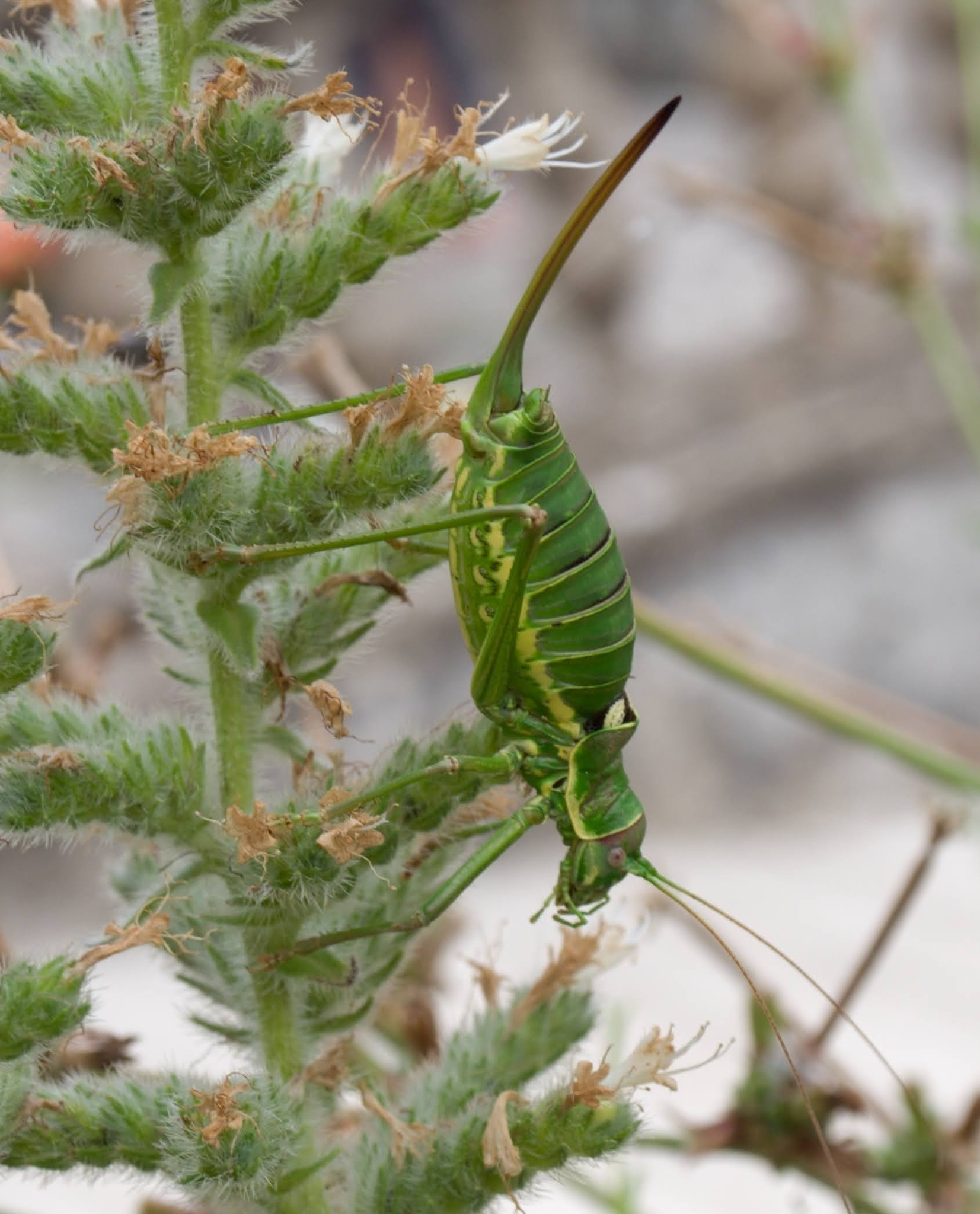
- Dinarippiger discoidalis in Zaostrog, Croatia

Scientific classification
- Kingdom: Animalia
- Phylum: Arthropoda
- Clade: Pancrustacea
- Class: Insecta
- Order: Orthoptera
- Suborder: Ensifera
- Family: Tettigoniidae
- Subfamily: Bradyporinae
- Tribe: Ephippigerini
- Genus: Dinarippiger; Skejo, Kasalo, Fontana & Tvrtković, 2023
- Species: D. discoidalis

Binomial name
- Dinarippiger discoidalis (Fieber, 1853)

Synonyms
- Ephippiger discoidalis Fieber, 1853; Ephippigera selenophora Fieber, 1853; Ephippigera limbata Fischer, 1853; Ephippigera sphacophila Krauss, 1879; Ephippigera dalmatica Kollar, in litt.

= Dinarippiger =

Genus of bush-crickets

Dinarippiger discoidalis, commonly known as the Dalmatian saddle bush-cricket, is a species of bush-cricket in the tribe Ephippigerini. It is the only species in the genus Dinarippiger. The species was originally described by Fieber in 1853 as Ephippiger discoidalis, but was transferred to a new genus in 2023 based on morphological, bioacoustic, and biogeographic evidence.

== Description ==
Dinarippiger is distinguished from the related genus Ephippiger by the following characters: red coloration of the occiput directly adjacent to the prozona of the pronotum (black in Ephippiger); basal color of the tegmina black with a wide white line just anterior to the caudal margin (uniformly brown in Ephippiger); cerci with a bilobate tip, the inner lobe almost as developed as the outer one (outer lobe more developed in Ephippiger); and a shorter, less elevated metazona of the pronotum. From Uromenus, the new genus differs by the bright red occiput (blue, yellow, orange, or reddish but never vivid red in Uromenus); a large visible portion of the tegmina (mostly covered by the pronotum in Uromenus); tegmina with numerous small black dots on the dorsal margin forming a continuous black line (large black dots separated by white areas in Uromenus); and a typically long, straight ovipositor (short and decurved in Uromenus). Males have a trapezoidal, bilobate epiproct, while Uromenus and Ephippiger males have a rounded or square epiproct, rarely weakly bilobate. Abdominal tergites typically have black and white markings, which are absent in Uromenus and Ephippiger.

Dinarippiger discoidalis is a highly variable species in color and size. Individuals range from green to brownish, with coastal and island populations often differing from montane ones. The species exhibits a vivid red coloration of the occiput directly adjacent to the pronotum, present in all nymphal instars except the earliest. The male calling song consists of echemes containing 3–7 syllables (rarely 1–2), with a frequency spectrum peaking in the ultrasound around 20 to 40 kHz.

== Distribution and ecology ==
The Dalmatian saddle bush-cricket inhabits the karstic regions of the Dinaric Alps in Italy (Friuli-Venezia Giulia), Slovenia, Croatia, Bosnia & Herzegovina, Montenegro, and Albania. Its distribution extends from Monte Cavallo in the west to Albania in the south, and from the Adriatic coast to the Dinaric mountains up to about 1,700 m above sea level.

The species occupies dry karstic Illyrian meadows in early succession with individual bushes (e.g., Juniperus communis), rocky eu-Mediterranean and sub-Mediterranean scrubland, forest margins, and open meadows with tall herbs. Individuals prefer taller herbs such as Gentiana lutea, Eryngium spp., and Clematis alba; shrubs like Juniperus spp. and Rubus spp.; and low-grown Crataegus spp.

Nymphs appear at the end of April and can be observed in high numbers by the end of June, when adults begin to prevail. The peak of activity is in July and August, decreasing by the end of September. Adults occur earlier on the coast and Adriatic islands, and later on higher Dinaric mountains. A few adult females can be observed as late as October.

== Etymology ==
The generic name Dinarippiger derives from "Dinara", the mountain between Croatia and Bosnia & Herzegovina after which the Dinaric Alps were named, and "Ephippiger", the genus to which the type species had previously belonged. The word "ephippiger" originates from the Ancient Greek ἐφίππιον (ephippion), meaning saddle, and the suffix "-ger" meaning "bearing". The species is commonly known as the Dalmatian saddle bush-cricket, with vernacular names including crvenoglava sedlarka or krška sedlarka in Croatian, kraška sedlarka in Slovenian, and Efippigera dalmatica in Italian.

== Taxonomy and phylogeny ==
The genus Dinarippiger was erected in 2023 following a comprehensive review of the tribe Ephippigerini. Morphological differences in coloration, tegmina structure, male terminalia, and ovipositor shape, combined with distinct bioacoustic and biogeographic patterns, supported the separation of Ephippiger discoidalis into its own genus. The Apennine peninsula is thought to be the center of dispersal for the genus Ephippiger, while Dinarippiger likely originated in the Dinaric karst, possibly during the elevation of the Dinaric Alps (30–20 million years ago) or during the Messinian salinity crisis (6–5 million years ago). The species does not hybridize with sympatric Ephippiger species in areas where their distributions overlap in Slovenia, Croatia, Bosnia & Herzegovina, and Montenegro.
