= Coracinotus =

Scientific classification
- Domain: Eukaryota
- Kingdom: Animalia
- Phylum: Arthropoda
- Class: Insecta
- Order: Orthoptera
- Suborder: Ensifera
- Family: Tettigoniidae
- Subfamily: Bradyporinae
- Tribe: Ephippigerini
- Genus: Coracinotus; Barat, 2012

Genus of cricket-like animals

External image
- Images at iNaturalist

Coracinotus is a genus of European bush crickets in the tribe Ephippigerini, first described by J. Barat in 2012. To date (2023) species have only been recorded from the Iberian Peninsula.

== Species ==
Barranco & Gómez (2014) provide a key to the species of Coracinotus. The Orthoptera Species File lists:

1. Coracinotus notarioi (Gómez, Pardo & Llorente del Moral, 1998) - type species (as Steropleurus notarioi Gómez, Pardo & Llorente del Moral)
2. Coracinotus politus (Bolívar, 1901)
3. Coracinotus presai Barranco & Gómez, 2014
4. Coracinotus squamiferus (Bolívar, 1907)
