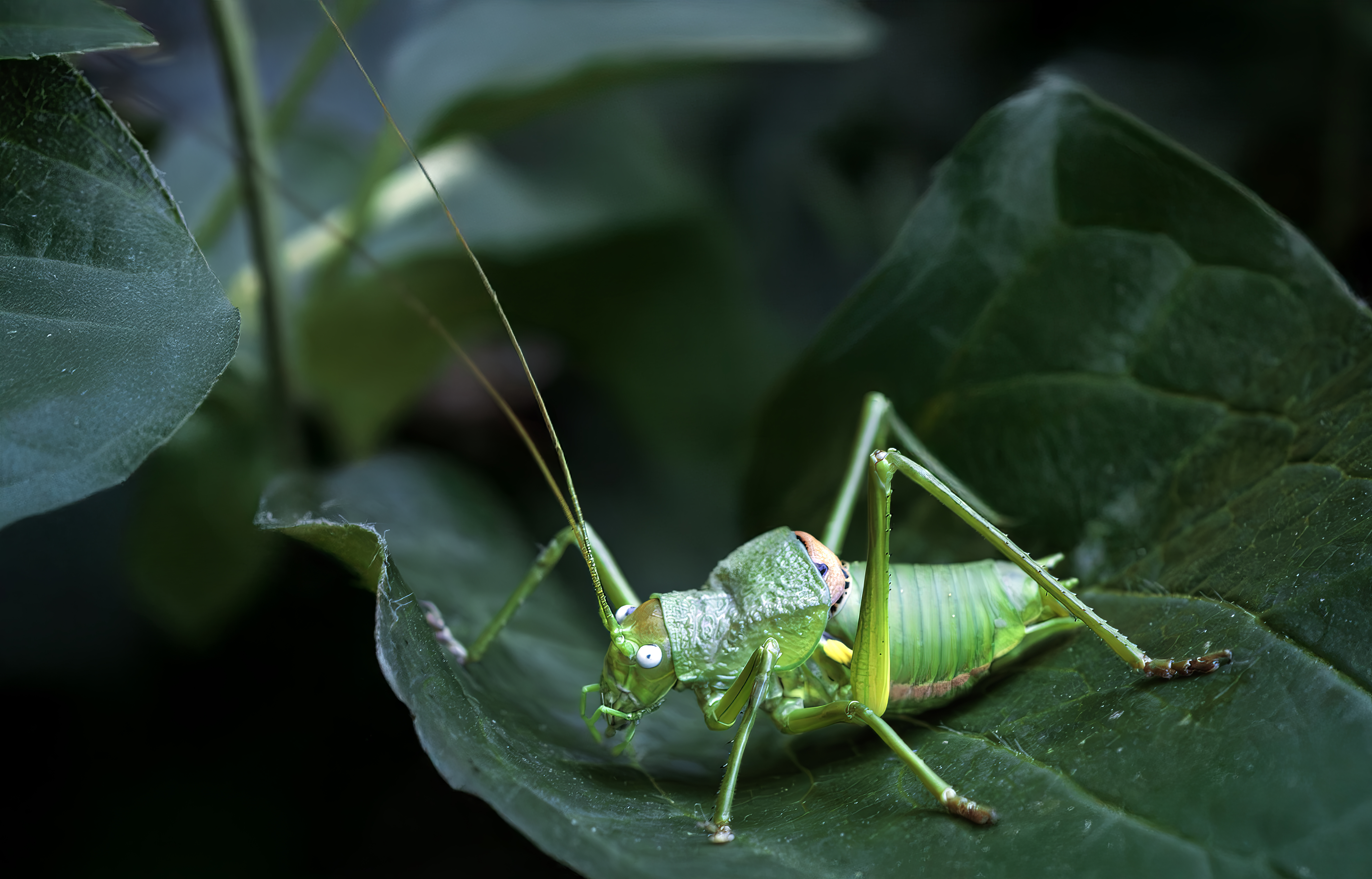
- Uromenus rugosicollis ♂
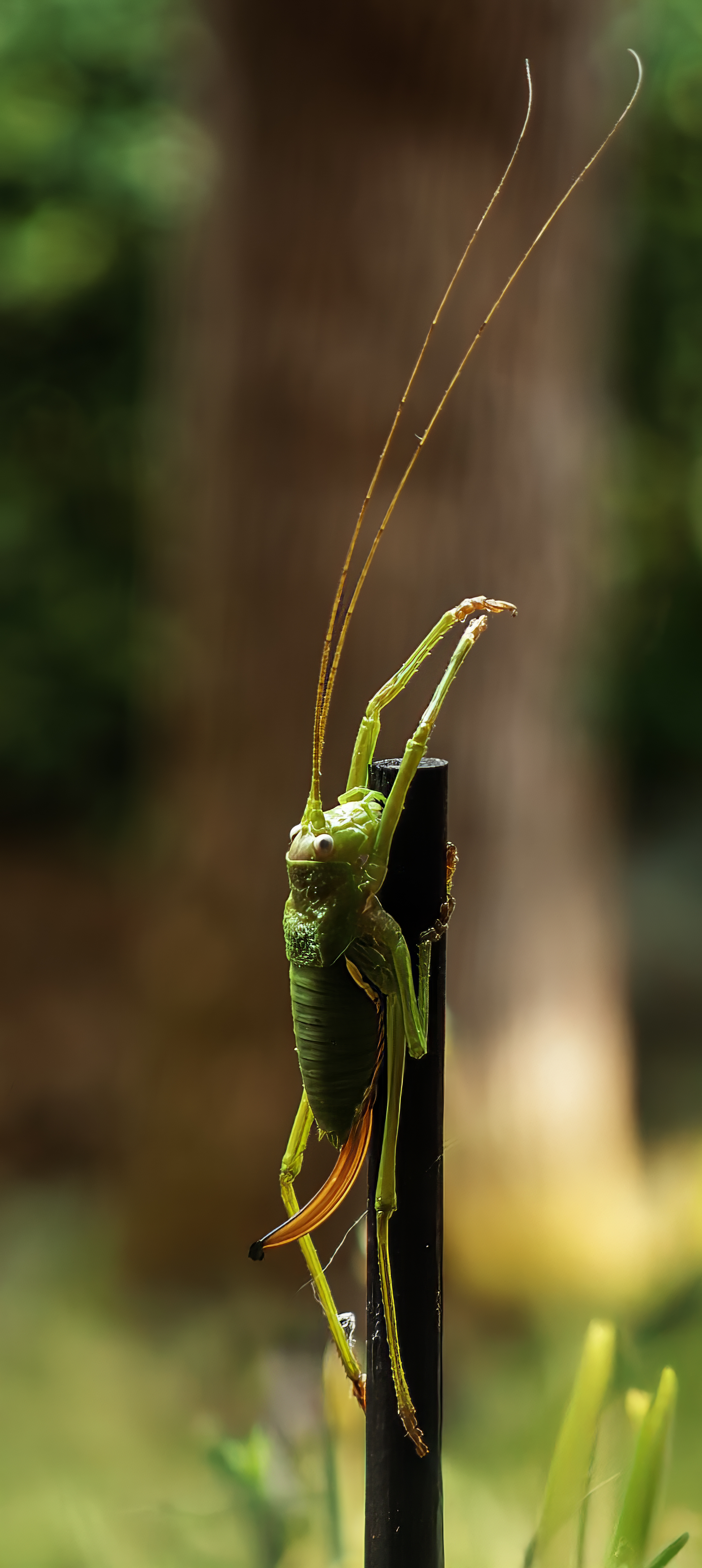
- Uromenus rugosicollis ♀

Scientific classification
- Kingdom: Animalia
- Phylum: Arthropoda
- Clade: Pancrustacea
- Class: Insecta
- Order: Orthoptera
- Suborder: Ensifera
- Family: Tettigoniidae
- Genus: Uromenus
- Species: U. rugosicollis

Binomial name
- Uromenus rugosicollis (Serville, 1839)

= Uromenus rugosicollis =

Species of cricket-like animal

Uromenus rugosicollis is the type species in its genus of bush crickets, belonging to the subfamily Bradyporinae. It is found in Spain and the southern France.

They also exist in the north of Portugal. It has been found north of the Douro River, mainly on hot summer nights.
