= Zichya =

Zichya may refer to two living genera:

- Zichya, an insect in the family Tettigoniidae
- Zichya a synonym for Kennedia, an evergreen plant endemic to Australia;
