= Synephippius =

Scientific classification
- Missing taxonomy template (fix): Synephippius
- Species: Template:Taxonomy/SynephippiusS. obvius

Binomial name
- Template:Taxonomy/SynephippiusSynephippius obvius (Navás, 1904)

Genus and species of bush crickets

Synephippius is a monotypic genus of bush crickets in the tribe Ephippigerini, erected by L. Navás in 1905.

== Species ==
To date (2026), this genus contains the single species Synephippius obvius (Navás, 1904), known as the Exposed Saddle Bush-cricket (and which Navás had originally placed in the similar genus Platystolus). It is endemic to the Pyrenees mountain range between 500-2100 m.

== See also ==
- List of Orthopteroid genera containing species recorded in Europe
- Data related to Ephippigerini at Wikispecies
- Images at iNaturalist
