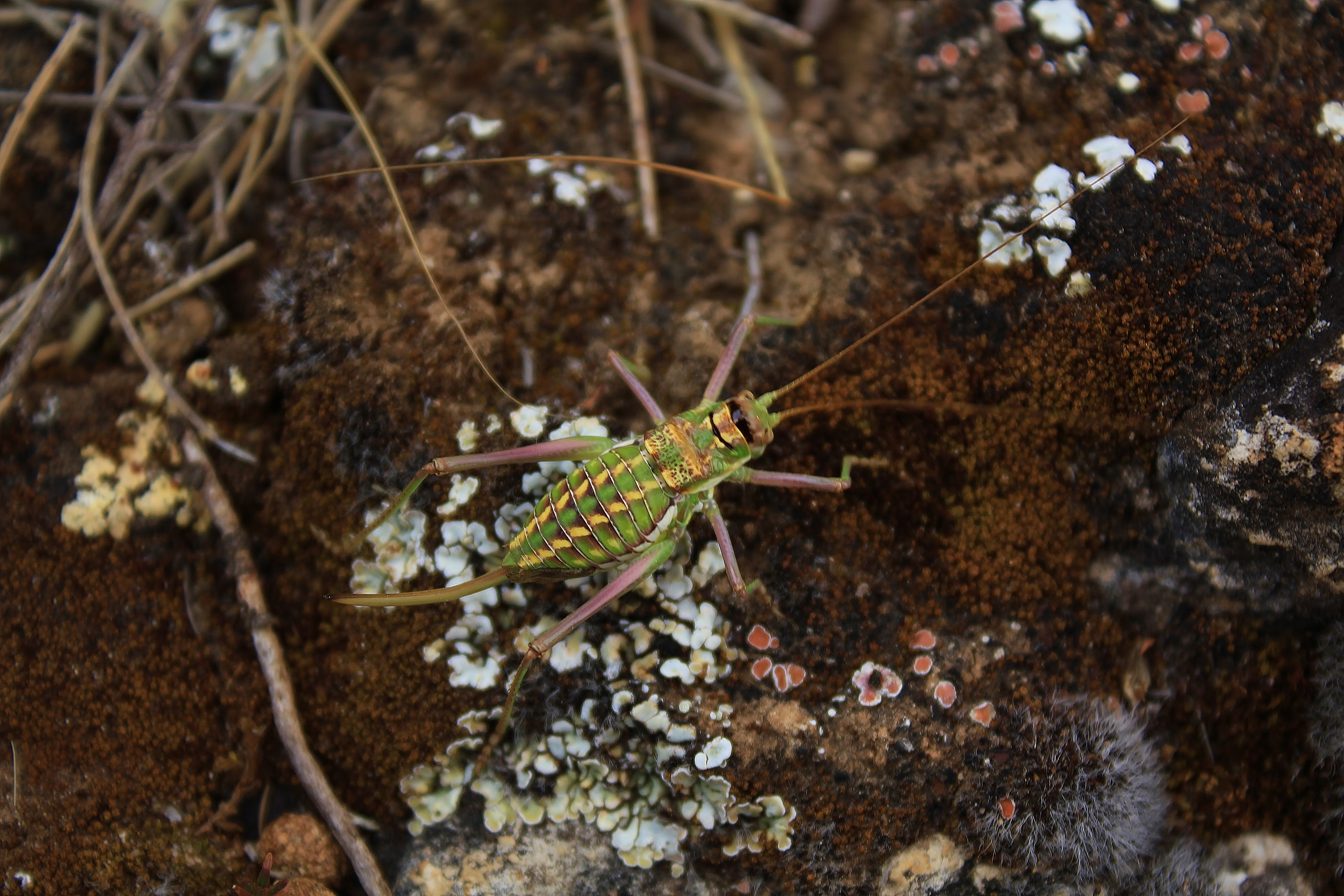
- Parasteropleurus martorelli

Scientific classification
- Kingdom: Animalia
- Phylum: Arthropoda
- Class: Insecta
- Order: Orthoptera
- Suborder: Ensifera
- Family: Tettigoniidae
- Subfamily: Bradyporinae
- Tribe: Ephippigerini
- Genus: Parasteropleurus; Barat, 2012

= Parasteropleurus =

Genus of cricket-like animals

Parasteropleurus is a genus of bush crickets in the tribe Ephippigerini, erected by J. Barat in 2012 with insects that resembled Steropleurus. To date (2022) species have been recorded from the Iberian Peninsula and North Africa.

== Species ==
The Orthoptera Species File lists:

1. Parasteropleurus algericus (Brunner von Wattenwyl, 1882)
2. Parasteropleurus balearicus (Bolívar, 1884)
3. Parasteropleurus gracilis (Nadig, 1981)
4. Parasteropleurus inenormis (Bolívar, 1907)
5. Parasteropleurus lucasi (Brunner von Wattenwyl, 1882)
6. Parasteropleurus martorellii (Bolívar, 1878) (2 subspecies)
7. Parasteropleurus nerii (Vosseler, 1902) (2 subspecies)
8. Parasteropleurus perezii (Bolívar, 1877) - type species (as Ephippiger perezii Bolívar)
