= Odontura =

Odontura is the scientific name of two genera of organisms and may refer to:

- Odontura (fungus) – a genus of fungi in the family Odontotremataceae
- Odontura (katydid) – a genus of bush crickets or katydids in the family Tettigoniidae subfamily Phaneropterinae
