= Lluciapomaresius =

Scientific classification
- Domain: Eukaryota
- Kingdom: Animalia
- Phylum: Arthropoda
- Class: Insecta
- Order: Orthoptera
- Suborder: Ensifera
- Family: Tettigoniidae
- Subfamily: Bradyporinae
- Tribe: Ephippigerini
- Genus: Lluciapomaresius; Barat, 2012

Genus of cricket-like animals

External image
- Images at iNaturalist

Lluciapomaresius is a genus of European bush crickets in the tribe Ephippigerini, first described by J. Barat in 2012. To date (2023) species have only been recorded from the Iberian Peninsula.

== Species ==
The Orthoptera Species File lists:

1. Lluciapomaresius anapaulae (Schmidt, 2009)
2. Lluciapomaresius asturiensis (Bolívar, 1898)
3. Lluciapomaresius eclipticus (Barat, 2004)
4. Lluciapomaresius nobrei (Bolívar, 1898)
5. Lluciapomaresius ortegai (Pantel, 1896) - type species (as Ephippigera ortegai Pantel)
6. Lluciapomaresius panteli (Navás, 1899)
7. Lluciapomaresius stalii (Bolívar, 1877)
