= Sabaterpia =

Scientific classification
- Domain: Eukaryota
- Kingdom: Animalia
- Phylum: Arthropoda
- Class: Insecta
- Order: Orthoptera
- Suborder: Ensifera
- Family: Tettigoniidae
- Subfamily: Bradyporinae
- Tribe: Ephippigerini
- Genus: Sabaterpia; Barat, 2012

Genus of cricket-like animals

External image
- Image at iNaturalist

Sabaterpia is a genus of European bush crickets in the tribe Ephippigerini, first described by J. Barat in 2012. To date (2023) species have been recorded from the Iberian Peninsula and North Africa.

== Species ==
The Orthoptera Species File lists:

1. Sabaterpia hispanica (Kollar, 1853)
2. Sabaterpia paulinoi (Bolívar, 1877)
3. Sabaterpia taeniata (Saussure, 1898) - type species (as Ephippigera taeniata Saussure)
4. Sabaterpia valida (Werner, 1932)
