= Grylloderes =

Scientific classification
- Domain: Eukaryota
- Kingdom: Animalia
- Phylum: Arthropoda
- Class: Insecta
- Order: Orthoptera
- Suborder: Ensifera
- Superfamily: Grylloidea
- Family: Gryllidae
- Subfamily: Gryllinae
- Genus: Grylloderes; Bolívar, 1894

Genus of crickets

External image
- Images at iNaturalist

Grylloderes is a genus of crickets in the subfamily Gryllinae, unplaced in any tribe; it was erected by Ignacio Bolívar in 1894.

== Species ==
The Orthoptera Species File presently (2024) only includes the type species Grylloderes brunneri (Riggio, 1888) (originally Gryllodes brunneri Riggio, 1888). It has been recorded from Sicily, Tunisia and the Meriteranean islands in between.

Note the following species names previously have been included here:

- Grylloderes atritus= Platygryllus atritus Otte & Cade, 1984
- Grylloderes capensis = P. capensis Otte & Cade, 1984
- Grylloderes cockbilli = P. cockbilli (Chopard, 1954)
- Grylloderes ignobilis = P. ignobilis (Walker, 1869)
- Grylloderes primiformis = P. primiformis Otte & Cade, 1984
- Grylloderes quadristrigatus = P. quadristrigatus (Saussure, 1877) (type species)
