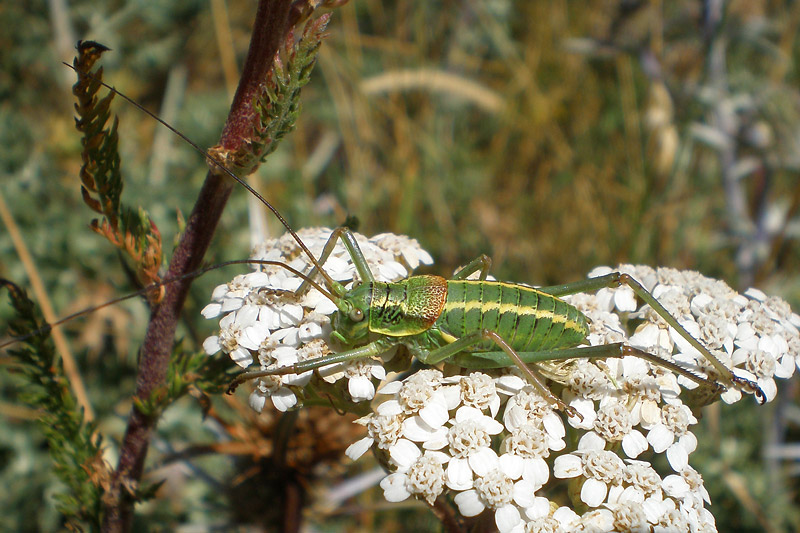
- Sorapagus catalaunicus

Scientific classification
- Domain: Eukaryota
- Kingdom: Animalia
- Phylum: Arthropoda
- Class: Insecta
- Order: Orthoptera
- Suborder: Ensifera
- Family: Tettigoniidae
- Subfamily: Bradyporinae
- Tribe: Ephippigerini
- Genus: Sorapagus; Barat, 2012

Synonyms
- Steropleurus ceretanus Kruseman & Jeekel, 1964; Ephippigera catalaunica Bolívar, I. 1907; Uromenus (Steropleurus) catalaunicus Bolívar, I. 1907

= Sorapagus =

Genus of cricket-like animals

Sorapagus is a monotypic genus of bush crickets in the tribe Ephippigerini, erected by J. Barat in 2012. The single species had long been placed in the genus Steropleurus.

== Species ==
The Orthoptera Species File only includes Sorapagus catalaunicus (Bolívar, 1898) in this genus. It is endemic to the Pyrénées mountain range and sometimes called the Catalan saddle bush-cricket.
