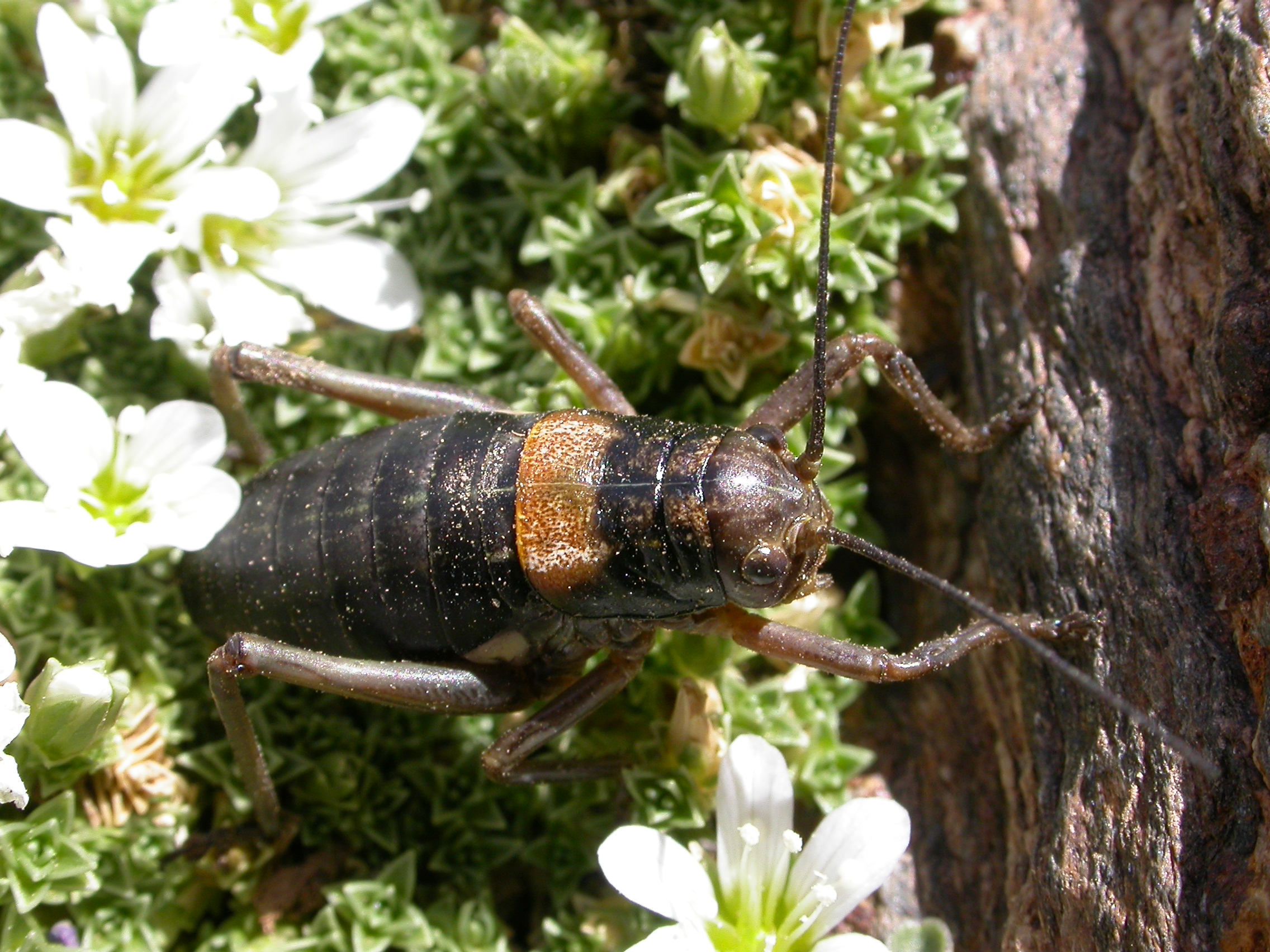

Conservation status
- Endangered (IUCN 3.1)

Scientific classification
- Kingdom: Animalia
- Phylum: Arthropoda
- Clade: Pancrustacea
- Class: Insecta
- Order: Orthoptera
- Suborder: Ensifera
- Family: Tettigoniidae
- Subfamily: Bradyporinae
- Tribe: Ephippigerini
- Genus: Baetica; Ignacio Bolívar
- Species: B. ustulata

Binomial name
- Baetica ustulata (Rambur, 1839)

= Baetica ustulata =

Species of cricket-like animal

Baetica ustulata is the only species of bush crickets in the monotypic genus Baetica (tribe Ephippigerini).

It is endemic to Spain and was previously known under its original placement as Ephippiger ustulata Rambur, 1838. The species feeds on plants, decaying organic matter, and others of its own species.

== See also ==
- List of Orthopteroid genera containing species recorded in Europe
- Media related to Baetica ustulata at Wikimedia Commons
