= Baratia =

Scientific classification
- Kingdom: Animalia
- Phylum: Arthropoda
- Class: Insecta
- Order: Orthoptera
- Suborder: Ensifera
- Family: Tettigoniidae
- Subfamily: Bradyporinae
- Tribe: Ephippigerini
- Genus: Baratia; Llucià Pomares, 2021

Genus of insects

External image
- Images at iNaturalist

Baratia is a genus of bush crickets in the tribe Ephippigerini, described in 2021.

To date, this is a monotypic genus containing the single species Baratia sari Llucià Pomares, 2021, found in Spain.
