= Lucasinova =

Scientific classification
- Missing taxonomy template (fix): Lucasinova
- Species: Template:Taxonomy/LucasinovaL. nigromarginata

Binomial name
- Template:Taxonomy/LucasinovaLucasinova nigromarginata (Lucas, 1847)

Synonyms
- Lucasia Barat, 2012 (genus); Ephippigera [sic] dorsalis Fieber, 1853; Uromenus (Ephippigerida) nigro-marginatus [sic] (Lucas, 1847); Ephippigerida nigrosignata [sic] (Lucas, 1847)

Genus and species of bush crickets

Lucasinova is a monotypic genus of bush crickets, erected by J. Barat in 2012, as part of a revision of the tribe Ephippigerini. It is named after P.H. Lucas, who deposited a specimen from Algeria at the Museum National d'Histoire Naturelle (MNHN), Paris.

== Species ==
To date (2026), this genus contains the single species Lucasinova nigromarginata (Lucas, 1847). Records of occurrence include southern France, Sicily and North Africa.

== See also ==
- List of Orthopteroid genera containing species recorded in Europe
- Data related to Ephippigerini at Wikispecies
- Images at iNaturalist
