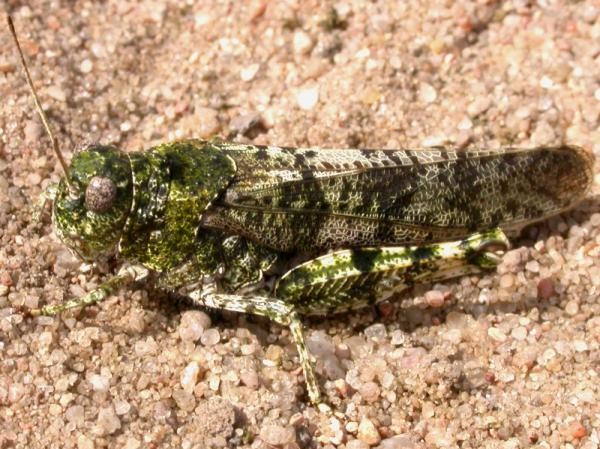
- Bryodemella tuberculata

Scientific classification
- Domain: Eukaryota
- Kingdom: Animalia
- Phylum: Arthropoda
- Class: Insecta
- Order: Orthoptera
- Suborder: Caelifera
- Family: Acrididae
- Subfamily: Oedipodinae
- Tribe: Bryodemini
- Genus: Bryodemella
- Species: B. tuberculata

Binomial name
- Bryodemella tuberculata (Fabricius, 1775)

= Bryodemella tuberculata =

Species of grasshopper

Close-Up of a Bryodemella tuberculata

Bryodemella tuberculata is a grasshopper species in the subfamily Oedipodinae. It is found in Central and Northern Europe. Their habitat is sparsely overgrown, sandy heaths, as well as gravel areas on mountain rivers and streams. The species has the largest genome of any insect studied so far.

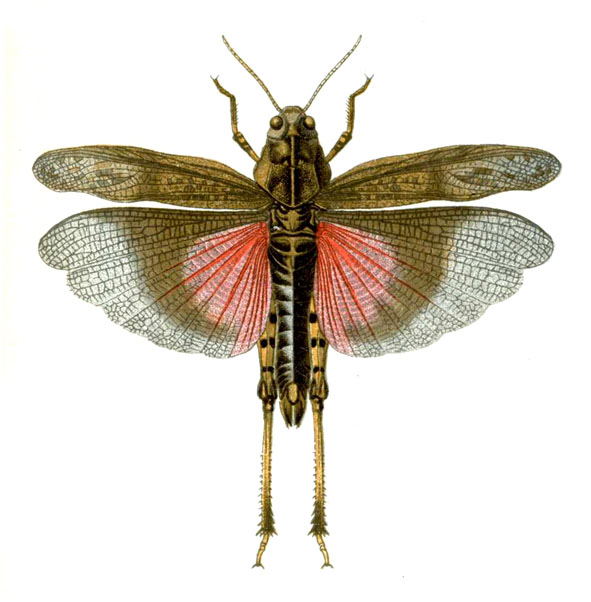
