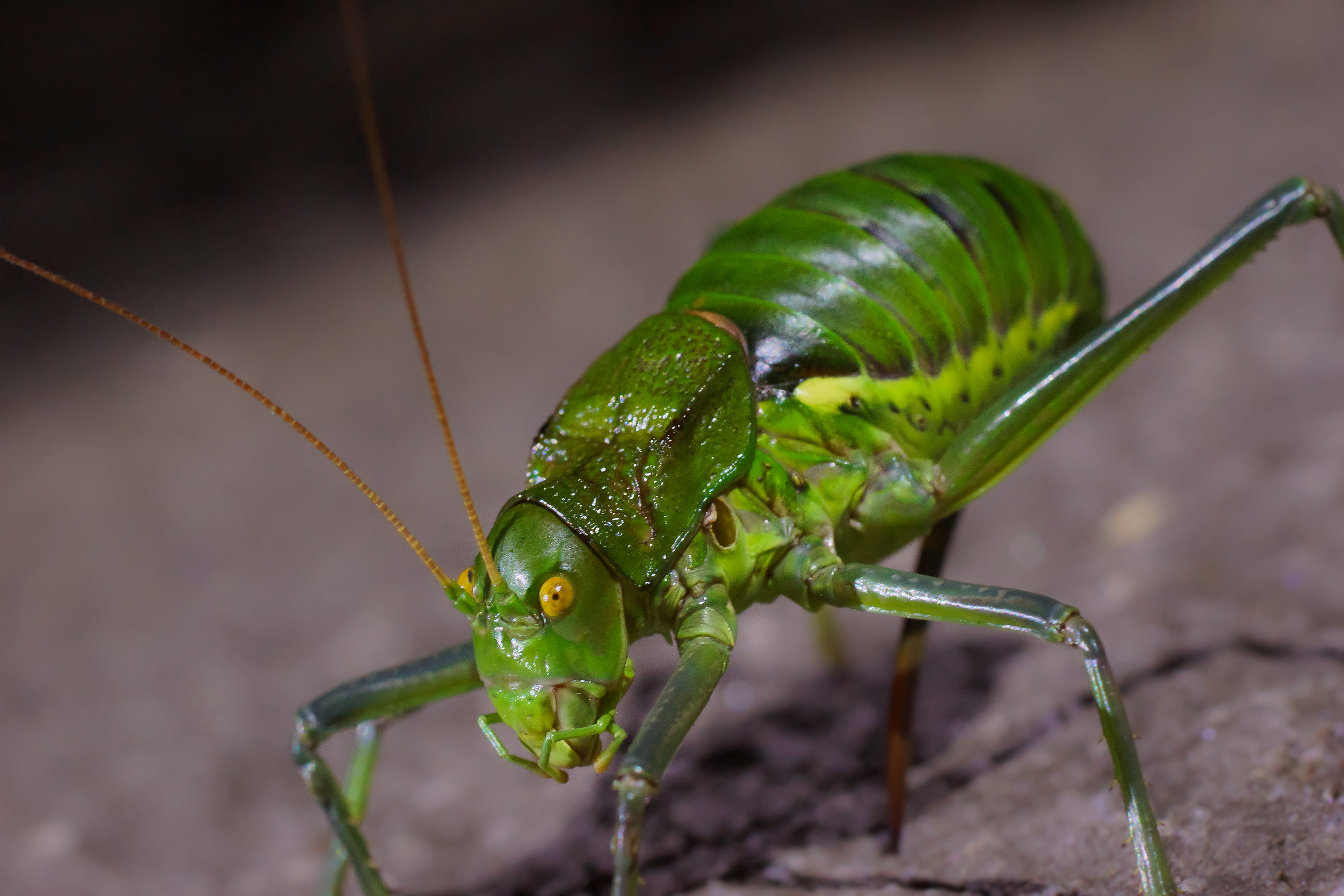
- Neocallicrania bolivarii

Scientific classification
- Domain: Eukaryota
- Kingdom: Animalia
- Phylum: Arthropoda
- Class: Insecta
- Order: Orthoptera
- Suborder: Ensifera
- Family: Tettigoniidae
- Subfamily: Bradyporinae
- Tribe: Ephippigerini
- Genus: Neocallicrania; Pfau, 1996

= Neocallicrania =

Genus of cricket-like animals

Neocallicrania is a genus of armoured ground-crickets in the family Tettigoniidae. There are about six described species in Neocallicrania, found mainly in southwest Europe.

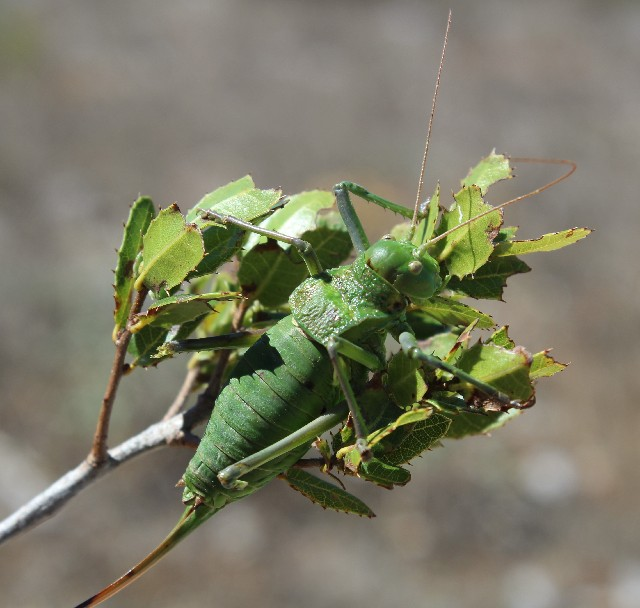
Neocallicrania selligera

== Species ==
These six species belong to the genus Neocallicrania:

- Neocallicrania barrosi Barat, 2013 (barros' saddle bush-cricket)
- Neocallicrania bolivarii (Seoane, 1878) (Bolivar's Saddle Bush-cricket)
- Neocallicrania lusitanica (Aires & Menano, 1916) (Coruche Saddle Bush-cricket)
- Neocallicrania miegii (Bolívar, 1873) (Mieg's Saddle Bush-cricket)
- Neocallicrania selligera (Charpentier, 1825) (lusitanian saddle bush-cricket)
- Neocallicrania serrata (Bolívar, 1885)
