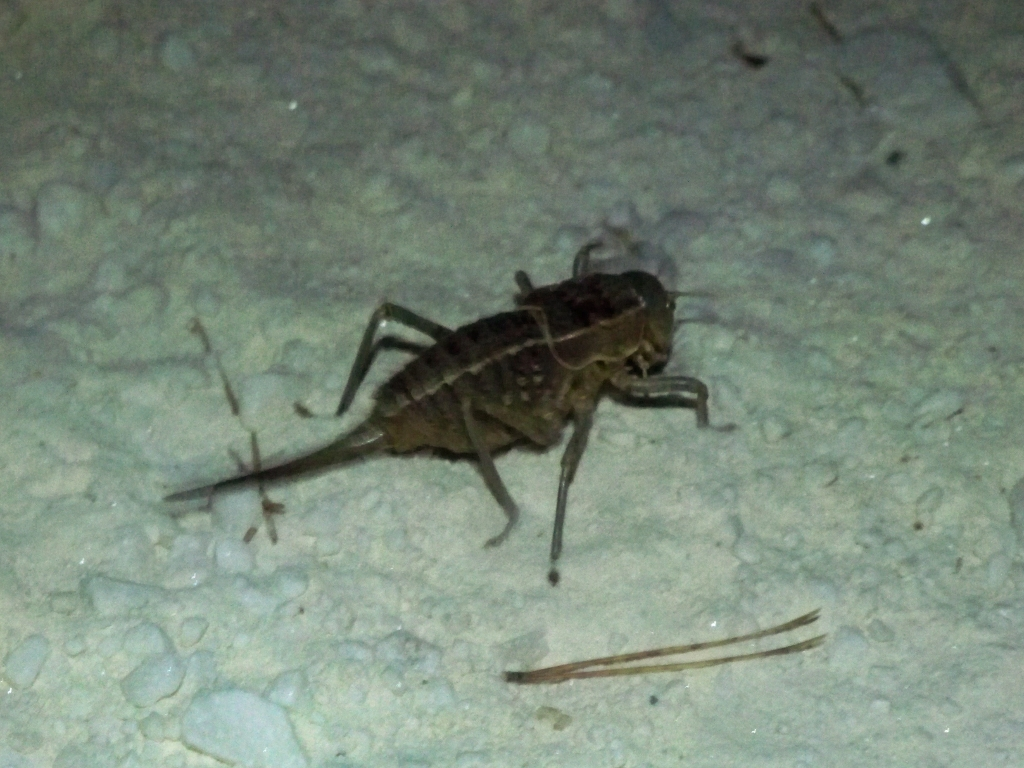
- Pycnogaster algecirensis female

Scientific classification
- Domain: Eukaryota
- Kingdom: Animalia
- Phylum: Arthropoda
- Class: Insecta
- Order: Orthoptera
- Suborder: Ensifera
- Family: Tettigoniidae
- Subfamily: Bradyporinae
- Tribe: Bradyporini
- Genus: Pycnogaster; Graells, 1851

Synonyms
- Bathyscaphes Fieber, 1853; Pycnomus Bolívar, 1926

= Pycnogaster =

Genus of cricket-like animals

Pycnogaster is a genus of bush crickets in the tribe Bradyporini erected by Mariano de la Paz Graells y de la Agüera in 1851. To date (2022) species have been recorded from the Iberian Peninsula and North Africa.

== Species ==
The Orthoptera Species File lists:

subgenus Bradygaster Bolívar, 1926

1. Pycnogaster algecirensis Bolívar, 1926
2. Pycnogaster finotii Bolívar, 1881
3. Pycnogaster gaditana Bolívar, 1900
4. Pycnogaster inermis (Rambur, 1838)
5. Pycnogaster ribesiglesiasii Olmo-Vidal, 2021
6. Pycnogaster sanchezgomezi Bolívar, 1897

subgenus Pycnogaster Graells, 1851

1. Pycnogaster cucullatus (Charpentier, 1825)
2. Pycnogaster graellsii Bolívar, 1873
3. Pycnogaster jugicola Graells, 1851 - type species
4. Pycnogaster valentini Pinedo & Llorente del Moral, 1987
