= Zichya (katydid) =

Scientific classification
- Domain: Eukaryota
- Kingdom: Animalia
- Phylum: Arthropoda
- Class: Insecta
- Order: Orthoptera
- Suborder: Ensifera
- Family: Tettigoniidae
- Subfamily: Bradyporinae
- Tribe: Zichyini
- Genus: Zichya; Bolívar, 1901

Genus of insects

External image
- Images at iNaturalist

Zichya is a genus of bush crickets typical to the tribe Zichyini from central Asia; it was erected by Ignacio Bolívar in 1901.

== Species ==
The Orthoptera Species File lists:

1. Zichya alashanica Bey-Bienko, 1951
2. Zichya baranovi Bey-Bienko, 1933 - 3 subspecies:
  type species is Z. mongolica Uvarov (= Z. baranovi mongolica) by subsequent designation
3. Zichya brevicauda Bey-Bienko, 1951
4. Zichya crassicerca Bey-Bienko, 1951
5. Zichya odonticerca Zheng, 1986
6. Zichya piechockii Cejchan, 1967
7. Zichya tenggerensis Zheng, 1986
