= Callicrania =

Scientific classification
- Domain: Eukaryota
- Kingdom: Animalia
- Phylum: Arthropoda
- Class: Insecta
- Order: Orthoptera
- Suborder: Ensifera
- Family: Tettigoniidae
- Subfamily: Bradyporinae
- Tribe: Ephippigerini
- Genus: Callicrania; Bolívar, 1898

Genus of cricket-like animals

External image
- Image at iNaturalist

Callicrania is a genus of European bush crickets in the tribe Ephippigerini, first described by Ignacio Bolívar in 1898 as "Ephippigera (Callicrania)". To date (2022), species have only been recorded from the Iberian Peninsula.

== Species ==
The Orthoptera Species File lists:

subgenus Callicrania Bolívar, 1898

1. Callicrania belarrensis Barat, 2007
2. Callicrania denticulata Barat, 2007
3. Callicrania plaxicauda Barat, 2007
4. Callicrania ramburii (Bolívar, 1878) - type species (as Ephippiger ramburii Bolívar, by subsequent designation

subgenus Mucrocallicrania Barat, 2007

1. Callicrania demandae (Schroeter & Pfau, 1987)
2. Callicrania faberi (Harz, 1975)
3. Callicrania vicentae Barat, 2007
