= Platygryllus primiformis =

Scientific classification
- Domain: Eukaryota
- Kingdom: Animalia
- Phylum: Arthropoda
- Class: Insecta
- Order: Orthoptera
- Suborder: Ensifera
- Family: Gryllidae
- Genus: Platygryllus
- Species: P. primiformis

Binomial name
- Platygryllus primiformis Otte & Cade, 1984

Species of cricket

Platygryllus primiformis is a small (approx. 2–3 centimetres or 0.8–1.2 inches) brown cricket and is a member of the true cricket family Gryllidae.

== Location ==
This cricket is found in Eastern and Southern Africa.

== Uses ==
This cricket has been used as a study species in behavioural ecology, specifically mate choice.
