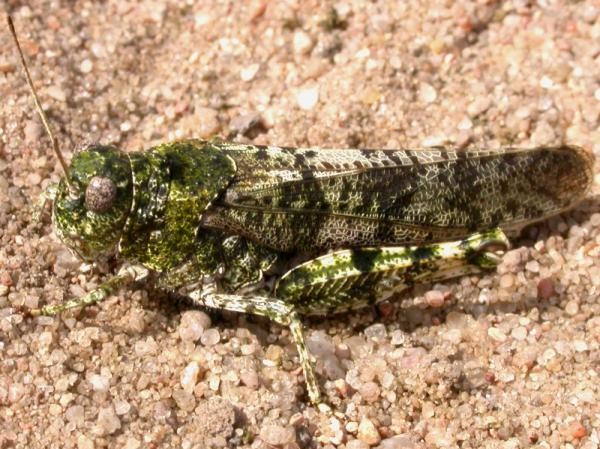

Scientific classification
- Domain: Eukaryota
- Kingdom: Animalia
- Phylum: Arthropoda
- Class: Insecta
- Order: Orthoptera
- Suborder: Caelifera
- Family: Acrididae
- Subfamily: Oedipodinae
- Tribe: Bryodemini
- Genus: Bryodemella; Yin, 1984

= Bryodemella =

Genus of grasshoppers

Bryodemella is a genus of grasshoppers belonging to the tribe Bryodemini; the genus was first described by Yin in 1982.

The species of this genus are found in Eurasia.

== Species ==
The Orthoptera Species File lists:

subgenus Bryodemella Yin, 1982

1. Bryodemella diamesum (Bey-Bienko, 1930)
2. Bryodemella elegans Li, 1997
3. Bryodemella gansuensis (Zheng, 1985)
4. Bryodemella holdereri (Krauss, 1901) - type species
5. Bryodemella nigrifemura Yin & Wang, 2005
6. Bryodemella nigripennis Zheng, Zhang & Zeng, 2011
7. Bryodemella rufifemura Zhang, Zhi & Zhang, 2018
8. Bryodemella tuberculata (Fabricius, 1775)
9. Bryodemella xinjiangensis Yin & Wang, 2005
10. Bryodemella xizangensis Yin, 1984

subgenus Marikovskiella Benediktov, 2009

1. Bryodemella Angaridella Benediktov, 1998
2. Bryodemella orientalis (Bey-Bienko, 1930)
3. Bryodemella semenovi (Ikonnikov, 1911)
4. Bryodemella zaisanica (Bey-Bienko, 1930)
