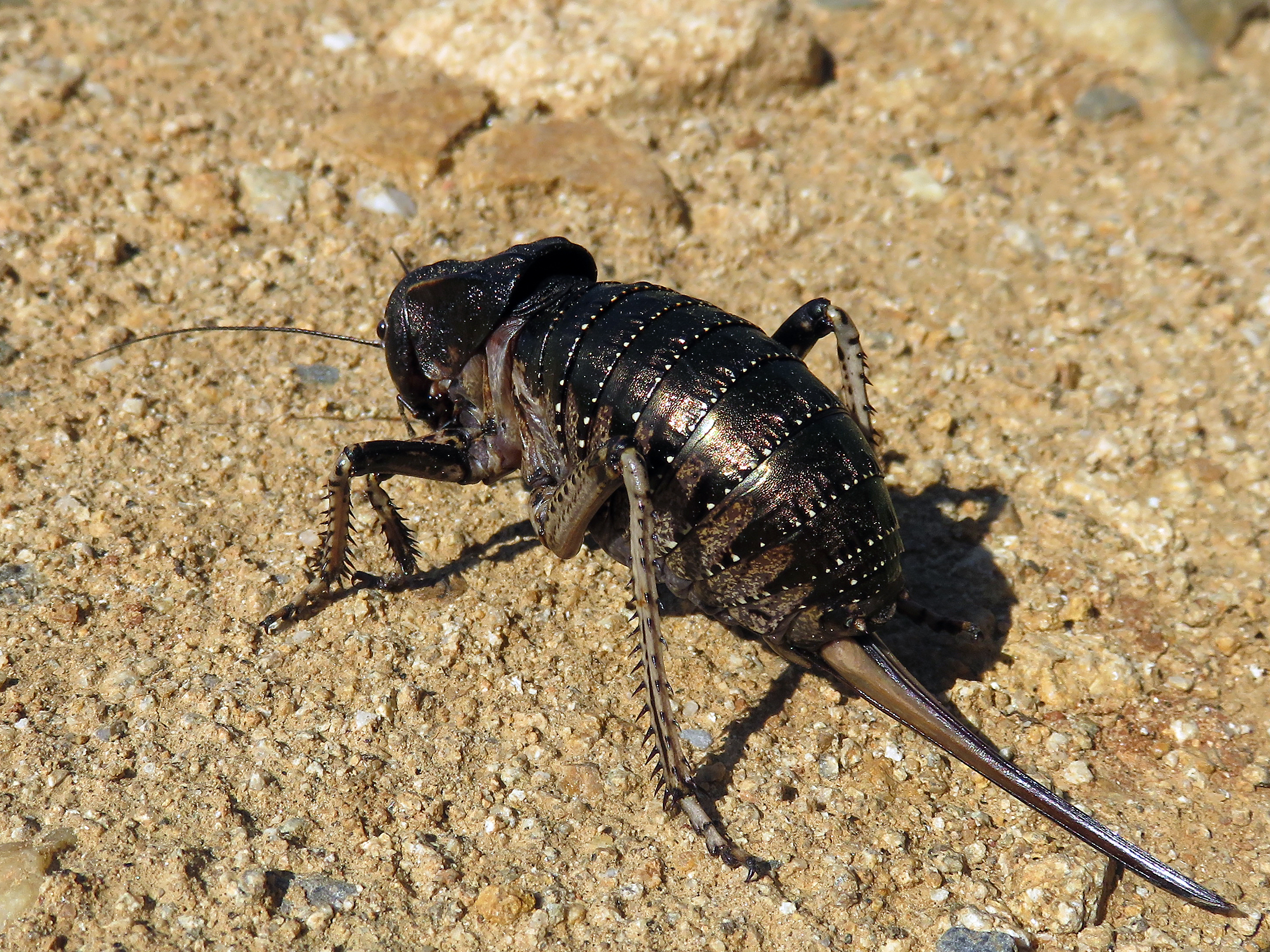
- Bradyporus dasypus female

Scientific classification
- Kingdom: Animalia
- Phylum: Arthropoda
- Clade: Pancrustacea
- Class: Insecta
- Order: Orthoptera
- Suborder: Ensifera
- Family: Tettigoniidae
- Subfamily: Bradyporinae
- Tribe: Bradyporini
- Genus: Bradyporus; Charpentier, 1825

Synonyms
- Callimus Fischer von Waldheim, 1833; Derallimus Caudell, 1912; Dinarchus Stål, 1874

= Bradyporus =

Genus of cricket-like animals

Bradyporus is a genus of bush crickets, found in south-eastern Europe and western and central Asia. It is the type genus of the subfamily Bradyporinae and tribe Bradyporini.

== Species ==
Species within this genus include:

subgenus Bradyporus Charpentier, 1825

- Bradyporus dasypus Illiger, 1800 - type species

subgenus Callimenus Fischer von Waldheim, 1830

- Bradyporus avanos Ünal, 2011
- Bradyporus conophallus Ünal, 2011
- Bradyporus dilatatus Stål, 1875
- Bradyporus gocmeni Ünal, 2017
- Bradyporus inexpectatus Ünal, 2019
- Bradyporus karabagi Ünal, 2011
- Bradyporus latipes Stål, 1875
- Bradyporus macrogaster Lefebvre, 1831
- Bradyporus montandoni Burr, 1898
- Bradyporus multituberculatus Fischer von Waldheim, 1833
- Bradyporus oniscus Burmeister, 1838
- Bradyporus sureyai Ünal, 2011
- Bradyporus toros Ünal, 2011
