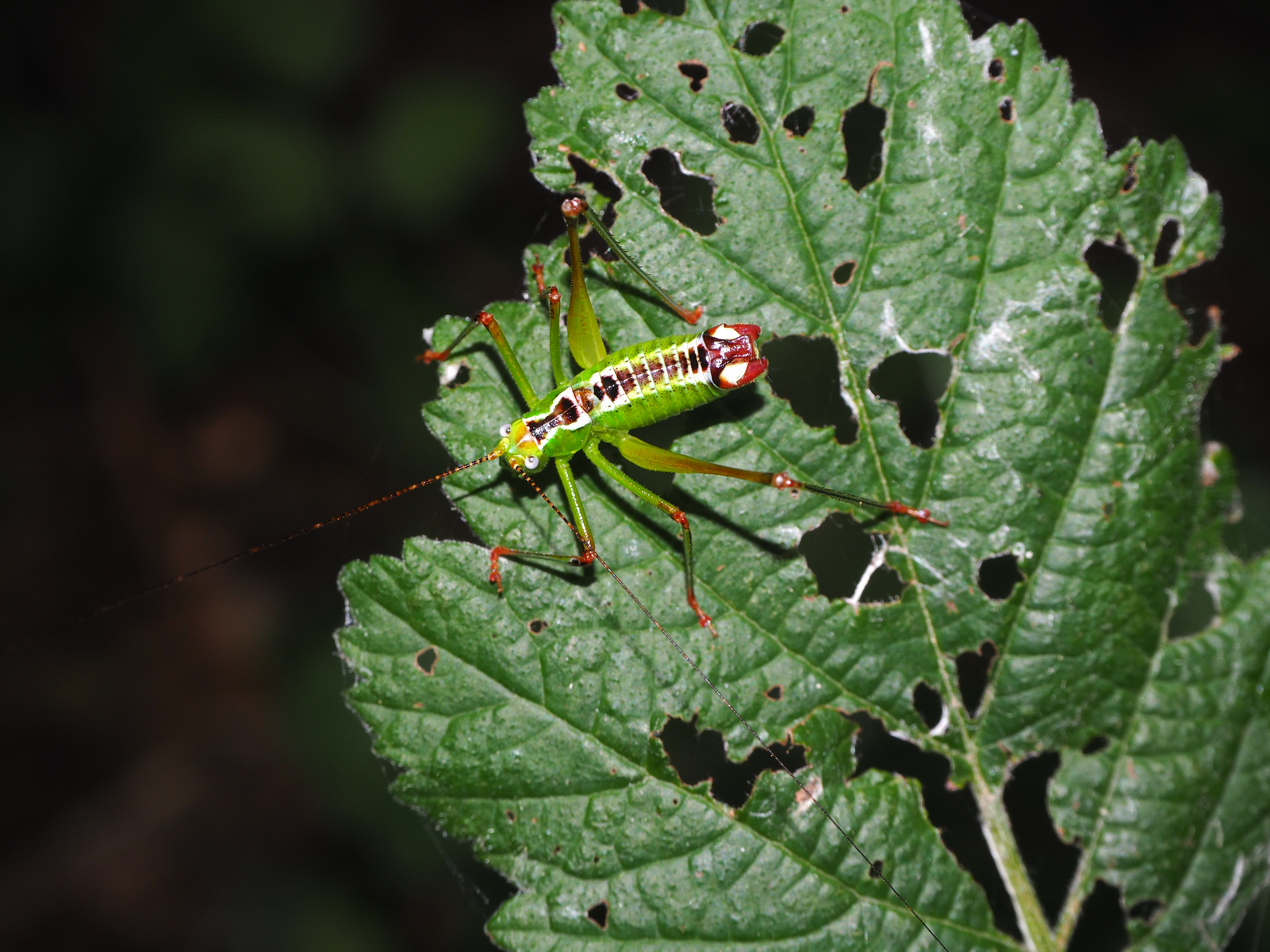
- Andreiniimon nuptialis male
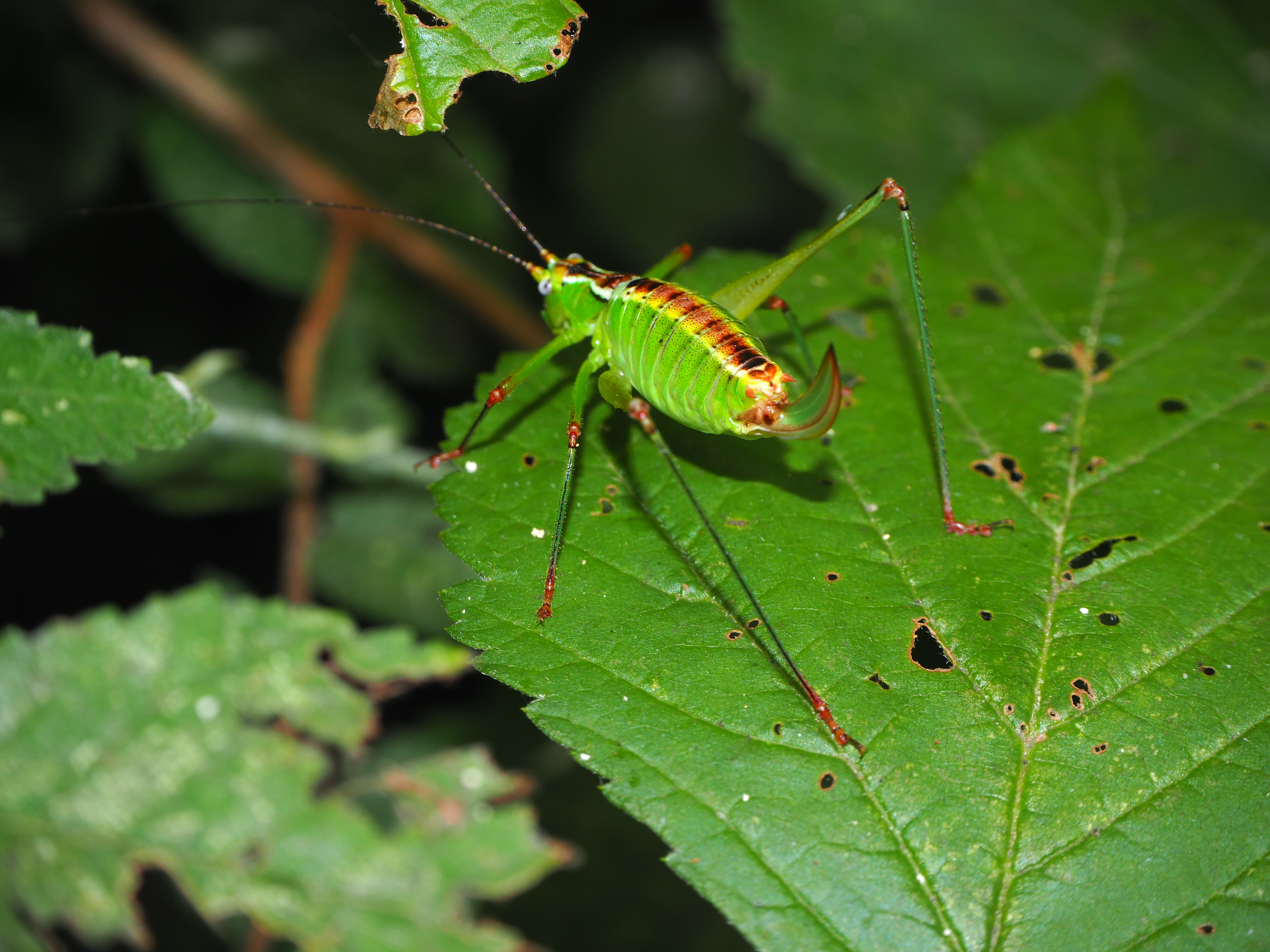
- A. nuptialis female

Conservation status
- Vulnerable (IUCN 3.1)

Scientific classification
- Domain: Eukaryota
- Kingdom: Animalia
- Phylum: Arthropoda
- Class: Insecta
- Order: Orthoptera
- Suborder: Ensifera
- Family: Tettigoniidae
- Subfamily: Phaneropterinae
- Tribe: Barbitistini
- Genus: Andreiniimon; Capra, 1937
- Species: A. nuptialis

Binomial name
- Andreiniimon nuptialis (Karny, 1918)

= Andreiniimon =

Genus of cricket-like animals

Andreiniimon is a monotypic genus of European bush crickets in the subfamily Phaneropterinae and tribe Barbitistini, erected by F. Capra in 1937.

== Species ==
The Orthoptera Species File includes the single species Andreiniimon nuptialis (Karny, 1918), sometimes called the "splendid bush cricket". The species is very localized and is considered uncommon, nevertheless in recent years the recorded localities have greatly increased: from Greece and the Balkans west to Italy, where it is known only in a few localities on the Umbria-Marche Apennines, in the Trieste Karst and in the Ferrara area on the Po; there are some reports also for Lazio and Abruzzo. The type locality is: Portes, north of Durrës, Albania. The IUCN Red List classifies A. nuptialis as a vulnerable species.

=== Description and habitat ===
Andreiniimon nuptialis is a relatively unmistakable species due to its flamboyant white, red, green, black and yellow-orange colouration: especially in the males, where the configuration of the genital area is unmistakable amongst European genera. The ovipositor is relatively smooth and thin, with only a slight serration on the edge of the lower valve. The knees and tarsi areas are red. Females measure about 17 to 19 mm excluding the ovipositor, while males are around 16 mm. In the Trieste Karst, the species is mainly found on Sambucus ebulus, on the Po it was found in a markedly damp wood on small Rubus bushes, while in central Italy on Cornus sanguinea. Adults can be found from late May to July.

Andreiniimon nuptialis song

The song is very weak and can barely be heard with the unaided ear, being partly ultrasonic; adults may sing during the day, but mostly in the evening and at night.
