= Ephippigerida =

Scientific classification
- Domain: Eukaryota
- Kingdom: Animalia
- Phylum: Arthropoda
- Class: Insecta
- Order: Orthoptera
- Suborder: Ensifera
- Family: Tettigoniidae
- Subfamily: Bradyporinae
- Tribe: Ephippigerini
- Genus: Ephippigerida; Bolívar, 1903

Genus of cricket-like animals

External image
- Images at iNaturalist

Ephippigerida is a genus of European bush crickets in the tribe Ephippigerini, first described by Ignacio Bolívar in 1903 as Uromenus (Ephippigerida). To date (2022) species have only been recorded from the Iberian Peninsula.

== Species ==
The Orthoptera Species File lists:

subgenus Ephippigerida Bolívar, 1903

1. Ephippigerida areolaria (Bolívar, 1877) - type species (as Ephippiger areolarius Bolívar, by subsequent designation)
2. Ephippigerida asella Navás, 1907
3. Ephippigerida carinata (Bolívar, 1877)
4. Ephippigerida diluta (Bolívar, 1878)
5. Ephippigerida longicauda (Bolívar, 1873)
6. Ephippigerida marceti Navás, 1907
7. Ephippigerida pantingana (Navás, 1904)
8. Ephippigerida rosae Barat & Correas, 2015
9. Ephippigerida saussuriana (Bolívar, 1878)

subgenus Lobionifera Barat & Correas, 2015

1. Ephippigerida laserena Barat & Correas, 2015

subgenus Parisia Domenech Fernández, 2022

1. Ephippigerida barati Domenech Fernández, 2022
