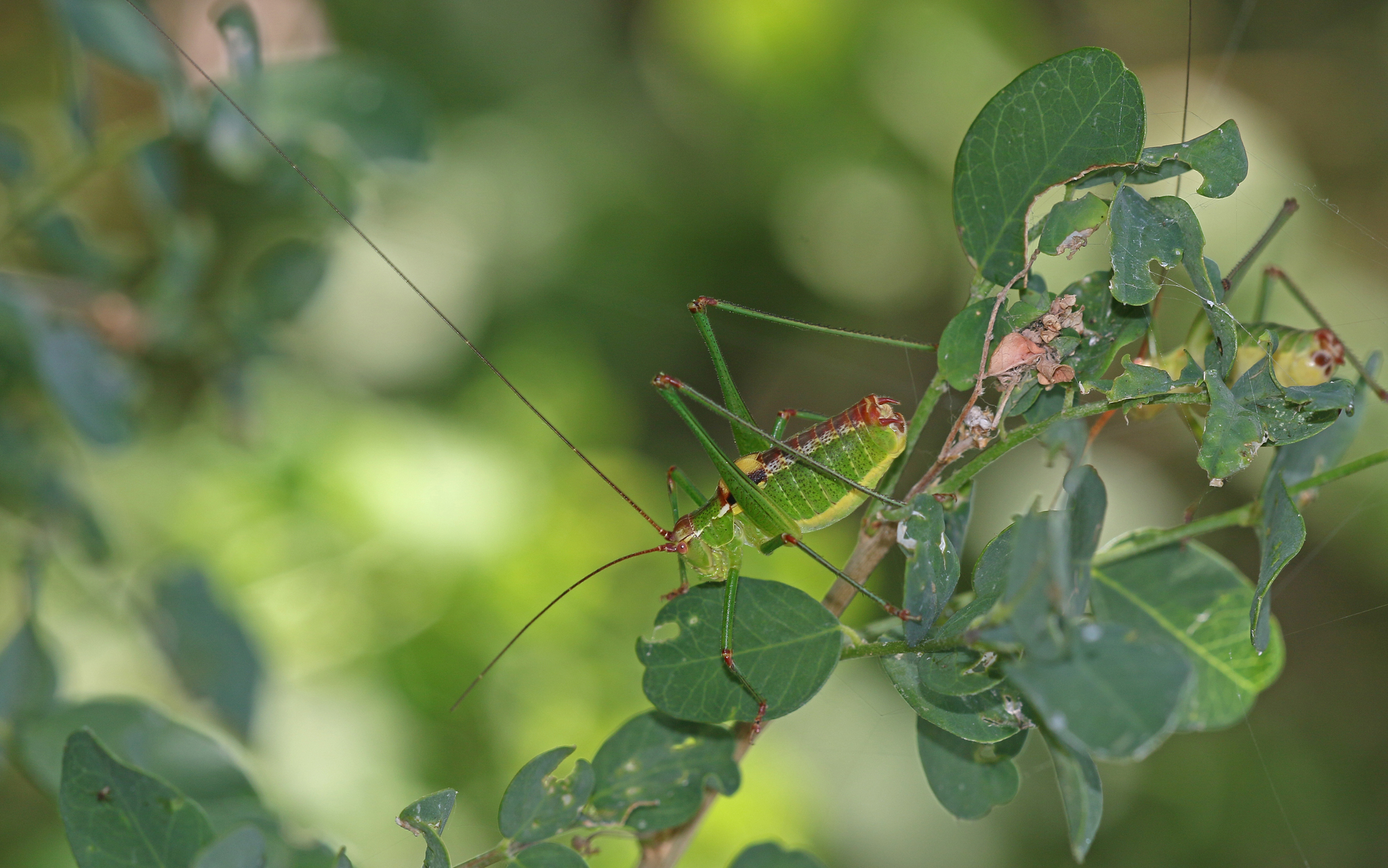
- Ancistrura nigrovittata male

Scientific classification
- Kingdom: Animalia
- Phylum: Arthropoda
- Class: Insecta
- Order: Orthoptera
- Suborder: Ensifera
- Family: Tettigoniidae
- Subfamily: Phaneropterinae
- Tribe: Barbitistini
- Genus: Ancistrura; Uvarov, 1921
- Species: A. nigrovittata

Binomial name
- Ancistrura nigrovittata (Brunner von Wattenwyl, 1878)
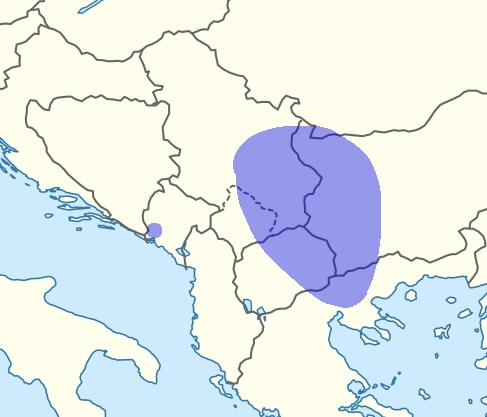

Synonyms
- Ancistrura kinzelbachi Harz, 1975; Ancistrura truncata Uvarov, 1921; Barbitistes brunneri Pančić, 1883; Barbitistes nigrovittatus Brunner von Wattenwyl, 1878

= Ancistrura =

Genus of cricket-like animals

External image
- Images at iNaturalist

Ancistrura is a monotypic genus of European bush crickets in the subfamily Phaneropterinae and tribe Barbitistini, erected by Boris Uvarov in 1921.

== Species ==
The Orthoptera Species File includes the single species Ancistrura nigrovittata (Brunner von Wattenwyl, 1878), which is found in the Balkans and Greece; it was originally placed in the genus Barbitistes.
