= Platygryllus =

Scientific classification
- Kingdom: Animalia
- Phylum: Arthropoda
- Clade: Pancrustacea
- Class: Insecta
- Order: Orthoptera
- Suborder: Ensifera
- Family: Gryllidae
- Subfamily: Gryllinae
- Genus: Platygryllus; Chopard, 1961

Synonyms
- Gryllodes (Grylloderes) Bolívar, 1894

Genus of crickets

Platygryllus is a genus of crickets in the subfamily Gryllinae. Records of species distribution (probably incomplete) include Africa, southern Europe and in Asia: India, Java and the Philippines.

== Mating behaviour ==
Males of this genus transfer sperm to the female via a spermatophore which is externally attached to a females ovipositor. Male P. supplicans guard females after spermatophore transfer to prevent the female from removing his spermatophore prematurely. The females of P. primiformis use premature spermatophore removal as a form of cryptic female choice leaving larger males' spermatophores attached for significantly longer than smaller males.

== Species ==
The Orthoptera Species File includes:

1. Platygryllus arambourgi (Chopard, 1938)
2. Platygryllus atratulus (Walker, 1869)
3. Platygryllus atritus Otte & Cade, 1984
4. Platygryllus capensis Otte & Cade, 1984
5. Platygryllus cockbilli (Chopard, 1954)
6. Platygryllus congolensis Gorochov, 1984
7. Platygryllus ignobilis (Walker, 1869)
8. Platygryllus longus (Gorochov, 1988)
9. Platygryllus maurus (Afzelius & Brannius, 1804)
10. Platygryllus melanocephalus (Serville, 1838)
11. Platygryllus nefandus (Kirby, 1906)
12. Platygryllus olsufievi (Gorochov, 1988)
13. Platygryllus orlovskajae (Gorochov, 1988)
14. Platygryllus ovum (Gorochov, 1988)
15. Platygryllus primiformis Otte & Cade, 1984
16. Platygryllus quadristrigatus (Saussure, 1877) - type species (as Gryllus quadristrigatus Saussure)
17. Platygryllus satunini (Gorochov, 1988)
18. Platygryllus serengeticus Otte & Cade, 1984
19. Platygryllus subalatus (Chopard, 1951)
20. Platygryllus sudanus (Gorochov, 1988)
21. Platygryllus xanthocercus François & Defaut, 2018
