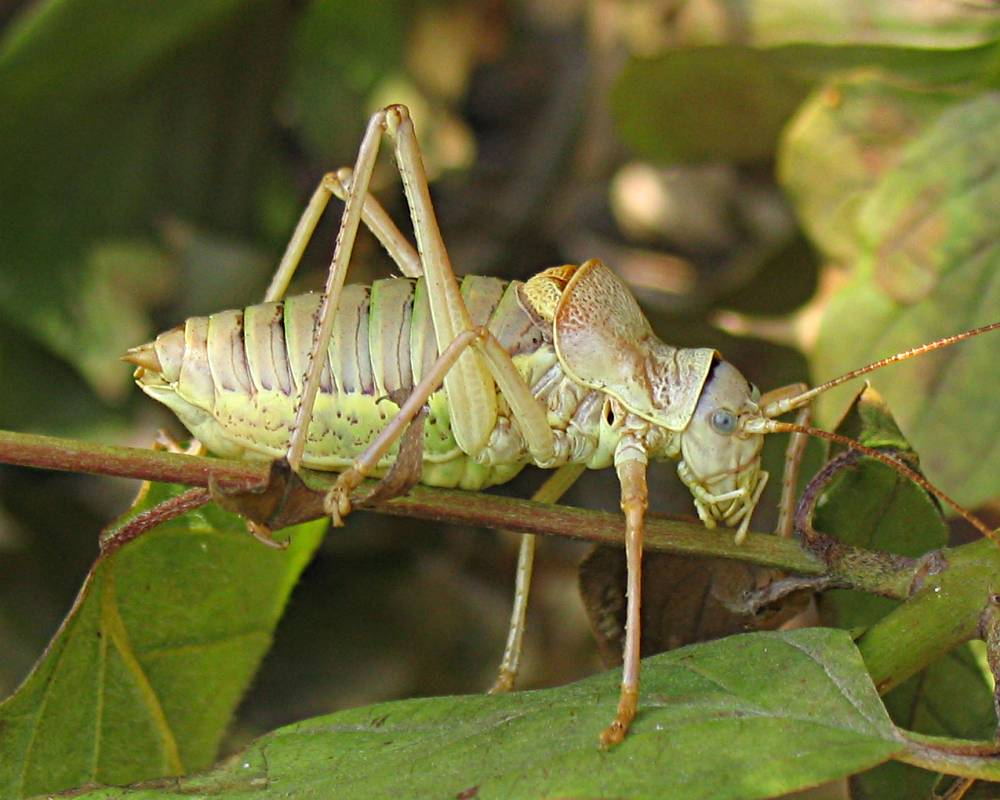
- Ephippiger ephippiger

Scientific classification
- Kingdom: Animalia
- Phylum: Arthropoda
- Clade: Pancrustacea
- Class: Insecta
- Order: Orthoptera
- Suborder: Ensifera
- Family: Tettigoniidae
- Subfamily: Bradyporinae
- Tribe: Ephippigerini; Brunner von Wattenwyl, 1878

Synonyms
- Ephippigeridae Brunner von Wattenwyl, 1878; Ephippigerinae Brunner von Wattenwyl, 1878

= Ephippigerini =

Tribe of cricket-like animals

The Ephippigerini are a tribe of bush crickets in the subfamily Bradyporinae, erected by Brunner von Wattenwyl in 1878. Species, including the typical Ephippiger ephippiger are sometimes called "saddle-backed bush crickets": they have been recorded from mainland Europe (not the British Isles or Scandinavia), North Africa and the Horn of Africa.

== Genera ==
The Orthoptera Species File lists:

1. Afrosteropleurus Barat, 2012
2. Albarracinia Barat, 2012 - monotypic Albarracinia zapaterii (Bolívar, 1877)
3. Baetica Bolivar, I., 1903 - monotypic Baetica ustulata (Rambur, 1839)
4. Baratia Llucià Pomares, 2021 - monotypic Baratia sari Llucià Pomares, 2021
5. Callicrania Bolívar, 1898
6. Coracinotus Barat, 2012
7. Corsteropleurus Barat, 2012 - monotypic Corsteropleurus chopardi (Ebner, 1938)
8. Dinarippiger Skejo, Kasalo, Fontana & Tvrtković, 2023 - monotypic Dinarippiger discoidalis (Fieber, 1853)
9. Ephippiger Berthold, 1827
10. Ephippigerida Bolivar, 1903
11. Lluciapomaresius Barat, 2012
12. Lucasinova Barat, 2012 - monotypic Lucasinova nigromarginata (Lucas, 1849)
13. Neocallicrania Pfau, 1996
14. Parasteropleurus Barat, 2012
15. Platystolus Bolivar, I., 1878
16. Praephippigera Bolivar, 1903
17. Sabaterpia Barat, 2012
18. Sorapagus Barat, 2012 - monotypic Sorapagus catalaunicus (Bolívar, 1898)
19. Steropleurus Bolivar, 1878
20. Synephippius Navás, 1905 - monotypic Synephippius obvius (Navás, 1904)
21. Uromenus Bolivar, 1878
