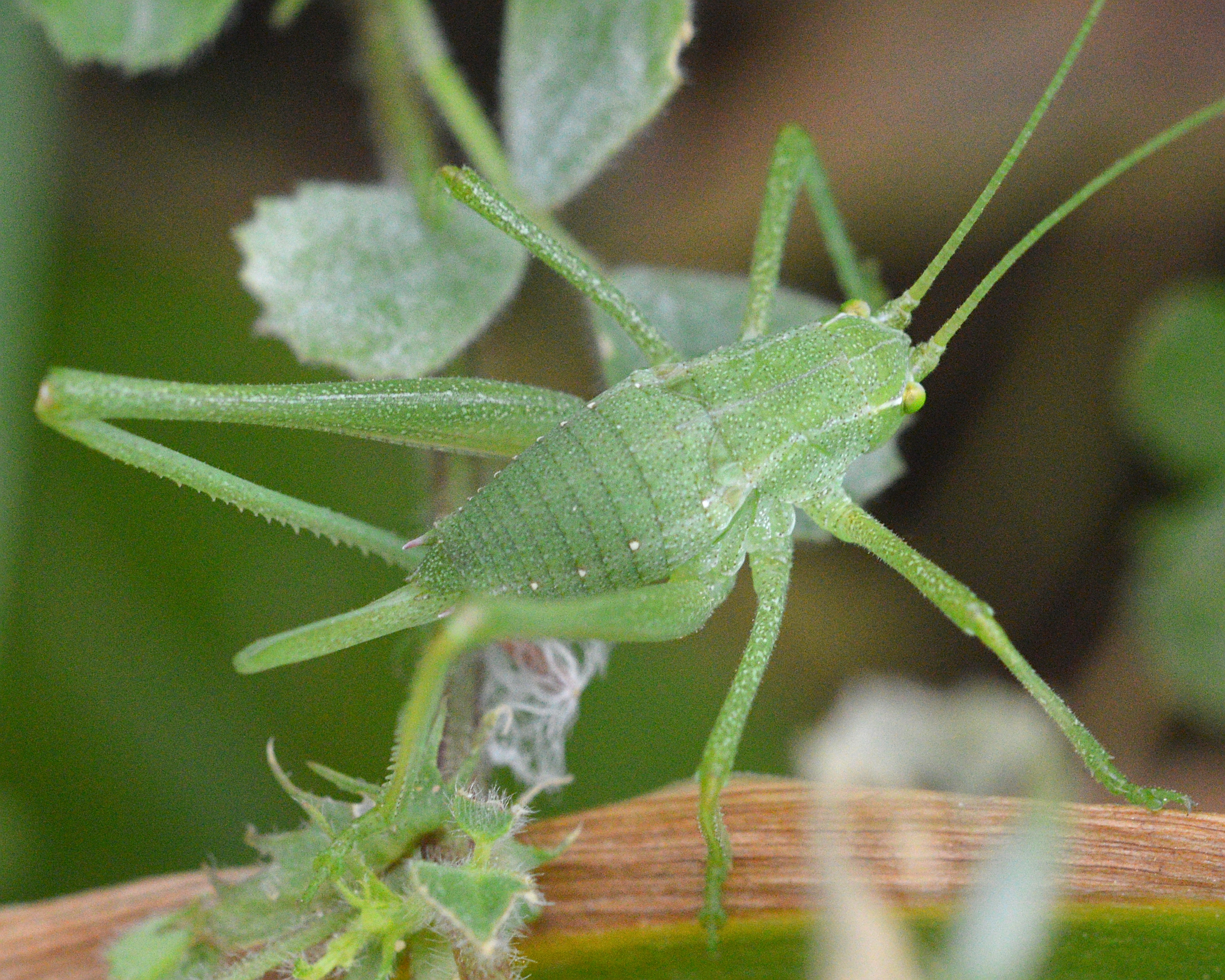
- Odontura calaritana

Scientific classification
- Kingdom: Animalia
- Phylum: Arthropoda
- Clade: Pancrustacea
- Class: Insecta
- Order: Orthoptera
- Suborder: Ensifera
- Family: Tettigoniidae
- Subfamily: Phaneropterinae
- Tribe: Odonturini
- Genus: Odontura; Rambur, 1838

= Odontura (katydid) =

Genus of cricket-like animals

Odontura is a genus of bush crickets in the subfamily Phaneropterinae and typical of the tribe Odonturini. Species can be found in Africa and Europe (Iberian Peninsula).

== Species ==
As of August 2020 the Orthoptera Species File listed species under two subgenera:

Odontura Rambur, 1838

- Odontura algerica Brunner von Wattenwyl, 1878
- Odontura borrei Bolívar, 1878
- Odontura brevis Werner, 1932
- Odontura calaritana Costa, 1883
- Odontura glabricauda (Charpentier, 1825)
  type species (as Barbitistes glabricauda Charpentier)
- Odontura liouvillei Werner, 1929
- Odontura maroccana Bolívar, 1908
- Odontura microptera Chopard, 1943
- Odontura moghrebica Morales-Agacino, 1950
- Odontura pulchra Bolívar, 1914
- Odontura quadridentata Krauss, 1893
- Odontura stenoxypha (Fieber, 1853)
- Odontura trilineata (Haan, 1843)
- Odontura uvarovi Werner, 1929

=== Odonturella ===
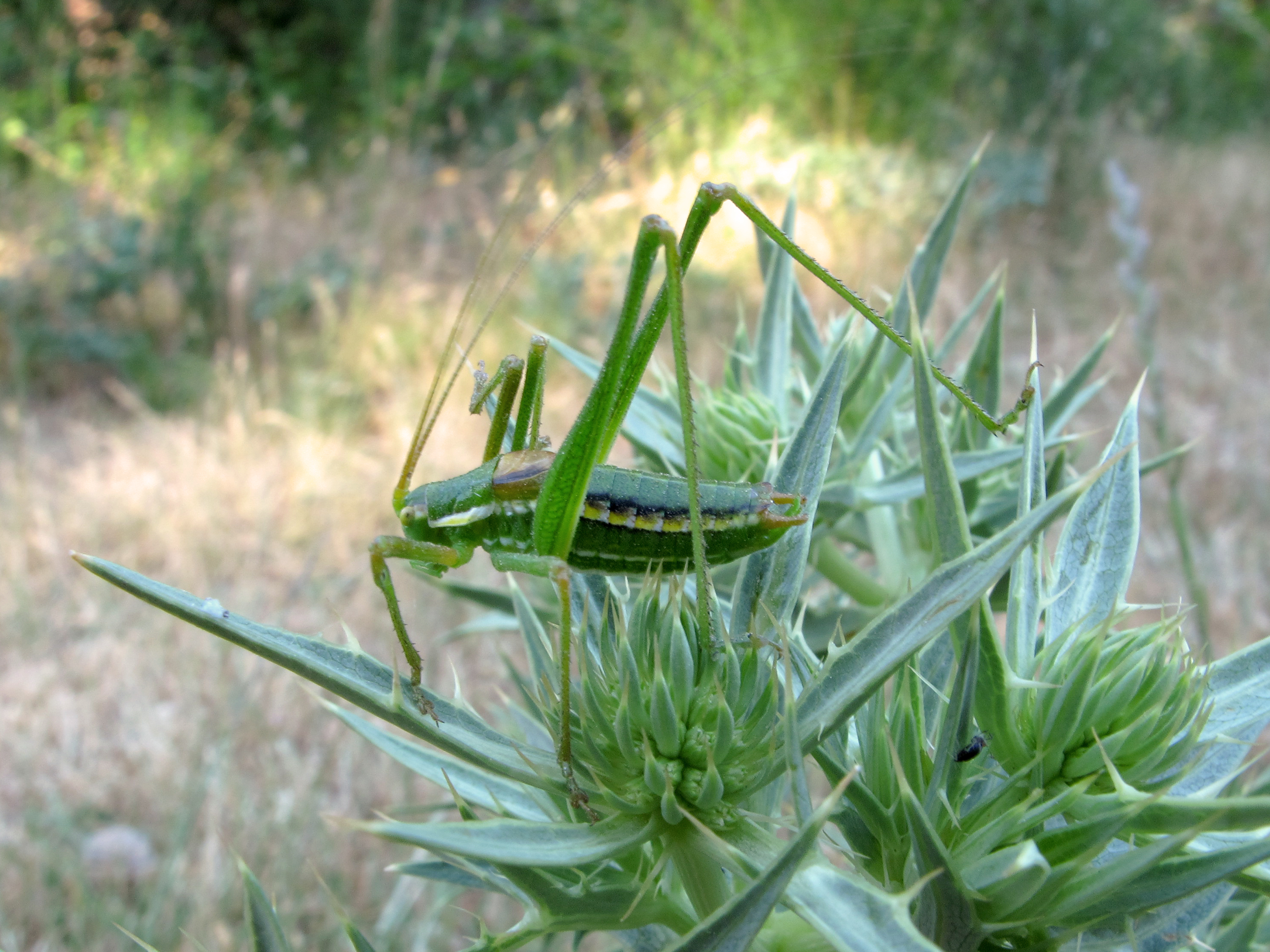
Odonturella macphersoni

Auth: Bolívar, 1900; now elevated to genus level.

- Odonturella aspericauda Rambur, 1838
- Odonturella macphersoni Morales-Agacino, 1943
