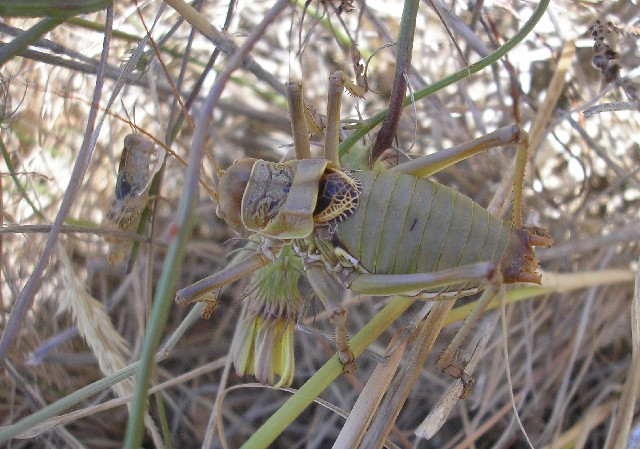
- Platystolus martinezii

Scientific classification
- Domain: Eukaryota
- Kingdom: Animalia
- Phylum: Arthropoda
- Class: Insecta
- Order: Orthoptera
- Suborder: Ensifera
- Family: Tettigoniidae
- Subfamily: Bradyporinae
- Tribe: Ephippigerini
- Genus: Platystolus; Bolívar, 1878

= Platystolus =

Genus of cricket-like animals

Platystolus is a genus of European bush crickets in the tribe Ephippigerini, first described by Ignacio Bolívar in 1878. To date (2022), species have only been recorded from France and the Iberian Peninsula.

== Species ==
The Orthoptera Species File lists:

1. Platystolus martinezii (Bolívar, 1873)
2. Platystolus surcularius (Bolívar, 1877) - type species (as Ephippiger surcularius Bolívar)

Note: other species have been included in this genus, but may be misplaced.
