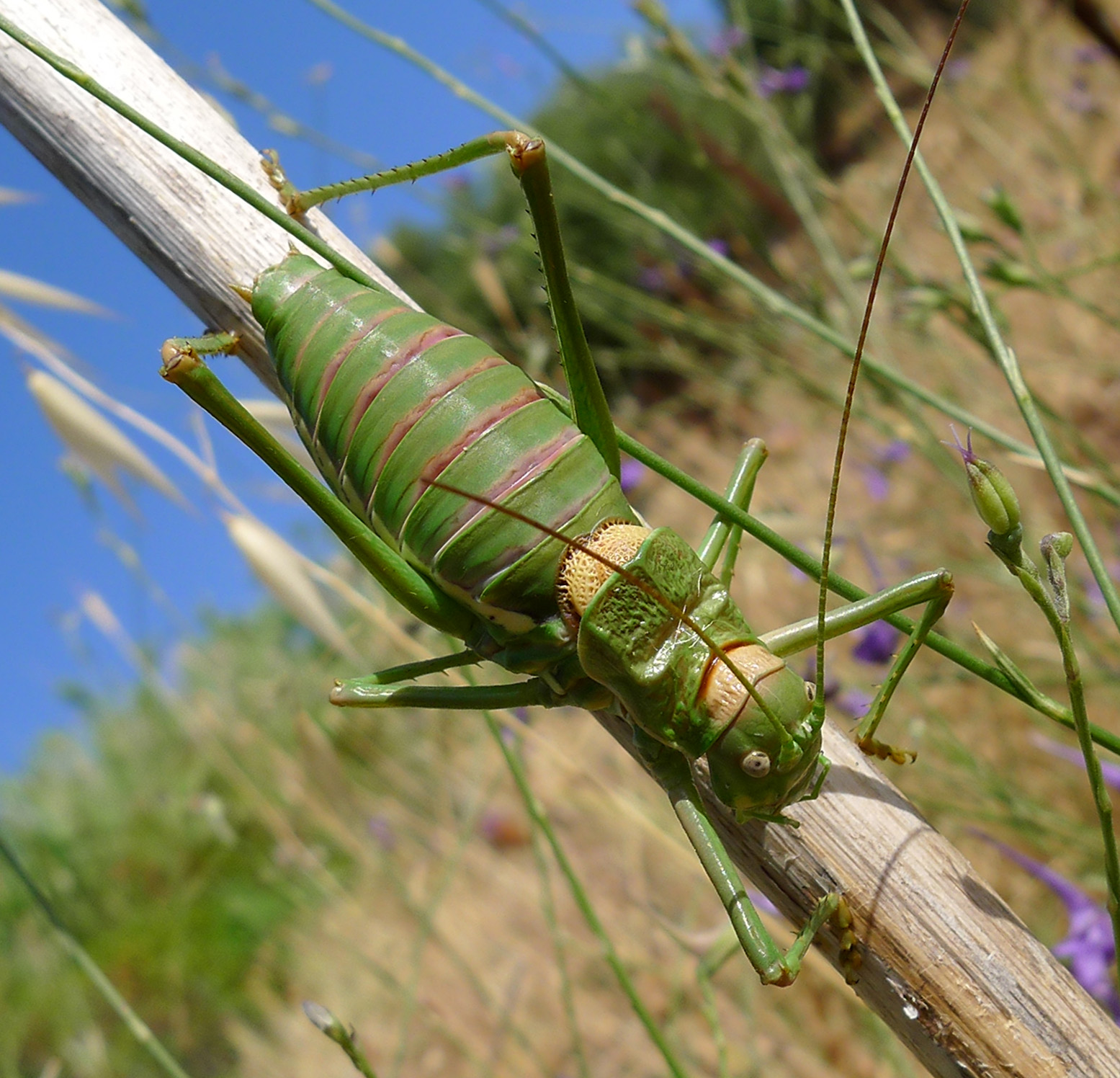
- Steropleurus andalusius male
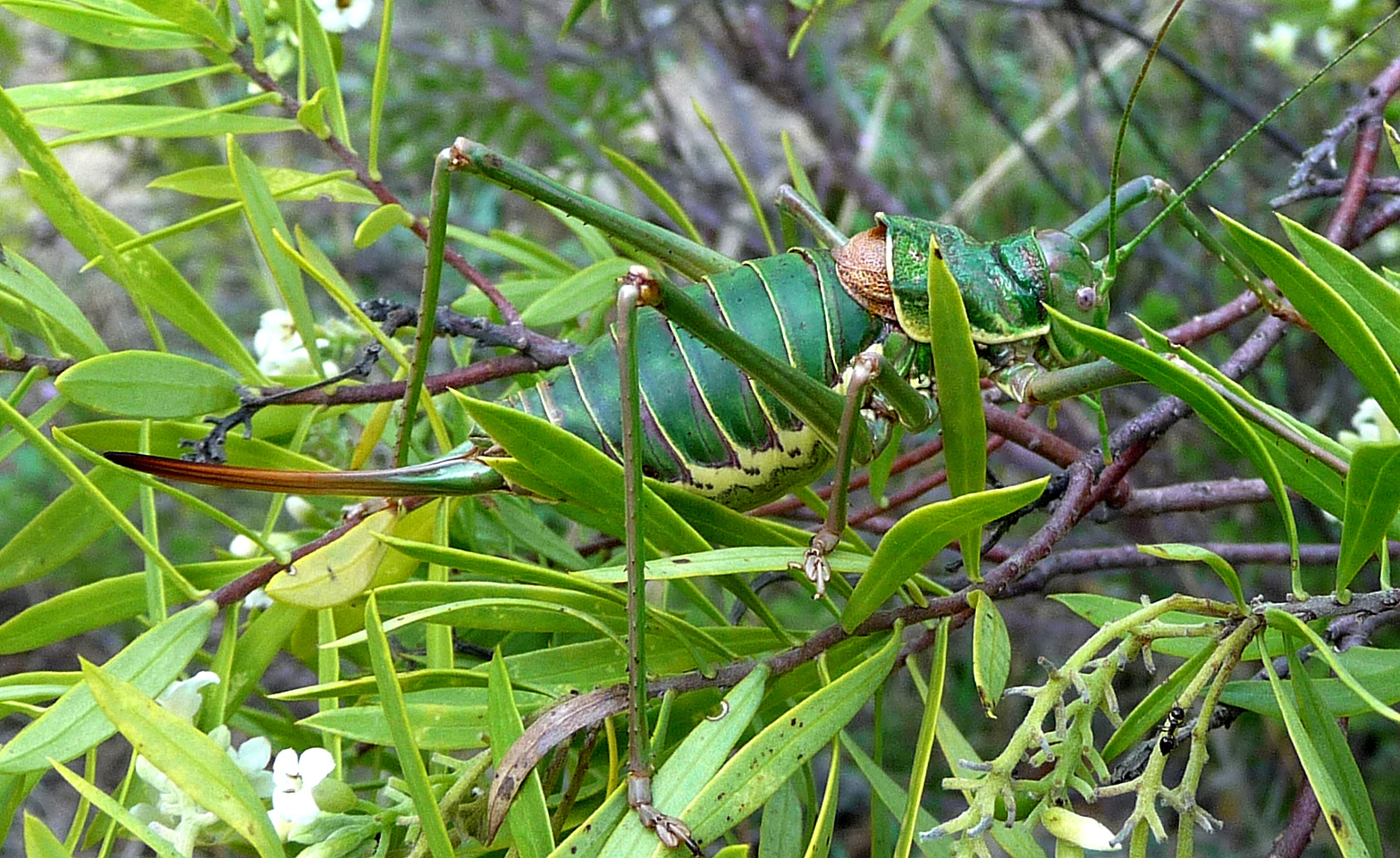
- Steropleurus andalusius female

Scientific classification
- Kingdom: Animalia
- Phylum: Arthropoda
- Clade: Pancrustacea
- Class: Insecta
- Order: Orthoptera
- Suborder: Ensifera
- Family: Tettigoniidae
- Subfamily: Bradyporinae
- Tribe: Ephippigerini
- Genus: Steropleurus; Bolívar, 1878

= Steropleurus =

Genus of cricket-like animals

Steropleurus is a genus of European bush crickets in the tribe Ephippigerini, first described by Ignacio Bolívar in 1878 as Ephippiger (Steropleurus). To date (2022), species have only been recorded from the Iberian Peninsula.

== Species ==
The Orthoptera Species File lists:

1. Steropleurus andalusius (Rambur, 1838) (2 subspecies)
2. Steropleurus brunnerii (Bolívar, 1877) - type species (as Ephippiger brunnerii Bolívar)
3. Steropleurus castellanus (Bolívar, 1878)
4. Steropleurus flavovittatus (Bolívar, 1878)
5. Steropleurus obsoletus (Bolívar, 1898)
6. Steropleurus pseudolus (Bolívar, 1878)
7. Steropleurus recticarinatus (Llorente del Moral, 1980)

Note: Steropleurus catalaunicus, the Catalan Saddle Bush-cricket, is now Sorapagus catalaunicus (Bolívar, 1898)
