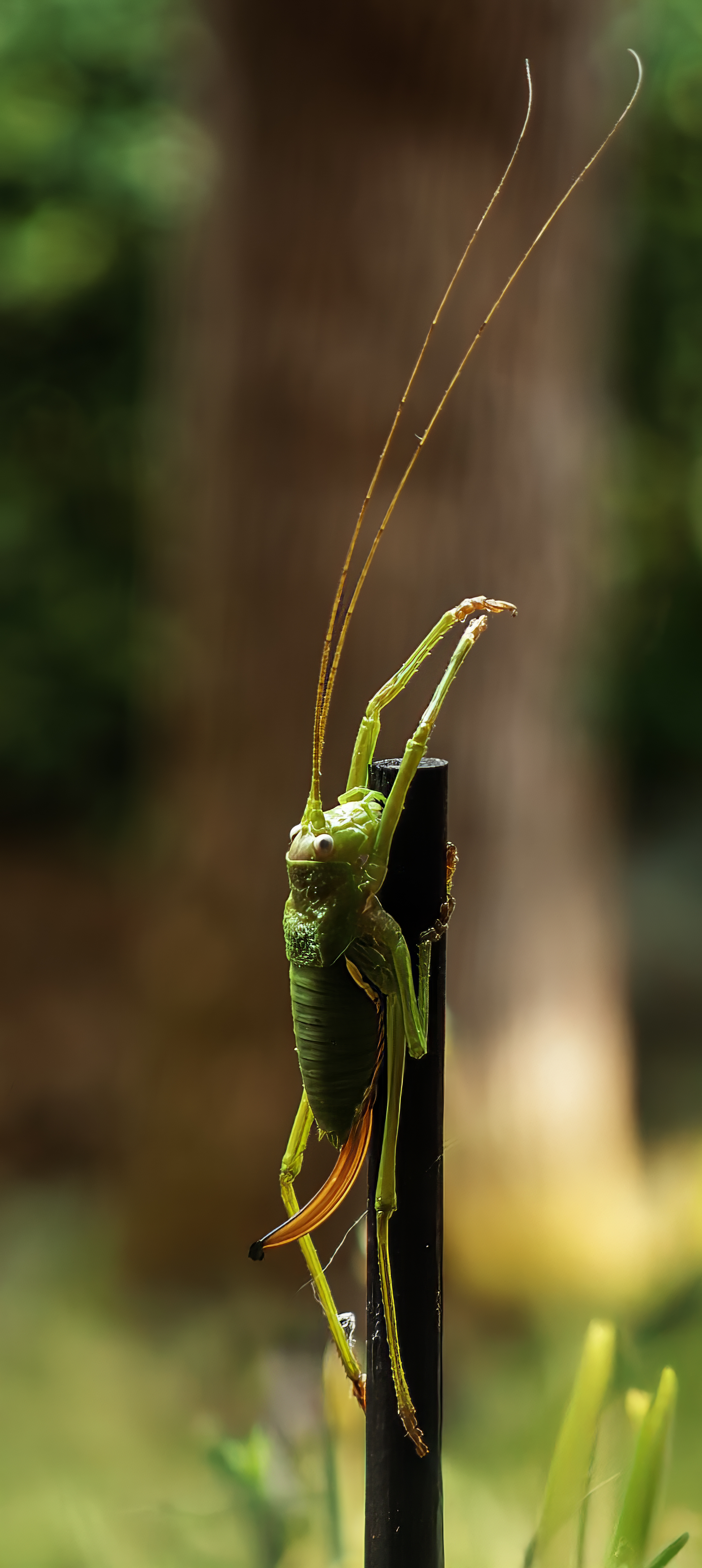
- Uromenus rugosicollis - female

Scientific classification
- Domain: Eukaryota
- Kingdom: Animalia
- Phylum: Arthropoda
- Class: Insecta
- Order: Orthoptera
- Suborder: Ensifera
- Family: Tettigoniidae
- Tribe: Ephippigerini
- Genus: Uromenus; Bolívar, 1878

Type species
- Ephippiger rugosicollis Serville, 1838

Synonyms
- Bolivarius Harz, 1969

= Uromenus =

Genus of cricket-like animals

Uromenus is a genus of bush crickets in the sub-family Bradyporinae and tribe Ephippigerini.

== Distribution and description ==
Species in this genus are found throughout much of mainland Europe and northern Africa. The type species U. rugosicollis occurs in Western Europe and was originally placed in the similar genus Ephippiger; it is distinguished from the latter by its pronotum, which has side keels in rear half, forming a distinct angle between top and sides. These insects are also apterous and the female ovipositors are up-curved towards tip.

== Species ==
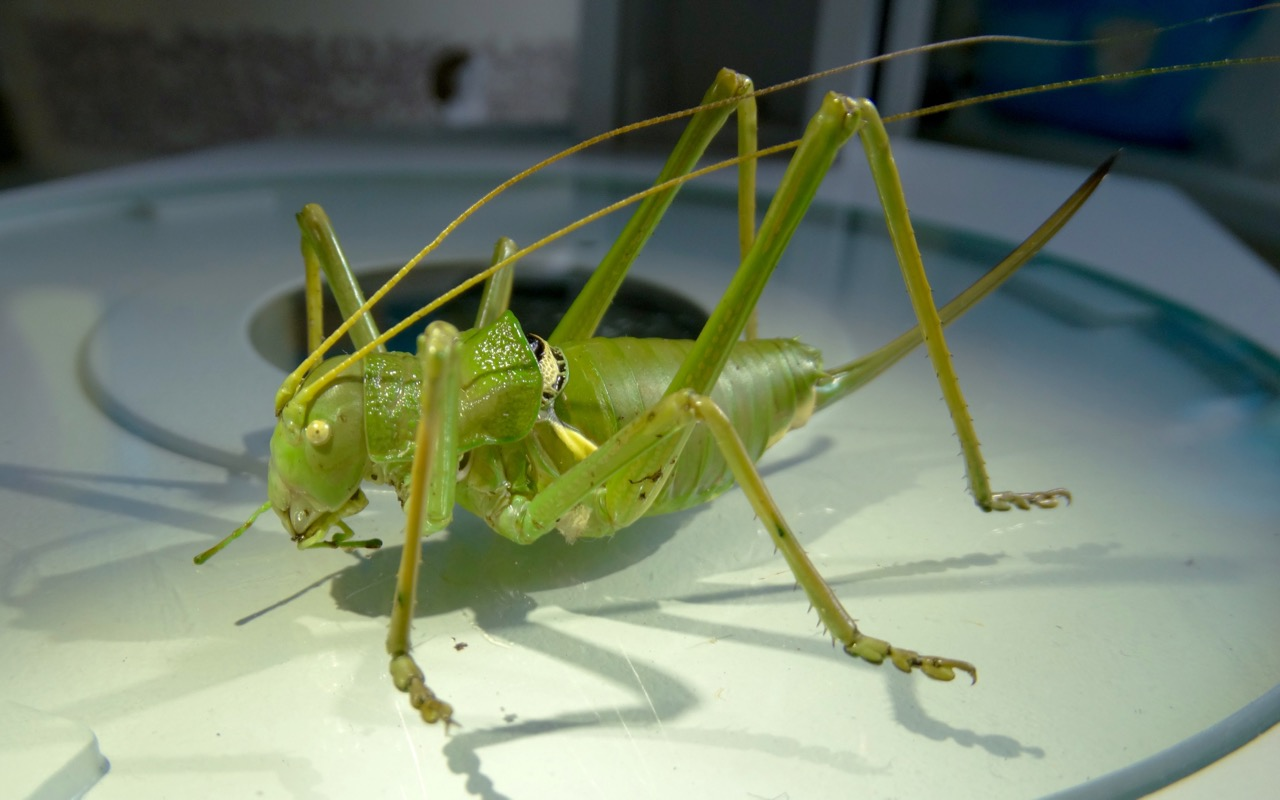
Uromenus agarenus

Orthoptera Species File (OSF) lists:

- Uromenus agarenus (Brunner von Wattenwyl, 1882)
- Uromenus angustelaminatus Chopard, 1939
- Uromenus annae (Targioni-Tozzetti, 1881)
- Uromenus antennatus (Brunner von Wattenwyl, 1882)
- Uromenus bifidus (Werner, 1932)
- Uromenus bonneti Bolívar, 1907
- Uromenus bouiblani (Nadig, 1995)
- Uromenus brevicollis (Fischer, 1853)
- Uromenus chamaeropis Werner, 1931
- Uromenus choumarae Nadig, 1976
- Uromenus cockerelli Uvarov, 1930
- Uromenus compressicollis (Fischer, 1853)
- Uromenus costaticollis (Lucas, 1849)
- Uromenus dyrrhachiacus (Karny, 1918)
- Uromenus elegans (Fischer, 1853)
- Uromenus finoti (Brunner von Wattenwyl, 1882)
- Uromenus galvagnii Nadig, 1994
- Uromenus hastatus (Saussure, 1898)
- Uromenus innocentii (Bonnet & Finot, 1885)
- Uromenus ketamensis (Morales-Agacino, 1950)
- Uromenus laticollis (Lucas, 1849)
- Uromenus lecerfi Chopard, 1937
- Uromenus maroccanus (Saussure, 1898)
- Uromenus mauretanicus (Saussure, 1898)
- Uromenus melillae Nadig, 1994
- Uromenus moulouyae (Nadig, 1995)
- Uromenus pardoi (Morales-Agacino, 1950)
- Uromenus pasquieri Rungs, 1952
- Uromenus peraffinis Werner, 1933
- Uromenus poncyi (Bolívar, 1902)
- Uromenus rhombifer Bolívar, 1908
- Uromenus riggioi La Greca, 1964
- Uromenus robustus (Werner, 1933)
- Uromenus rugosicollis (Serville, 1838) – type species (as Ephippiger rugosicollis)
- Uromenus siculus (Kollar, 1853)
- Uromenus silviae Nadig, 1979
- Uromenus theryi Werner, 1934
- Uromenus tobboganensis Nadig, 1994
- Uromenus trochleatus Chopard, 1937
- Uromenus vaucherianus (Saussure, 1898)
- Uromenus vindti (Rungs, 1952)
- Uromenus vosseleri (Krauss, 1893)

One species group is listed in OSF: the Uromenus poncyi species group, which contains U. poncyi, U. angustelaminatus, and U. silviae.
