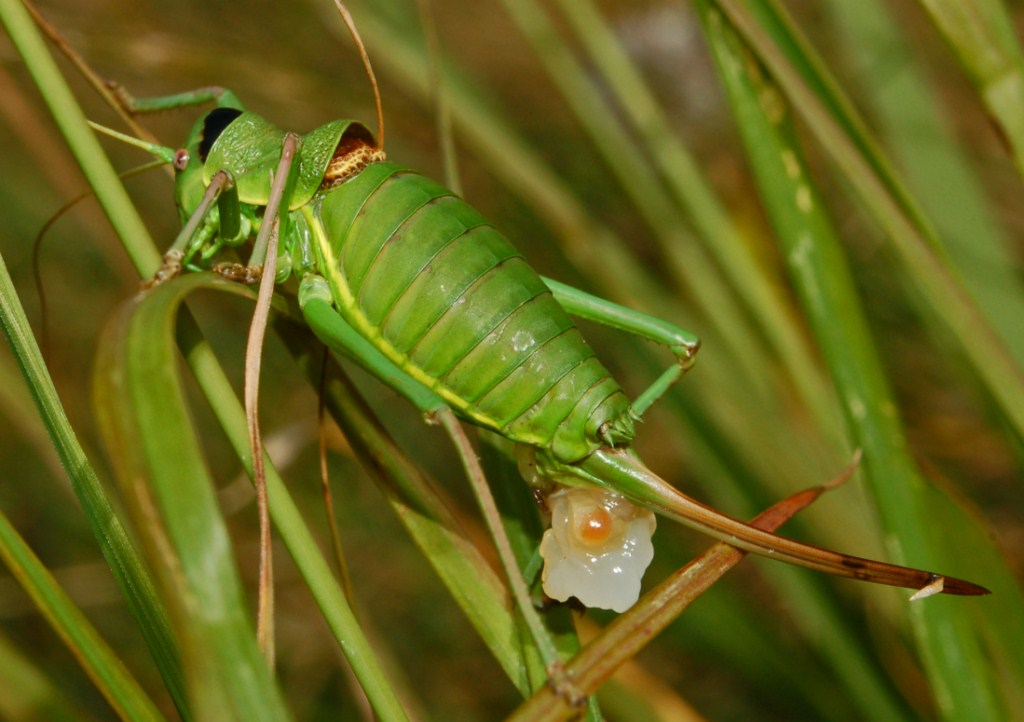
- Ephippiger perforatus female with spermatophore

Scientific classification
- Kingdom: Animalia
- Phylum: Arthropoda
- Class: Insecta
- Order: Orthoptera
- Suborder: Ensifera
- Family: Tettigoniidae
- Subfamily: Bradyporinae; Burmeister, 1838

Synonyms
- Bradyporidae Burmeister, 1838; Bradyporites Burmeister, 1838; Callimenidae Brunner von Wattenwyl, 1882; Pycnogastrinae Brunner von Wattenwyl, 1882

= Bradyporinae =

Subfamily of cricket-like animals

The Bradyporinae are a subfamily in the family Tettigoniidae (bush crickets or katydids), based on the type genus Bradyporus. First described as a family, "Bradyporidae" (Burmeister, H., 1838), the first use as Bradyporinae was by Brunner von Wattenwyl in 1878.

Genera in this subfamily are mostly distributed in Europe, North Africa, through to temperate/subtropical Asia.

== Tribes and genera ==
=== Bradyporini ===
Auth.: Burmeister, 1838; distribution: N. Africa, Europe, western Asia

1. Bradyporus Charpentier, 1825
2. Pycnogaster Graells, 1851

=== Ephippigerini ===
Auth.: Brunner von Wattenwyl, 1878 - selected genera:

- Baetica Bolivar, I., 1903 - monotypic
- Callicrania Bolívar, 1898
- Ephippiger Berthold, 1827
- Ephippigerida Bolivar, 1903
- Neocallicrania Pfau, 1996
- Platystolus Bolívar, 1878
- Steropleurus Bolivar, 1878
- Uromenus Bolivar, 1878

=== Zichyini ===
Auth.: Bolivar I, 1901; distribution: Asia (mostly temperate)

1. Damalacantha Bei-Bienko, 1951
2. Deracantha Fischer von Waldheim, 1833
3. Deracanthella Bolivar, I., 1901
4. Deracanthina Bei-Bienko, 1951
5. Zichya Bolivar, I., 1901
