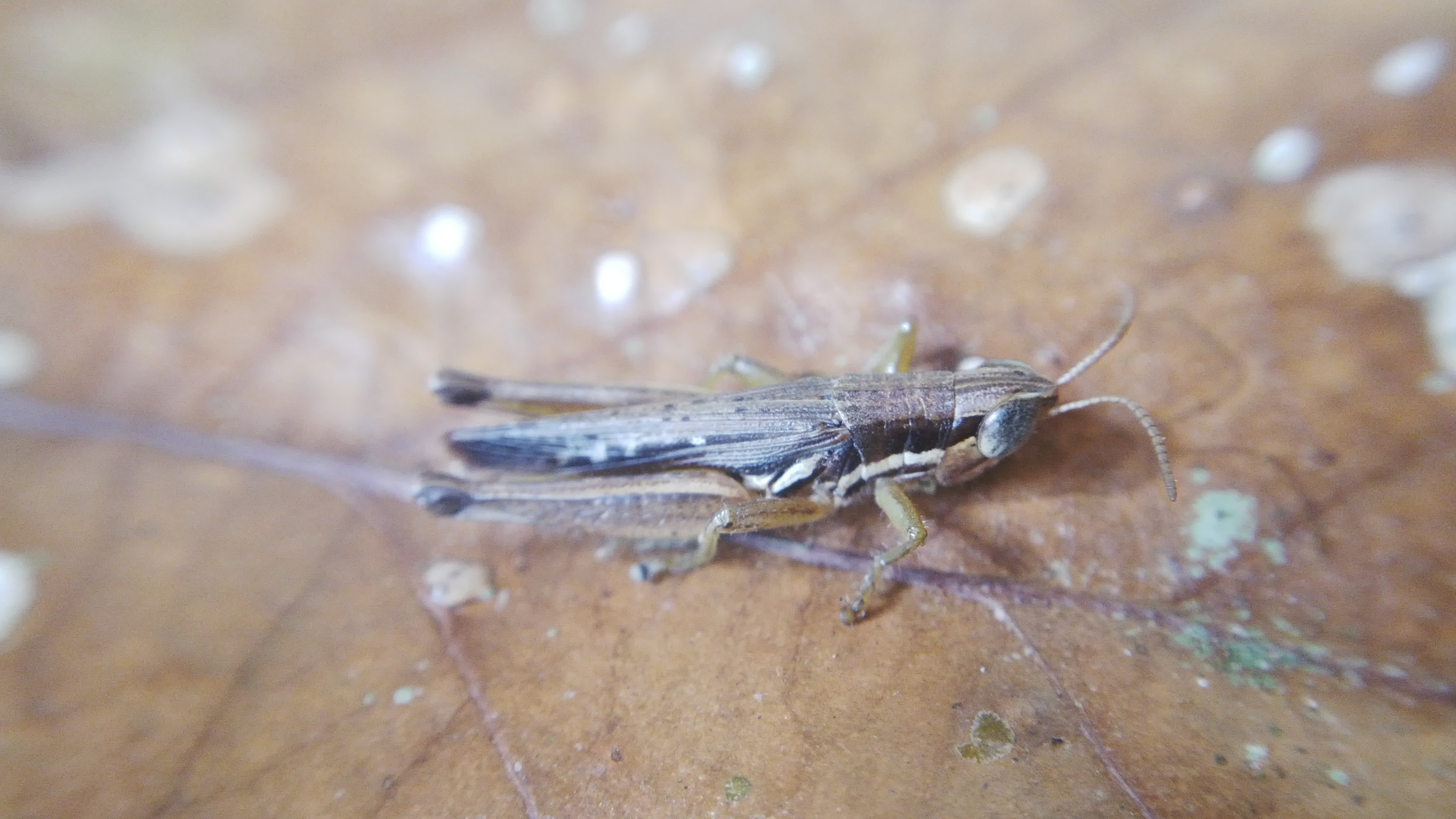
- Spathosternum prasiniferum, Vietnam

Scientific classification
- Kingdom: Animalia
- Phylum: Arthropoda
- Clade: Pancrustacea
- Class: Insecta
- Order: Orthoptera
- Suborder: Caelifera
- Family: Acrididae
- Subfamily: Spathosterninae
- Genus: Spathosternum
- Species: S. prasiniferum

Binomial name
- Spathosternum prasiniferum (Walker, 1871)

= Spathosternum prasiniferum =

Species of short-horned grasshopper

Spathosternum prasiniferum is a species of short-horned grasshopper in the family Acrididae. It is found in Indomalaya.

== Subspecies ==
These subspecies belong to the species Spathosternum prasiniferum:

- Spathosternum prasiniferum prasiniferum (Walker, 1871)
- Spathosternum prasiniferum sinense Uvarov, 1931
- Spathosternum prasiniferum xizangensis Yin, 1982
- Spathosternum prasiniferum yunnanense Wei & Zheng, 2005

== Description ==
- Colour: Generally greenish in fresh material; a broad characteristic black band running from behind eyes to pronotum along lateral carinae; tegmina light brown with longitudinal central pale marking; wings hyaline, clouded towards apex; hind femur greenish or rufotestaceous; hind tibia green.
- Head: Convex; fastigium rounded with lateral carinulae slightly raised, more pronounced in males; foveolae obsolete; weak median carina extending over vertex; frontal ridge narrow, parallel sided, sulcated throughout; antenna 21 segmented, shorter than head and pronotum taken together.
- Mesosoma: Pronotum flat, tricarinate, three sulci present, median carina traversed only by hind sulci; prozona almost equal to metazona; posterior margin of pronotum angulated; prosternal process antero-posteriorly compressed, bilobed, inclined backwards, base narrower; mesosternal lobes separate; metasternal lobes contiguous; hind tibia long, hardly dilated, 10-11 spines apart from apical one.
- Metasoma: Cerci short, cylindrical; supra-anal plate blunt with longitudinal groove.
