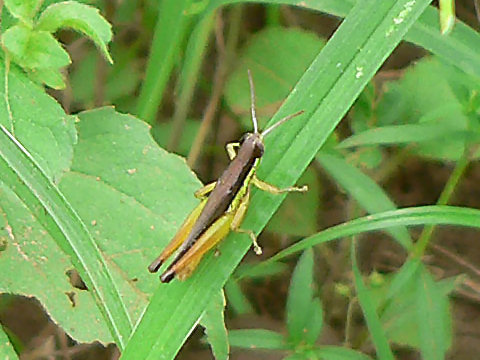
- Spathosternum pygmaeum male

Scientific classification
- Kingdom: Animalia
- Phylum: Arthropoda
- Clade: Pancrustacea
- Class: Insecta
- Order: Orthoptera
- Suborder: Caelifera
- Family: Acrididae
- Subfamily: Spathosterninae
- Genus: Spathosternum; Krauss, 1877

= Spathosternum =

Genus of grasshoppers

Spathosternum is a genus of grasshoppers in the family Acrididae: subfamily Spathosterninae, with species found in Africa, including Madagascar and tropical Asia.

== Species ==
The Catalogue of Life lists:

- Spathosternum abbreviatum Uvarov, 1929
- Spathosternum brevipenne Chopard, 1958
- Spathosternum curtum Uvarov, 1953
- Spathosternum malagassum Dirsh, 1962
- Spathosternum nigrotaeniatum Stål, 1876 - type species (as Tristria nigro-taeniata Stål)
- Spathosternum planoantennatum Ingrisch, 1986
- Spathosternum prasiniferum Walker, 1871
- Spathosternum pygmaeum Karsch, 1893
- Spathosternum venulosum Stål, 1878
