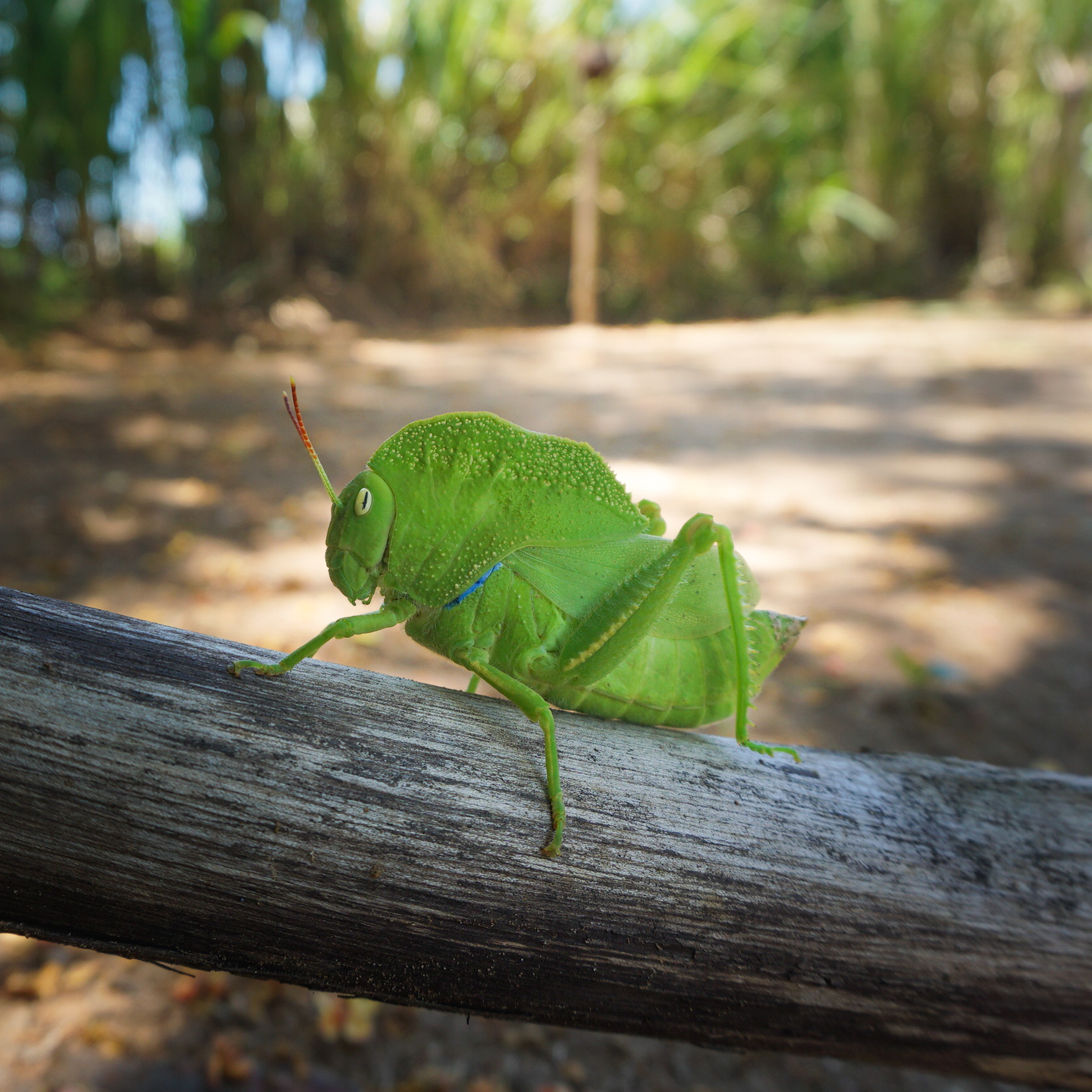

Scientific classification
- Kingdom: Animalia
- Phylum: Arthropoda
- Class: Insecta
- Order: Orthoptera
- Suborder: Caelifera
- Family: Acrididae
- Genus: Teratodes
- Species: T. monticollis

Binomial name
- Teratodes monticollis Gray, 1832

Synonyms
- Gryllus foliatus Herbst, 1803

= Teratodes monticollis =

Species of grasshopper

Teratodes monticollis is the type species of grasshoppers in the genus Teratodes (subfamily Teratodinae) and is found in India, the Laccadive Islands and Sri Lanka. It was described by the English zoologist George Robert Gray in 1832 as Gryllus monticollis.

== Gallery ==
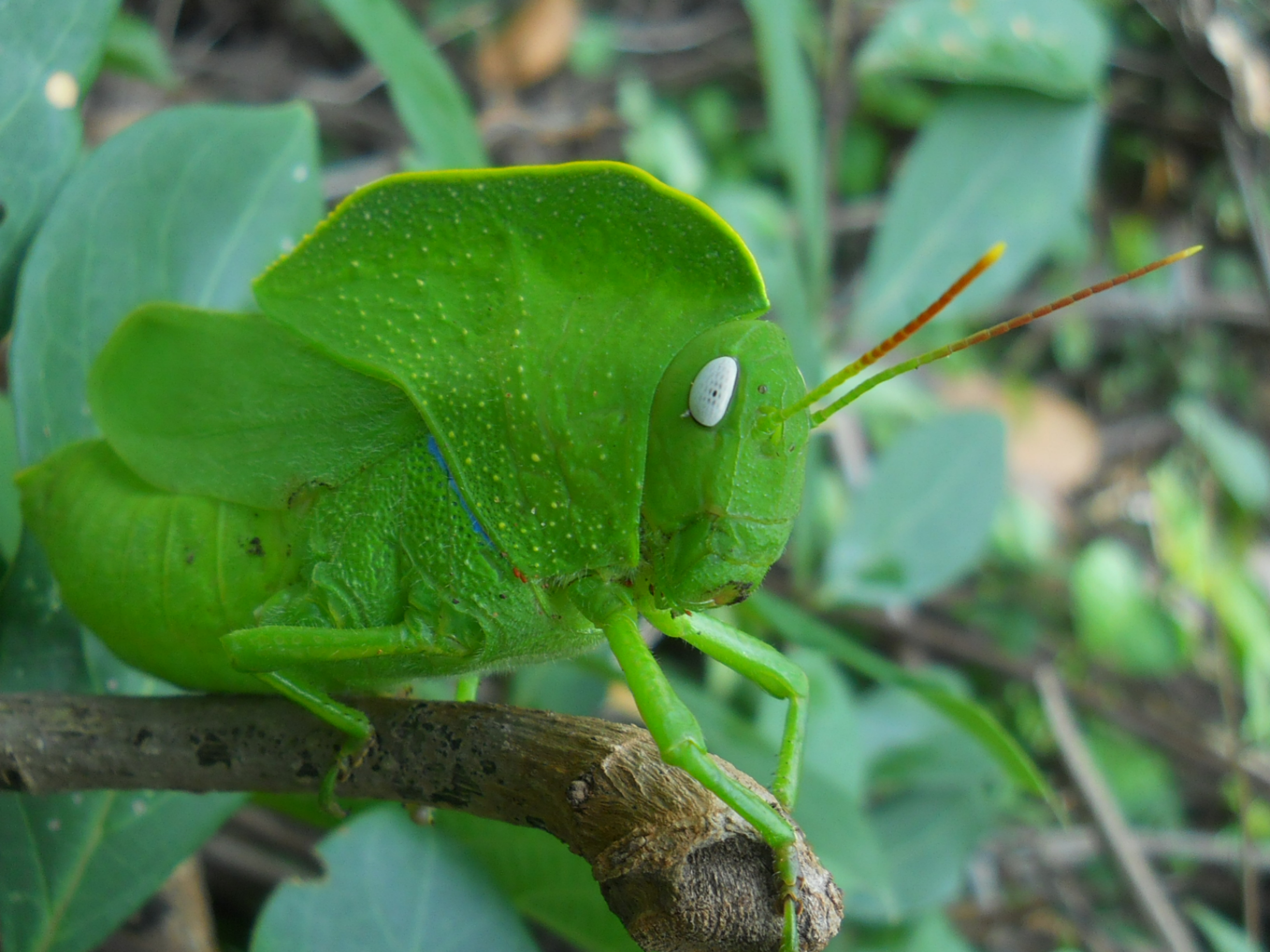

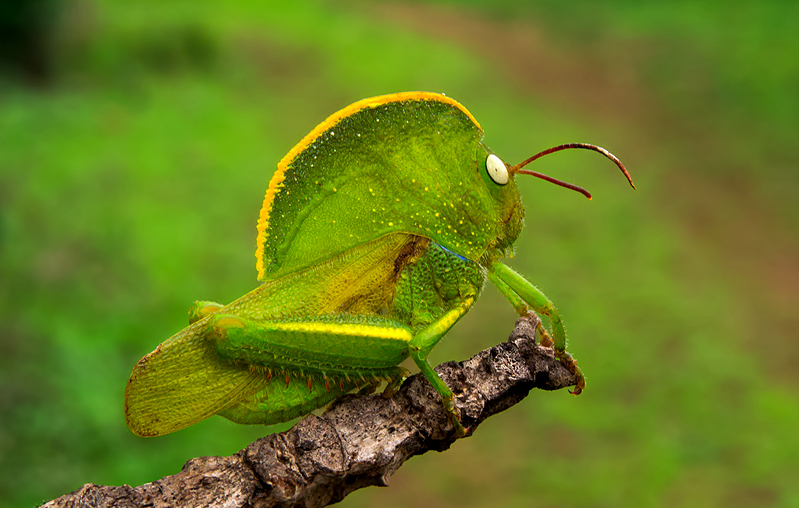

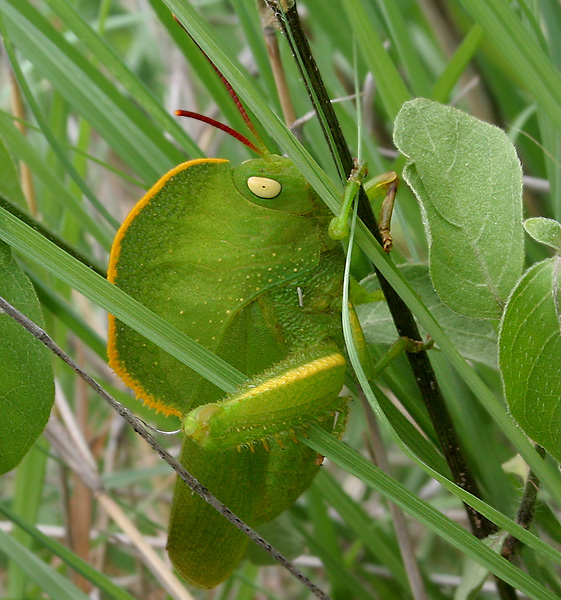

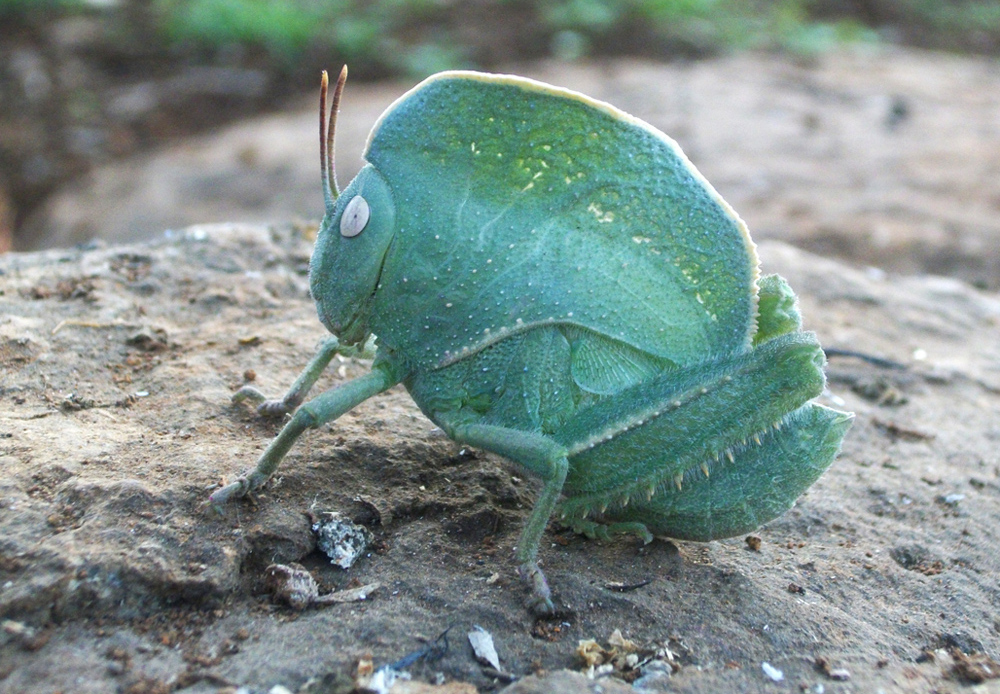
