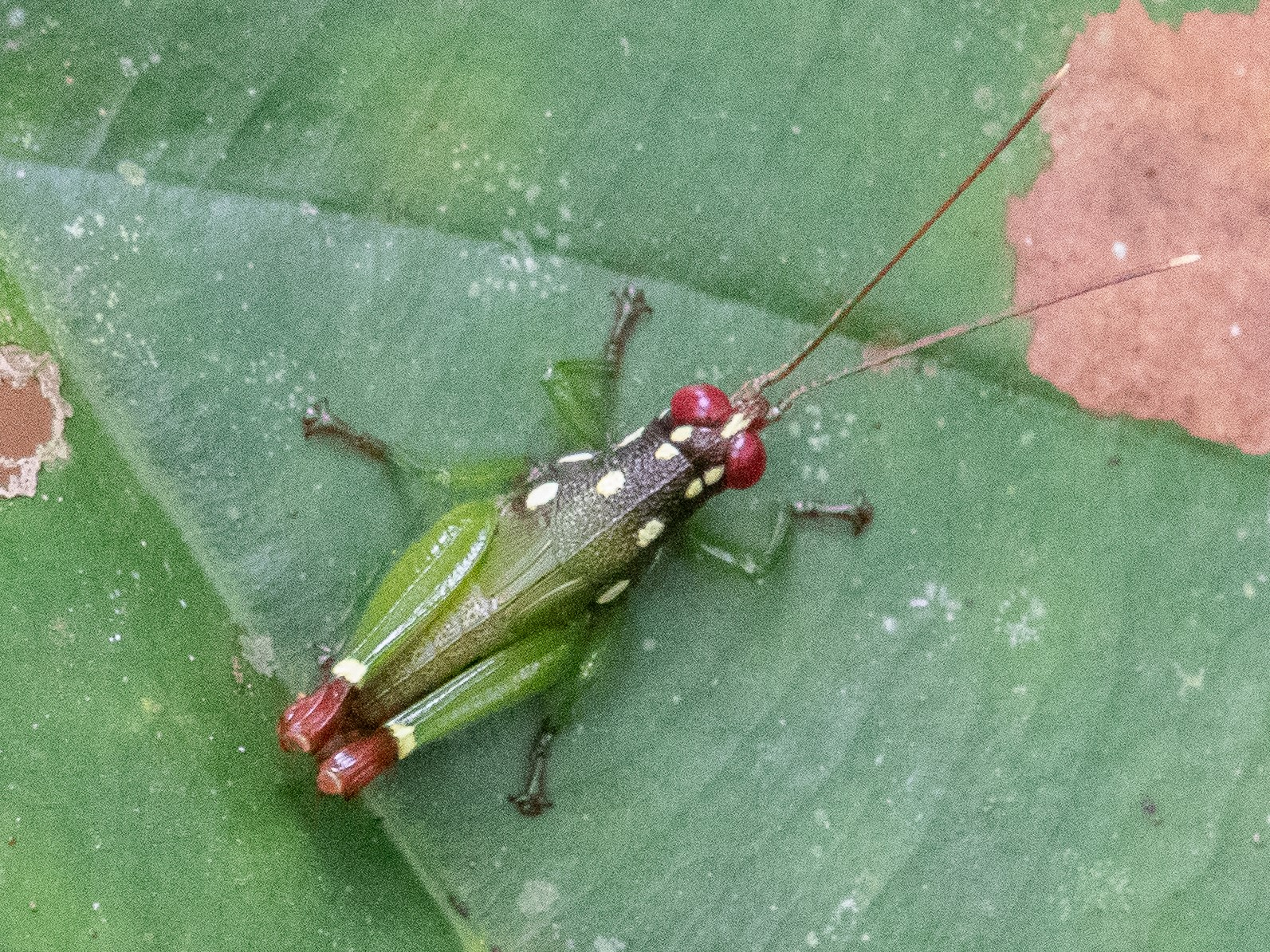
- Bettotania maculata

Scientific classification
- Kingdom: Animalia
- Phylum: Arthropoda
- Clade: Pancrustacea
- Class: Insecta
- Order: Orthoptera
- Suborder: Caelifera
- Family: Acrididae
- Subfamily: Incolacridinae
- Genus: Bettotania; Willemse, 1933

Synonyms
- Paracelebesia Miller, 1935

= Bettotania =

Genus of grasshoppers

Bettotania is a genus of grasshoppers in the subfamily Incolacridinae, not assigned to any tribe. Species have been recorded from Peninsular Malaysia and Borneo.

== Species ==
The Orthoptera Species File lists:

- Bettotania cinctifemur (Miller, 1935)
- Bettotania festiva (Miller, 1935)
- Bettotania flavostriata Willemse, 1963
- Bettotania maculata Willemse, 1933 - type species

Note: B. asymmetrica Ingrisch, 1989 has been moved to the new genus Asymmetritania.
