= Stolzia =

Stolzia may refer to:

- Stolzia (insect), a genus of grasshoppers in the family Acrididae
- Stolzia (plant), a genus of plants in the family Orchidaceae
