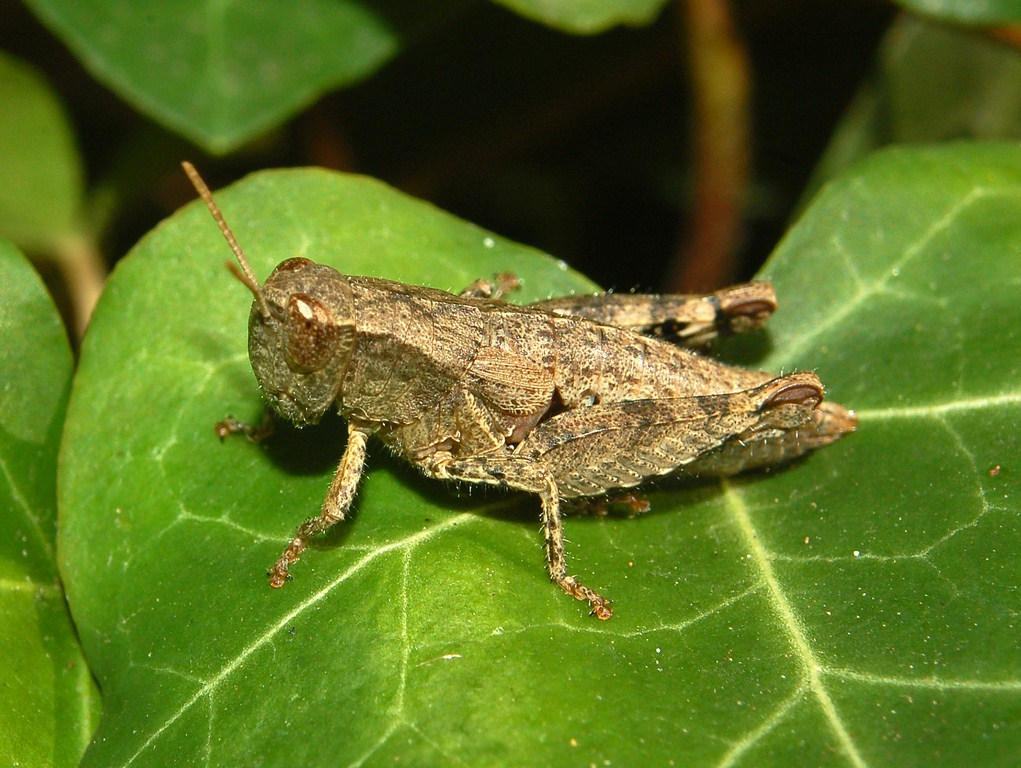

Scientific classification
- Domain: Eukaryota
- Kingdom: Animalia
- Phylum: Arthropoda
- Class: Insecta
- Order: Orthoptera
- Suborder: Caelifera
- Superfamily: Acridoidea
- Family: Acrididae
- Subfamily: Pezotettiginae
- Genus: Pezotettix
- Species: P. giornae

Binomial name
- Pezotettix giornae Rossi, 1794

Synonyms
- List: Gryllus giornae Rossi, 1794; Pezotettix communis (Costa Lima, 1836); Pezotettix giornai Jacobson, G. G., 1905; Pezotettix rufipes (Brunner von Wattenwyl, 1882); Pezotettix rufitarsis Navas, 1909; Platyphyma rufipe Brunner von Wattenwyl, 1882; Podisma communis Costa, O.G., 1836

= Pezotettix giornae =

Species of grasshopper

Pezotettix giornae is a species of 'short-horned grasshoppers' belonging to the subfamily Pezotettiginae (similar to and previously placed in the Catantopinae).

== Distribution ==
This very little grasshopper is present in Southern Europe (and parts of Central Europe), North Africa and in the Near East.

== Habitat ==
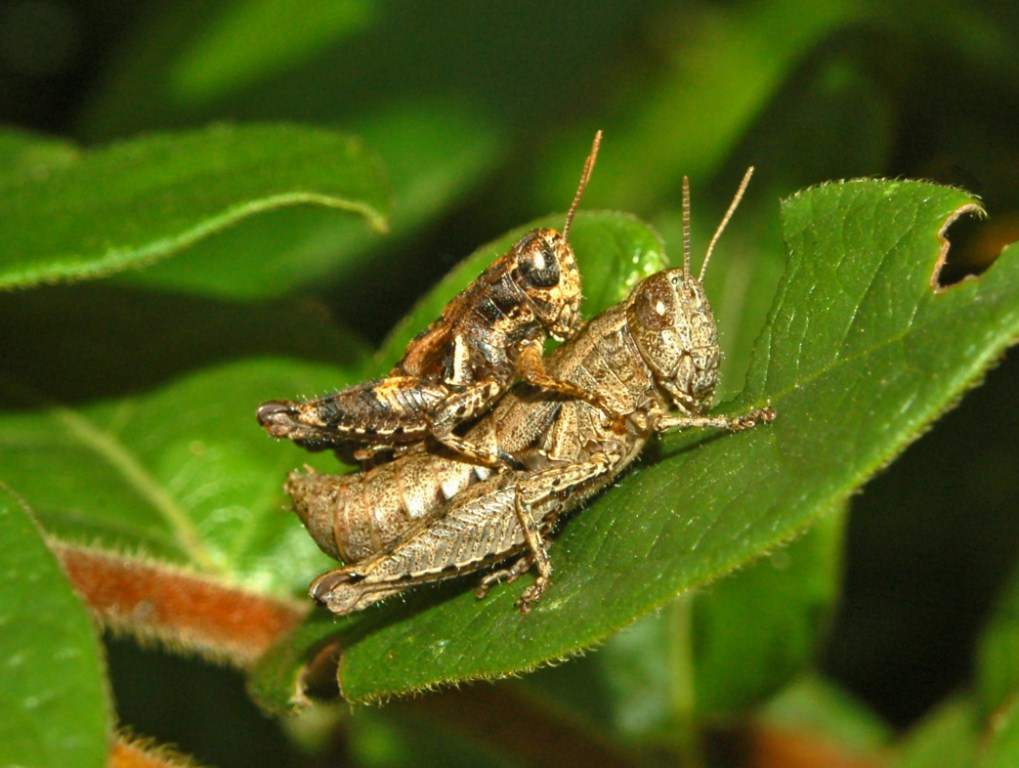
''Pezotettix giornae, mating couple

This species inhabits meadows of lowlands, forest edges, xerotherm areas of plains and southern slopes of stony mountains.

== Description ==
The adult males grow up to 11–14 millimetres (0.43–0.55 in) long, while the females reach 12–18 millimetres (0.47–0.71 in) of length. The basic coloration of the body varies from light brown to greyish. The eyes are relatively large and the sides of thorax sometimes show a white or darker longitudinal stripe. The wings are scaly, oval, very short, reaching only the middle of the second rear segment, so they are unable to fly and resemble nymphs (brachyptery). Nymphs are usually green in the early stages.

== Biology ==
This immature stages of this species develop in summer, passing through six instars. Adults can be encountered from June through November in the Mediterranean. They mate in autumn and in winter and often overwinter as adults. In this case they can be found by March.
