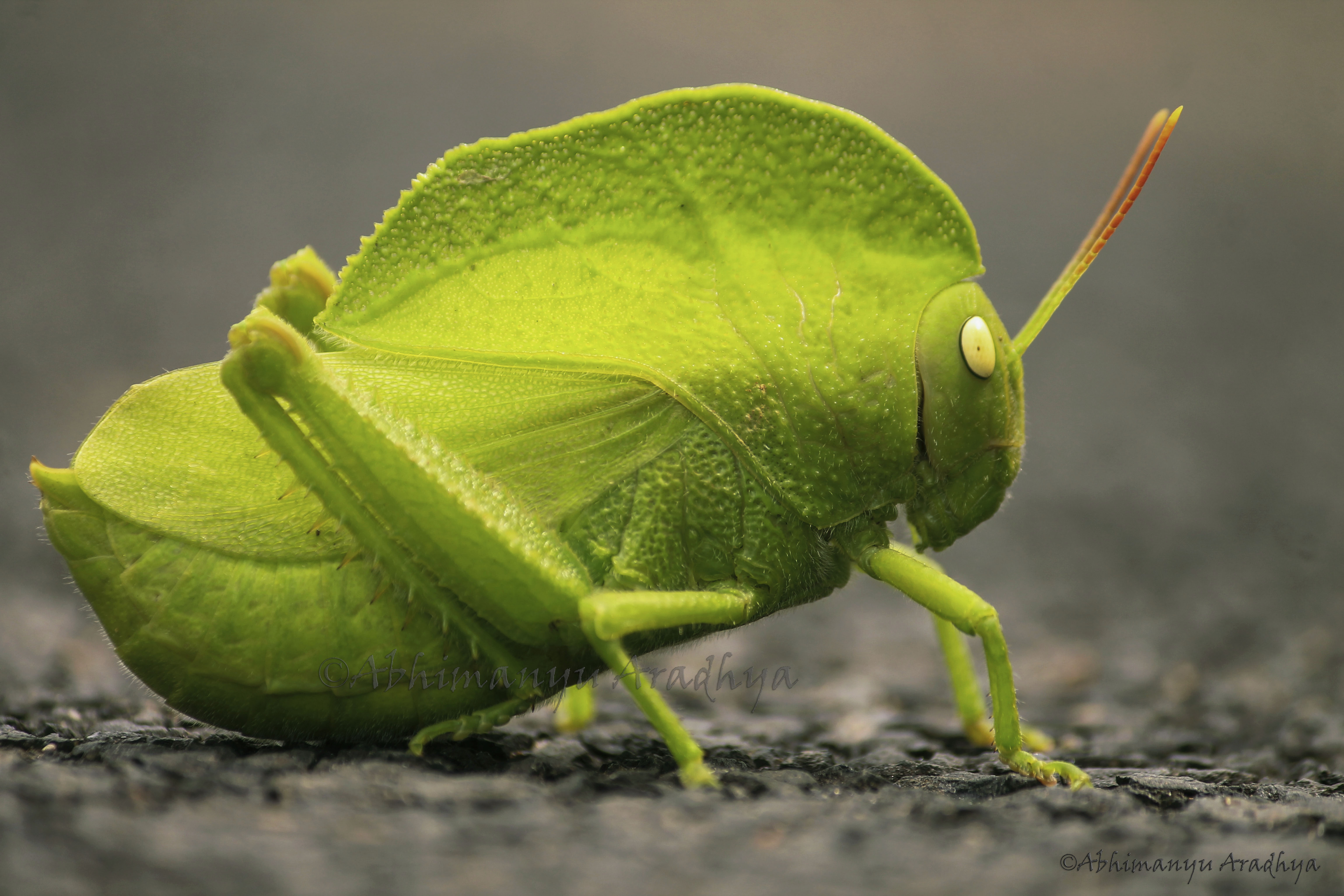

Scientific classification
- Kingdom: Animalia
- Phylum: Arthropoda
- Class: Insecta
- Order: Orthoptera
- Suborder: Caelifera
- Nanorder: Acridomorpha
- Superfamily: Acridoidea
- Family: Acrididae
- Subfamily: Teratodinae
- Genus: Teratodes; Brullé, 1835

= Teratodes =

Hooded grasshopper

Genus of grasshoppers

Teratodes is the type genus of grasshoppers in the subfamily Teratodinae; species are native to India and Sri Lanka and are sometimes known as hooded grasshoppers. It was established by the French entomologist Gaspard Auguste Brullé in 1835.

Hooded grasshoppers feed on tree leaves, and they can become serious pests of teak and sandalwood. Both the nymphs and adults of the species are dull green in color. The pronotum expands into a large sharp "hood" structure edged with yellow-orange, giving them the general appearance of a leaf.

== Species ==
As of 2025, the following are listed in the Orthoptera Species File:

1. Teratodes brachypterus Carl, 1916 - South eastern India
2. Teratodes monticollis (Gray, 1832) - type species

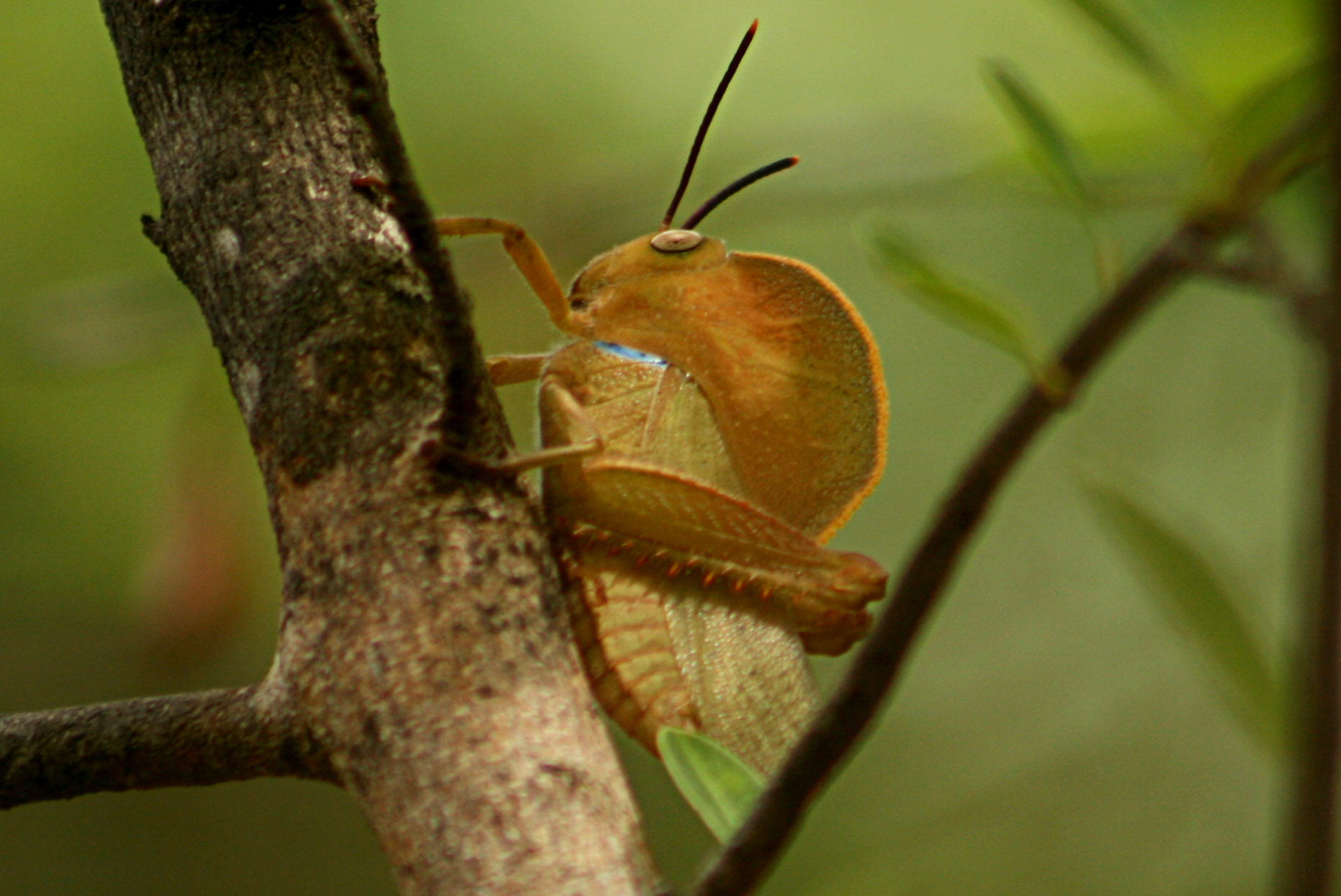
Teratodes sp.
