= Egnatius apicalis =

Scientific classification
- Kingdom: Animalia
- Phylum: Arthropoda
- Clade: Pancrustacea
- Class: Insecta
- Order: Orthoptera
- Suborder: Caelifera
- Family: Acrididae
- Subfamily: Egnatiinae
- Tribe: Egnatiini
- Genus: Egnatius; Stål, 1876
- Species: E. apicalis

Binomial name
- Egnatius apicalis Stål, 1876

Species of insect

Egnatius is a monotypic genus of grasshoppers belonging to the family Acrididae. The only species is Egnatius apicalis.
