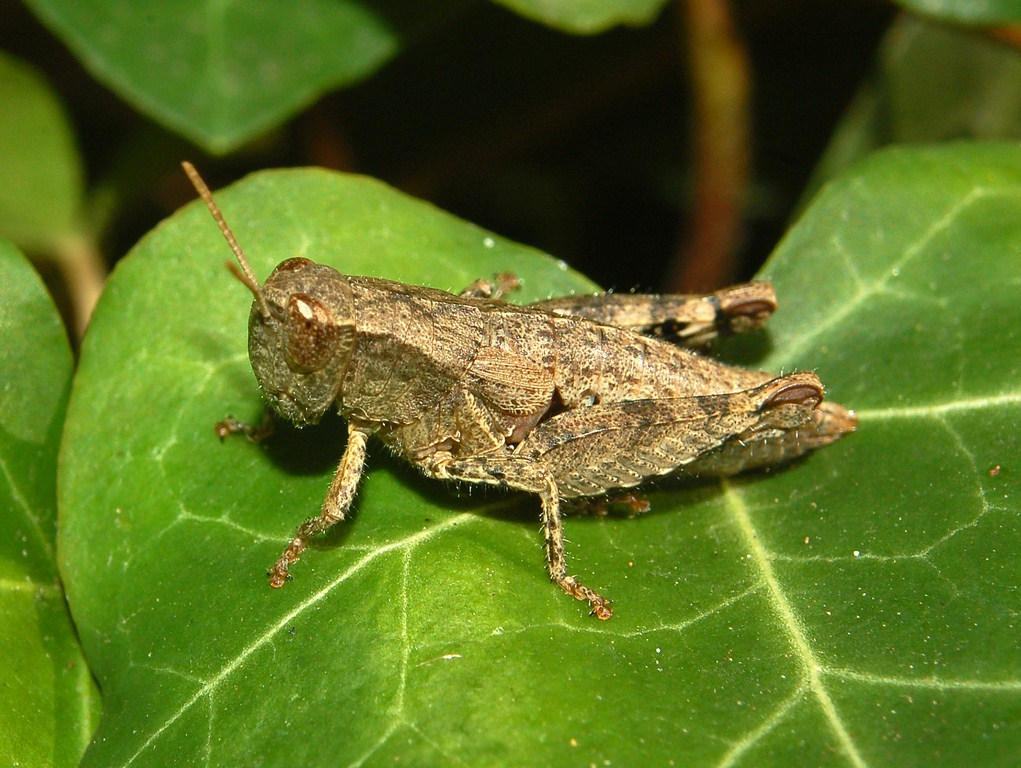
- Pezotettix giornae

Scientific classification
- Kingdom: Animalia
- Phylum: Arthropoda
- Class: Insecta
- Order: Orthoptera
- Suborder: Caelifera
- Family: Acrididae
- Subfamily: Pezotettiginae
- Genus: Pezotettix; Burmeister, 1840

Synonyms
- Pegotettix Dodge, 1876; Pelecycleis Fieber, 1853; Pelecyclus Fieber, 1853; Pezotettis Targioni-Tozzetti, 1881; Platyphyma Fischer, 1853

= Pezotettix =

Genus of grasshoppers

Pezotettix is a genus of 'short-horned grasshoppers' belonging to the family Acrididae subfamily Pezotettiginae (similar to and previously placed in the Catantopinae).

== Distribution ==
The species belonging to this genus are present in most of Europe, in the Near East and in North Africa.

== Species ==
The Orthoptera Species File currently (2023) includes:

1. Pezotettix anatolica Uvarov, 1934
2. Pezotettix cotti Dirsh, 1949
3. Pezotettix curvicerca Uvarov, 1934
4. Pezotettix cypria Dirsh, 1949
5. Pezotettix giornae Rossi, 1794 - type species (as Gryllus giornae Rossi)
6. Pezotettix judaica Uvarov, 1934
7. Pezotettix lagoi Jannone, 1936
8. Pezotettix platycerca Stål, 1876
9. Pezotettix sorbinii Massa & Fontana, 1998
