= Incolacris =

Scientific classification
- Kingdom: Animalia
- Phylum: Arthropoda
- Clade: Pancrustacea
- Class: Insecta
- Order: Orthoptera
- Suborder: Caelifera
- Family: Acrididae
- Subfamily: Incolacridinae
- Genus: Incolacris; Willemse, 1932

Synonyms
- Stolzia (4 spp.)

Genus of grasshoppers

Incolacris is the type genus of grasshoppers in the subfamily Incolacridinae (previously the tribe Incolacridini Tinkham, 1940). To date, species have been recorded from China, the Philippines and Peninsular Malaysia.

Four species of Incolacris have been also placed in the subfamily Catantopinae and genus Stolzia, but the original name was revived in 2021 as part of a review of tribe Incolacridini.

== Species ==
The Orthoptera Species File lists:

1. Incolacris flavomaculata Willemse, 1939
2. Incolacris hainanensis Tinkham, 1940
3. Incolacris jianfengensis (Zheng & Ma, 1989)
4. Incolacris rubritarsi Willemse, 1932 - type species - locality Siargao, Philippines
5. Incolacris trifasciata Willemse, 1932
