= Euryphymus =

Scientific classification
- Kingdom: Animalia
- Phylum: Arthropoda
- Clade: Pancrustacea
- Class: Insecta
- Order: Orthoptera
- Suborder: Caelifera
- Family: Acrididae
- Subfamily: Euryphyminae
- Genus: Euryphymus; Stål, 1873

Synonyms
- Ostracina Saussure, 1888

Genus of grasshoppers

Euryphymus is the type genus of grasshoppers in the subfamily Euryphyminae, erected by Carl Stål in 1873 as a subgenus of "Calliptenus" (Euryphymus). Species have been recorded from southern Africa and Madagascar (although the known distribution may be incomplete).

== Species ==
A key to most species was given by Uvarov. The Orthoptera Species File includes:

1. Euryphymus eremobioides Bolívar, 1889
2. Euryphymus exemptus (Walker, 1870)
3. Euryphymus haematopus (Linnaeus, 1758) - type species (as Gryllus haematopus Linnaeus, by subsequent designation)
4. Euryphymus kalahariensis Barker, 1985
5. Euryphymus tuberculatus Martínez y Fernández-Castillo, 1898
6. Euryphymus xanthocnemis Brancsik, 1897
