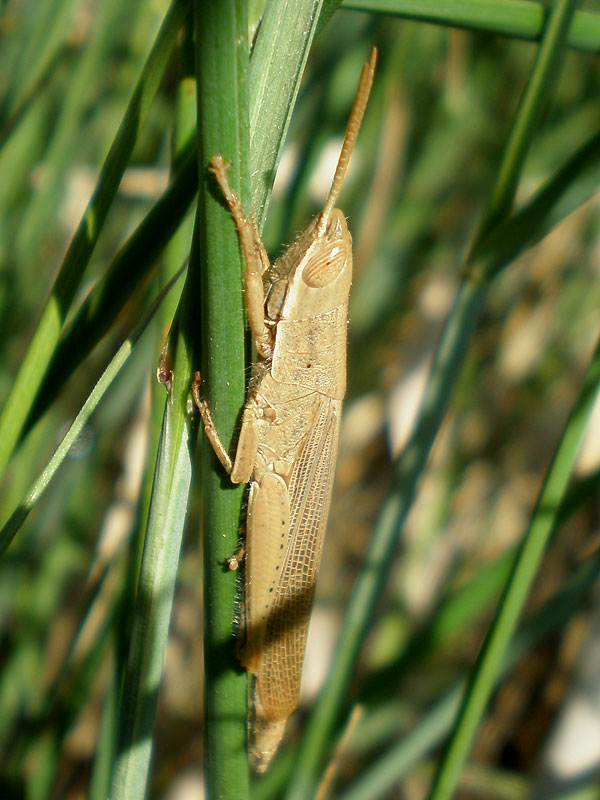
- Tropidopola cylindrica

Scientific classification
- Kingdom: Animalia
- Phylum: Arthropoda
- Clade: Pancrustacea
- Class: Insecta
- Order: Orthoptera
- Suborder: Caelifera
- Family: Acrididae
- Subfamily: Tropidopolinae
- Genus: Tropidopola; Stål, 1873

Synonyms
- Opsomala Fieber, 1853

= Tropidopola =

Genus of grasshoppers

Tropidopola is a genus of grasshoppers, erected by Carl Stål in 1873. It is the type genus of the monotypic tribe Tropidopolini and the subfamily Tropidopolinae. Species are distributed in: central-northern Africa, southern Europe and Asia: near East, India up to Siberia.

== Species ==
The Orthoptera Species File lists:

1. Tropidopola cylindrica (Marschall, 1836) - type species (as Opsomala fasciculata Charpentier = T. cylindrica cylindrica, one of 4 subspecies)
2. Tropidopola daurica Uvarov, 1926
3. Tropidopola graeca Uvarov, 1926
4. Tropidopola longicornis (Fieber, 1853)
5. Tropidopola nigerica Uvarov, 1937
6. Tropidopola syriaca (Walker, 1871)
7. Tropidopola turanica Uvarov, 1926
