= Tylotropidiopsis =

Scientific classification
- Domain: Eukaryota
- Kingdom: Animalia
- Phylum: Arthropoda
- Class: Insecta
- Order: Orthoptera
- Suborder: Caelifera
- Informal group: Acridomorpha
- Superfamily: Acridoidea
- Family: Acrididae
- Genus: Tylotropidiopsis; Storozhenko, 1992
- Species: T. abrepta

Binomial name
- Tylotropidiopsis abrepta Storozhenko, 1992

Genus of grasshoppers

Tylotropidiopsis is a monotypic genus of grasshoppers in the family Acrididae, containing the species Tylotropidiopsis abrepta, which is endemic to Vietnam.

The Orthoptera Species File does not include this genus in any subfamily, although some authorities place it in the Eyprepocnemidinae.
