= Porpax exilis =

Scientific classification
- Kingdom: Plantae
- Clade: Tracheophytes
- Clade: Angiosperms
- Clade: Monocots
- Order: Asparagales
- Family: Orchidaceae
- Subfamily: Epidendroideae
- Genus: Porpax
- Species: P. exilis

Binomial name
- Porpax exilis (Hook.f.) Schuit., Y.P.Ng & H.A.Pedersen

Species of orchid

Porpax exilis is a species of plant within the orchid family. It is native to India.
