= Asymmetritania =

Scientific classification
- Kingdom: Animalia
- Phylum: Arthropoda
- Clade: Pancrustacea
- Class: Insecta
- Order: Orthoptera
- Suborder: Caelifera
- Family: Acrididae
- Subfamily: Incolacridinae
- Genus: Asymmetritania; Storozhenko, 2021

Genus of grasshoppers

External image
- Images at iNaturalist

Asymmetritania is a genus of grasshoppers in the subfamily Incolacridinae (previously the tribe Incolacridini Tinkham, 1940). To date, species have been recorded from Thailand and Vietnam.

Asymmetritania was previously effectively placed in the subfamily Catantopinae, with the type species as "Stolzia vietnamensis". The discovery of this species in Cát Tiên National Park, Đồng Nai Province was considered the first record of the genus Stolzia from the continental part of Asia, but this was reviewed in the setting-up of the Incolacridinae, which is now considered a separate subfamily.

== Species ==
The Orthoptera Species File lists:

1. Asymmetritania asymmetrica (Ingrisch, 1989) - Thailand and Vietnam
2. Asymmetritania vietnamensis Storozhenko, 2020 – type species – locality: Cát Tiên National Park, Vietnam.
