= Stolzia (insect) =

Scientific classification
- Kingdom: Animalia
- Phylum: Arthropoda
- Clade: Pancrustacea
- Class: Insecta
- Order: Orthoptera
- Suborder: Caelifera
- Family: Acrididae
- Subfamily: Incolacridinae
- Genus: Stolzia; Willemse, 1930

Synonyms
- Butonacris Willemse, 1933

Genus of grasshoppers

Stolzia is a genus of grasshoppers in the subfamily Incolacridinae (previously the monotypic tribe Incolacridini Tinkham, 1940; synonyms: Incolacri, Stolziini). Species have been recorded from India and Malesia.

== Description ==
The genus Stolzia differs from genera of Catantopinae by having an asymmetrical epiphallus (male) and in females, the dorsal valves of the ovipositor are apically broadened, rounded and distinctly serrate.

== Species ==
The Orthoptera Species File lists:

1. Stolzia aberrans (Willemse, 1938)
2. Stolzia borneensis (Willemse, 1938)
3. Stolzia fasciata (Willemse, 1933)
4. Stolzia javana Ramme, 1941
5. Stolzia nigromaculata (Willemse, 1938)
6. Stolzia rubromaculata Willemse, 1930 - type species - locality Solok, Sumatra

Note: five species, previously placed here, have been moved to the restored genus Incolacris Willemse, 1932 and S. vietnamensis Storozhenko, 2020 is now placed in the new genus Asymmetritania Storozhenko, 2021.
