= Habrocnemis =

Scientific classification
- Kingdom: Animalia
- Phylum: Arthropoda
- Clade: Pancrustacea
- Class: Insecta
- Order: Orthoptera
- Suborder: Caelifera
- Family: Acrididae
- Subfamily: Habrocneminae
- Genus: Habrocnemis; Uvarov, 1930

Genus of grasshoppers

External image
- Image at iNaturalist

Habrocnemis is a genus of grasshoppers in the subfamily Habrocneminae with species found in South-East Asia.

== Species ==
The Orthoptera Species File lists:

1. Habrocnemis shanensis Uvarov, 1942 - Myanmar (type locality is in southern Shan state), Myanmar, also southern China and Vietnam.
2. Habrocnemis sinensis Uvarov, 1930 - type species - central China
