= Incolacridinae =

Scientific classification
- Kingdom: Animalia
- Phylum: Arthropoda
- Clade: Pancrustacea
- Class: Insecta
- Order: Orthoptera
- Suborder: Caelifera
- Family: Acrididae
- Subfamily: Incolacridinae; Tinkham, 1940

Synonyms
- Incolacridini Tinkham, 1940; Incolacri Tinkham, 1940

Subfamily of grasshoppers

The Incolacridinae are a small subfamily of grasshoppers found mostly in Indochina and Malesia.

== Circumscription ==
The type genus is Incolacris, originally based on the tribe "Incolacri", then elevated to subfamily level by S.Y. Storozhenko in 2021. In this review, Incolacris was revived to its original name (having also been placed in the subfamily Catantopinae) and the genus Asymmetritania was separated from Stolzia (which is now restricted to Malesia, with uncertain records from India).

== Genera ==
The Orthoptera Species File lists:

1. Asymmetritania Storozhenko, 2021
2. Bettotania Willemse, 1933
3. Incolacris Willemse, 1932
4. Stolzia Willemse, 1930
