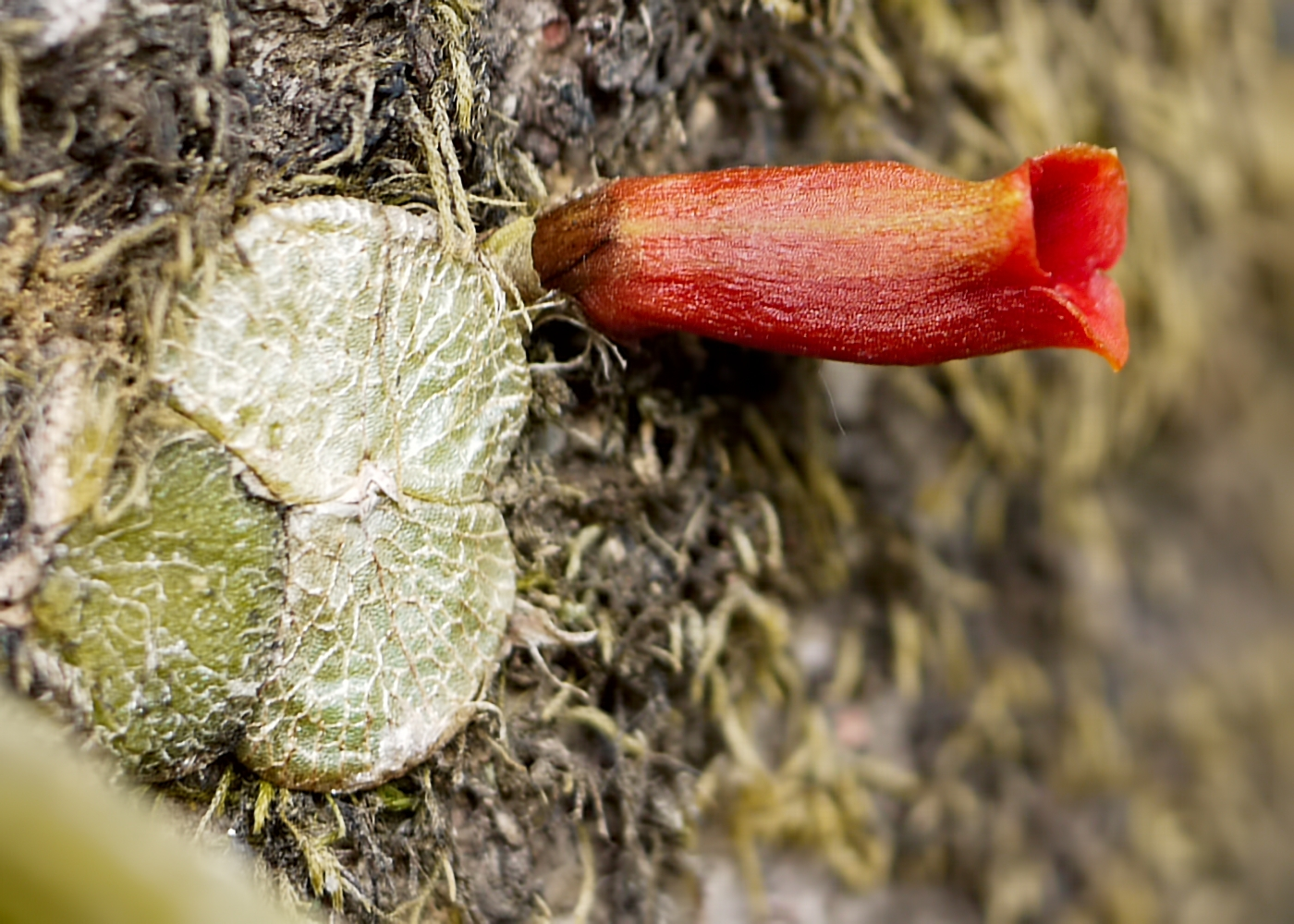

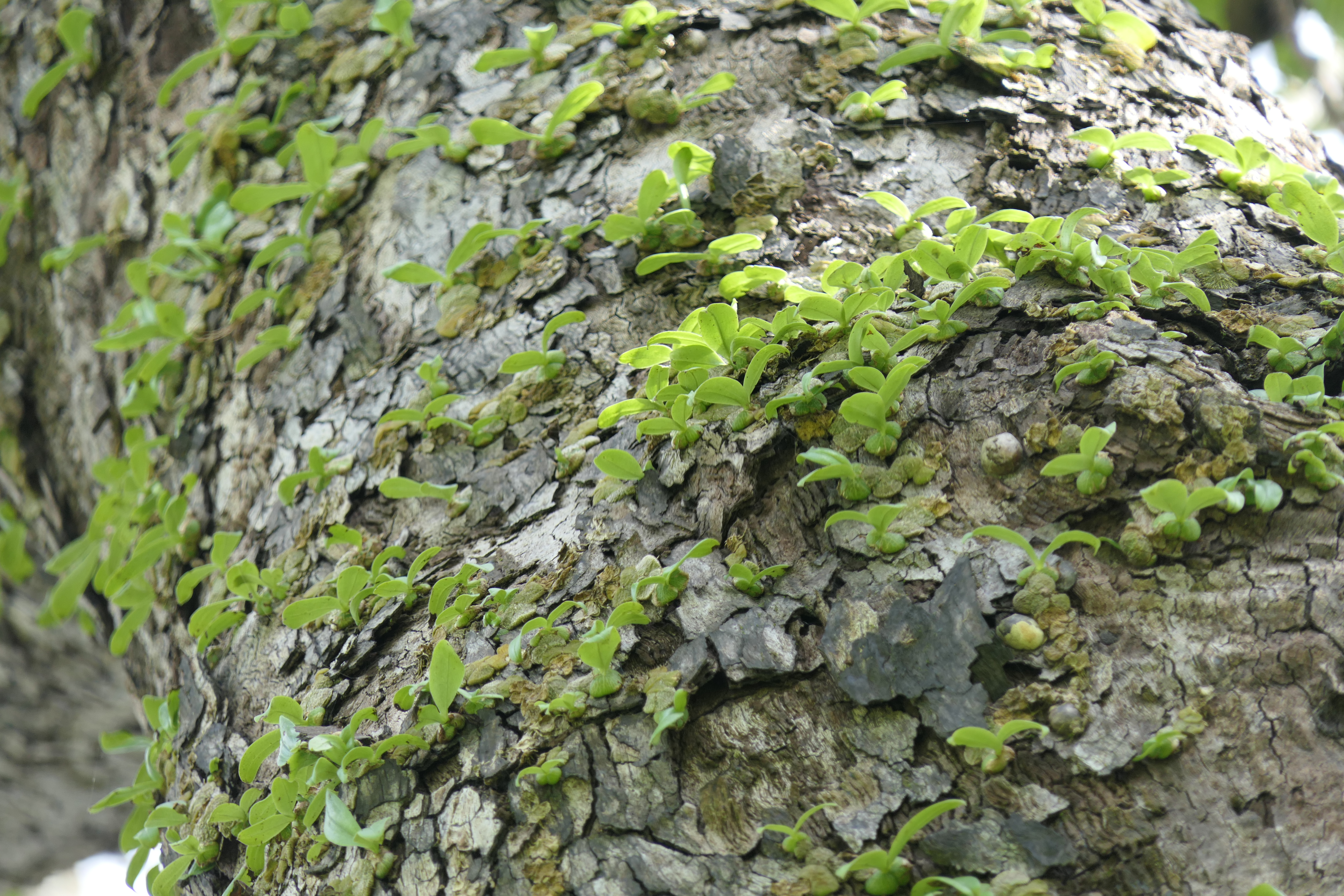

Conservation status
- CITES Appendix II (CITES)

Scientific classification
- Kingdom: Plantae
- Clade: Tracheophytes
- Clade: Angiosperms
- Clade: Monocots
- Order: Asparagales
- Family: Orchidaceae
- Subfamily: Epidendroideae
- Genus: Porpax
- Species: P. reticulata

Binomial name
- Porpax reticulata Lindl.

Synonyms
- Cryptochilus reticulatus (Lindl.) Rchb.f.; Eria reticulata (Lindl.) Benth. & Hook.f.; Aggeianthus marchantioides Wight; Porpax papillosa Blatt. & McCann

= Porpax reticulata =

Species of orchid

Porpax reticulata is a species of orchid in the genus Porpax. It is found in India, Laos, Thailand, and Vietnam.
