= Tristria =

Scientific classification
- Kingdom: Animalia
- Phylum: Arthropoda
- Clade: Pancrustacea
- Class: Insecta
- Order: Orthoptera
- Suborder: Caelifera
- Family: Acrididae
- Subfamily: Spathosterninae
- Tribe: Tristriini
- Genus: Tristria; Stål, 1873

Synonyms
- Metapula Giglio-Tos, 1907; Tapinophyma Uvarov, 1921; Tristia [sic] Hemp, 2009

Genus of grasshoppers

Tristria is a genus of grasshoppers, typical of the tribe Tristriini; species are found in Africa and tropical Asia.

== Species ==
The Orthoptera Species File lists:

1. Tristria angolensis Bolívar, 1890
2. Tristria brachyptera Bolívar, 1912
3. Tristria conica Uvarov, 1953
4. Tristria conops Karsch, 1896
5. Tristria discoidalis Bolívar, 1890
6. Tristria guangxiensis Li, Lu, Jiang & Meng, 1991
7. Tristria marginicosta Karsch, 1896
8. Tristria pallida Karny, 1907
9. Tristria pisciformis Serville, 1838 - type species (as synonym T. lacerta Stål)
10. Tristria pulvinata Uvarov, 1921
