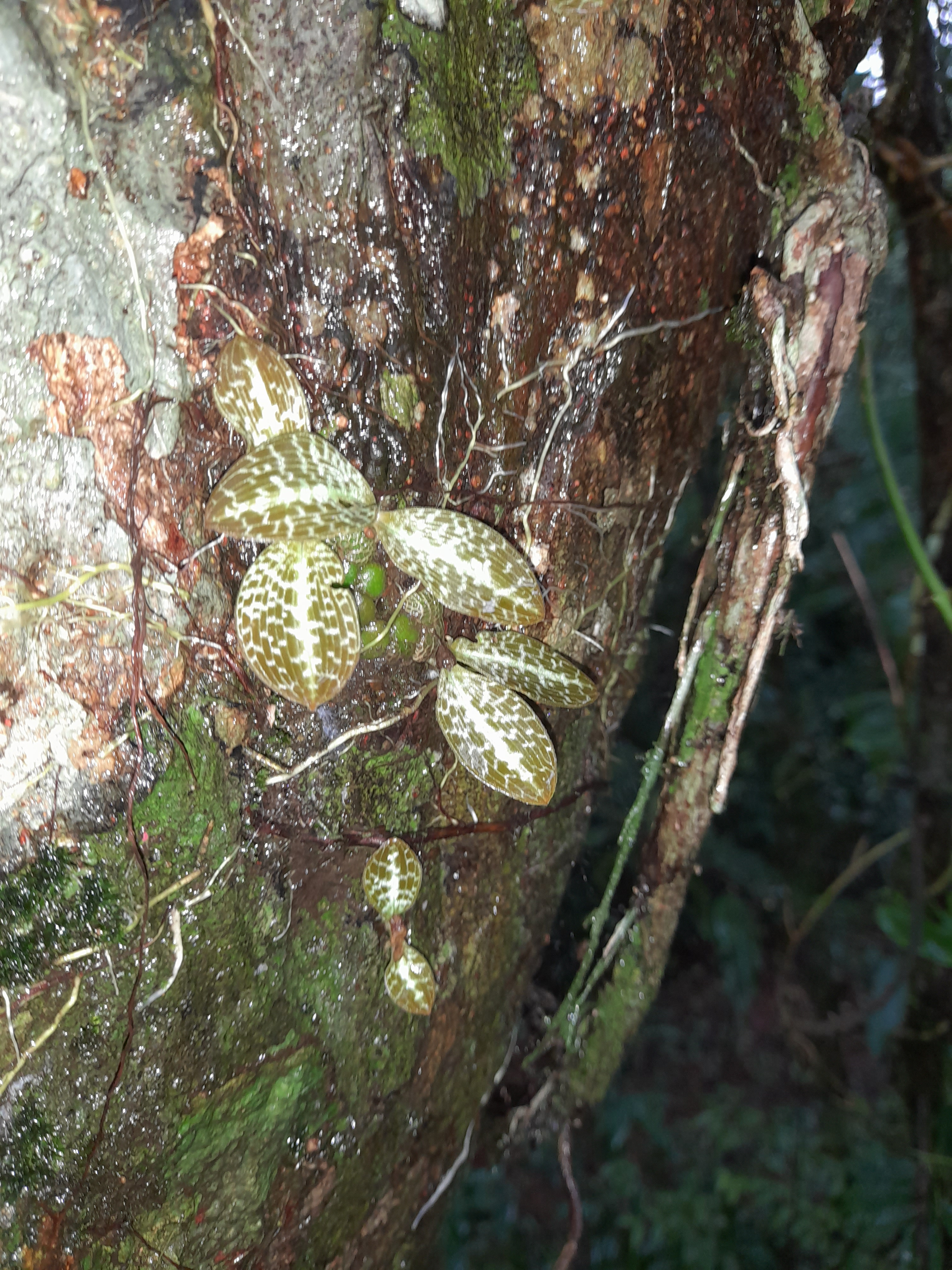

Scientific classification
- Kingdom: Plantae
- Clade: Tracheophytes
- Clade: Angiosperms
- Clade: Monocots
- Order: Asparagales
- Family: Orchidaceae
- Subfamily: Epidendroideae
- Genus: Porpax
- Species: P. jerdoniana

Binomial name
- Porpax jerdoniana (Wight) Rolfe.

= Porpax jerdoniana =

Species of orchid

Porpax jerdoniana is a species of orchid in the genus Porpax.
