= Egnatiinae =

Scientific classification
- Domain: Eukaryota
- Kingdom: Animalia
- Phylum: Arthropoda
- Class: Insecta
- Order: Orthoptera
- Suborder: Caelifera
- Family: Acrididae
- Subfamily: Egnatiinae; Bey-Bienko, 1951

Subfamily of grasshoppers

The Egnatiinae are a subfamily of grasshoppers in the family Acrididae, found in central and South America, and based on the monotypic type genus Egnatius and erected by Bey-Bienko in 1951. Species have been recorded from parts of Africa, the Middle East and Asia, including Russia and China (but distribution may be incomplete).

== Tribe and genera ==
The Orthoptera Species File includes:

tribe Egnatiini Bey-Bienko, 1951

1. Bienkonia Dirsh, 1970
2. Charora Saussure, 1888
3. Egnatiella Bolívar, 1914
4. Egnatioides Vosseler, 1902
5. Egnatius Stål, 1876
6. Ferganacris Sergeev & Bugrov, 1988
7. Paracharora Fishelson, 1993
8. Paregnatius Uvarov, 1933

Unassigned to tribe

1. Leptoscirtus Saussure, 1888
