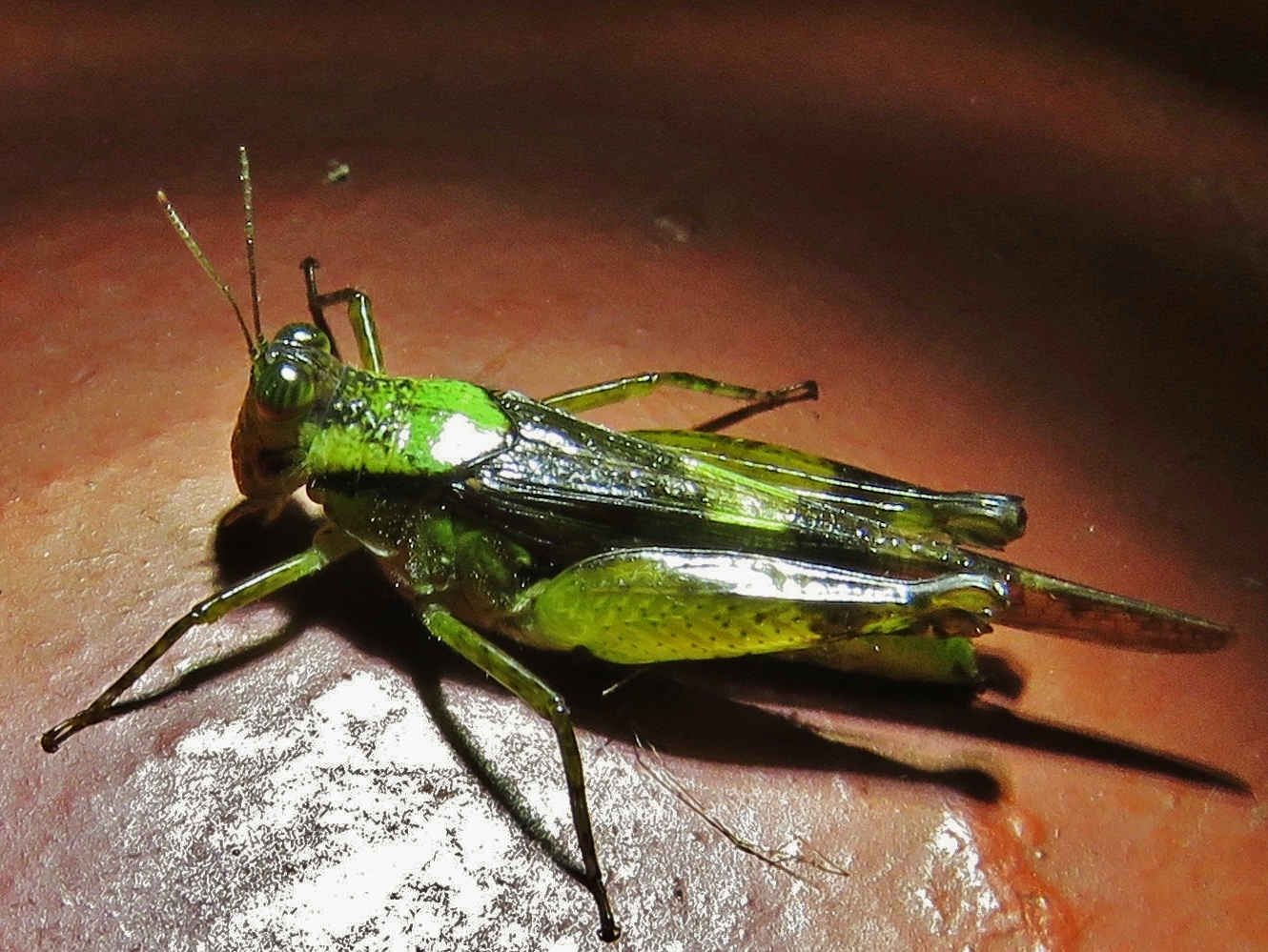
- Paulinia acuminata

Scientific classification
- Domain: Eukaryota
- Kingdom: Animalia
- Phylum: Arthropoda
- Class: Insecta
- Order: Orthoptera
- Suborder: Caelifera
- Family: Acrididae
- Subfamily: Pauliniinae
- Genus: Paulinia; Blanchard, 1843

Synonyms
- Coelopterna Stål, 1873

= Paulinia =

Genus of grasshoppers

Paulinia is a genus of grasshoppers in the monotypic South American subfamily Pauliniinae Hebard, 1923 in the Acrididae, itself a monotypic genus erected by Blanchard in 1843 for the species Paulinia muscosa: now Paulinia acuminata (De Geer, 1773).
