= Porpax verrucosa =

Scientific classification
- Kingdom: Plantae
- Clade: Tracheophytes
- Clade: Angiosperms
- Clade: Monocots
- Order: Asparagales
- Family: Orchidaceae
- Subfamily: Epidendroideae
- Genus: Porpax
- Species: P. verrucosa

Binomial name
- Porpax verrucosa Schuit.

Species of orchid

Porpax verrucosa is a species of epiphytic orchids native to the Cardamom Mountains in Cambodia.
