= Euryphyminae =

Scientific classification
- Domain: Eukaryota
- Kingdom: Animalia
- Phylum: Arthropoda
- Class: Insecta
- Order: Orthoptera
- Suborder: Caelifera
- Family: Acrididae
- Subfamily: Euryphyminae; Dirsh, 1956

Synonyms
- Euryphymi Dirsh, 1956

Subfamily of grasshoppers

The Euryphyminae are a subfamily of grasshoppers in the family Acrididae, based on the type genus Euryphymus and may be called "agile grasshoppers"; it was erected by Vitaly Michailovitsh Dirsh in 1956. Species have been recorded from parts of sub-Saharan Africa including Madagascar (but the distribution may be incomplete).

== Genera ==
A key to genera is given by Hemp & Rowell. The Orthoptera Species File includes:

1. Acoryphella Giglio-Tos, 1907
2. Acrophymus Uvarov, 1922
3. Amblyphymus Uvarov, 1922
4. Anabibia Dirsh, 1956
5. Aneuryphymus Uvarov, 1922
6. Brachyphymus Uvarov, 1922
7. Calliptamicus Uvarov, 1922
8. Calliptamuloides Dirsh, 1956
9. Calliptamulus Uvarov, 1922
10. Catantopoides Johnsen, 1990
11. Euryphymus Stål, 1873
12. Kevanacris Dirsh, 1961
13. Pachyphymus Uvarov, 1922
14. Phymeurus Giglio-Tos, 1907
15. Platacanthoides Kirby, 1910
16. Plegmapteroides Dirsh, 1959
17. Plegmapteropsis Dirsh, 1956
18. Plegmapterus Martínez y Fernández-Castillo, 1898
19. Rhachitopis Uvarov, 1922
20. Rhachitopoides Naskrecki, 1995
21. Rhodesiana (grasshopper) Dirsh, 1959
22. Somaliacris Dirsh, 1959
23. Surudia Uvarov, 1930
