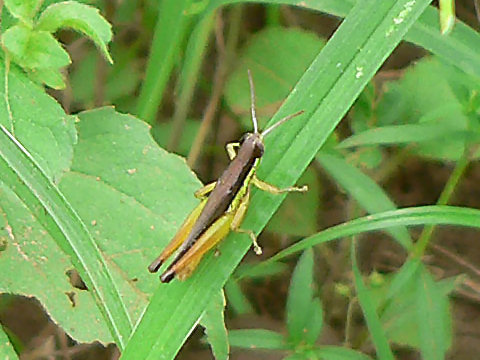
- Spathosternum pygmaeum

Scientific classification
- Kingdom: Animalia
- Phylum: Arthropoda
- Clade: Pancrustacea
- Class: Insecta
- Order: Orthoptera
- Suborder: Caelifera
- Superfamily: Acridoidea
- Family: Acrididae
- Subfamily: Spathosterninae; Rehn, 1957

= Spathosterninae =

Subfamily of grasshoppers

Spathosterninae is a subfamily of grasshoppers, based on the genus Spathosternum. It consists of tribe Spathosternini (currently with 3 genera) and the Tristiini (previously placed in the Tropidopolinae); species are recorded from Africa, Asia and Australia.

== Genera ==
The Orthoptera Species File includes two tribes:

Spathosternini Rehn, 1957

1. Laxabilla Sjöstedt, 1934 - Australia
2. Paraspathosternum Ramme, 1929 - E. Africa, Madagascar
3. Spathosternum Krauss, 1877 - Africa, India, China, Indochina

=== Tristriini ===
Auth. Mistshenko, 1945

1. Beybienkoacris Storozhenko, 2005 - Thailand
2. Siamacris Willemse, 1955 - Thailand
3. Tenasserimacris Dawwrueng, Storozhenko & Vitheepradit, 2025 - Thailand
4. Tristria Stål, 1873 – equatorial Africa and Asia (including Indochina and Sulawesi)
5. Tristriella Descamps & Wintrebert, 1967 - Madagascar
