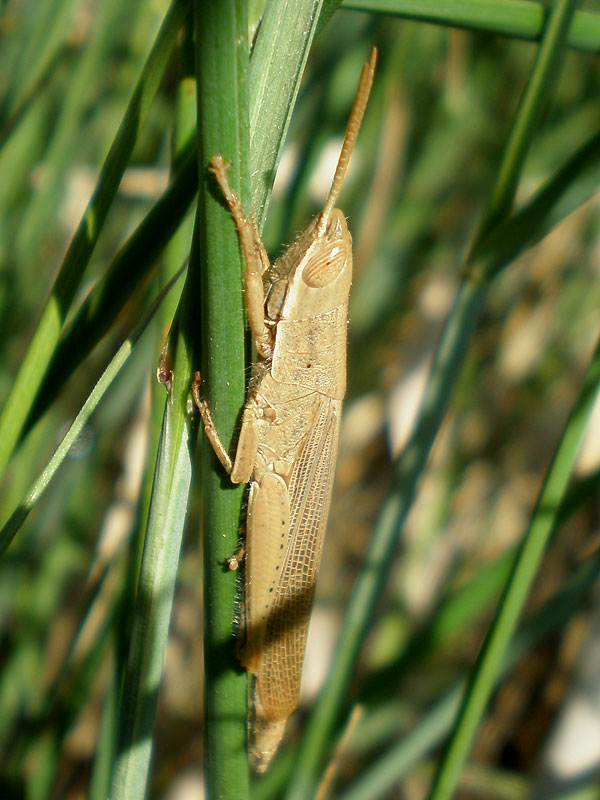
- Tropidopola cylindrica
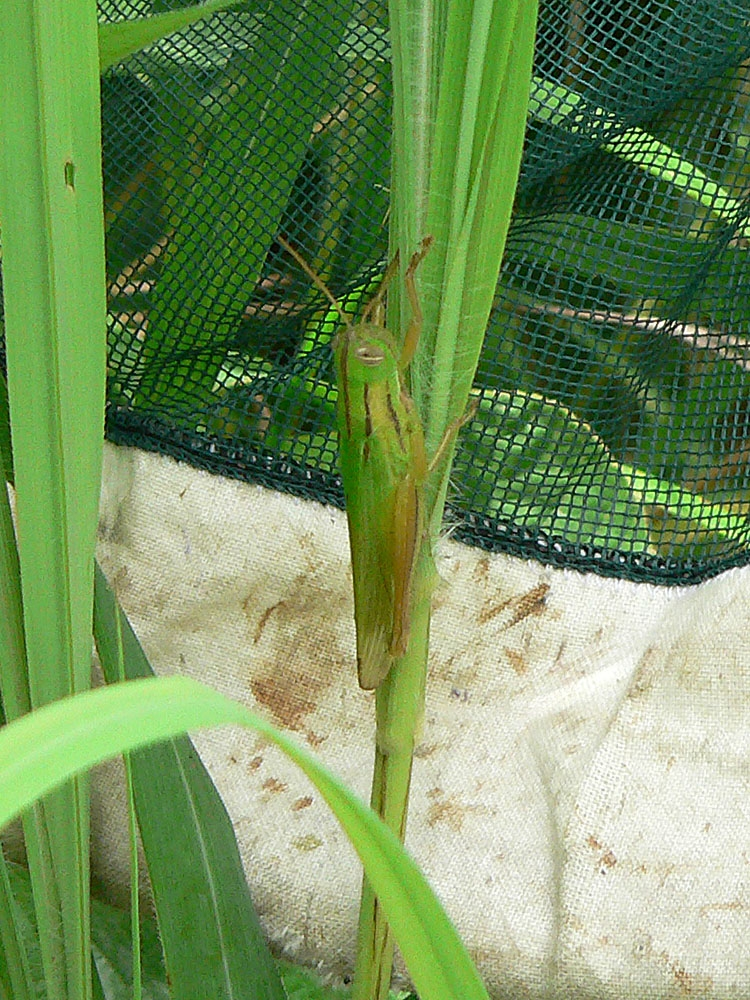
- Chloroxyrrhepes virescens

Scientific classification
- Kingdom: Animalia
- Phylum: Arthropoda
- Clade: Pancrustacea
- Class: Insecta
- Order: Orthoptera
- Suborder: Caelifera
- Infraorder: Acrididea
- Nanorder: Acridomorpha
- Superfamily: Acridoidea
- Family: Acrididae
- Subfamily: Tropidopolinae; Jacobson in Jacobson & Bianchi, 1905

= Tropidopolinae =

Subfamily of grasshoppers

The Tropidopolinae are a subfamily of Acrididae in the Orthoptera: Caelifera. Species can be found in Africa, southern Europe and Asia.

== Tribes and genera ==
The Orthoptera Species File includes the following:

=== Tropidopolini ===
Authority: Jacobson 1905

1. Tropidopola Stål, 1873 – type genus: central & northern Africa, southern Europe; Asia: near East, India up to Siberia

=== tribe unassigned ===
1. Afroxyrrhepes Uvarov, 1943 – equatorial Africa
2. Chloroxyrrhepes Uvarov, 1943 – west Africa
3. Dabba (grasshopper) Uvarov, 1933 - Iran
4. Homoxyrrhepes Uvarov, 1926 - Africa
5. Limnippa Uvarov, 1941 - monotypic: E. Africa
6. Mesopsilla Ramme, 1929 - monotypic: Congo
7. Musimoja Uvarov, 1953 - monotypic: Angola
8. Neooxyrrhepes Khan & Usmani, 2019 - monotypic: Assam
9. Petamella Giglio-Tos, 1907 - Africa
10. Pseudotristria Dirsh, 1961 – southern Africa
