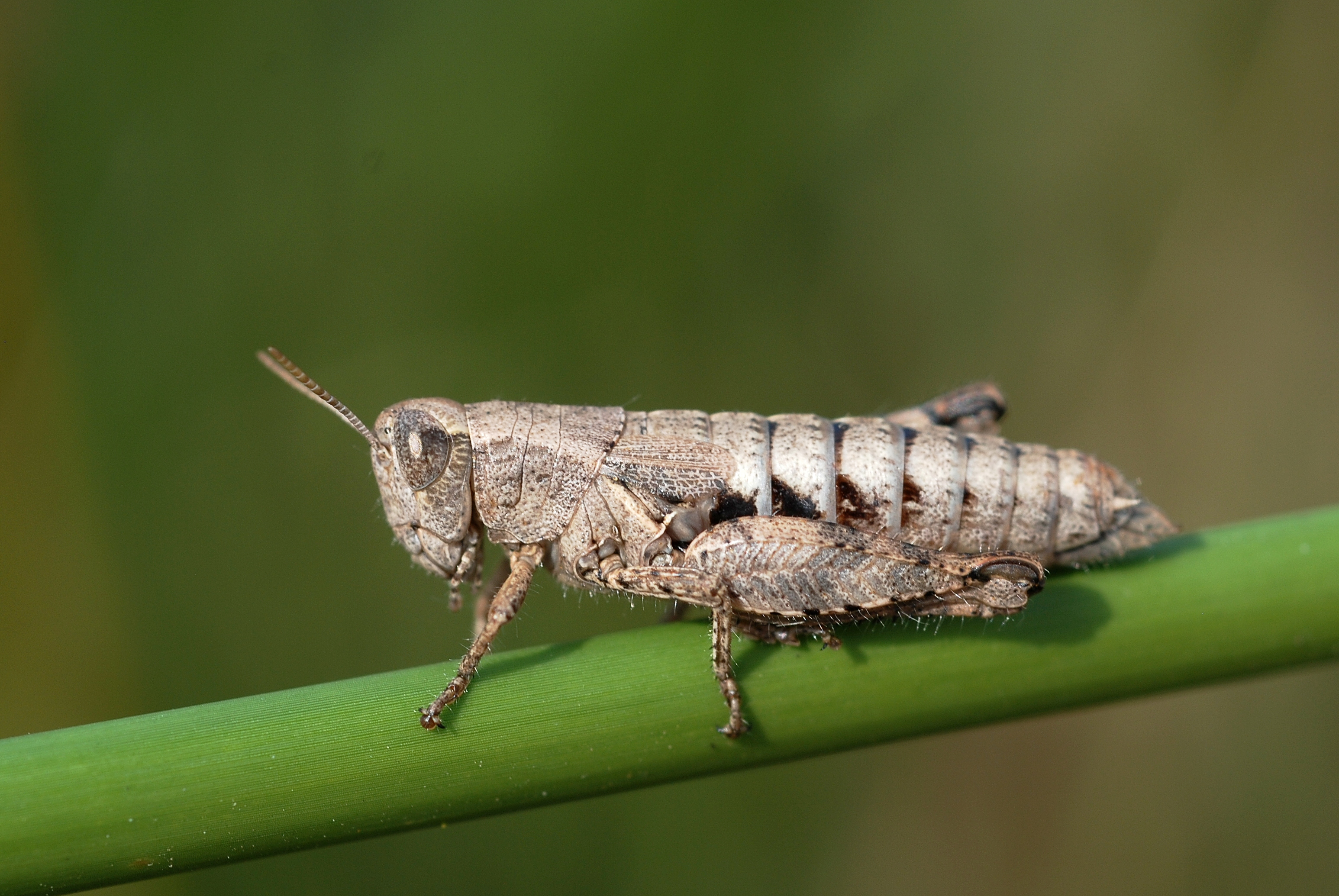
- Pezotettix giornae, France

Scientific classification
- Kingdom: Animalia
- Phylum: Arthropoda
- Class: Insecta
- Order: Orthoptera
- Suborder: Caelifera
- Superfamily: Acridoidea
- Family: Acrididae
- Subfamily: Pezotettiginae; Brunner von Wattenwyl, 1893

Synonyms
- Pegotettix Dodge, 1876; Pelecycleis Fieber, 1853; Pelecyclus Fieber, 1853; Pezotettis Targioni-Tozzetti, 1881; Platyphyma Fischer, 1853

= Pezotettiginae =

Subfamily of grasshoppers

Pezotettiginae is a subfamily of grasshoppers in the family Acrididae, found in southern Europe, northern Africa, and the Mediterranean region. There are about 10 described species in Pezotettiginae.

== Genera ==
These genera belong to the subfamily Pezotettiginae:

1. Pezotettix Burmeister, 1840
2. Sphenophyma Uvarov, 1934 - monotypic S. rugulosa (Stål, 1876)
