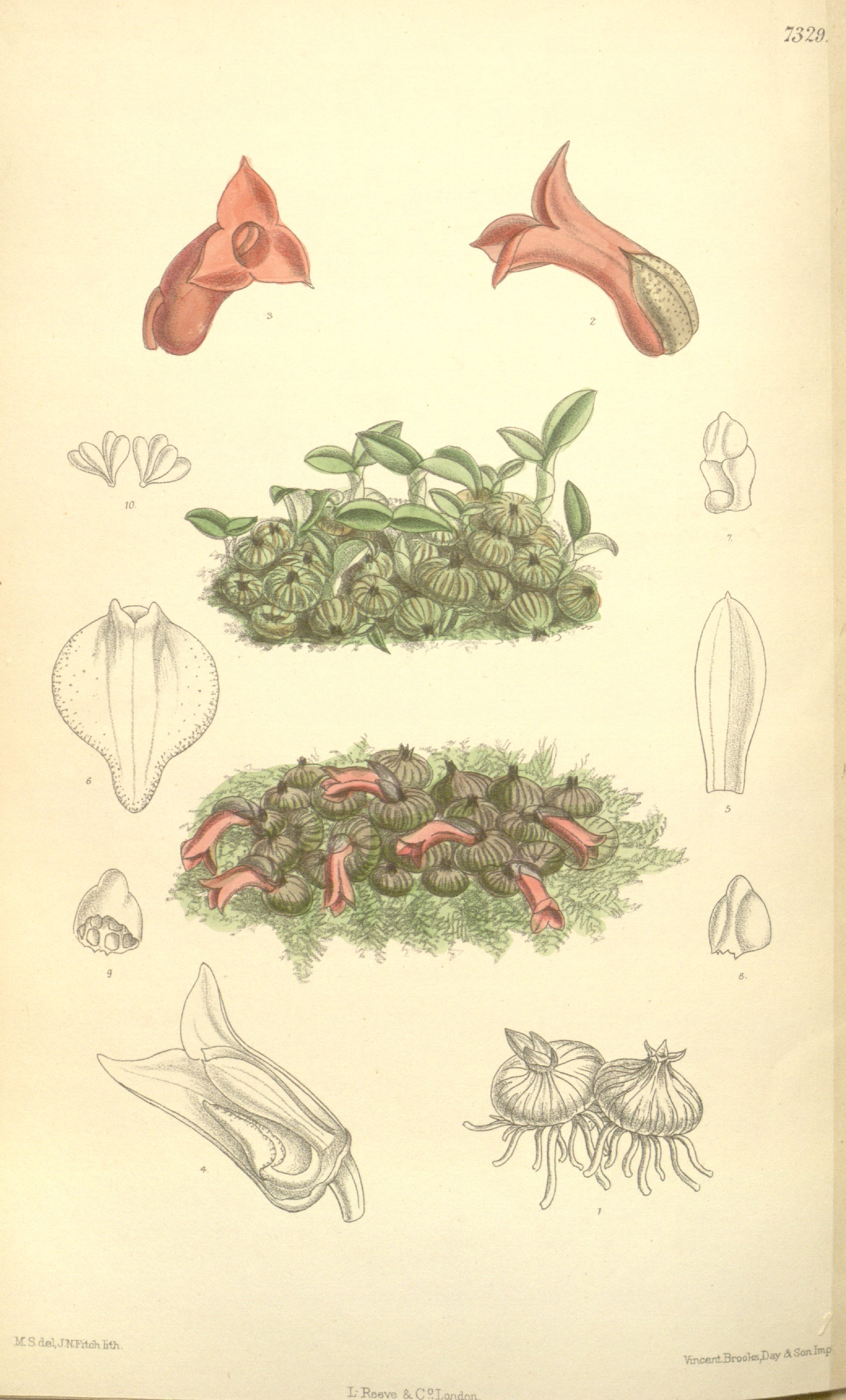
- Porpax meirax

Scientific classification
- Kingdom: Plantae
- Clade: Embryophytes
- Clade: Tracheophytes
- Clade: Spermatophytes
- Clade: Angiosperms
- Clade: Monocots
- Order: Asparagales
- Family: Orchidaceae
- Subfamily: Epidendroideae
- Tribe: Podochileae
- Subtribe: Eriinae
- Genus: Porpax; Lindl. 1845, not Salisb. 1866

Synonyms
- Aggeianthus Wight; Alvisia Lindl.; Conchidium Griff.; Lichenora Wight; Stolzia Schltr.

= Porpax (plant) =

Genus of orchids

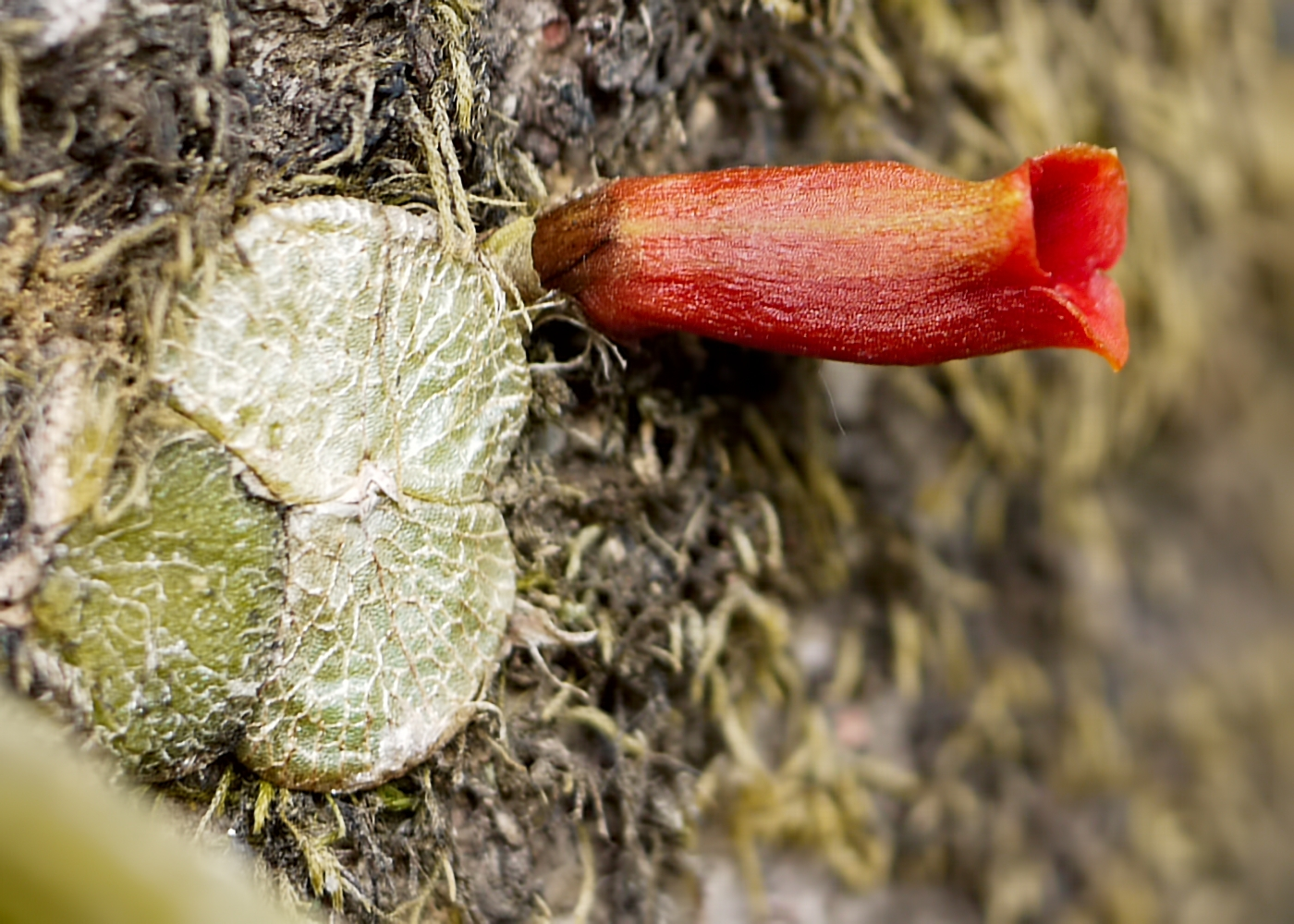
Porpax reticulata

Porpax is a genus of epiphytic orchids native to southern and southeastern Asia from India to Yunnan to Borneo. As of March 2021, Plants of the World Online accepts the following species:

- Porpax albiflora (Rolfe) Schuit., Y.P.Ng & H.A.Pedersen
- Porpax angustifolia (Mansf.) Schuit., Y.P.Ng & H.A.Pedersen
- Porpax articulata (Lindl.) Schuit., Y.P.Ng & H.A.Pedersen
- Porpax atrorubra (Mansf.) Schuit., Y.P.Ng & H.A.Pedersen
- Porpax borneensis J.J.Wood & A.L.Lamb
- Porpax braccata (Lindl.) Schuit., Y.P.Ng & H.A.Pedersen
- Porpax bulbophylloides (C.Schweinf.) Schuit., Y.P.Ng & H.A.Pedersen
- Porpax capuccinorum Aver.
- Porpax christopheri (P.J.Cribb) Schuit., Y.P.Ng & H.A.Pedersen
- Porpax compacta (P.J.Cribb) Schuit., Y.P.Ng & H.A.Pedersen
- Porpax conica (Summerh.) Schuit., Y.P.Ng & H.A.Pedersen
- Porpax cupuligera (Kraenzl.) Schuit., Y.P.Ng & H.A.Pedersen
- Porpax dickasonii (Ormerod) Schuit., Y.P.Ng & H.A.Pedersen
- Porpax elaidium (Lindl.) Schuit., Y.P.Ng & H.A.Pedersen
- Porpax elwesii (Rchb.f.) Rolfe
- Porpax exilis (Hook.f.) Schuit., Y.P.Ng & H.A.Pedersen
- Porpax extinctoria (Lindl.) Schuit., Y.P.Ng & H.A.Pedersen
- Porpax fibuliformis (King & Pantl.) King & Pantl.
- Porpax filiformis (Wight) Schuit., Y.P.Ng & H.A.Pedersen
- Porpax gigantea Deori
- Porpax grandiflora Seidenf.
- Porpax heiligenthalii (Eb.Fisch., Killmann, J.-P.Lebel & Delep.) Schuit., Y.P.Ng & H.A.Pedersen
- Porpax jerdoniana (Wight) Rolfe
- Porpax kalkhof-roseae (Eb.Fisch., Killmann, J.-P.Lebel & Delep.) Schuit., Y.P.Ng & H.A.Pedersen
- Porpax karikouyensis (Schltr.) Schuit., Y.P.Ng & H.A.Pedersen
- Porpax lacei (Summerh.) Schuit., Y.P.Ng & H.A.Pedersen
- Porpax lanii Seidenf.
- Porpax laosensis Aver.
- Porpax lasiorhiza (Schltr.) Schuit., Y.P.Ng & H.A.Pedersen
- Porpax leedalii (P.J.Cribb) Schuit., Y.P.Ng & H.A.Pedersen
- Porpax macrantha Schuit., Y.P.Ng & H.A.Pedersen
- Porpax meirax (C.S.P.Parish & Rchb.f.) King & Pantl.
- Porpax microchilos (Dalzell) Schuit., Y.P.Ng & H.A.Pedersen
- Porpax moniliformis (P.J.Cribb) Schuit., Y.P.Ng & H.A.Pedersen
- Porpax muscicola (Lindl.) Schuit., Y.P.Ng & H.A.Pedersen
- Porpax nana (A.Rich.) Schuit., Y.P.Ng & H.A.Pedersen
- Porpax nyassana (Schltr.) Schuit., Y.P.Ng & H.A.Pedersen
- Porpax oligantha (Mansf.) Schuit., Y.P.Ng & H.A.Pedersen
- Porpax parishii (Lindl. & Rchb.f.) Rolfe
- Porpax peperomioides (Kraenzl.) Schuit., Y.P.Ng & H.A.Pedersen
- Porpax pusilla (Griff.) Schuit., Y.P.Ng & H.A.Pedersen
- Porpax repens (Rolfe) Schuit., Y.P.Ng & H.A.Pedersen
- Porpax reticulata Lindl.
- Porpax scaposa Seidenf.
- Porpax seidenfadenii A.N.Rao
- Porpax sikkimensis (Bajrach. & K.K.Shrestha) Schuit., Y.P.Ng & H.A.Pedersen
- Porpax spirodela (Aver.) Schuit., Y.P.Ng & H.A.Pedersen
- Porpax summerhayesiana (A.D.Hawkes & A.H.Heller) Schuit., Y.P.Ng & H.A.Pedersen
- Porpax thaithongiae Suddee, Promm. & Watthana
- Porpax ustulata (C.S.P.Parish & Rchb.f.) Rolfe
- Porpax verrucosa Schuit.
- Porpax viridis (P.J.Cribb) Schuit., Y.P.Ng & H.A.Pedersen
- Porpax williamsonii (P.J.Cribb) Schuit., Y.P.Ng & H.A.Pedersen
