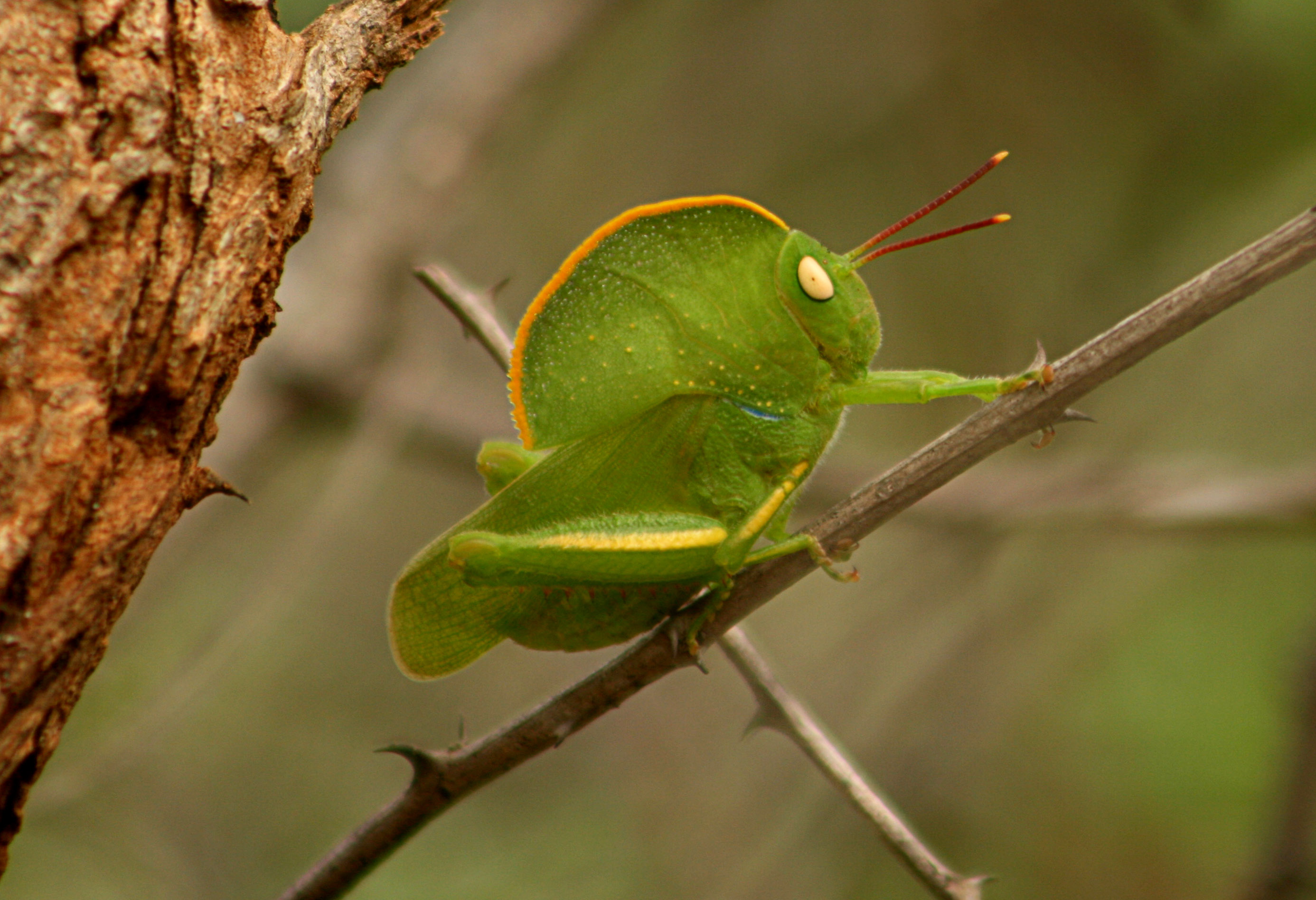
- Teratodes monticollis, hooded grasshopper

Scientific classification
- Kingdom: Animalia
- Phylum: Arthropoda
- Class: Insecta
- Order: Orthoptera
- Suborder: Caelifera
- Superfamily: Acridoidea
- Family: Acrididae
- Subfamily: Teratodinae; Brunner von Wattenwyl, 1893

Synonyms
- Acrostegastes Johnston, 1956; Teratodes Brunner von Wattenwyl, 1893; Teratodini Brunner von Wattenwyl, 1893

= Teratodinae =

Subfamily of grasshoppers

Teratodinae is a subfamily of grasshoppers in the family Acrididae, erected by Carl Brunner von Wattenwyl in 1893. There are more than 20 described species, found in East Africa and South-West Asia.

== Genera ==
The following genera belong to the subfamily Teratodinae:

1. Acrostegastes Karsch, 1896
2. Esfandiaria - monotypic E. obesa Popov, 1951
3. Eurynotacris Ramme, 1931
4. Kabulia Ramme, 1928
5. Lyrotyloides - monotypic L. viridis Bey-Bienko, 1956
6. Lyrotylus Uvarov, 1923
7. Robecchia Schulthess, 1898
8. Teratodes Brullé, 1835
