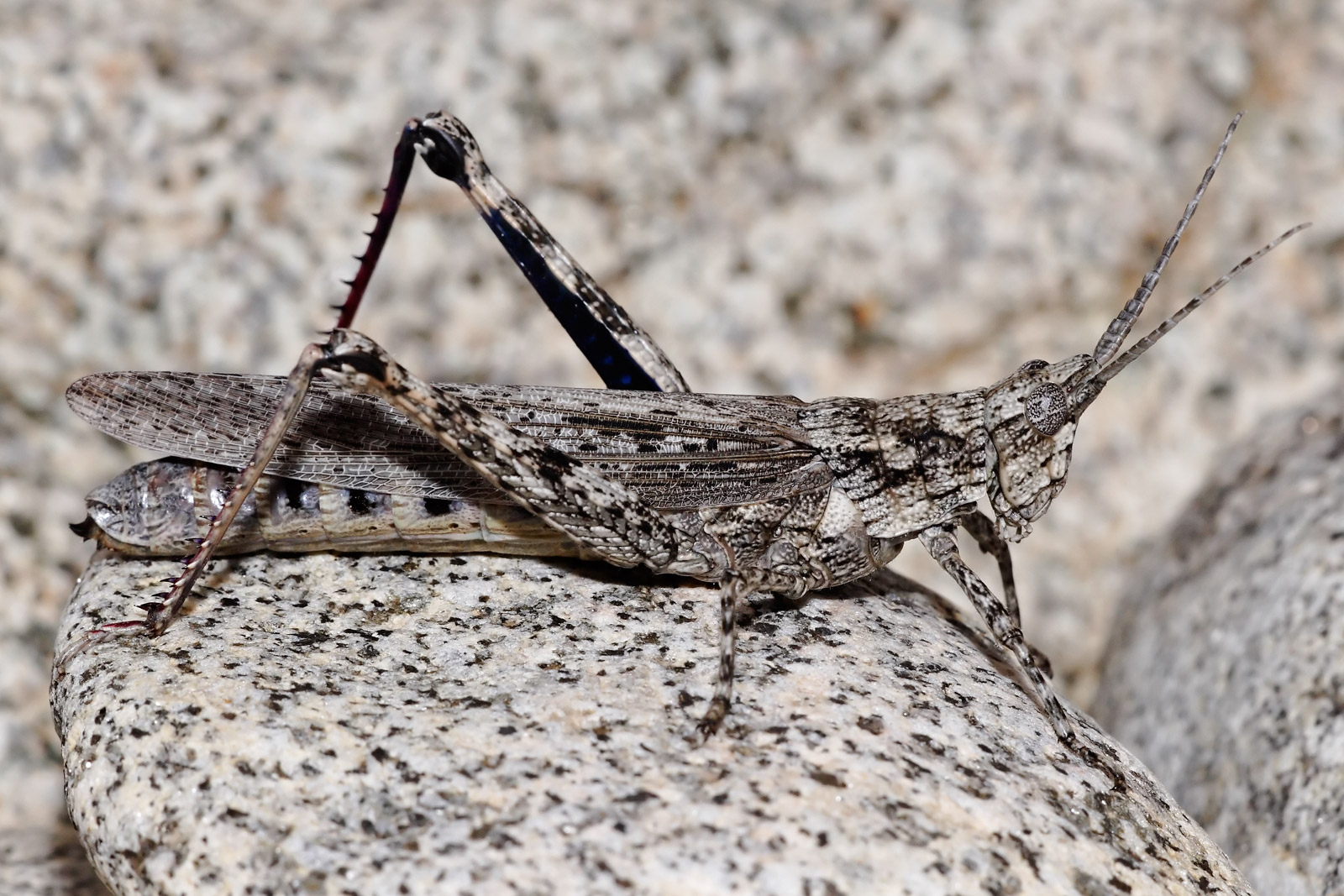
- Bark mimicking grasshopper, Coryphistes ruricola (Catantopinae)

Scientific classification
- Kingdom: Animalia
- Phylum: Arthropoda
- Class: Insecta
- Order: Orthoptera
- Suborder: Caelifera
- Superfamily: Acridoidea
- Family: Acrididae; MacLeay, 1819

Subfamilies
- See text

Synonyms
- Acridiidae MacLeay 1821

= Acrididae =

Acrididae Temporal range: Paleocene to recent 59–0 Ma

Family of grasshoppers in the suborder Caelifera

Acrididae are the predominant family of grasshoppers, comprising some 10,000 of the 11,000 species of the entire suborder Caelifera. The Acrididae are best known because all locusts (swarming grasshoppers) are of the Acrididae. The subfamily Oedipodinae is sometimes classified as a distinct family Oedipodidae in the superfamily Acridoidea. Acrididae grasshoppers are characterized by relatively short and stout antennae (so they may be called "short-horned grasshoppers"), and tympana on the side of the first abdominal segment.

== Subfamilies ==
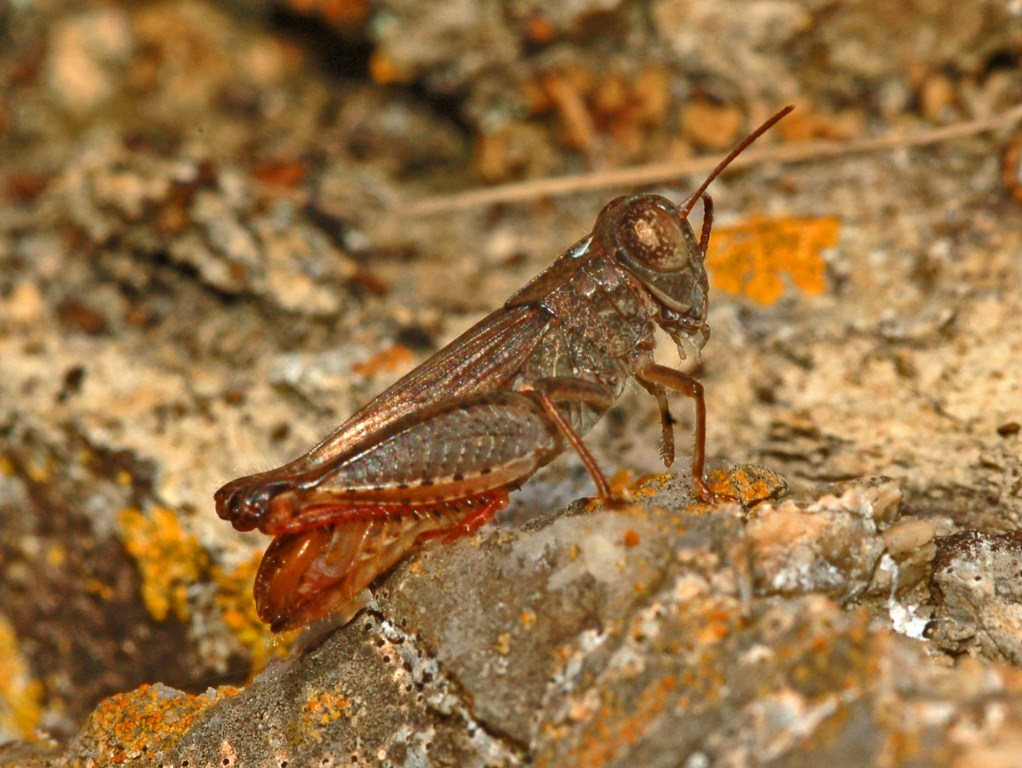
Calliptamus italicus (Calliptaminae)

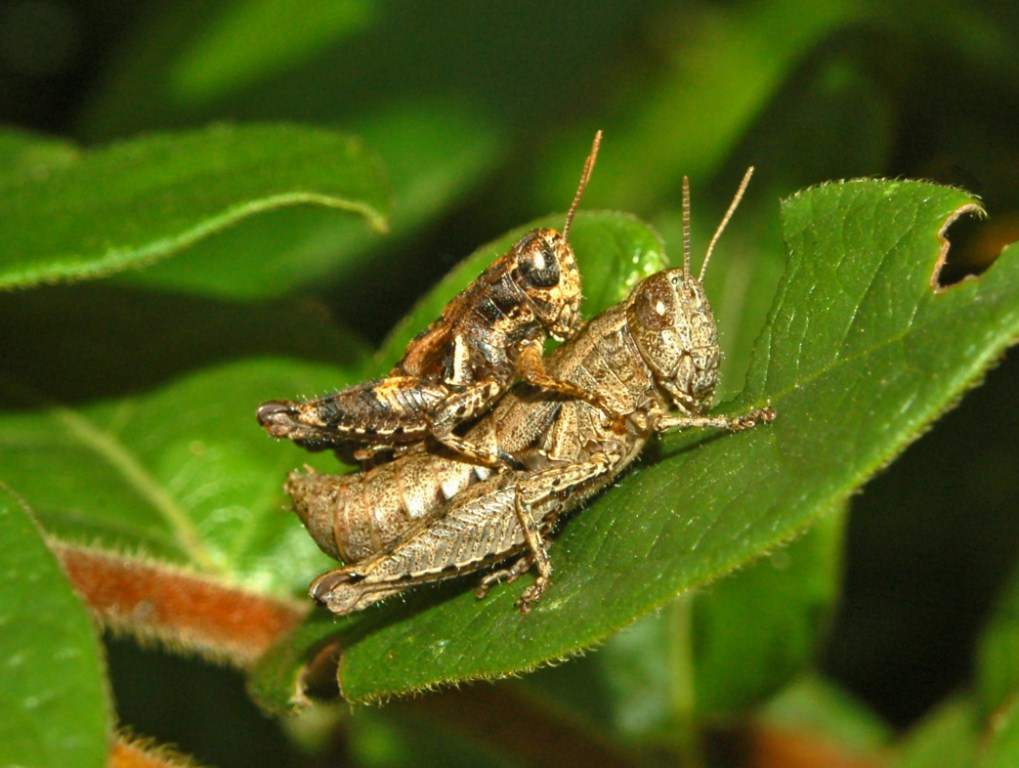
Pezotettix giornae (Pezotettiginae)

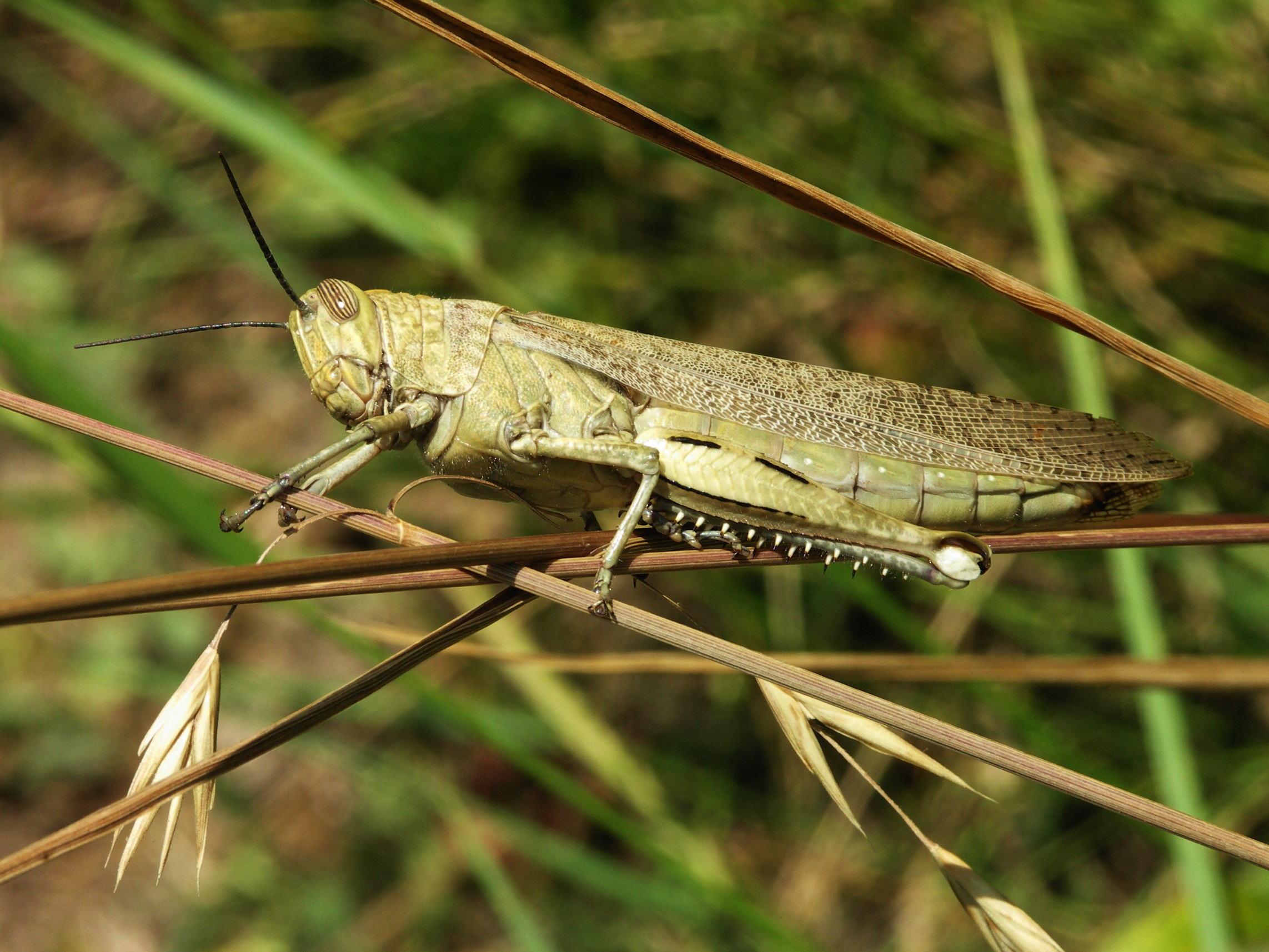
Egyptian grasshopper Anacridium aegyptium (Cyrtacanthacridinae)

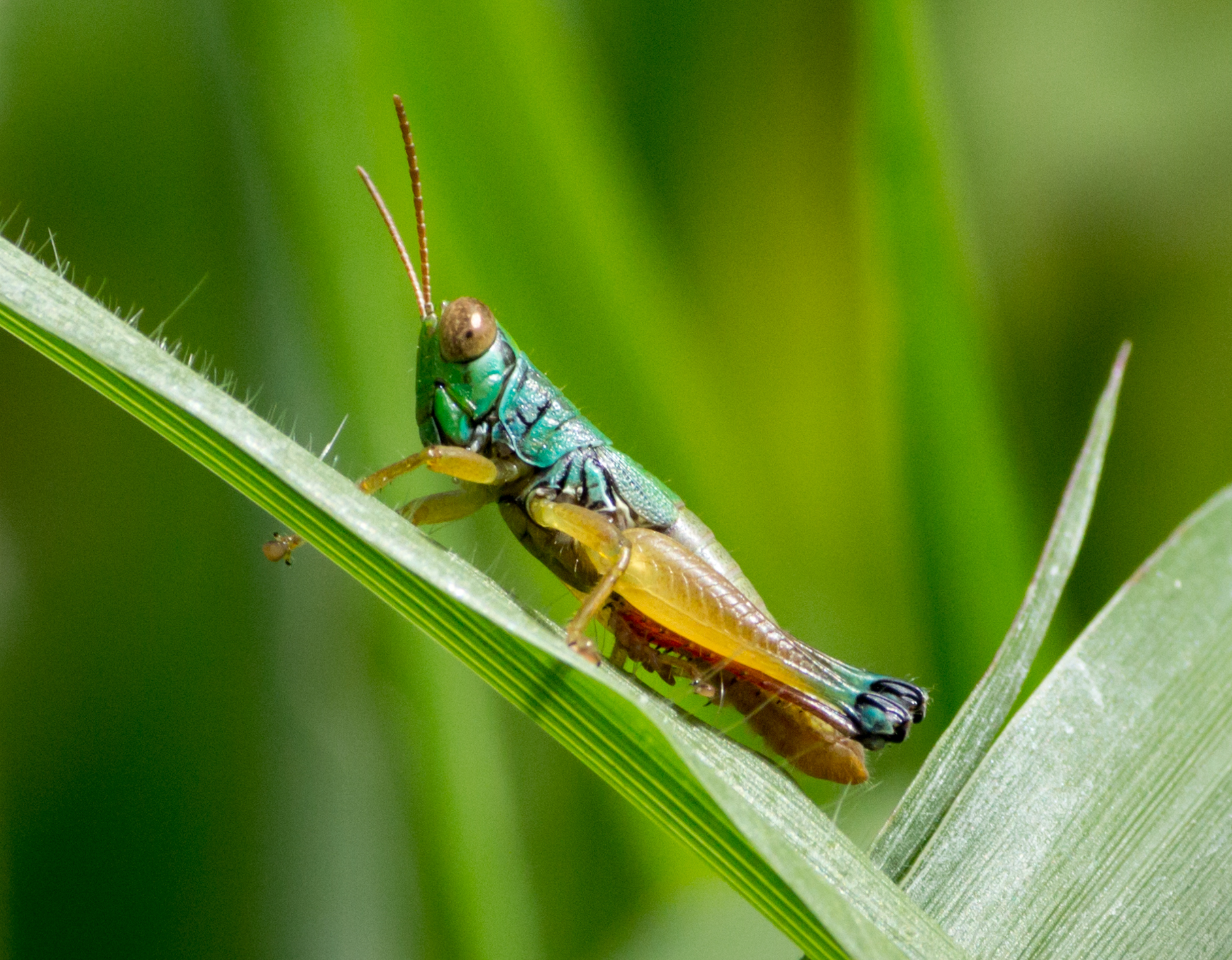
Caryanda spuria (Caryandinae)

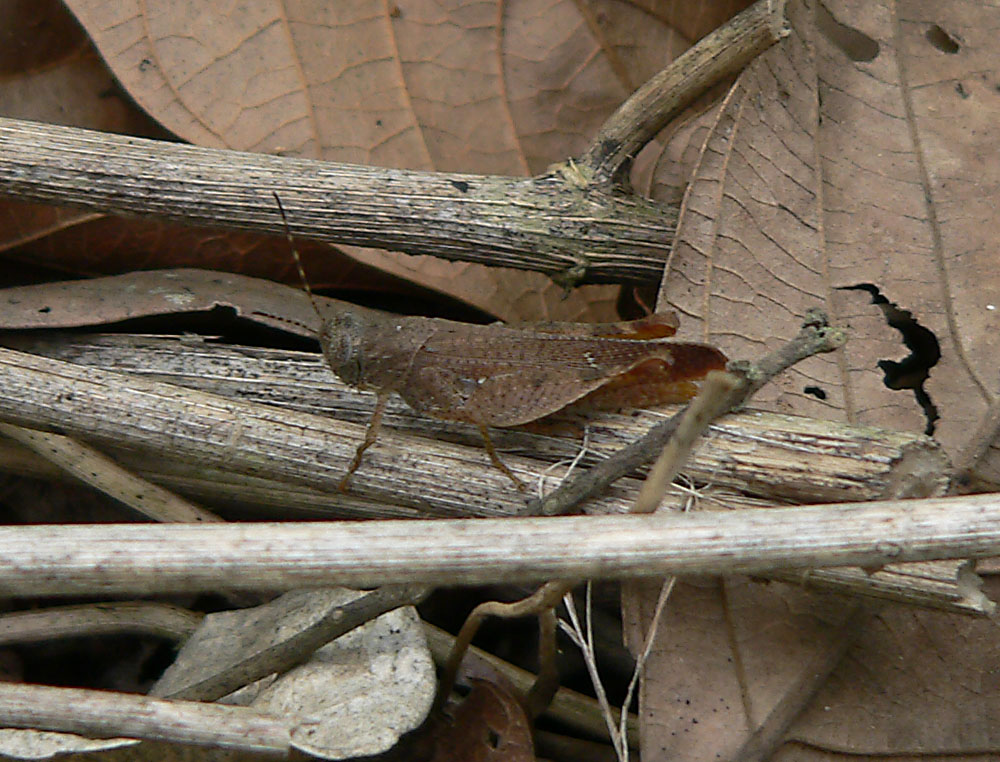
Eucoptacra anguliflava female (Coptacrinae)

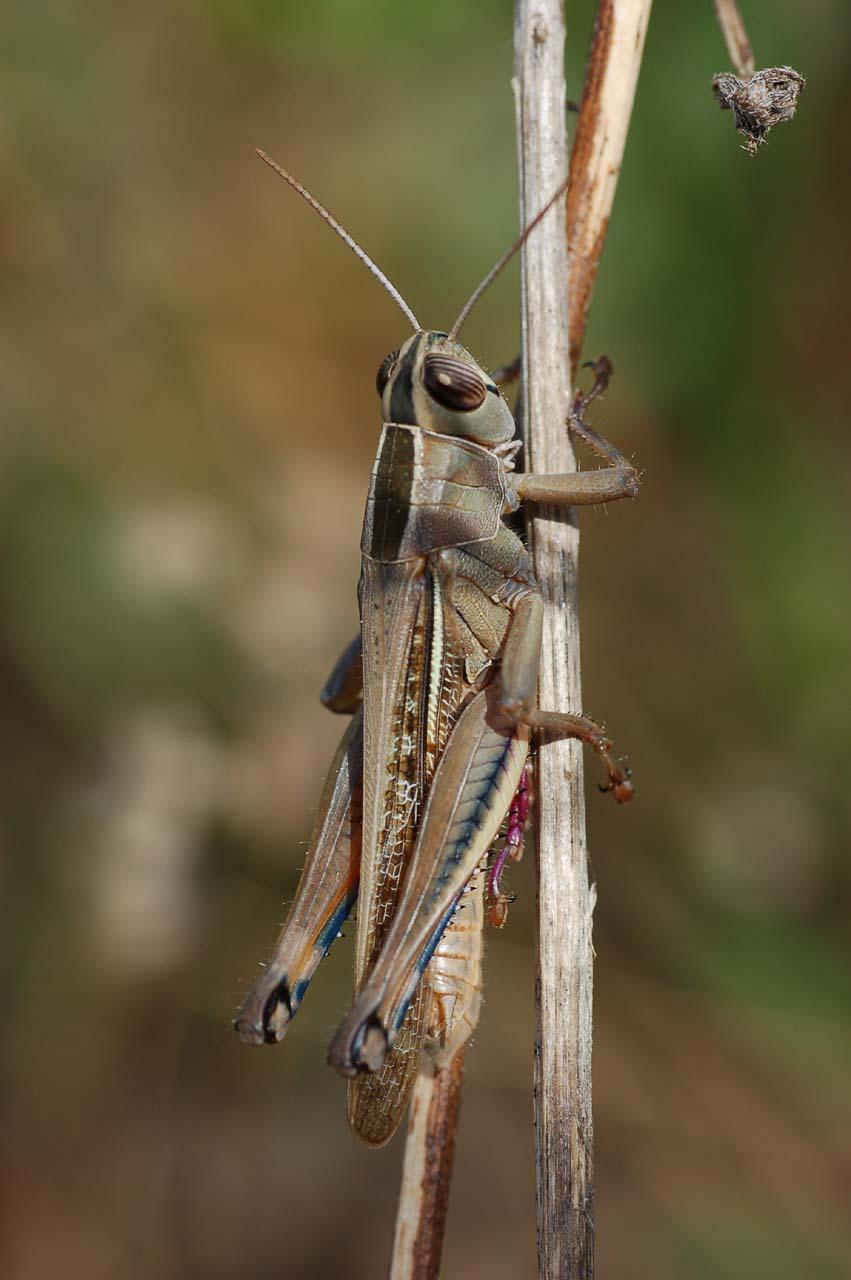
Eyprepocnemis plorans plorans

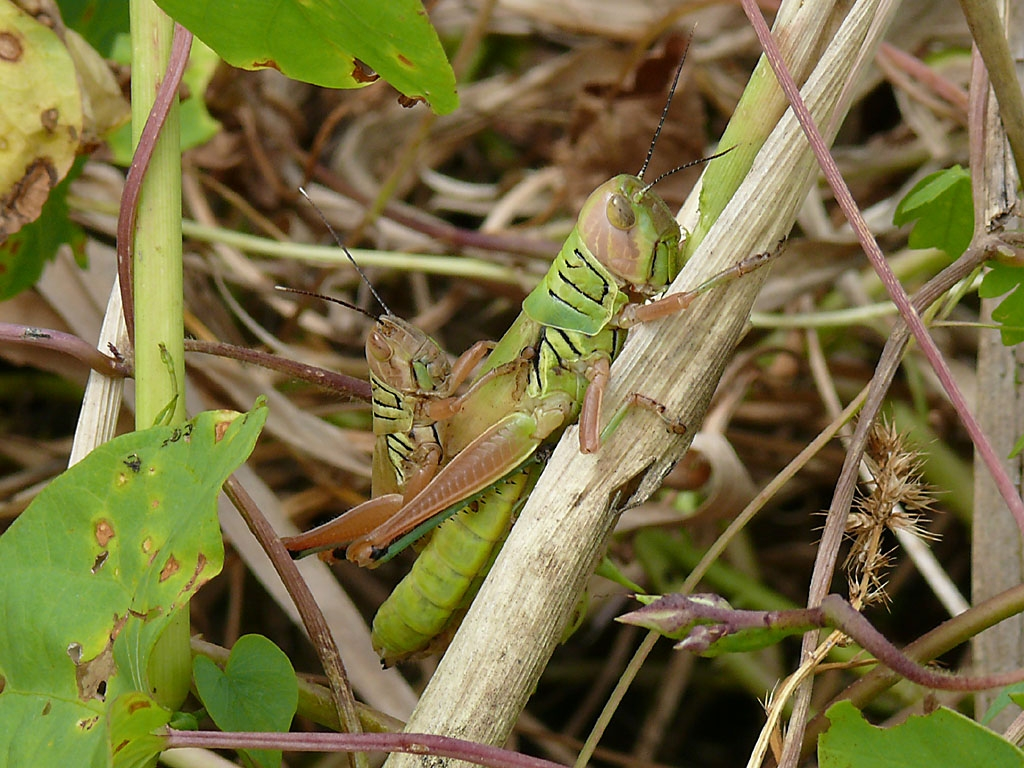
Hieroglyphus daganensis

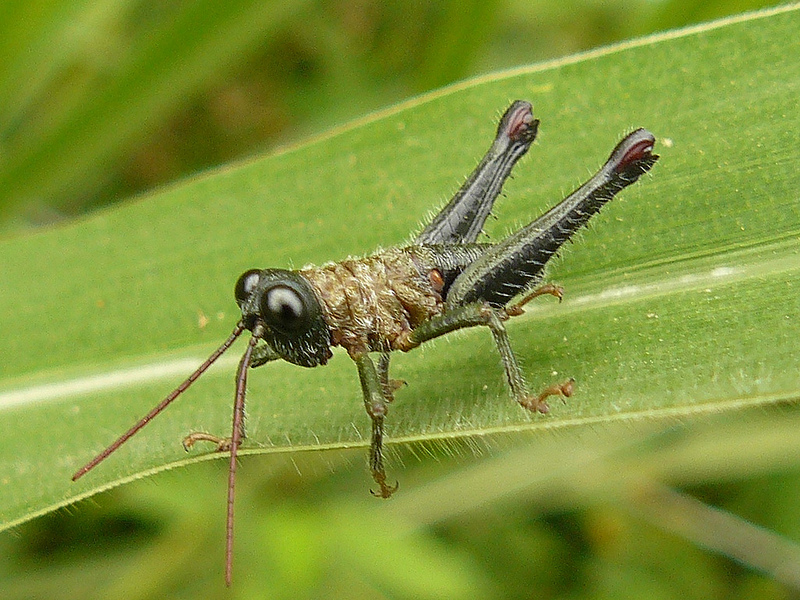
Rhytidochrota risaraldae

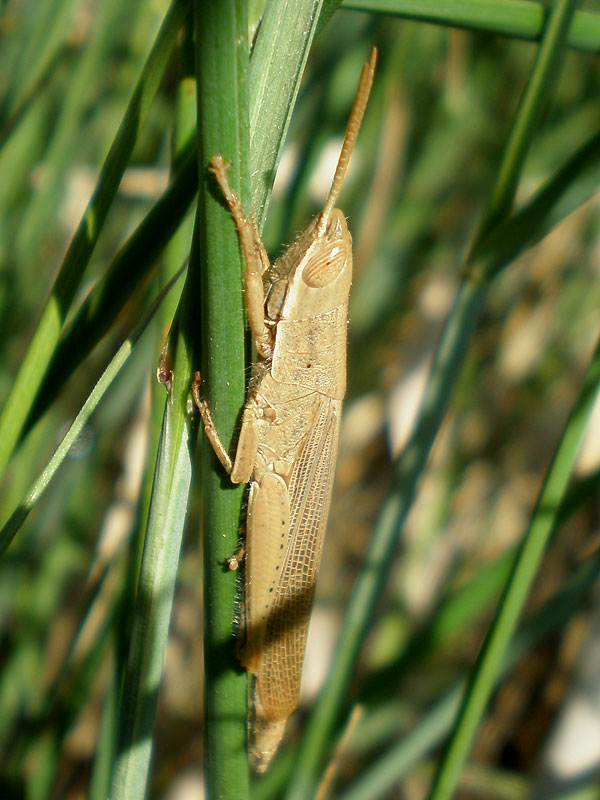
Tropidopola cylindrica (Tropidopolinae)

The Orthoptera Species File (September 2021) lists the following subfamilies of Acrididae. The numbers of genera and species are approximate and may change over time.

- Acridinae MacLeay, 1821 (140 genera, 470 species), Worldwide: temperate and tropical
- Calliptaminae Jacobson, 1905 (12 genera, 90 species), Africa, Europe, Asia
- Caryandinae Yin & Liu, 1987 (3 genera, 100 species), Africa, Asia
- Catantopinae Brunner von Wattenwyl, 1893 (325 genera, 990 species), Africa, Asia ("spur-throated grasshoppers")
- Copiocerinae Brunner von Wattenwyl, 1893 (22 genera, 90 species), Central & South America
- Coptacrinae Brunner von Wattenwyl, 1893 (20 genera, 110 species), Africa, Madagascar, tropical Asia
- Cyrtacanthacridinae Kirby, 1910 (38 genera, 170 species), Worldwide ("bird grasshoppers")
- Egnatiinae Bey-Bienko & Mistshenko, 1951 (30 species), Africa to central Asia
- Eremogryllinae Dirsh, 1956 (5 species), North Africa
  - Eremogryllus Krauss, 1902
  - Notopleura (grasshopper) Krauss, 1902
- Euryphyminae Dirsh, 1956 (23 genera, 80 species), Africa including Madagascar
- Eyprepocnemidinae Brunner von Wattenwyl, 1893 (26 genera, 150 species), Africa, mainland Europe, Asia
- Gomphocerinae Fieber, 1853 (192 genera, 1200 species), Worldwide
- Habrocneminae Yin, 1982 (15 species), China, Indochina
  - Habrocnemis Uvarov, 1930
  - Longzhouacris You & Bi, 1983 - China only
  - Menglacris Jiang & Zheng, 1994 (syn. Tectiacris Wei & Zheng, 2005)- China
- Hemiacridinae Dirsh, 1956 (45 genera, 180 species), Africa, Asia
- Incolacridinae Tinkham, 1940 (4 genera), East Asia
- Leptysminae Brunner von Wattenwyl, 1893 (21 genera, 70 species), Central and South America
- Marelliinae Eades, 2000 (monotypic, 1 species), South America
  - Marellia Uvarov, 1929
- Melanoplinae Scudder, 1897 (146 genera, 1100 species), Americas, Eurasia
- Oedipodinae Walker, 1871 (138 genera, 790 species), Worldwide
- Ommatolampidinae Brunner von Wattenwyl, 1893 (115 genera, 290 species), South America
- Oxyinae Brunner von Wattenwyl, 1893 (33 genera, 210 species), Sub-Saharan Africa, Asia, Australasia
- Pauliniinae Hebard, 1923 (monotypic, 1 species), South America
- Pezotettiginae Brunner von Wattenwyl, 1893 (10 species), Europe, western Asia, Middle East
- Proctolabinae Amédégnato, 1974 (29 genera, 210 species), Central and South America
- Rhytidochrotinae Brunner von Wattenwyl, 1893 (20 genera, 40 species), South America
- Spathosterninae Rehn, 1957 (single tribe, currently with 3 genera and 12 species), Africa, Indomalaya, Australia
- Teratodinae Brunner von Wattenwyl, 1893 (8 genera, 20 species), Africa, southwest Asia
- Tropidopolinae Jacobson, 1905 (13 genera, 30 species), Africa, southern Europe, Asia

=== incertae sedis ===
Tribe Eucopiocerini Descamps, 1975 - Central America

1. Chapulacris Descamps, 1975
2. Eucopiocera - monotypic E. rubripes Bruner, 1908
3. Halffterina Descamps, 1975
4. Leptalacris Descamps & Rowell, 1978 - monotypic L. fastigiata Descamps & Rowell, 1978

unplaced genera (all monotypic)

- Atopacris Amédégnato & Poulain, 1998
- Castetsia Bolívar, 1902
- Jumandiacris Amédégnato & Poulain, 1998
- Melliacris Ramme, 1941
- Palandella Amédégnato & Poulain, 1998
- Pileolum Bolívar, 1917
- Tylotropidiopsis Storozhenko, 1992
- †Heeracris Zeuner, 1937
- †Menatacridium Piton, 1936
- †Taeniopodites Cockerell, 1909
- †Tyrbula Scudder, 1885

== See also ==
- List of Acrididae genera
- List of Orthopteroid genera containing species recorded in Europe
