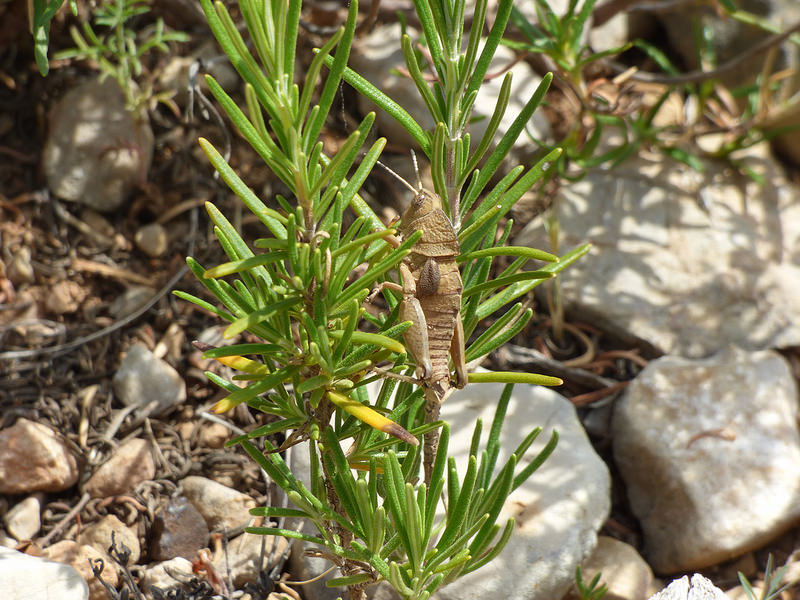
- Kurtharzia nugatoria

Scientific classification
- Domain: Eukaryota
- Kingdom: Animalia
- Phylum: Arthropoda
- Class: Insecta
- Order: Orthoptera
- Suborder: Caelifera
- Family: Pamphagidae
- Subfamily: Pamphaginae
- Tribe: Pamphagini
- Genus: Kurtharzia; Koçak, 1981

Synonyms
- Navasius Harz, 1973

= Kurtharzia =

Genus of grasshoppers

Kurtharzia is a genus of European grasshoppers belonging to the family Pamphagidae, erected by A.Ö. Koçak in 1981. Belonging to the tribe Pamphagini, species can be found in the Iberian Peninsula.

== Species ==
The Orthoptera Species File lists:

1. Kurtharzia nugatoria (Navás, 1909) - type species (as Pamphagus nugatorius Navás)
2. Kurtharzia sulcata (Bolívar, 1912)
