= Paranocarodes =

Scientific classification
- Domain: Eukaryota
- Kingdom: Animalia
- Phylum: Arthropoda
- Class: Insecta
- Order: Orthoptera
- Suborder: Caelifera
- Family: Pamphagidae
- Subfamily: Pamphaginae
- Tribe: Nocarodeini
- Genus: Paranocarodes; Bolívar, 1916

Synonyms
- Ananothrodes Demirsoy, 1973; Ananothrotes Mistshenko, 1951; Granulodes Ramme, 1951; Pseudosavalania Demirsoy, 1973; Pseudosavaliana Presa & García, 1983

Genus of grasshoppers

External image
- Images at iNaturalist

Paranocarodes is a genus of European and western Asian grasshoppers belonging to the family Pamphagidae, erected by Ignacio Bolívar in 1916. Belonging to the tribe Nocarodeini, species can be found from Greece through to Iran.

== Species ==
The Orthoptera Species File lists:

species group lubricus Mistshenko, 1951

1. Paranocarodes anatoliensis Demirsoy, 1973
2. Paranocarodes beieri (Ramme, 1951)
3. Paranocarodes brevipes Ramme, 1951
4. Paranocarodes chopardi Peshev, 1965
5. Paranocarodes lubricus Mistshenko, 1951
6. Paranocarodes turkmen Ünal, 2014

species group straubei (Fieber, 1853)

1. Paranocarodes fieberi (Brunner von Wattenwyl, 1882)
2. Paranocarodes karabagi (Demirsoy, 1973)
3. Paranocarodes straubei (Fieber, 1853) - type species (as Pamphagus straubei Fieber)
4. Paranocarodes tolunayi Ramme, 1949
