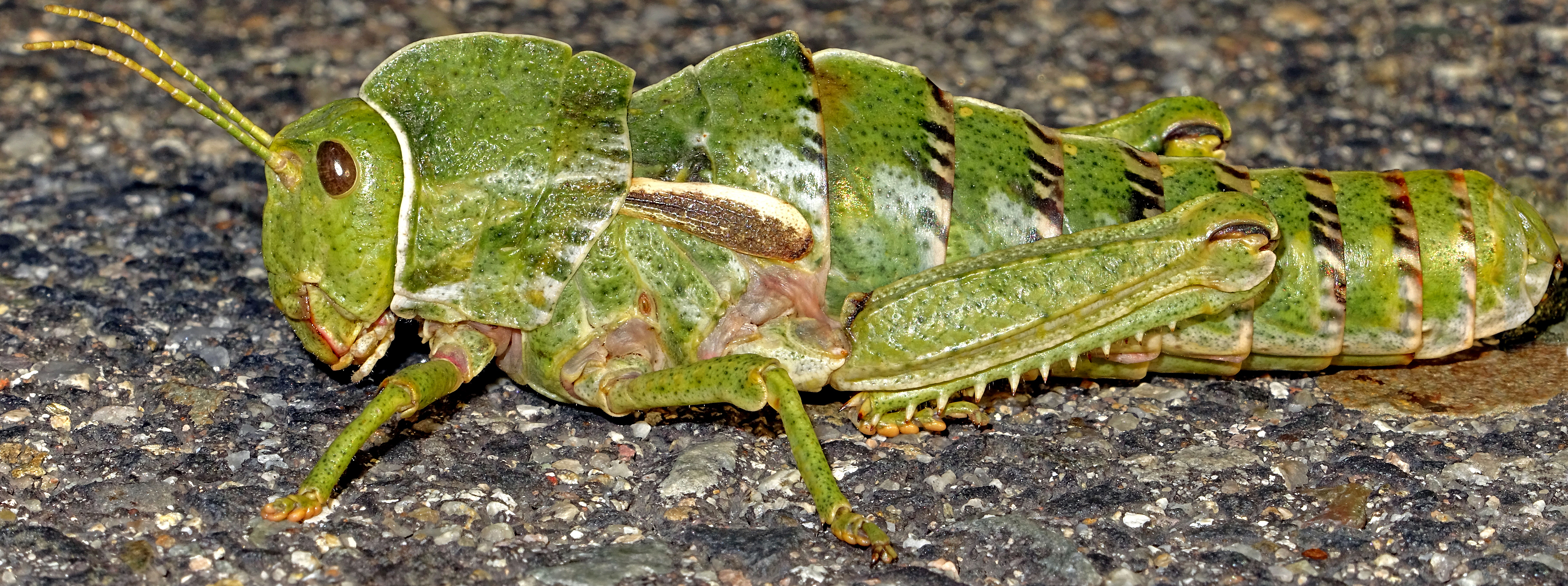
- P. sardeus, female

Scientific classification
- Kingdom: Animalia
- Phylum: Arthropoda
- Clade: Pancrustacea
- Class: Insecta
- Order: Orthoptera
- Suborder: Caelifera
- Family: Pamphagidae
- Subfamily: Pamphaginae
- Tribe: Pamphagini
- Genus: Pamphagus
- Species: P. sardeus

Binomial name
- Pamphagus sardeus (Herrich-Schäffer, 1840)

Synonyms
- Pamphagus marmoratus var. elegans Krauss (1914)

= Pamphagus sardeus =

Species of grasshopper

Pamphagus sardeus is a large species of Pamphagidae and one of the most massive Italian Orthoptera.

== Distribution and habitat ==
This species can be encountered exclusively in Sardinia, and is more frequently found in spring and summer in the southern part of the island, where it lives in dry natural grassland.

== Description ==
The adult males grow up to 45.9–61 millimetres (1.81–2.40 in) long, while females reach 55–70 millimetres (2.2–2.8 in). The overall shape is typical of Pamphagidae and very similar to Pamphagus marmoratus, to the point that for a long time this species was reported as P. marmoratus before the works by Harz (1969 and 1975) definitively separated it on the basis of the longer cerci, a different profile of the ultimate tergite and the shape of male genitalia.

== Biology ==
Pamphagus sardeus, like the other Pamphagidae, is herbivore. Adults, especially females, rarely jump, look quite torpid and clumsy and can be easily captured with the hands. Although relatively widespread, it's not easy to meet and it never occurs in large numbers.

A lab audio recording attributed to P. sardeus is available on the Orthoptera Species File website.

== Gallery ==
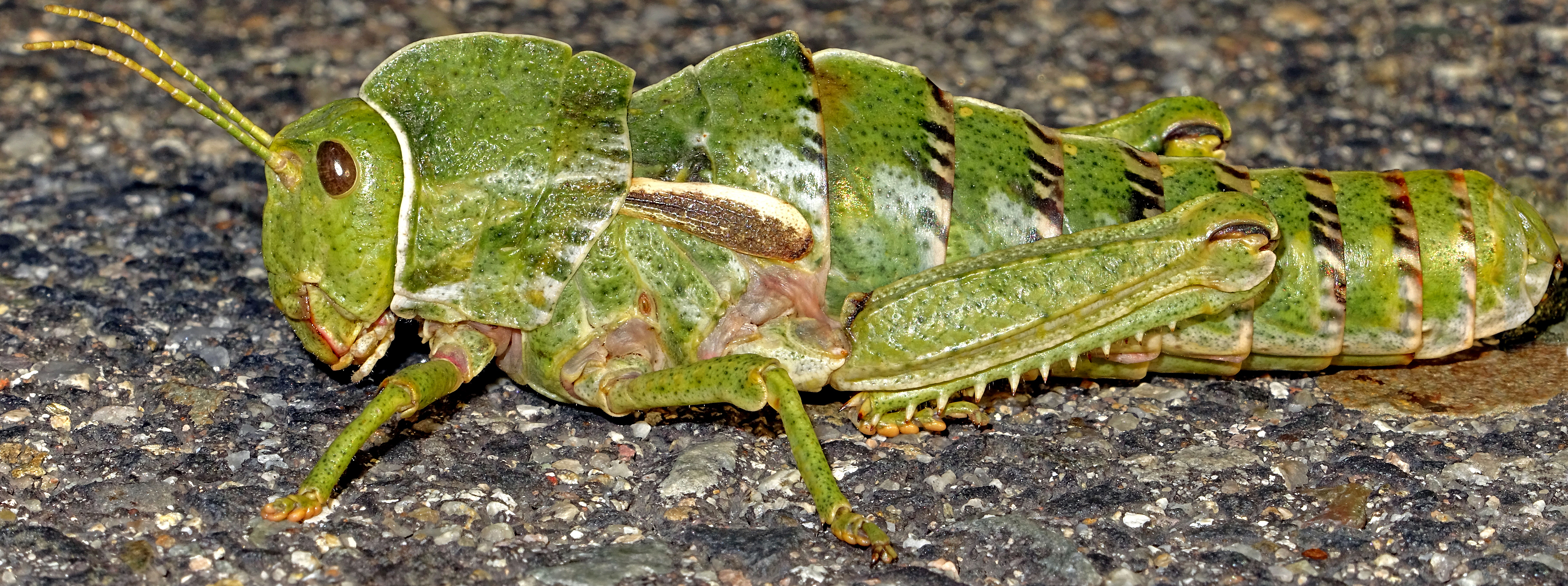
A female specimen of Sardinia's endemic Pamphagus sardeus (Herrich-Schäffer, 1840)
