= Orchamus (grasshopper) =

Scientific classification
- Domain: Eukaryota
- Kingdom: Animalia
- Phylum: Arthropoda
- Class: Insecta
- Order: Orthoptera
- Suborder: Caelifera
- Family: Pamphagidae
- Subfamily: Pamphaginae
- Tribe: Pamphagini
- Genus: Orchamus; Stål, 1876

Genus of grasshoppers

External image
- Image at iNaturalist

Orchamus is a genus of European and western Asian grasshoppers belonging to the family Pamphagidae, erected by Carl Stål in 1876. Belonging to the tribe Pamphagini, species can be found in Greece through to Israel and Jordan.

== Species ==
The Orthoptera Species File lists:

1. Orchamus gracilis (Brunner von Wattenwyl, 1882)
2. Orchamus hebraeus Uvarov, 1942
3. Orchamus kaltenbachi Massa, 2009
4. Orchamus massai Ünal, 2016
5. Orchamus raulinii (Lucas, 1854) - type species (as Acinipe raulinii Lucas, P.H.)
6. Orchamus yersini (Brunner von Wattenwyl, 1882)`
