= Glyphotmethis =

Scientific classification
- Domain: Eukaryota
- Kingdom: Animalia
- Phylum: Arthropoda
- Class: Insecta
- Order: Orthoptera
- Suborder: Caelifera
- Family: Pamphagidae
- Subfamily: Thrinchinae
- Tribe: Thrinchini
- Genus: Glyphotmethis; Bey-Bienko, 1951

Genus of grasshoppers

External image
- Images at iNaturalist

Glyphotmethis is a genus of mostly European grasshoppers belonging to the family Pamphagidae, established by Bey-Bienko in 1951. Part of the tribe Thrinchini, species of this genus can be found from south-eastern Europe to Turkey.

== Species ==
The Orthoptera Species File lists:

1. Glyphotmethis adaliae (Uvarov, 1928)
2. Glyphotmethis dimorphus (Uvarov, 1934) (2 subspecies)
3. Glyphotmethis efe Ünal, 2007
4. Glyphotmethis escherichi (Krauss, 1896) - type species (as Eremobia escherichi Krauss = G. escherichi escherichi, one of 3 subspecies)
5. Glyphotmethis heldreichi (Brunner von Wattenwyl, 1882)
6. Glyphotmethis holtzi (Werner, 1901) (4 subspecies)
7. Glyphotmethis ovipennis (Uvarov, 1934)
8. Glyphotmethis sevketi (Ramme, 1951)
