= Nocaracris =

Scientific classification
- Domain: Eukaryota
- Kingdom: Animalia
- Phylum: Arthropoda
- Class: Insecta
- Order: Orthoptera
- Suborder: Caelifera
- Family: Pamphagidae
- Subfamily: Pamphaginae
- Tribe: Nocarodeini
- Genus: Nocaracris; Uvarov, 1928

Synonyms
- Oronothrotes Mistshenko, 1951; Paranocaracris Mistshenko, 1951

Genus of grasshoppers

External image
- Images at iNaturalist

Nocaracris is a genus of European and western Asian grasshoppers in the family Pamphagidae, erected by Boris Uvarov in 1928. It is the type genus of the tribe Nocarodeini and has a recorded distribution of Greece through to Afghanistan, but this may be incomplete.

== Species ==
The Orthoptera Species File lists:

species group bodenheimeri (Uvarov, 1940)

1. Nocaracris bodenheimeri (Uvarov, 1940)
2. Nocaracris burri (Uvarov, 1949)
3. Nocaracris cejchani Ünal, 2016
4. Nocaracris cinerascens Ramme, 1951
5. Nocaracris emirdagi Ünal, 2016
6. Nocaracris idrisi (Karabag, 1953)
7. Nocaracris sureyana Ramme, 1951
8. Nocaracris tardus Ünal, Bugrov & Jetybayev, 2016
9. Nocaracris tauricola Ramme, 1951

species group bulgaricus (Ebner & Drenowski, 1930)

1. Nocaracris bulgaricus (Ebner & Drenowski, 1930)
2. Nocaracris furvus (Mistshenko, 1951)
3. Nocaracris istanbul Ünal, 2016

species group latipes Uvarov, 1928

1. Nocaracris karadagi Ünal, 2016
2. Nocaracris latipes Uvarov, 1928
3. Nocaracris minutus Ünal, 2016
4. Nocaracris monticolus Ünal, 2016
5. Nocaracris palandoken Ünal, 2016
6. Nocaracris van Ünal, 2016

species group niethammeri (Ramme, 1951)

1. Nocaracris crassipes Ünal, 2016
2. Nocaracris niethammeri (Ramme, 1951)

species group rimansonae (Uvarov, 1918)

1. Nocaracris granosus (Mistshenko, 1951)
2. Nocaracris kosswigi (Karabag, 1953)
3. Nocaracris rimansonae (Uvarov, 1918)
4. Nocaracris tunceli Ünal, 2016

species group rubripes (Motschulsky, 1846)

1. Nocaracris acinosus (Mistshenko, 1951)
2. Nocaracris curtus Mistshenko, 1951
3. Nocaracris cyanipes (Fischer von Waldheim, 1846) - type species
4. Nocaracris demirsoyi (Ünal, 2002)
5. Nocaracris judithae Ünal, 2016
6. Nocaracris pontica Ramme, 1951
7. Nocaracris rubripes (Motschulsky, 1846)

species group tridentatus (Stshelkanovtzev, 1916)

1. Nocaracris bicoloripes (Uvarov, 1949)
2. Nocaracris citripes (Uvarov, 1949)
3. Nocaracris dilekensis Ünal, 2016
4. Nocaracris elegans (Mistshenko, 1951)
5. Nocaracris goektepe Ünal, 2016
6. Nocaracris karshitoros Ünal, 2016
7. Nocaracris sabulosa Ramme, 1951
8. Nocaracris subrubrata Ramme, 1951
9. Nocaracris tecticollis Ramme, 1951
10. Nocaracris tridentatus (Stshelkanovtzev, 1916)
