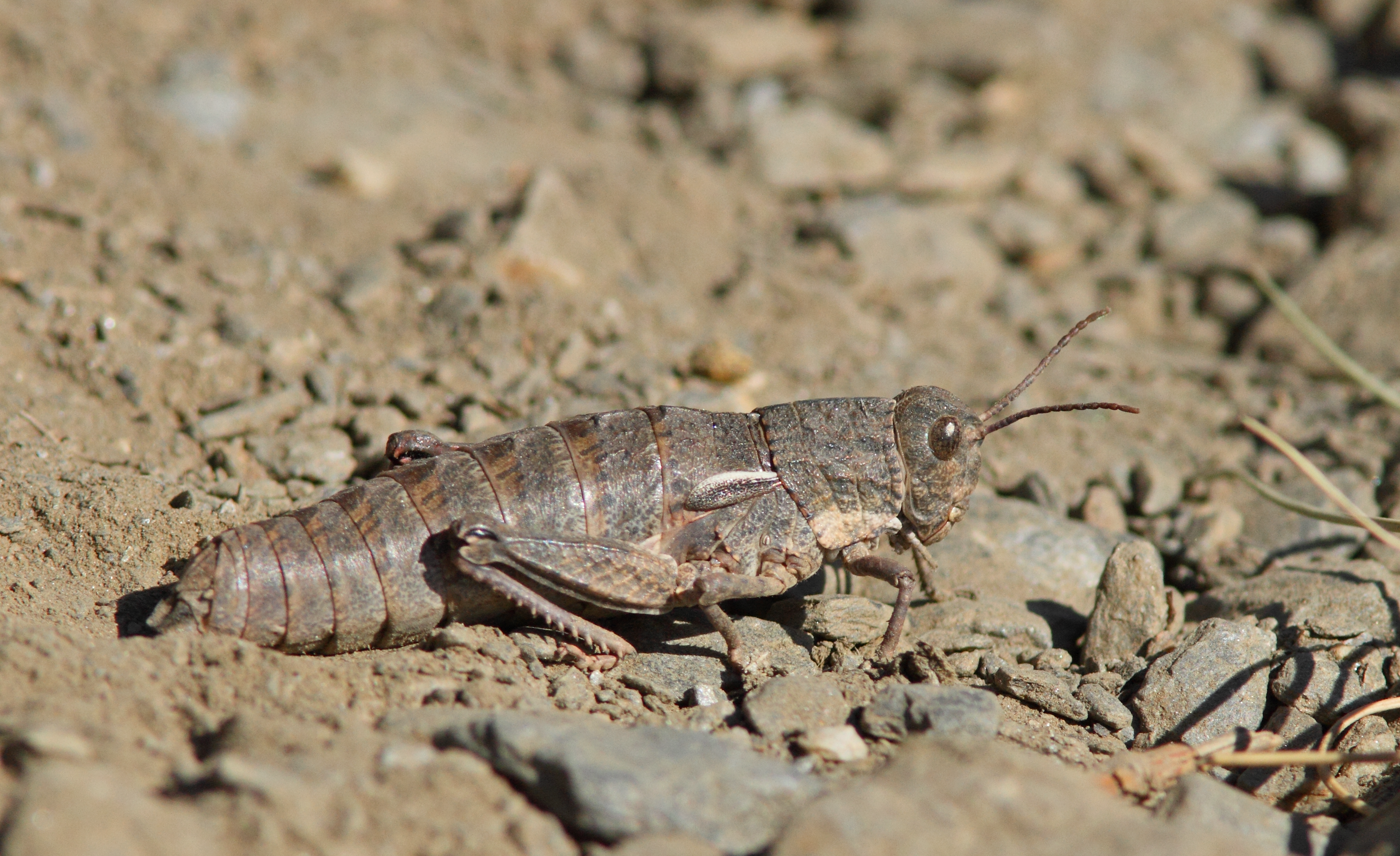
- Eumigus rubioi

Scientific classification
- Domain: Eukaryota
- Kingdom: Animalia
- Phylum: Arthropoda
- Class: Insecta
- Order: Orthoptera
- Suborder: Caelifera
- Family: Pamphagidae
- Tribe: Pamphagini
- Genus: Eumigus; Bolívar, 1878

= Eumigus =

Genus of grasshoppers

Eumigus is a genus of grasshoppers in the family Pamphagidae. There are about five described species in Eumigus, found in southern Europe and North Africa.

== Species ==
These five species belong to the genus Eumigus:

- Eumigus ayresi Bolívar, 1912
- Eumigus cucullatus (Bolívar, 1878)
- Eumigus monticola (Rambur, 1838)
- Eumigus punctatus (Bolívar, 1902)
- Eumigus rubioi Harz, 1973
