= Asiotmethis =

Scientific classification
- Domain: Eukaryota
- Kingdom: Animalia
- Phylum: Arthropoda
- Class: Insecta
- Order: Orthoptera
- Suborder: Caelifera
- Family: Pamphagidae
- Subfamily: Thrinchinae
- Tribe: Thrinchini
- Genus: Asiotmethis; Uvarov, 1943

Genus of grasshoppers

External image
- Images at iNaturalist

Asiotmethis is a genus of European and Western Asian grasshoppers belonging to the family Pamphagidae, erected by Boris Uvarov in 1943. Belonging to the tribe Thrinchini, the species can be found in Greece through to Iran and central Asia.

== Species ==
The Orthoptera Species File lists:

1. Asiotmethis artemisianus Shumakov, 1949
2. Asiotmethis bifurcatus Liu & Bi, 1994
3. Asiotmethis heptapotamicus (Zubovski, 1898)
4. Asiotmethis jubatus (Uvarov, 1926)
5. Asiotmethis limbatus (Charpentier, 1845)
6. Asiotmethis muricatus (Pallas, 1771) - type species (as Gryllus muricatus Pallas)
7. Asiotmethis nigripedis Steinmann, 1966
8. Asiotmethis serricornis (Fischer von Waldheim, 1846)
9. Asiotmethis similis Bey-Bienko, 1951
10. Asiotmethis tauricus (Tarbinsky, 1930)
11. Asiotmethis turritus (Fischer von Waldheim, 1833)
12. Asiotmethis zacharjini (Bey-Bienko, 1926)
