= Dhofaria =

Scientific classification
- Domain: Eukaryota
- Kingdom: Animalia
- Phylum: Arthropoda
- Class: Insecta
- Order: Orthoptera
- Suborder: Caelifera
- Family: Pamphagidae
- Subfamily: Thrinchinae
- Tribe: Thrinchini
- Genus: Dhofaria; Popov, 1985
- Species: D. splendens

Binomial name
- Dhofaria splendens (Popov, 198)

Synonyms
- Dhofaria Koçak & Kemal, 2008; Omania Popov, 1980

Genus of grasshoppers

Dhofaria is a monotypic genus of grasshoppers in the family Pamphagidae and tribe Thrinchini, erected by George Popov in 1985. It contains the single species Dhofaria splendens (Popov, 1980) (previously placed in the occupied genus Omania Horváth, 1915 - Hemiptera: Omaniidae), recorded from Oman and the United Arab Emirates.
