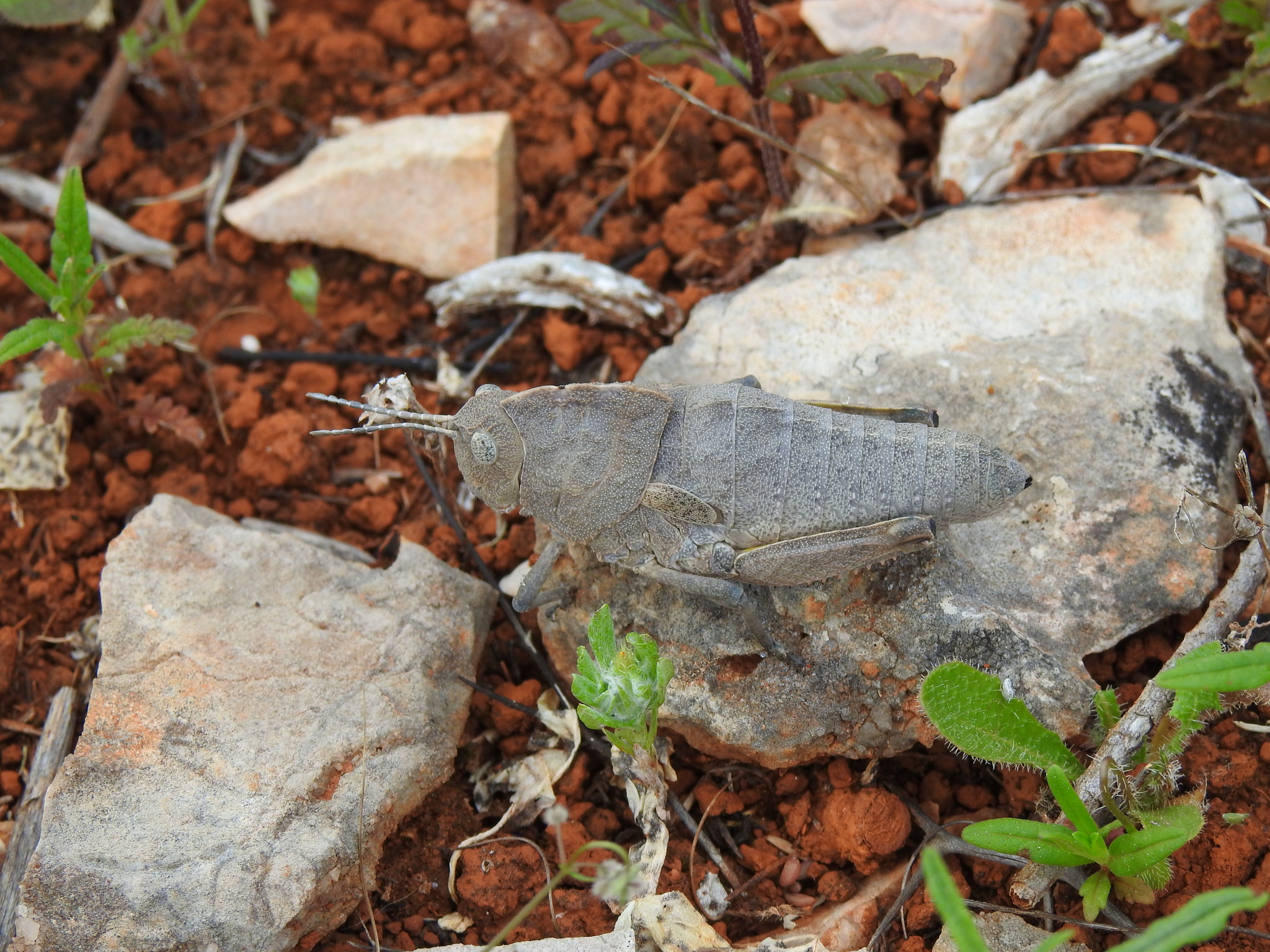
- Ocnerodes fallaciosus

Scientific classification
- Domain: Eukaryota
- Kingdom: Animalia
- Phylum: Arthropoda
- Class: Insecta
- Order: Orthoptera
- Suborder: Caelifera
- Family: Pamphagidae
- Subfamily: Pamphaginae
- Tribe: Pamphagini
- Genus: Ocnerodes; Brunner von Wattenwyl, 1882

= Ocnerodes =

Genus of grasshoppers

Ocnerodes is a genus of European grasshoppers belonging to the family Pamphagidae, erected by Carl Brunner von Wattenwyl in 1882. Belonging to the tribe Pamphagini, species can be found in the Iberian Peninsula.

== Species ==
The Orthoptera Species File lists:

1. Ocnerodes brunnerii (Bolívar, 1876) - type species (2 subspecies: O. brunnerii brunnerii was Acocera brunnerii Bolívar, I.)
2. Ocnerodes fallaciosus Bolívar, 1912
3. Ocnerodes prosternalis Bolívar, 1912
4. Ocnerodes soleri Llorente del Moral & Presa, 1983
