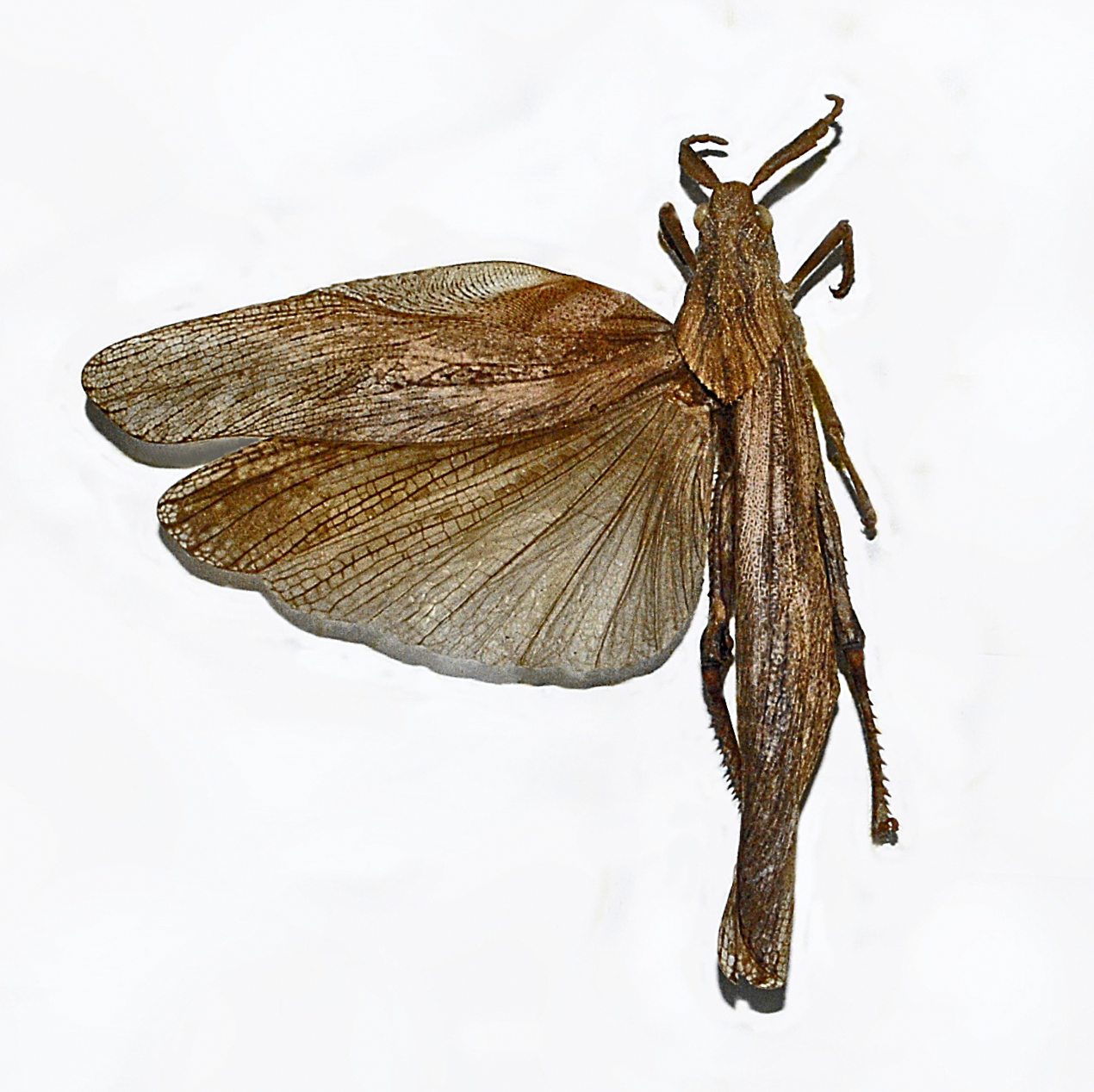
- Xiphoceriana atrox. Museum specimen

Scientific classification
- Kingdom: Animalia
- Phylum: Arthropoda
- Class: Insecta
- Order: Orthoptera
- Suborder: Caelifera
- Family: Pamphagidae
- Genus: Xiphoceriana
- Species: X. atrox

Binomial name
- Xiphoceriana atrox (Gerstaecker, 1869)

Synonyms
- Pamphagus atrox Gerstaecker, 1869; Xiphocera stuhlmanniana Karsch, 1896

= Xiphoceriana atrox =

Species of grasshopper

Xiphoceriana atrox is a species of grasshoppers belonging to the family Pamphagidae.

== Description ==
Xiphoceriana atrox can reach a length of 70 millimetres (2.8 in) in males, of 55 millimetres (2.2 in) in females.

== Distribution ==
This species is present in Africa, East Tropical Africa, Tanzania.

== Bibliography ==
- Bolívar, I. (1916) Orthoptera. Fam. Acrididae. Subfam. Pamphaginae, Genera Insectorum, V. Verteneuil & L. Desmet, Brussels 170:40 pp., 1 pl
- Dirsh (1956) The phallic complex in Acridoidea (Orthoptera) in relation to taxonomy, Transactions of the Royal Entomological Society of London (Trans. R. Entomol. Soc. London) 108(7):223-356
- Dirsh (1958) Revision of the group Portheti (Orthoptera: Acridoidea), Eos, Revista española de Entomología (Eos) 34:299-400
- Dirsh (1965), The African Genera of Acridoidea, Cambridge University Press, Antilocust Centre, London 579 pp.
- Gerstaecker (1869), Archiv für Naturgeschichte, Leipzig (N.F.) (Arch. Naturgesch., Leipzig (N.F.)) 35(1)
- Hemp, C. (2009) Annotated list of Caelifera (Orthoptera) of Mt. Kilimanjaro, Journal of Orthoptera Research (Jour. Orth. Res.) 18(2):183–214
- Johnston, H.B. (1956), Annotated catalogue of African grasshoppers, The Cambridge University Press, Cambridge 833 pp.
- Johnston, H.B. (1968), Annotated catalogue of African grasshoppers, The Cambridge University Press, Cambridge Suppl:448 pp.
- Karsch (1896) Neue Orthopteren aus dem tropischen Afrika, Stettiner Entomologische Zeitung (Stett. Entomol. Z.) 57:242-359
- Kevan, D.K.M. (1957) Orthoptera-Caelifera from northern Kenya and Jubaland. II. Pamphagidae, Pyrgomorphidae, Lentulidae and Romaleinae, Opuscula Entomologica, Lund (Opuscula Entomologica) 22:193-208
- Uvarov (1966), Grasshoppers & Locusts. A Handbook of General Acridology, Cambridge University Press, London 1:481 pp.
