= Xiphoceriana cristata =

Scientific classification
- Kingdom: Animalia
- Phylum: Arthropoda
- Class: Insecta
- Order: Orthoptera
- Suborder: Caelifera
- Family: Pamphagidae
- Genus: Xiphoceriana
- Species: X. cristata

Binomial name
- Xiphoceriana cristata (Saussure, 1887)

Species of grasshopper

Xiphoceriana cristata is a species of grasshoppers belonging to the family Pamphagidae.
