= Ocneridia =

Scientific classification
- Domain: Eukaryota
- Kingdom: Animalia
- Phylum: Arthropoda
- Class: Insecta
- Order: Orthoptera
- Suborder: Caelifera
- Family: Pamphagidae
- Subfamily: Pamphaginae
- Tribe: Pamphagini
- Genus: Ocneridia; Bolívar, 1912

Synonyms
- Ariasa Bolívar, 1912; Ariasius Uvarov, 1939

Genus of grasshoppers

Ocneridia is a genus of African and European grasshoppers belonging to the family Pamphagidae, erected by Ignacio Bolívar in 1912. Belonging to the tribe Pamphagini, species can be found in northern Africa and some Mediterranean islands including Sicily.

== Species ==
The Orthoptera Species File lists:

1. Ocneridia microptera (Brisout de Barneville, 1850)
2. Ocneridia nigropunctata (Lucas, 1847) - type species (as Porthetis canonicus Fischer)
3. Ocneridia volxemii (Bolívar, 1878)
