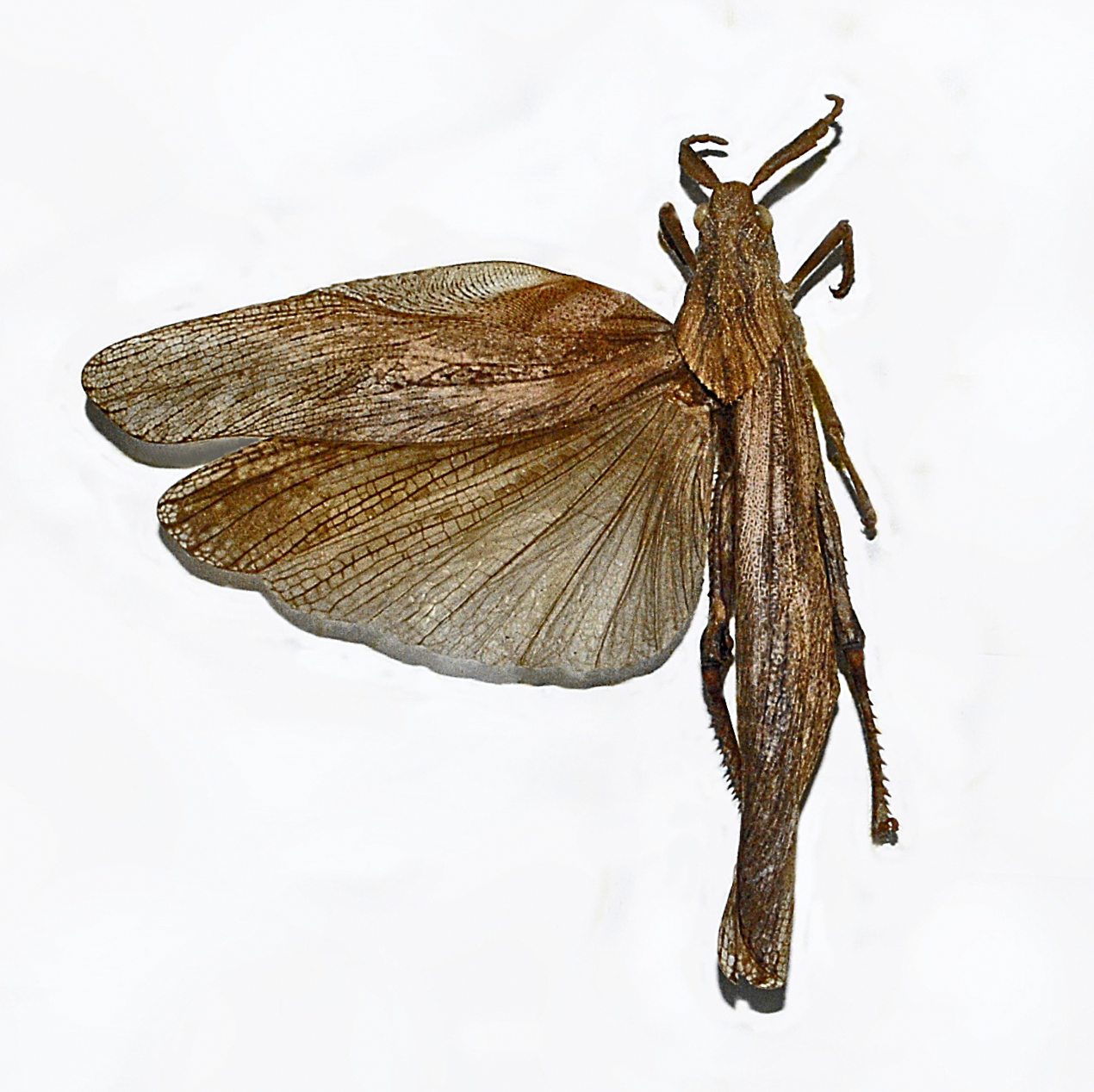
- Xiphoceriana atrox

Scientific classification
- Domain: Eukaryota
- Kingdom: Animalia
- Phylum: Arthropoda
- Class: Insecta
- Order: Orthoptera
- Suborder: Caelifera
- Family: Pamphagidae
- Subfamily: Porthetinae
- Genus: Xiphoceriana; Dirsh, 1958

= Xiphoceriana =

Genus of grasshoppers

Xiphoceriana is a genus of grasshoppers belonging to the family Pamphagidae.

== Species ==
- Xiphoceriana arabica (Uvarov, 1922)
- Xiphoceriana atrox (Gerstaecker, 1869)
- Xiphoceriana brunneriana (Saussure, 1887)
- Xiphoceriana cristata (Saussure, 1887)
