= Acrostira =

Scientific classification
- Domain: Eukaryota
- Kingdom: Animalia
- Phylum: Arthropoda
- Class: Insecta
- Order: Orthoptera
- Suborder: Caelifera
- Family: Pamphagidae
- Genus: Acrostira; Enderlein, 1929

Type species
- Acrostira bellamyi (Uvarov, 1922)

Genus of grasshoppers

Acrostira is a genus of grasshoppers in the subfamily Pamphaginae, with species found in the Canary Islands.

== Species ==
The following species are recognised in the genus Acrostira:

- Acrostira bellamyi (Uvarov, 1922)
- Acrostira euphorbiae Garcia-Becerra & Oromí, 1992
- Acrostira tamarani Baez, 1984
- Acrostira tenerifae Perez & López, 2005
