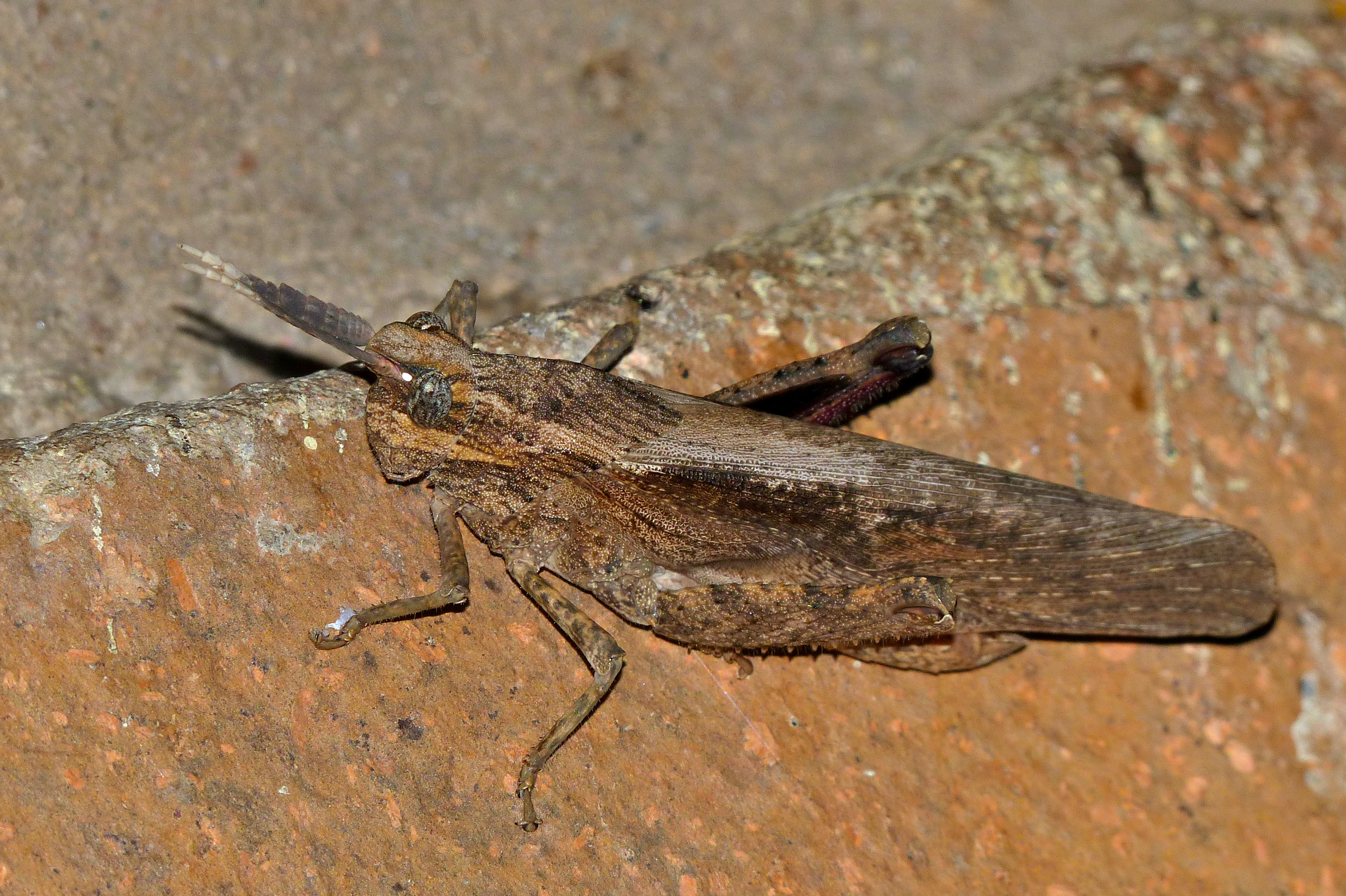
- Giant Rain Locust, Lamarckiana cucullata (male)

Scientific classification
- Domain: Eukaryota
- Kingdom: Animalia
- Phylum: Arthropoda
- Class: Insecta
- Order: Orthoptera
- Suborder: Caelifera
- Family: Pamphagidae
- Subfamily: Porthetinae
- Genus: Lamarckiana; Kirby, 1910

= Lamarckiana =

Genus of grasshoppers

Lamarckiana is a genus of grasshoppers in the family Pamphagidae. There are about five described species in Lamarckiana, found in southern and eastern Africa.

== Species ==
These five species belong to the genus Lamarckiana:

- Lamarckiana bolivariana (Saussure, 1887)
- Lamarckiana cucullata (Stoll, 1813)
- Lamarckiana nasuta (Saussure, 1887)
- Lamarckiana punctosa (Walker, 1870)
- Lamarckiana sparrmani (Stål, 1876)
