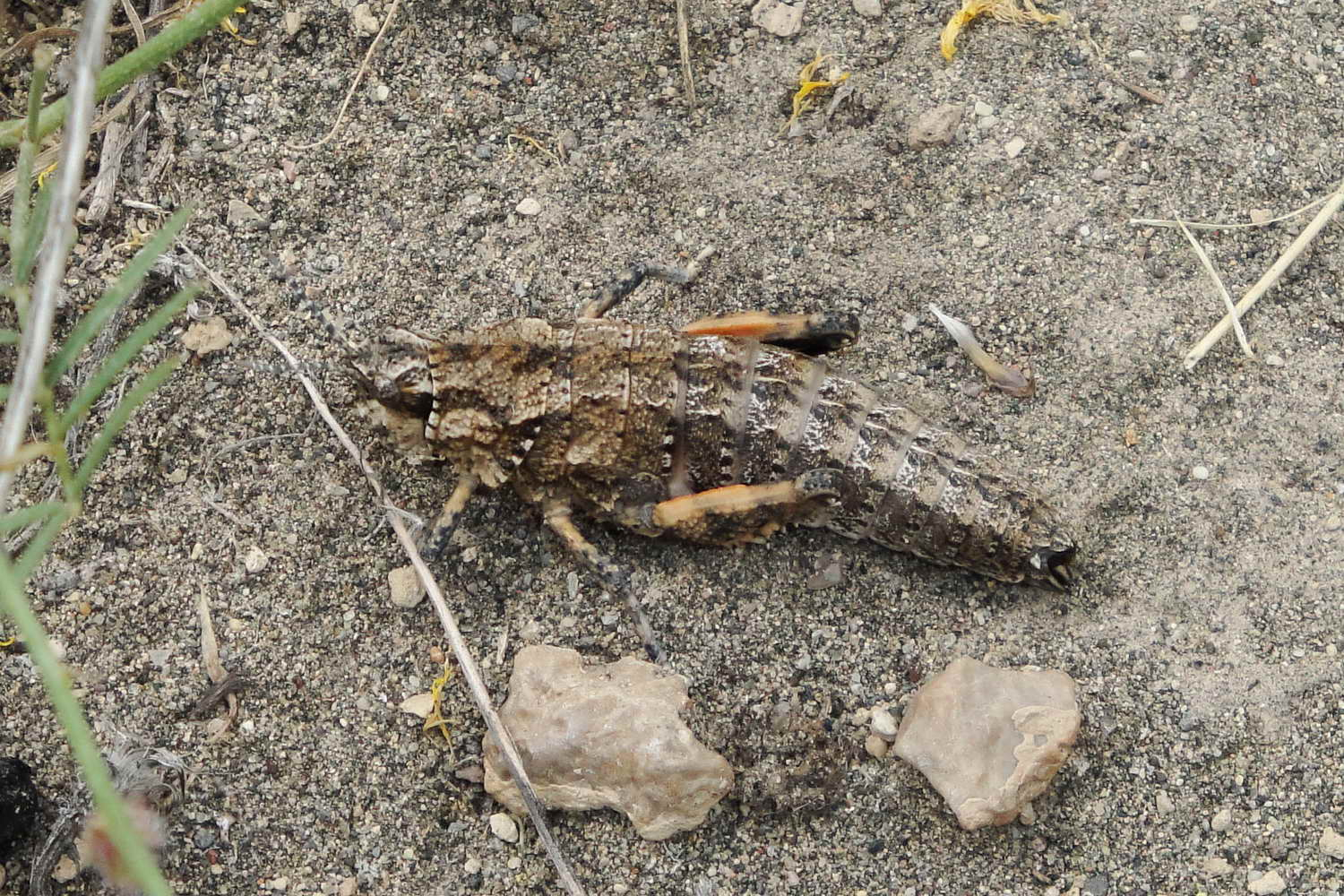
- Nocarodes nodosus

Scientific classification
- Domain: Eukaryota
- Kingdom: Animalia
- Phylum: Arthropoda
- Class: Insecta
- Order: Orthoptera
- Suborder: Caelifera
- Family: Pamphagidae
- Tribe: Nocarodeini
- Genus: Nocarodes; Fischer von Waldheim, 1846

= Nocarodes =

Genus of grasshoppers

Nocarodes is a genus of grasshoppers in the family Pamphagidae. There are at least 20 described species in Nocarodes, found in southeastern Europe and southwestern Asia.

== Species ==
These 20 species belong to the genus Nocarodes:

- Nocarodes aserbus Mistshenko, 1951
- Nocarodes balachowskyi Descamps, 1967
- Nocarodes corrugatus Mistshenko, 1951
- Nocarodes crispus Mistshenko, 1951
- Nocarodes daghestanicus Uvarov, 1928
- Nocarodes ebneri Ramme, 1951
- Nocarodes geniculatus Uvarov, 1928
- Nocarodes humerosus Mistshenko, 1951
- Nocarodes iranicus (Werner, 1939)
- Nocarodes keredjensis (Werner, 1939)
- Nocarodes liebmanni (Werner, 1939)
- Nocarodes nanus Mistshenko, 1951
- Nocarodes nodosus Mistshenko, 1951
- Nocarodes pullus (Mistshenko, 1951)
- Nocarodes sanctidavidi (Shugurov, 1912)
- Nocarodes scabiosus Mistshenko, 1951
- Nocarodes serricollis Fischer von Waldheim, 1846
- Nocarodes urmianus Ramme, 1939
- Nocarodes variegatus Fischer von Waldheim, 1846
- Nocarodes znojkoi Miram, 1938
