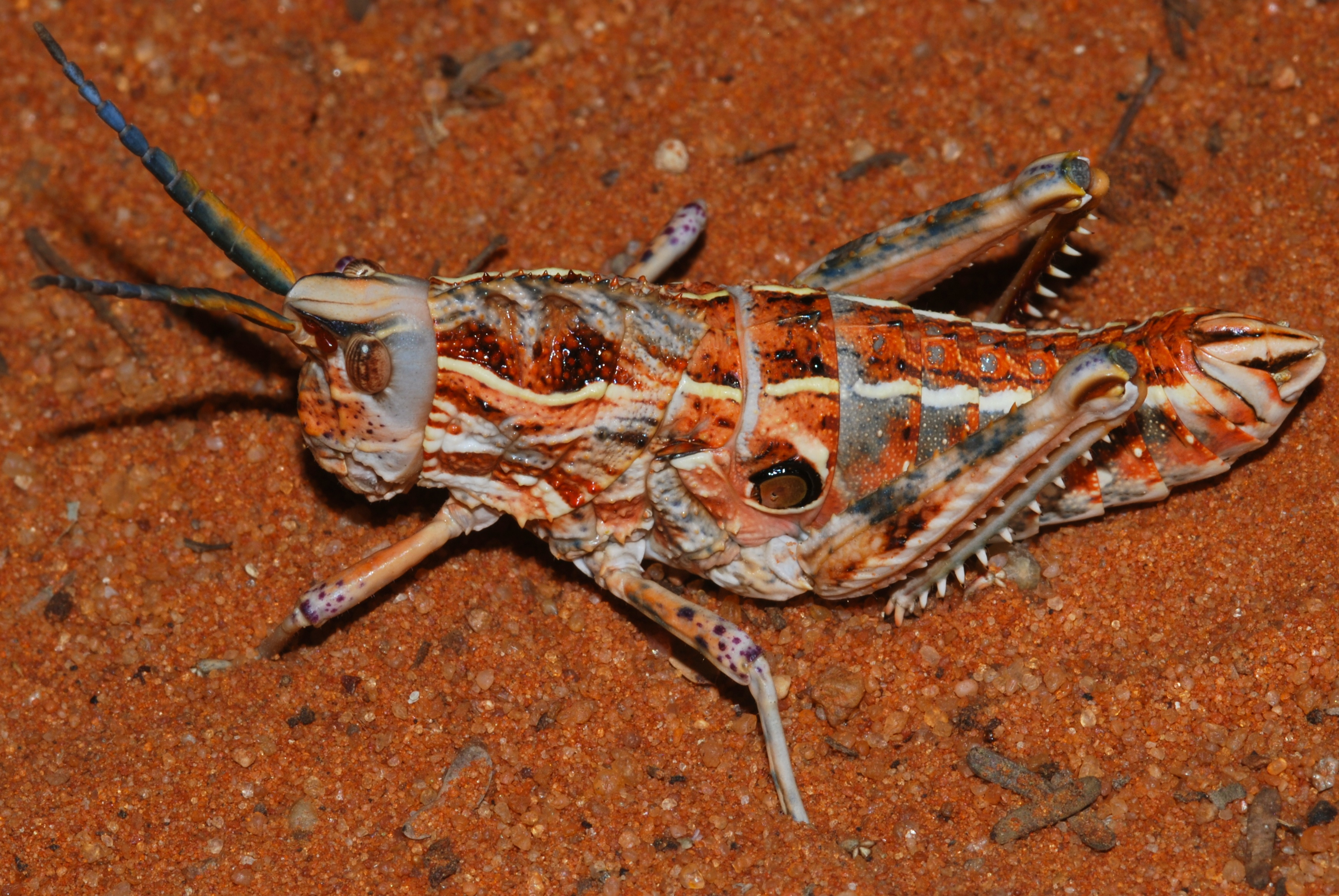
- Hoplolopha sp.

Scientific classification
- Domain: Eukaryota
- Kingdom: Animalia
- Phylum: Arthropoda
- Class: Insecta
- Order: Orthoptera
- Suborder: Caelifera
- Family: Pamphagidae
- Subfamily: Porthetinae; Bolívar, 1916

= Porthetinae =

Subfamily of grasshoppers

Porthetinae is a subfamily of grasshopers, with genus found in Africa and Asia (Arabia).

== Genera ==
The following genus are recognised in the subfamily Porthetinae:

- Trachypetrella Kirby, 1910
- Aphantotropis Uvarov, 1924
- Bolivarella Saussure, 1887
- Cultrinotus Bolívar, 1915
- Hoplolopha Stål, 1876
- Lamarckiana Kirby, 1910
- Lobosceliana Dirsh, 1958
- Pagopedilum Karsch, 1896
- Porthetis Serville, 1831
- Puncticornia Dirsh, 1958
- Transvaaliana Dirsh, 1958
- Vansoniacris Dirsh, 1958
- Xiphoceriana Dirsh, 1958
