= Iranotmethis =

Scientific classification
- Domain: Eukaryota
- Kingdom: Animalia
- Phylum: Arthropoda
- Class: Insecta
- Order: Orthoptera
- Suborder: Caelifera
- Family: Pamphagidae
- Tribe: Thrinchini
- Genus: Iranotmethis; Uvarov, 1943

Type species
- Iranotmethis cyanipennis (Saussure, 1888)

Genus of grasshoppers

Iranotmethis is a genus of grasshoppers in the subfamily Thrinchinae, with species found in Iran.

== Species ==
The following species are recognised in the genus Iranotmethis:

- Iranotmethis cyanipennis (Saussure, 1884)
- Iranotmethis luteipes Bey-Bienko, 1951
- Iranotmethis persa (Saussure, 1888)
