= Ocneropsis =

Scientific classification
- Domain: Eukaryota
- Kingdom: Animalia
- Phylum: Arthropoda
- Class: Insecta
- Order: Orthoptera
- Suborder: Caelifera
- Family: Pamphagidae
- Genus: Ocneropsis; Uvarov, 1942

Genus of insects

Ocneropsis is a genus of grasshoppers belonging to the family Pamphagidae.

The species of this genus are found in Middle East.

Species:

- Ocneropsis bethlehemita (Bolívar, 1893)
