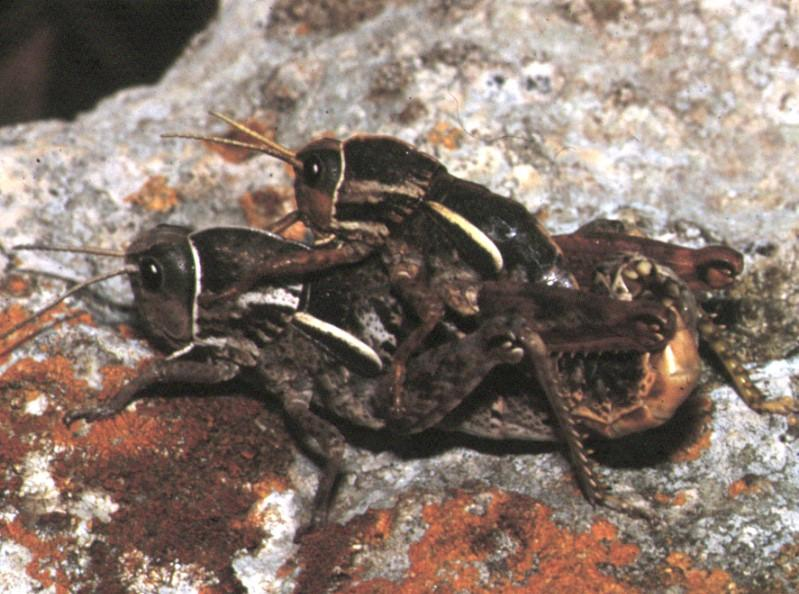
- Pamphagus ortolaniae

Scientific classification
- Kingdom: Animalia
- Phylum: Arthropoda
- Class: Insecta
- Order: Orthoptera
- Suborder: Caelifera
- Family: Pamphagidae
- Subfamily: Pamphaginae; Burmeister, 1840

= Pamphaginae =

Subfamily of grasshoppers

Pamphaginae is a subfamily of grasshoppers in the family Pamphagidae, with species found in Africa, Europe and Asia.

== Tribes and Genera ==
The following genera are recognised in the subfamily Pamphaginae:

=== Euryparyphini ===
Auth: La Greca, 1993

1. Eunapiodes Bolívar, 1907
2. Euryparyphes Fischer, 1853
3. Nadigeumigus La Greca, 1993
4. Paraeumigus Bolívar, 1914
5. Paraeuryparyphes La Greca, 1993

=== Finotiini ===
Auth: Bolívar, 1916 (monotypic)

1. Finotia Bonnet, 1884

=== Nocarodeini ===
Auth: Bolívar, 1916

1. Araxiana Mistshenko, 1951
2. Bufonocarodes Mistshenko, 1951
3. Ebnerodes Ramme, 1951
4. Eunothrotes Adelung, 1907
5. Iranacris Mistshenko, 1951
6. Neoparanothrotes Mirzayans, 1991
7. Nocaracris Uvarov, 1928
8. Nocarodes Fischer von Waldheim, 1846
9. Paranocarodes Bolívar, 1916
10. Paranothrotes Mistshenko, 1951
11. Pseudonothrotes Mistshenko, 1951
12. Turkanocaracris Ünal, 2016

=== Pamphagini ===
Auth: Burmeister, 1840

1. Acaeropa Uvarov, 1927
2. Acinipe Rambur, 1838
3. Amigus Bolívar, 1914
4. Eumigus Bolívar, 1878
5. Glauia Bolívar, 1912
6. Glauvarovia Morales-Agacino, 1945
7. Kurtharzia Koçak, 1981
8. Ocneridia Bolívar, 1912
9. Ocnerodes Brunner von Wattenwyl, 1882
10. Ocneropsis Uvarov, 1942
11. Ocnerosthenus Massa, 1995
12. Orchamus Stål, 1876
13. Pamphagus Thunberg, 1815
14. Paracinipe Descamps & Mounassif, 1972
15. Prionosthenus Bolívar, 1878
16. Pseudamigus Chopard, 1943
17. Pseudoglauia Morales-Agacino & Descamps, 1968

=== Tropidauchenini ===
Auth: Zhang, Yin & Yin, 2003

1. Saxetania Mistshenko, 1951
2. Tropidauchen Saussure, 1887

=== Incertae sedis ===
1. Acrostira Enderlein, 1929
2. Purpuraria Enderlein, 1929
