= Pagopedilum =

Scientific classification
- Domain: Eukaryota
- Kingdom: Animalia
- Phylum: Arthropoda
- Class: Insecta
- Order: Orthoptera
- Suborder: Caelifera
- Family: Pamphagidae
- Genus: Pagopedilum; Karsch, 1896

Type species
- Pagopedilum subcruciatum Karsch, 1896

Genus of grasshoppers

Pagopedilum is a genus of grasshoppers in the subfamily Porthetinae, with species found in the south of Africa.

== Species ==
The following species are recognised in the genus Pagopedilum:

- Pagopedilum angusticornis (Dirsh, 1958)
- Pagopedilum bradyanum (Saussure, 1887)
- Pagopedilum brevis (Walker, 1870)
- Pagopedilum giliomeei (Johnsen, 1990)
- Pagopedilum martini Bolívar, 1915
- Pagopedilum minor (Dirsh, 1958)
- Pagopedilum sabulosum (Stål, 1875)
- Pagopedilum sordidum (Walker, 1870)
- Pagopedilum subcruciatum Karsch, 1896
