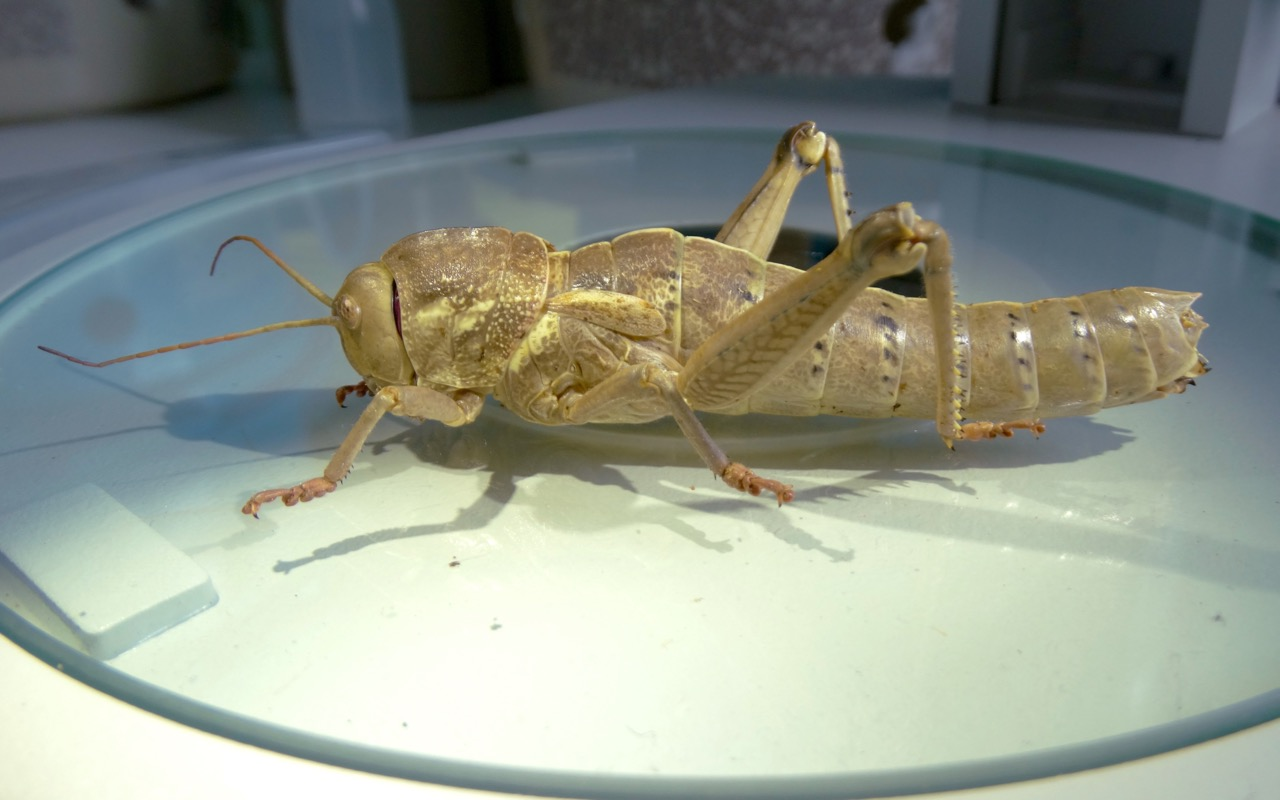
- Paracinipe dolichocera

Scientific classification
- Domain: Eukaryota
- Kingdom: Animalia
- Phylum: Arthropoda
- Class: Insecta
- Order: Orthoptera
- Suborder: Caelifera
- Family: Pamphagidae
- Tribe: Pamphagini
- Genus: Paracinipe; Descamps & Mounassif, 1972

= Paracinipe =

Genus of grasshoppers

Paracinipe is a genus of grasshoppers in the family Pamphagidae. There are about 18 described species in Paracinipe, found in northern Africa and the Middle East.

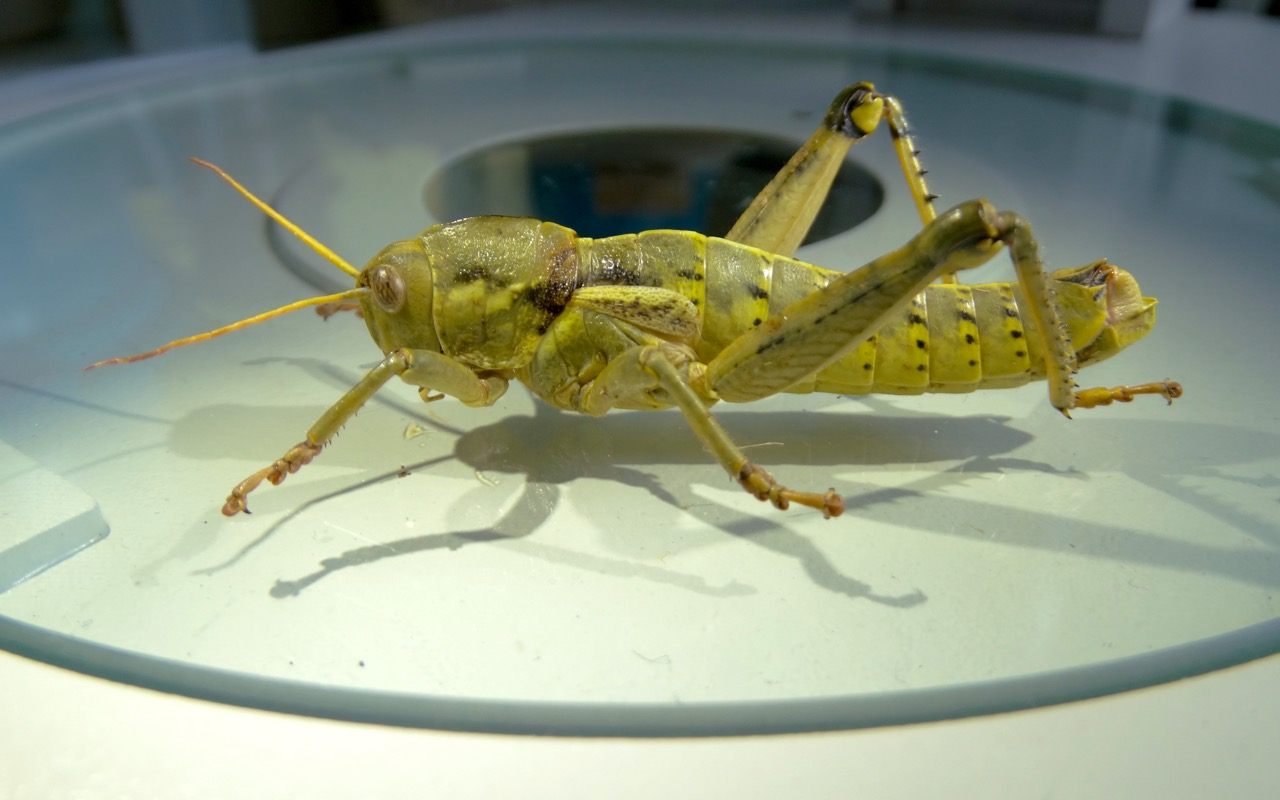
Paracinipe dolichocera

== Species ==
These 18 species belong to the genus Paracinipe:

- Paracinipe adelaidae Massa, 1996
- Paracinipe alticola (Werner, 1932)
- Paracinipe baccettii Massa, 1996
- Paracinipe crassicornis (Bolívar, 1907)
- Paracinipe dolichocera (Bolívar, 1907)
- Paracinipe exarata (Bolívar, 1936)
- Paracinipe foreli (Pictet & Saussure, 1893)
- Paracinipe luteipes Descamps & Mounassif, 1972
- Paracinipe luteomaculata Descamps & Mounassif, 1972
- Paracinipe marmarica (Salfi, 1925)
- Paracinipe mauritanica (Bolívar, 1878)
- Paracinipe orientalis (Werner, 1908)
- Paracinipe rubripes Descamps & Mounassif, 1972
- Paracinipe saharae (Pictet & Saussure, 1893)
- Paracinipe suezensis Ünal & Massa, 2016
- Paracinipe sulphuripes (Uvarov, 1942)
- Paracinipe theryi (Werner, 1931)
- Paracinipe zebrata (Brunner von Wattenwyl, 1882)
