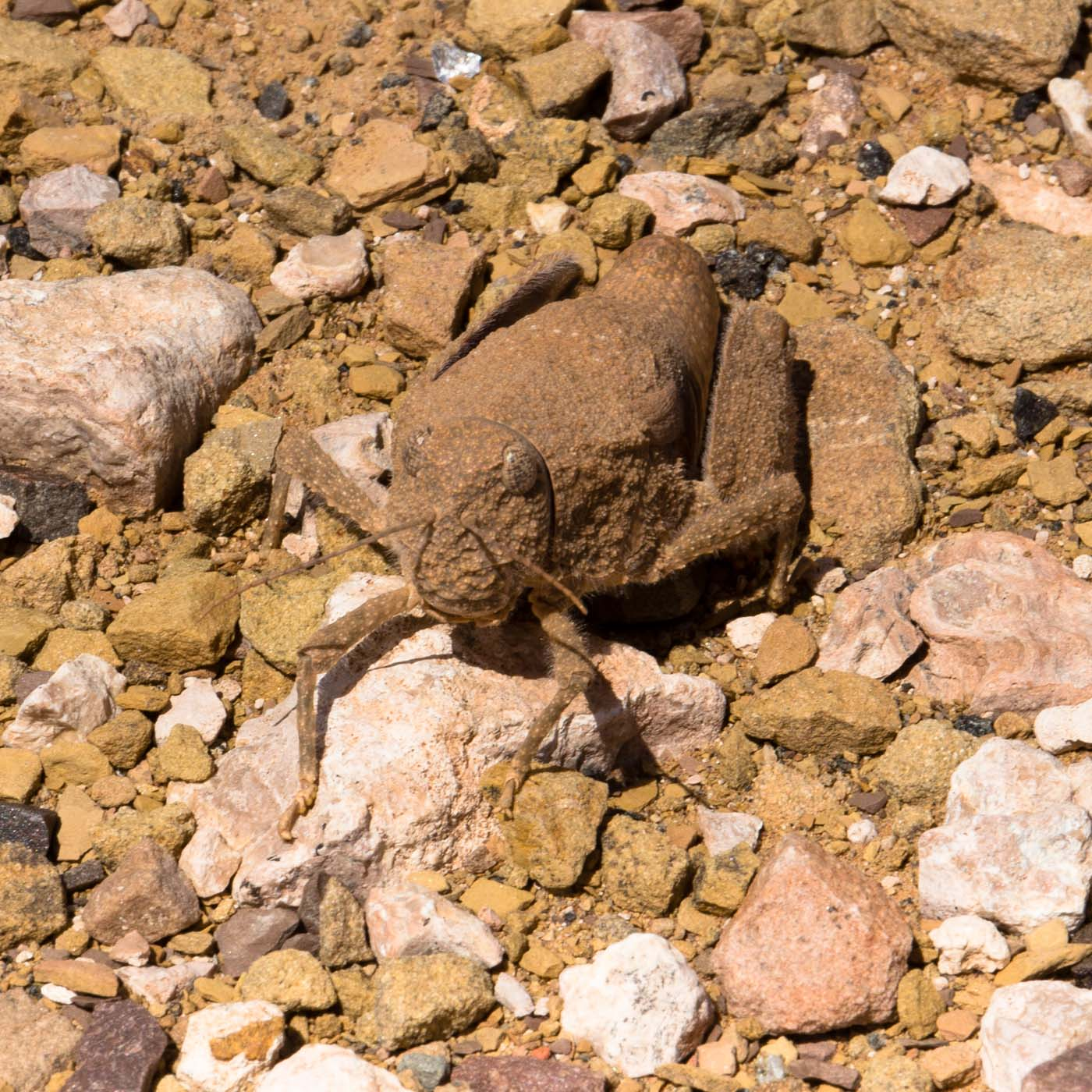

Scientific classification
- Domain: Eukaryota
- Kingdom: Animalia
- Phylum: Arthropoda
- Class: Insecta
- Order: Orthoptera
- Suborder: Caelifera
- Family: Pamphagidae
- Subfamily: Porthetinae
- Tribe: Trachypetrellini
- Genus: Trachypetrella; Kirby, 1910
- Species: T. anderssonii

Binomial name
- Trachypetrella anderssonii (Stål, 1875)

= Trachypetrella =

Genus of grasshoppers

Trachypetrella is a genus of grasshoppers in the family Pamphagidae. There is one described species in Trachypetrella, T. anderssonii, found in southern Africa.
