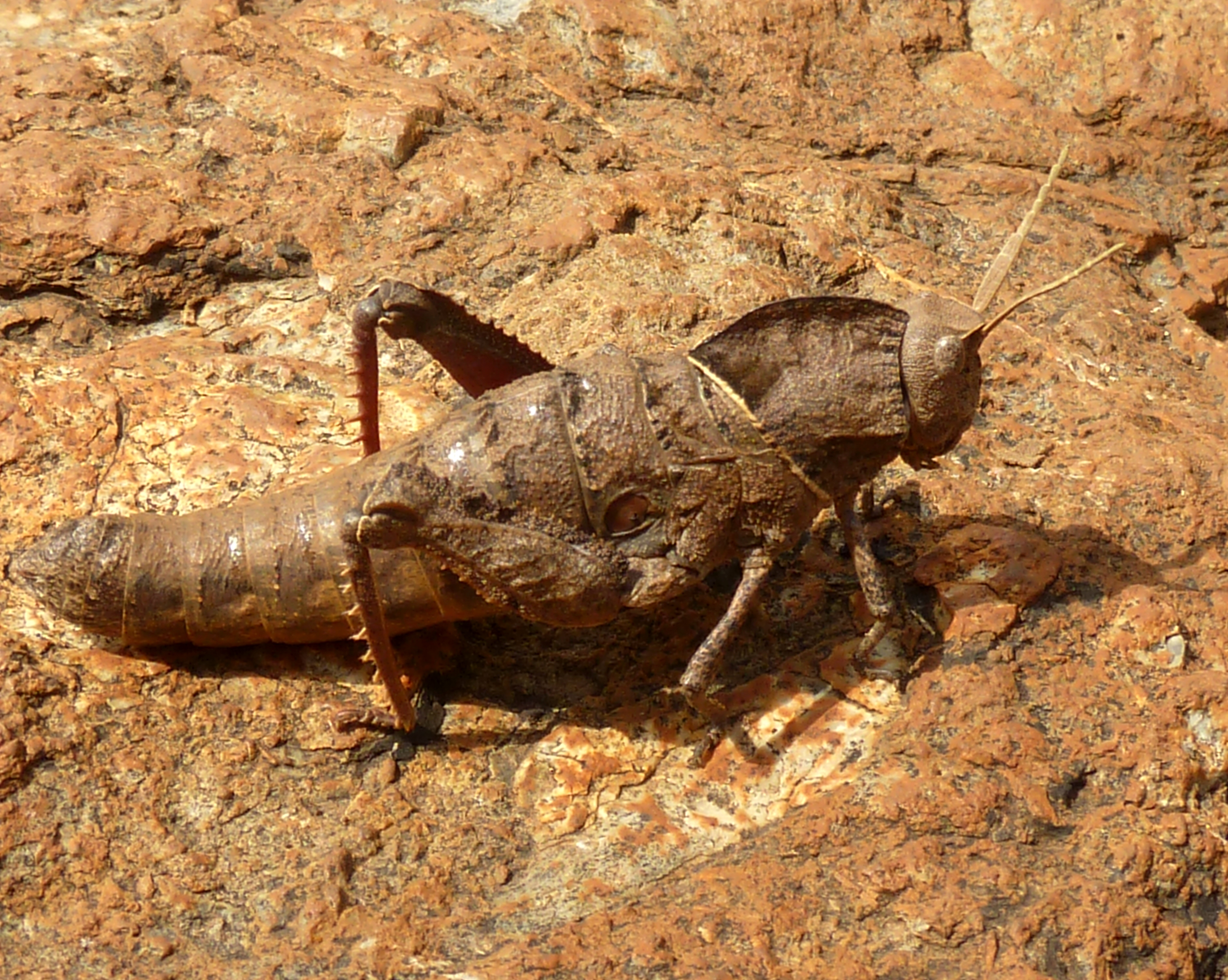
- Lobosceliana, South Africa

Scientific classification
- Domain: Eukaryota
- Kingdom: Animalia
- Phylum: Arthropoda
- Class: Insecta
- Order: Orthoptera
- Suborder: Caelifera
- Family: Pamphagidae
- Subfamily: Porthetinae
- Genus: Lobosceliana; Dirsh, 1958

= Lobosceliana =

Genus of grasshoppers

Lobosceliana is a genus of grasshoppers in the family Pamphagidae. There are about nine described species in Lobosceliana, found in southern Africa.

== Species ==
These nine species belong to the genus Lobosceliana:

- Lobosceliana brachyptera Hemp, 2013
- Lobosceliana brevicornis (Bolívar, 1915)
- Lobosceliana cinerascens (Stål, 1873)
- Lobosceliana femoralis (Walker, 1870)
- Lobosceliana gilgilensis (Bolívar, 1915)
- Lobosceliana haploscelis (Schaum, 1853)
- Lobosceliana loboscelis (Schaum, 1853)
- Lobosceliana rugosipes (Kirby, 1902)
- Lobosceliana spectrum (Saussure, 1887)
