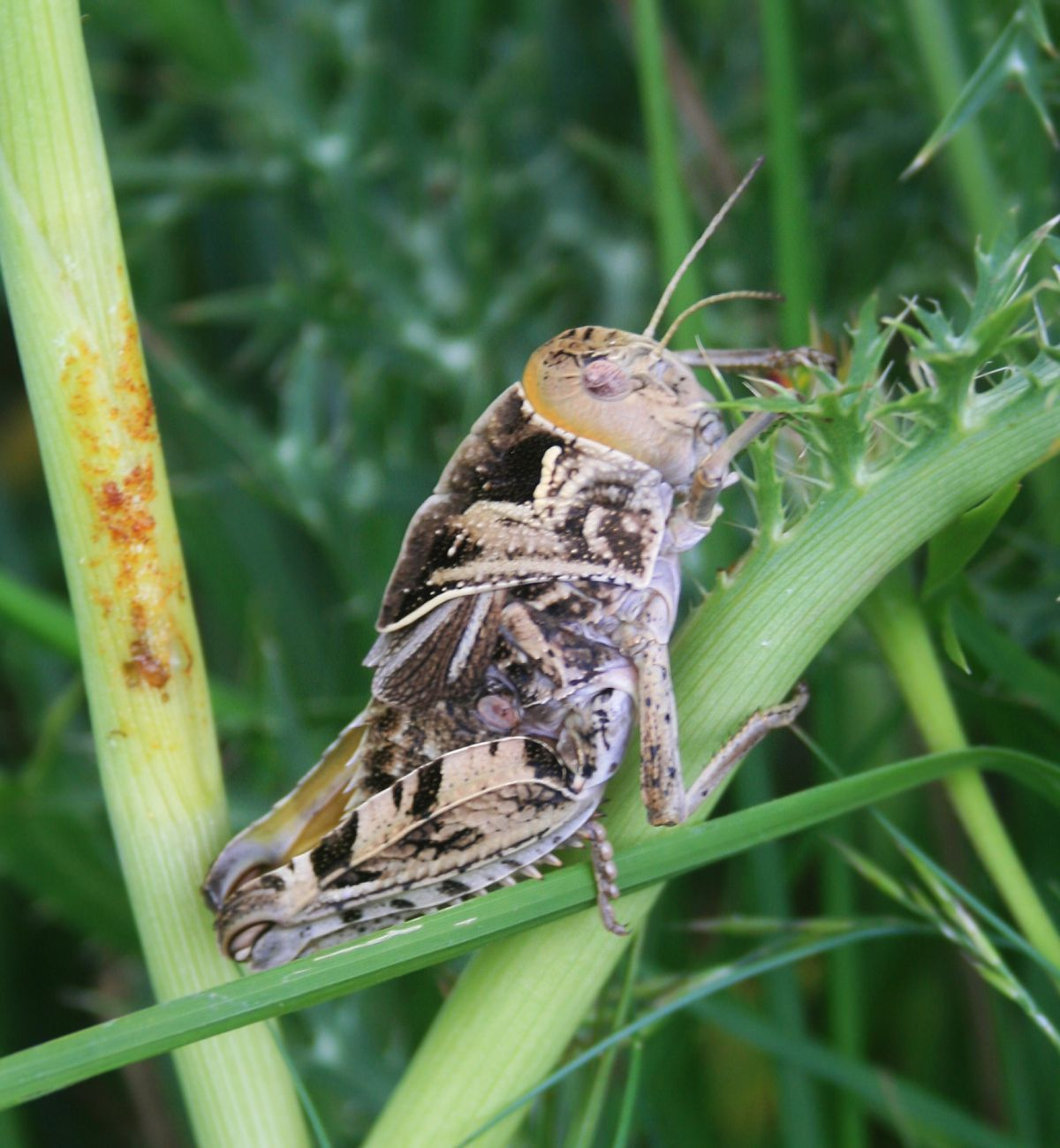
- Prionotropis hystrix

Scientific classification
- Domain: Eukaryota
- Kingdom: Animalia
- Phylum: Arthropoda
- Class: Insecta
- Order: Orthoptera
- Suborder: Caelifera
- Family: Pamphagidae
- Subfamily: Thrinchinae; Stål, 1876

Synonyms
- Eremobidae Saussure, 1884; Eremobiidae Saussure, 1884; Eremobiites Saussure, 1884; Prionotropisinae Zhang, Yin & Yin, 2003; Trinchidae Stål, 1880; Trinchinae Stål, 1876; Trinchini Stål, 1876; Eremobiini Saussure, 1884; Trincidae Stål, 1876

= Thrinchinae =

Subfamily of grasshoppers found in Africa, Europe and Asia

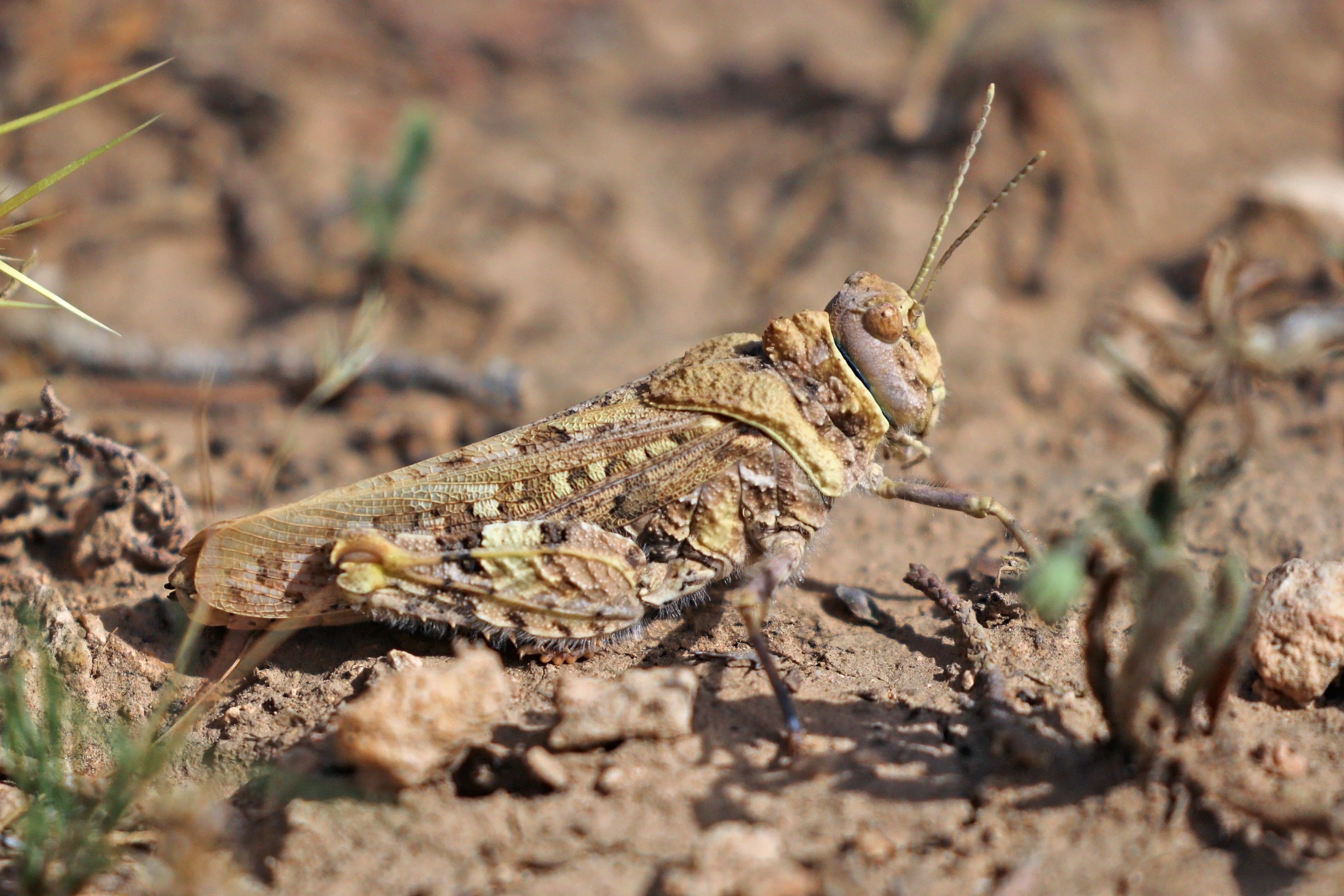
Tmethis pulchripennis, Jordan

Thrinchinae is a subfamily of grasshoppers, with genus found in Africa, Europe and Asia.

== Tribes and Genera ==
The Orthoptera Species File currently (2024) includes three tribes:

Finotiini Bolívar, 1916

1. Finotia Bonnet, 1884 - North Africa

=== Haplotropidini ===
Authority: Sergeev, 1995; distribution: NE Asia

1. Haplotropis Saussure, 1888
2. Humphaplotropis Xiao, Yin & Yin, 2013
3. Sinohaplotropis Cao & Yin, 2008
4. Sulcohumpacris Yin, Yin & Cao, 2017

=== Thrinchini ===
Authority: Stål, 1876; distribution: Africa, mainland Europe, central Asia through to Japan

1. Asiotmethis Uvarov, 1943
2. Atrichotmethis Uvarov, 1943
3. Beybienkia Tsyplenkov, 1956
4. Dhofaria Popov, 1985
5. Eoeotmethis Zheng, 1985
6. Eotmethis Bey-Bienko, 1948
7. Eremocharis Saussure, 1884
8. Eremopeza Saussure, 1888
9. Eremotmethis Uvarov, 1943
10. Filchnerella Karny, 1908
11. Glyphanus Fieber, 1853
12. Glyphotmethis Bey-Bienko, 1951
13. Iranotmethis Uvarov, 1943
14. Melanotmethis Uvarov, 1943
15. Mongolotmethis Bey-Bienko, 1948
16. Pezotmethis Uvarov, 1943
17. Prionotropis Fieber, 1853
18. Rhinotmethis Sjöstedt, 1933
19. Strumiger Zubovski, 1896
20. Thrinchus Fischer von Waldheim, 1833
21. Tmethis Fieber, 1853
22. Tuarega Uvarov, 1943
23. Utubius Uvarov, 1936
