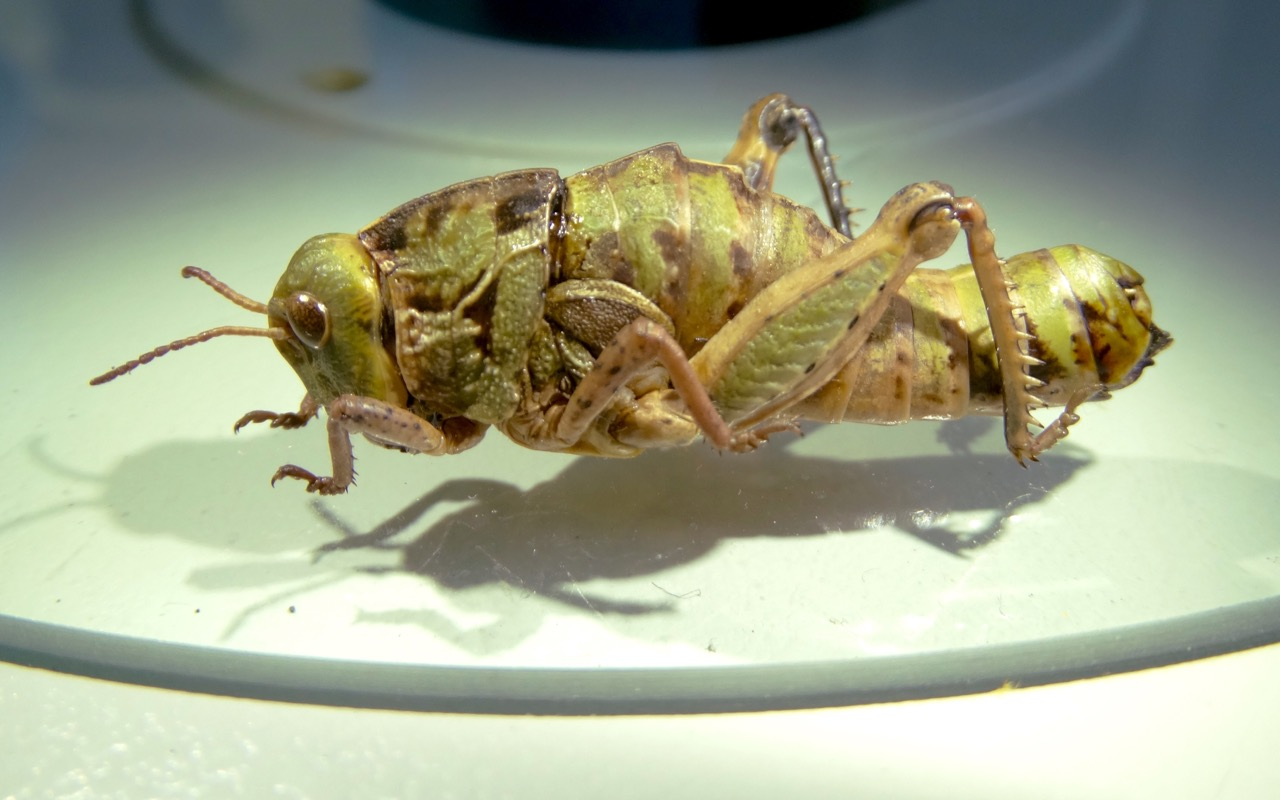
- Euryparyphes flexuosus

Scientific classification
- Domain: Eukaryota
- Kingdom: Animalia
- Phylum: Arthropoda
- Class: Insecta
- Order: Orthoptera
- Suborder: Caelifera
- Family: Pamphagidae
- Tribe: Euryparyphini
- Genus: Euryparyphes; Fischer, 1853

Synonyms
- Eunapius Stål, 1876

= Euryparyphes =

Genus of grasshoppers

Euryparyphes is a genus of grasshoppers in the family Pamphagidae. Euryparyphes is the type species of its tribe and species have been recorded from southern Europe and North Africa.

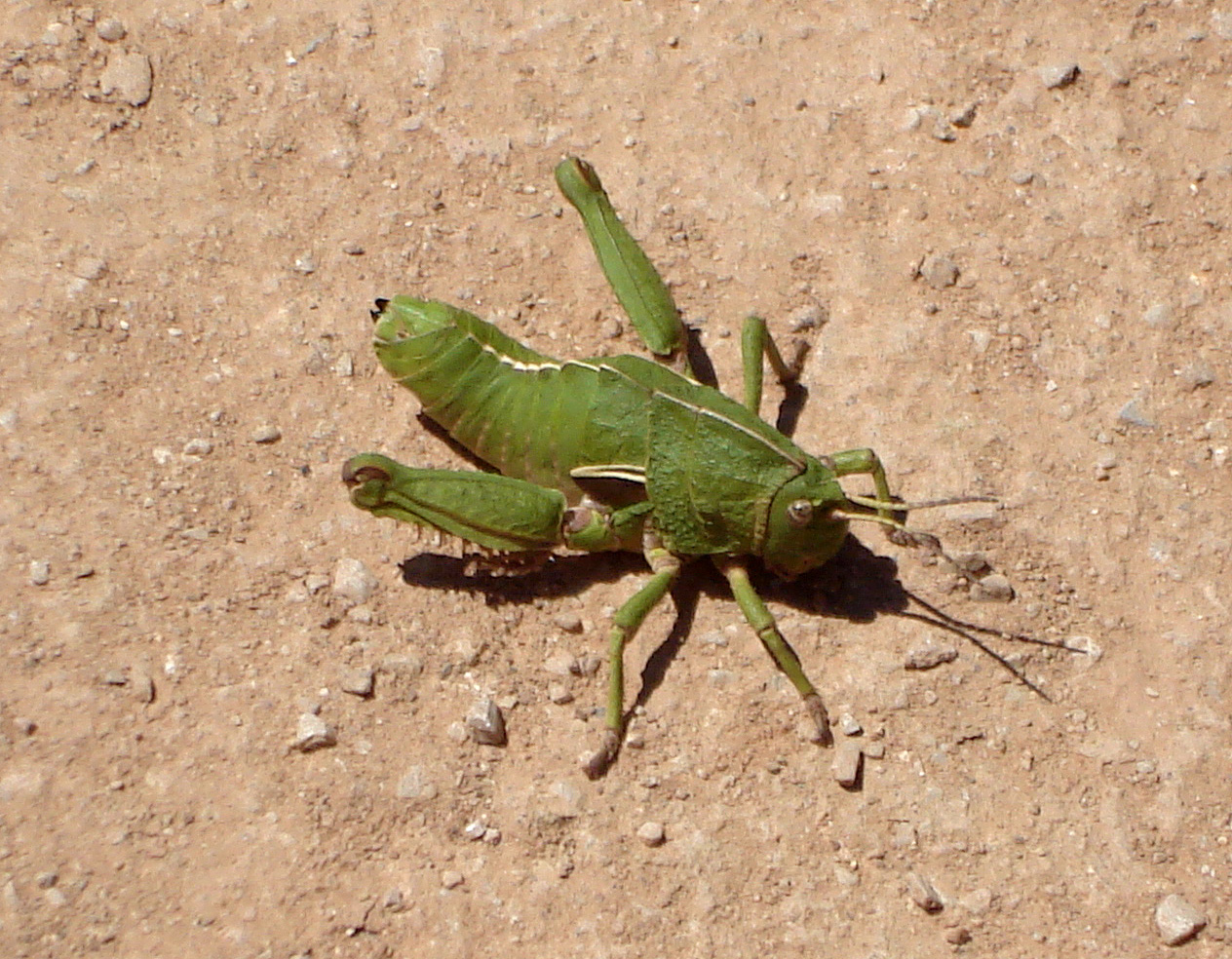
Euryparyphes terrulentus

== Species ==
The Orthoptera Species File lists:

1. Euryparyphes atlasicus La Greca, 1993
2. Euryparyphes bolivarii (Stål, 1876)
3. Euryparyphes breviphallus La Greca, 1993
4. Euryparyphes cinerascens La Greca, 1993
5. Euryparyphes defauti La Greca, 1993
6. Euryparyphes flexuosus Uvarov, 1927
7. Euryparyphes gharbensis Defaut, 1987
8. Euryparyphes laetus (Bolívar, 1907)
9. Euryparyphes mamorensis Defaut, 1987
10. Euryparyphes maroccanus (Saussure, 1887)
11. Euryparyphes minor Chobanov & Massa, 2022
12. Euryparyphes nigripes La Greca, 1993
13. Euryparyphes paraflexuosus La Greca, 1993
14. Euryparyphes pictipes Uvarov, 1927
15. Euryparyphes rungsi Massa, 2013
16. Euryparyphes sitifensis (Brisout de Barneville, 1854)
17. Euryparyphes tazzekensis La Greca, 1993
18. Euryparyphes terrulentus (Serville, 1838) - type species (as Porthetis terrulenta Serville)
