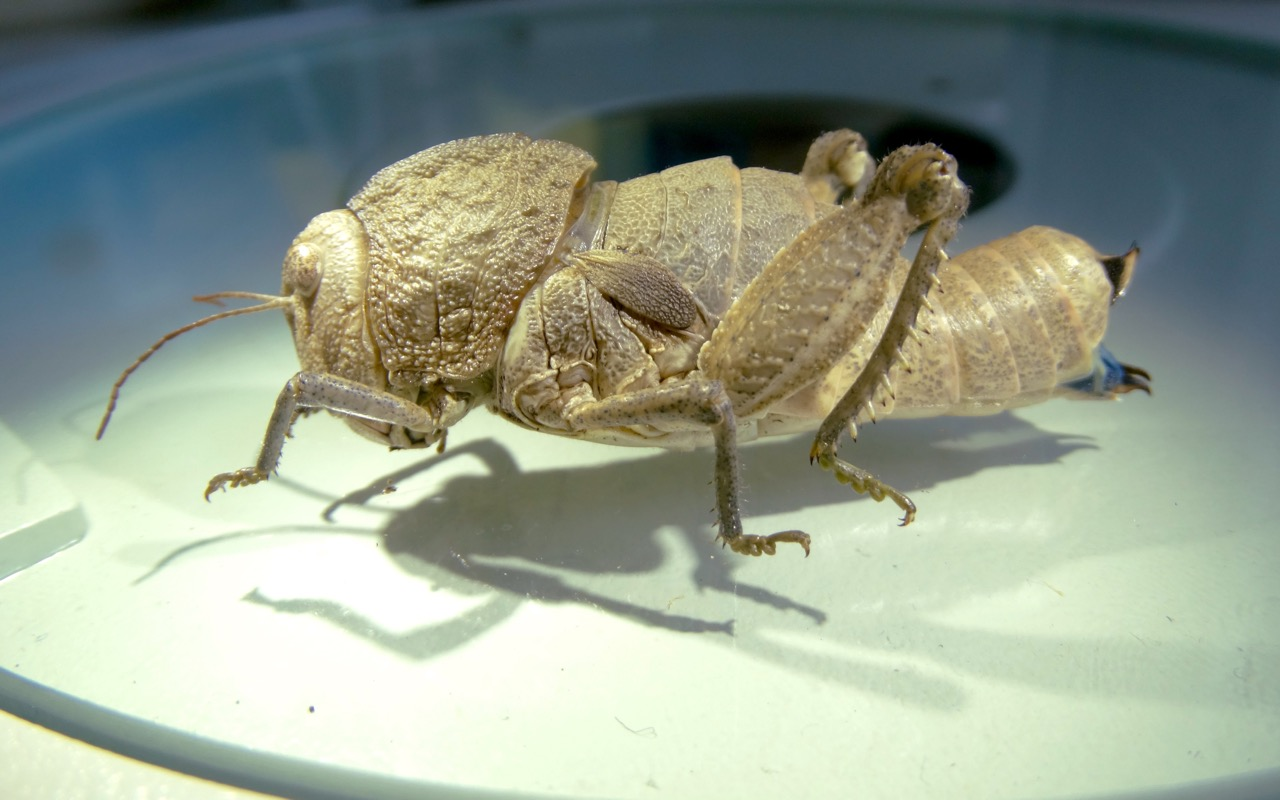
- Eunapiodes granosus

Scientific classification
- Kingdom: Animalia
- Phylum: Arthropoda
- Class: Insecta
- Order: Orthoptera
- Suborder: Caelifera
- Family: Pamphagidae
- Tribe: Euryparyphini
- Genus: Eunapiodes; Bolívar, 1907

= Eunapiodes =

Genus of grasshoppers

Eunapiodes is a genus of grasshoppers in the family Pamphagidae. There are at least four described species in Eunapiodes, found in North Africa.

== Species ==
These four species belong to the genus Eunapiodes:

- Eunapiodes atlantis (Chopard, 1943)
- Eunapiodes granosus (Stål, 1876)
- Eunapiodes ifranensis (Werner, 1932)
- Eunapiodes latipes Bolívar, 1912
