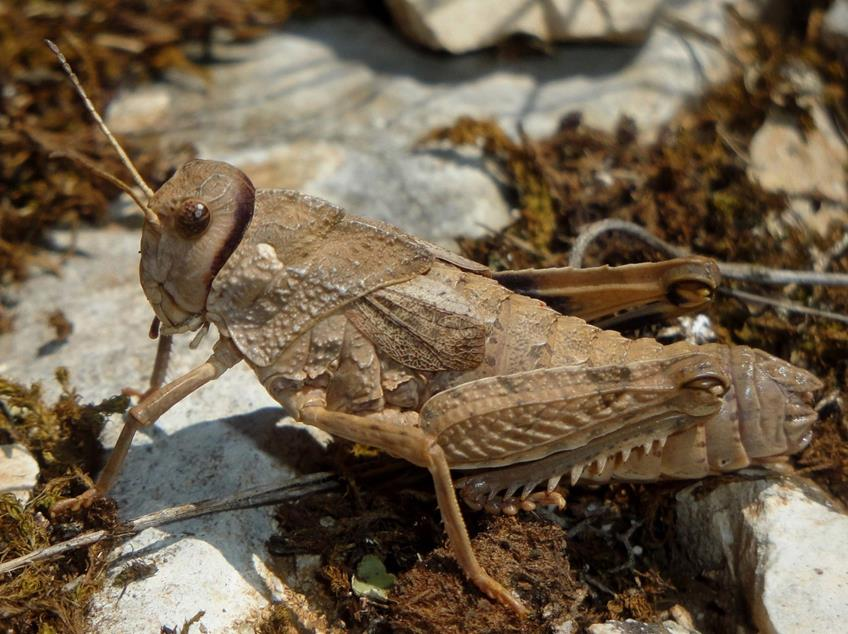
- Prionotropis ancosae

Scientific classification
- Domain: Eukaryota
- Kingdom: Animalia
- Phylum: Arthropoda
- Class: Insecta
- Order: Orthoptera
- Suborder: Caelifera
- Family: Pamphagidae
- Tribe: Thrinchini
- Genus: Prionotropis; Fieber, 1853

Synonyms
- Cuculligera Fischer, 1853; Prionotopis Voisin, 2003

= Prionotropis =

Genus of grasshoppers

Prionotropis is a genus of grasshoppers in the family Pamphagidae. Most described species of Prionotropis are found in southern Europe.

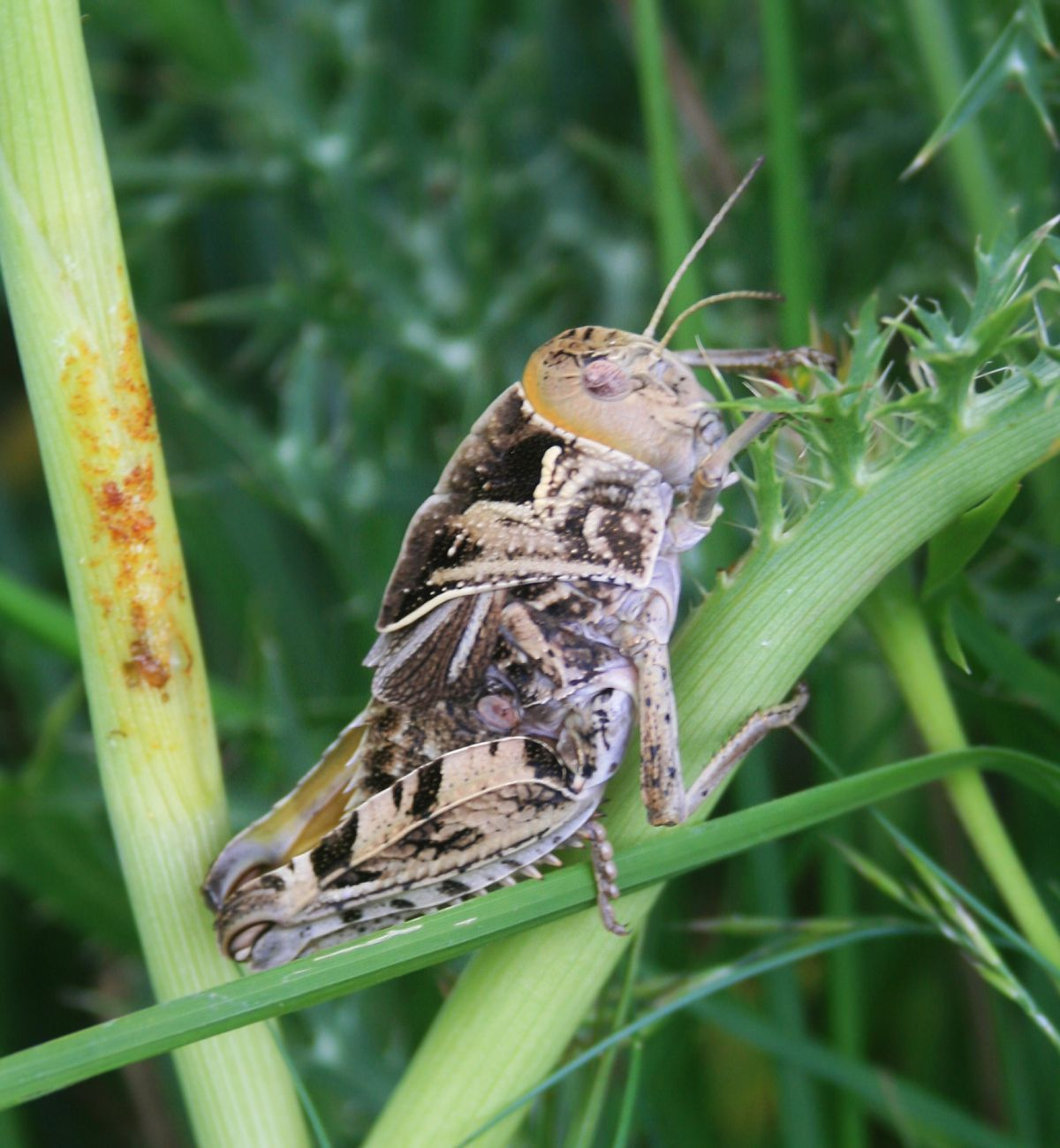
Prionotropis hystrix

== Species ==
The Orthoptera Species File includes:

1. Prionotropis ancosae Olmo-Vidal, 2017
2. Prionotropis appula (Costa, 1836)
3. Prionotropis azami Uvarov, 1923
4. Prionotropis flexuosa (Serville, 1838)
5. Prionotropis hystrix (Germar, 1817) - type species (as Gryllus hystrix Germar)
6. Prionotropis maculinervis (Stål, 1876)
7. Prionotropis rhodanica Uvarov, 1923
8. Prionotropis willemsorum Massa & Ünal, 2015
9. Prionotropis xausi Olmo-Vidal, 2020
