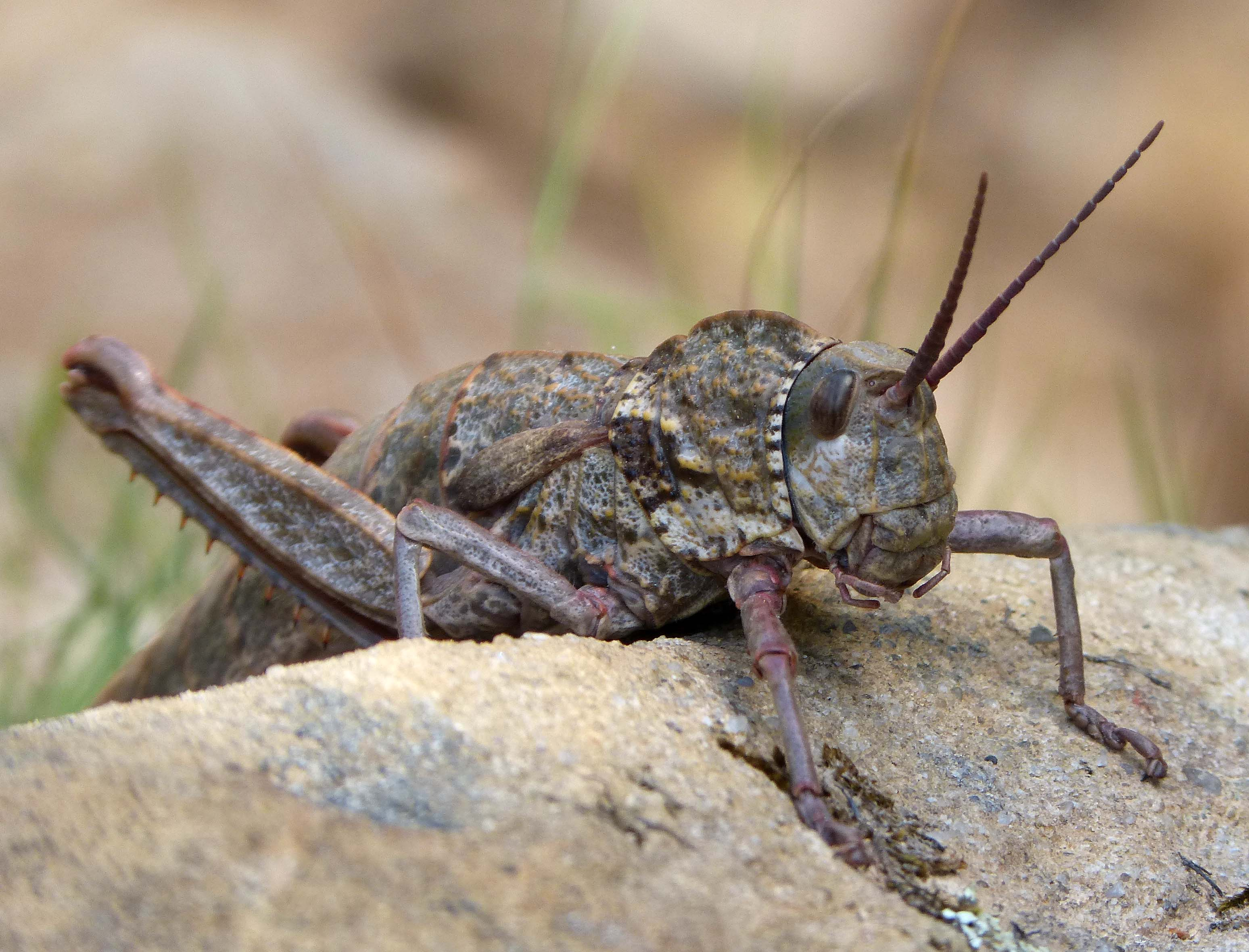
- Acinipe hesperica

Scientific classification
- Kingdom: Animalia
- Phylum: Arthropoda
- Class: Insecta
- Order: Orthoptera
- Suborder: Caelifera
- Family: Pamphagidae
- Subfamily: Pamphaginae
- Tribe: Pamphagini
- Genus: Acinipe; Rambur, 1838

= Acinipe =

Genus of grasshoppers

Acinipe is a genus of grasshoppers in the family Pamphagidae. Species of Acinipe are found in Southern Europe and North Africa.

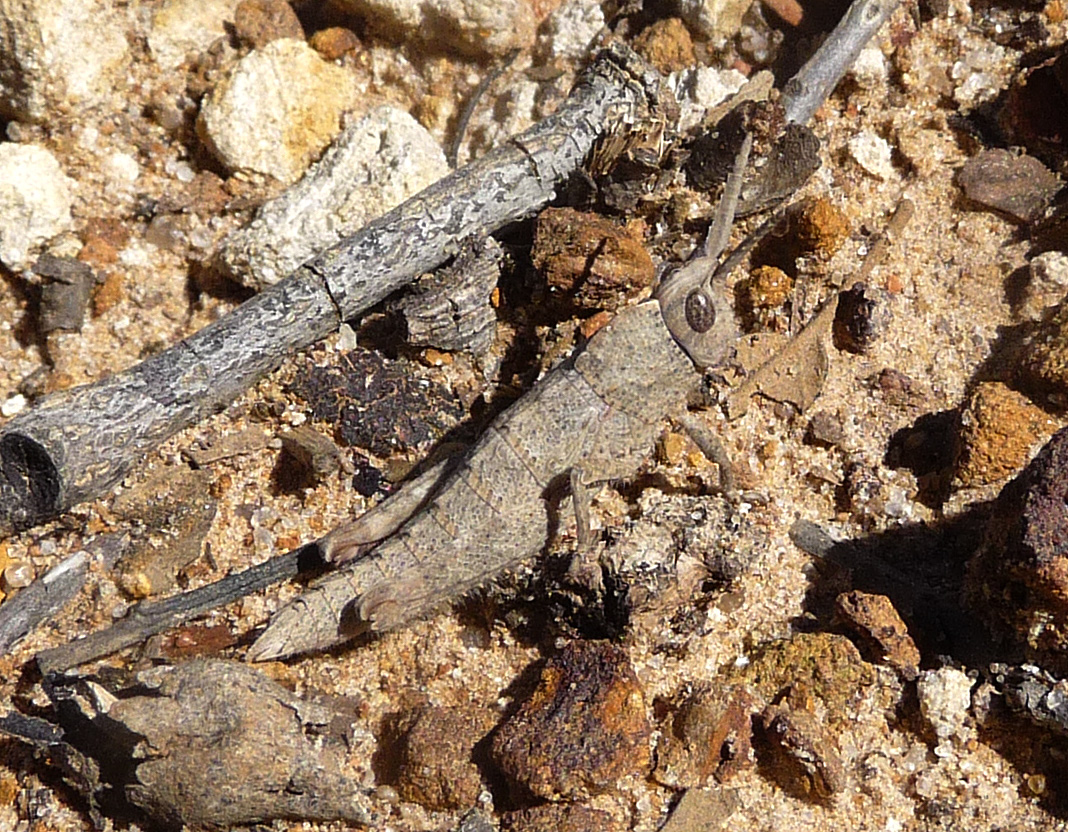
Acinipe tibialis

== Species ==
The Orthoptera Species File includes:

1. Acinipe algerica (Brunner von Wattenwyl, 1882)
2. Acinipe algeriensis Descamps & Mounassif, 1972
3. Acinipe angustipennis Chopard, 1943
4. Acinipe arthemisiae Descamps & Mounassif, 1972
5. Acinipe atlantis Descamps & Mounassif, 1972
6. Acinipe bicoloripes Descamps & Mounassif, 1972
7. Acinipe calabra (Costa, 1836)
8. Acinipe comptei Llorente del Moral, 1980
9. Acinipe deceptoria (Bolívar, 1878)
10. Acinipe dissipata Descamps & Mounassif, 1972
11. Acinipe eulaliae Olmo-Vidal, 2009
12. Acinipe expansa (Brunner von Wattenwyl, 1882)
13. Acinipe galvagnii Cusimano & Massa, 1977
14. Acinipe hesperica Rambur, 1838
15. Acinipe hispanica Llorente del Moral & Presa, 1983
16. Acinipe ignatii Llorente del Moral & Presa, 1983
17. Acinipe mabillei (Bolívar, 1878)
18. Acinipe minima Werner, 1931
19. Acinipe muelleri (Krauss, 1893)
20. Acinipe nadigi Descamps & Mounassif, 1972
21. Acinipe paulinoi (Bolívar, 1887)
22. Acinipe perisi Llorente del Moral & Presa, 1983
23. Acinipe rifensis Descamps & Mounassif, 1972
24. Acinipe rungsi Descamps & Mounassif, 1972
25. Acinipe segurensis (Bolívar, 1908)
26. Acinipe strigata Roberts, 1938
27. Acinipe tibialis (Fieber, 1853)
28. Acinipe tubericollis Werner, 1932
