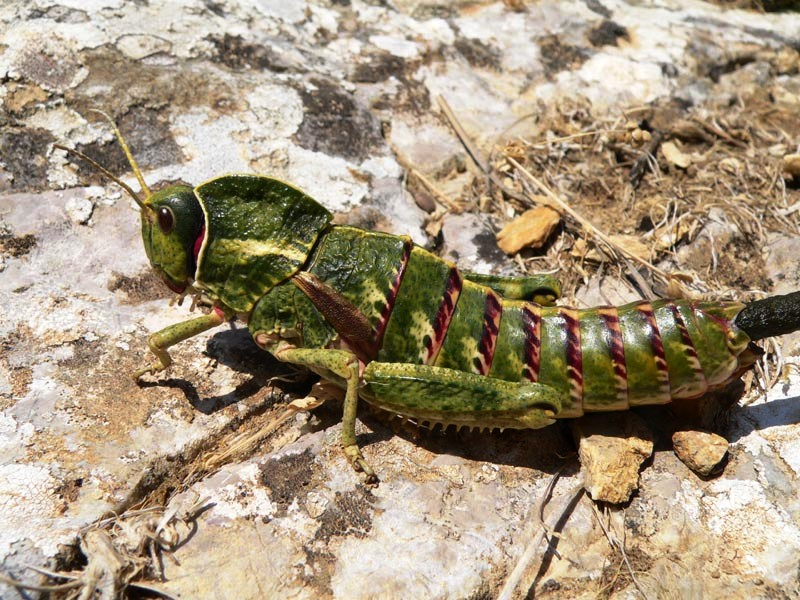
- Pamphagus marmoratus

Scientific classification
- Domain: Eukaryota
- Kingdom: Animalia
- Phylum: Arthropoda
- Class: Insecta
- Order: Orthoptera
- Suborder: Caelifera
- Family: Pamphagidae
- Tribe: Pamphagini
- Genus: Pamphagus; Thunberg, 1815

= Pamphagus =

Genus of grasshoppers

Pamphagus is a genus of grasshoppers in the family Pamphagidae. There are about 12 described species in Pamphagus, found in southern Europe and northern Africa.

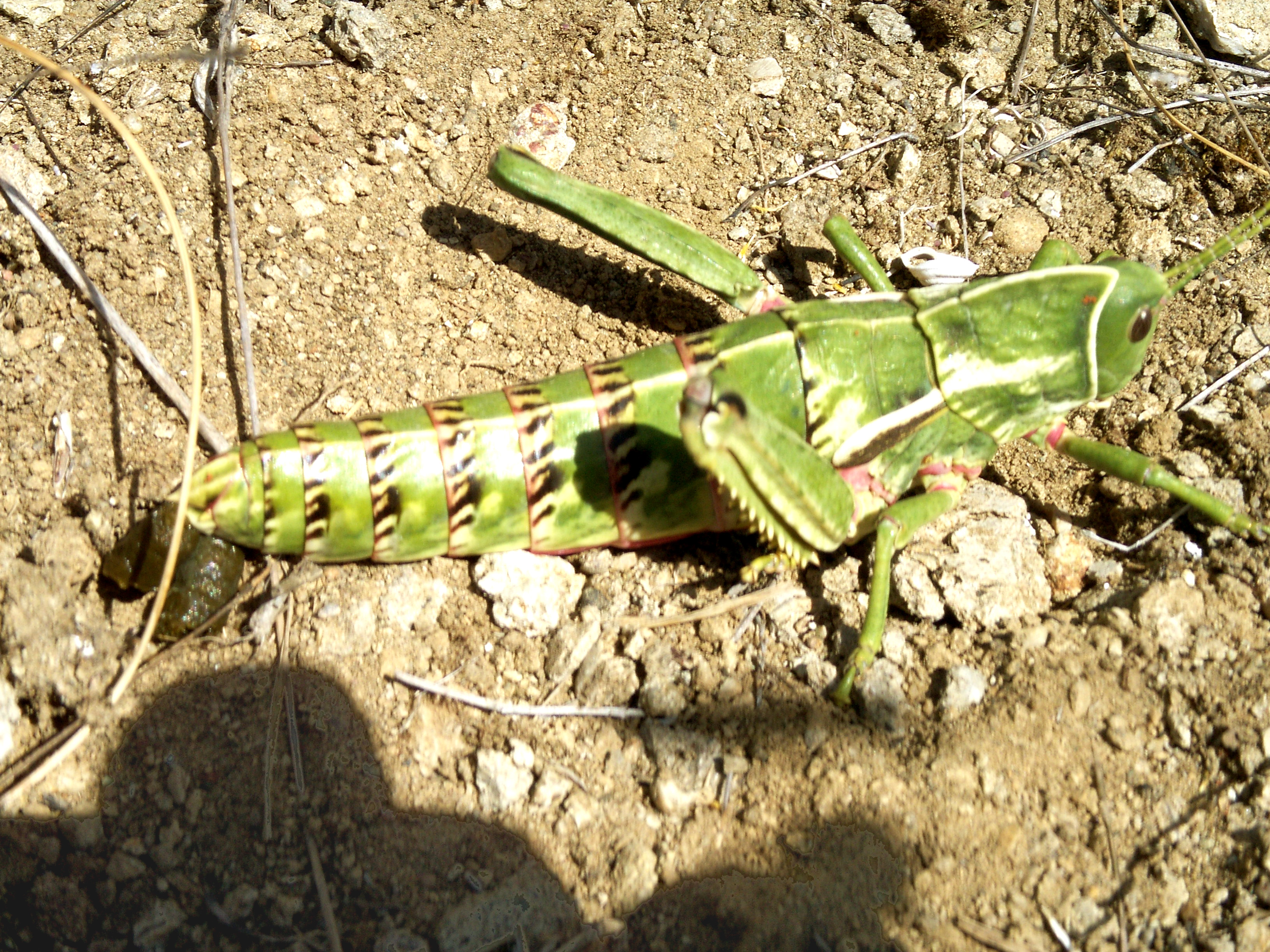
Pamphagus sardeus

== Species ==
The Orthoptera species file includes:

1. Pamphagus auresianus Massa, 1992
2. Pamphagus batnensis Benkenana & Petit, 2012
3. Pamphagus caprai Massa, 1992
4. Pamphagus cristatus Descamps & Mounassif, 1972
5. Pamphagus djelfensis Vosseler, 1902
6. Pamphagus elephas (Linnaeus, 1758) - type species (as Gryllus elephas L. by subsequent designation)
7. Pamphagus marmoratus Burmeister, 1838
8. Pamphagus meridionalis Descamps & Mounassif, 1972
9. Pamphagus milevitanus Benkenana & Massa, 2017
10. Pamphagus ortolaniae Cusimano & Massa, 1977
11. Pamphagus sardeus (Herrich-Schäffer, 1840)
12. Pamphagus tunetanus Vosseler, 1902
