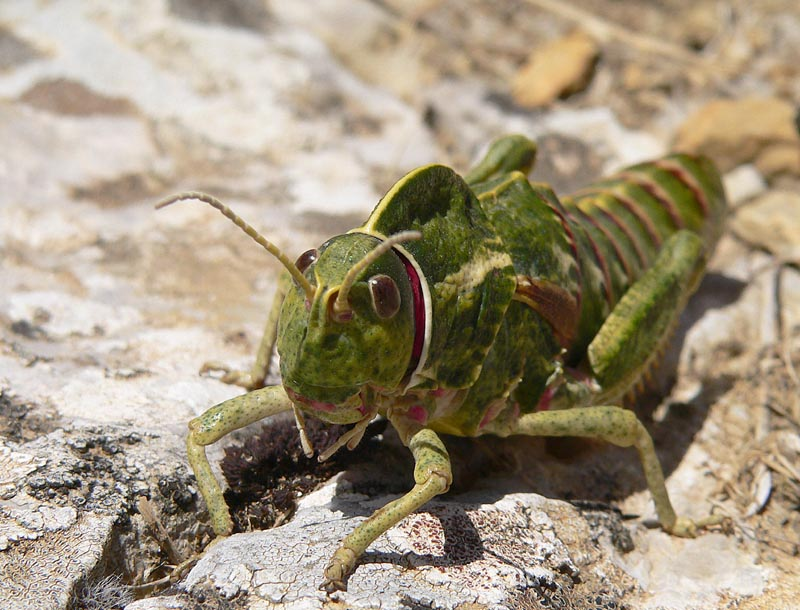
- Pamphagus marmoratus

Scientific classification
- Kingdom: Animalia
- Phylum: Arthropoda
- Clade: Pancrustacea
- Class: Insecta
- Order: Orthoptera
- Suborder: Caelifera
- Superfamily: Acridoidea
- Family: Pamphagidae; Burmeister, 1840

Synonyms
- Pamphagoidea Burmeister, 1840

= Pamphagidae =

Family of grasshoppers

Pamphagidae or shieldback grasshoppers are a family of grasshoppers belonging to the superfamily Acridoidea. The species in this family can be found in Africa, Europe and Asia.

== Subfamilies, Tribes and selected Genera ==
The Orthoptera Species File lists the following:

=== Akicerinae ===
Auth.: Bolívar, 1916 – southern Africa; all genera:

tribe Akicerini Bolívar, 1916 (monotypic)

1. Akicera Serville, 1831

Incertae sedis

1. Adephagus Saussure, 1887
2. Batrachornis Saussure, 1884
3. Batrachotetrix Burmeister, 1838
4. Eremotettix Saussure, 1888

=== Echinotropinae ===
Auth.: Dirsh, 1961 – southern Africa; all genera:

1. Echinotropis Uvarov, 1944
2. Geloiomimus Saussure, 1899
3. Parageloiomimus Dirsh, 1961
4. Thrincotropis Saussure, 1899

=== Pamphaginae ===
Auth.: Burmeister, 1840 – northern Africa, Europe, W. Asia; selected genera:

tribe Euryparyphini La Greca, 1993

- Eunapiodes Bolívar, 1907
- Euryparyphes Fischer, 1853

tribe Finotiini Bolívar, 1916 (monotypic)

- Finotia Bonnet, 1884

tribe Nocarodeini Bolívar, 1916

- Nocarodes Fischer von Waldheim, 1846

tribe Pamphagini Burmeister, 1840

- Acinipe Rambur, 1838
- Pamphagus Thunberg, 1815
- Paracinipe Descamps & Mounassif, 1972

tribe Tropidauchenini Zhang, Yin & Yin, 2003

- Tropidauchen Saussure, 1887

Incertae sedis

- Acrostira Enderlein, 1929

=== Porthetinae ===
Auth.: Bolívar, 1916 – S. to E Africa, Middle East; selected genera:

tribe Trachypetrellini Uvarov, 1943 (monotypic)

1. Trachypetrella Kirby, 1910

Incertae sedis

- Lamarckiana Kirby, 1910
- Lobosceliana Dirsh, 1958
- Pagopedilum Karsch, 1896
- Xiphoceriana Dirsh, 1958

=== Thrinchinae ===
Auth.: Stål, 1876 – northern Africa, Europe, temperate Asia; selected genera:

tribe Haplotropidini Sergeev, 1995

- Haplotropis Saussure, 1888

tribe Thrinchini Stål, 1876

- Iranotmethis Uvarov, 1943
- Prionotropis Fieber, 1853
- Thrinchus Fischer von Waldheim, 1833
