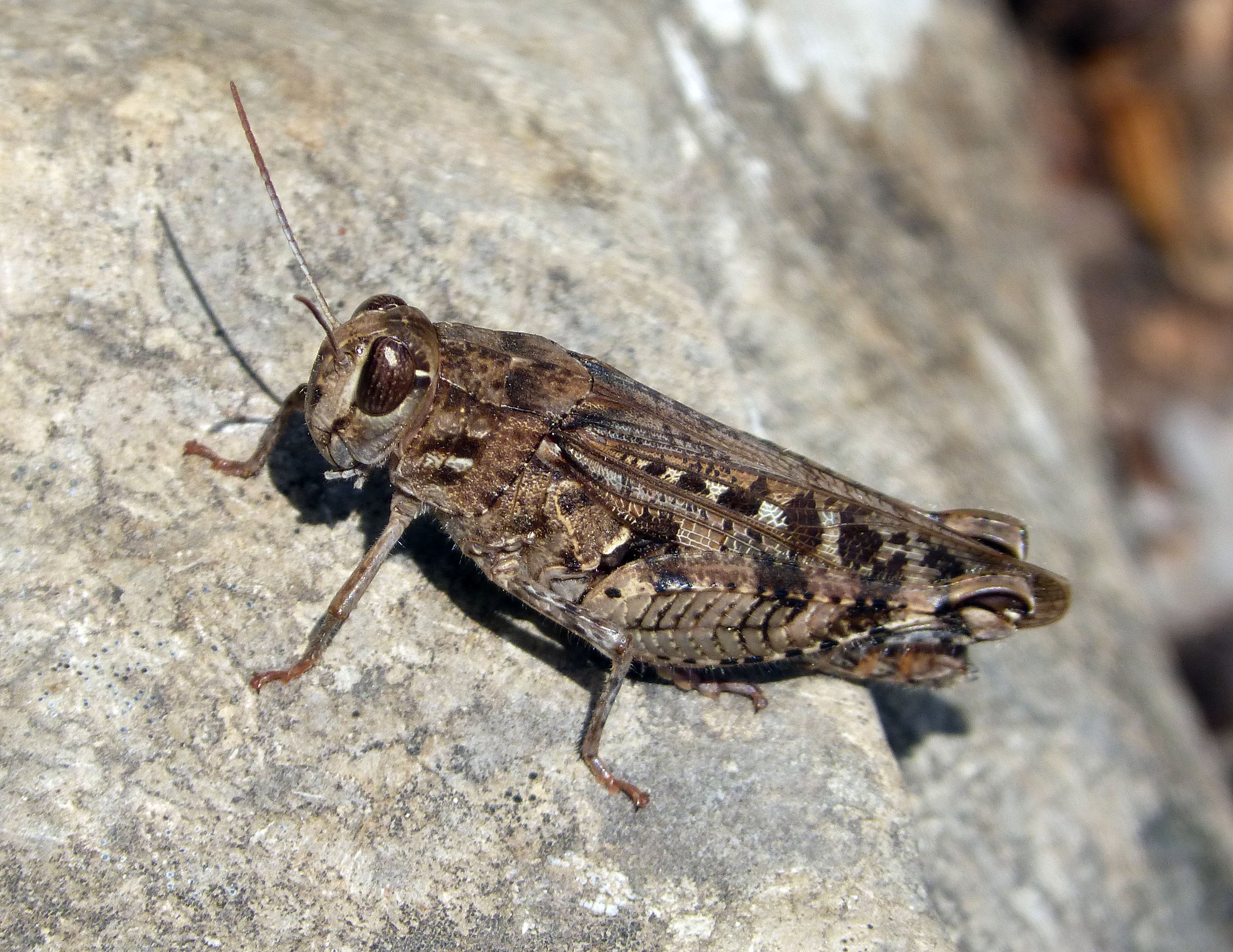

Scientific classification
- Kingdom: Animalia
- Phylum: Arthropoda
- Clade: Pancrustacea
- Class: Insecta
- Order: Orthoptera
- Suborder: Caelifera
- Family: Acrididae
- Subfamily: Calliptaminae
- Genus: Calliptamus
- Species: C. barbarus

Binomial name
- Calliptamus barbarus (Costa, 1836)

= Calliptamus barbarus =

Species of grasshopper

Close-Up of a Calliptamus barbarus

Calliptamus barbarus is a species of short-horned grasshopper in the family Acrididae. It is found in the Palearctic.

== Subspecies ==
These subspecies belong to the species Calliptamus barbarus:

- Calliptamus barbarus barbarus (Costa, 1836)
- Calliptamus barbarus cephalotes Fischer von Waldheim, 1846
- Calliptamus barbarus palaestinensis Ramme, 1930
- Calliptamus barbarus pallidipes Chopard, 1943
