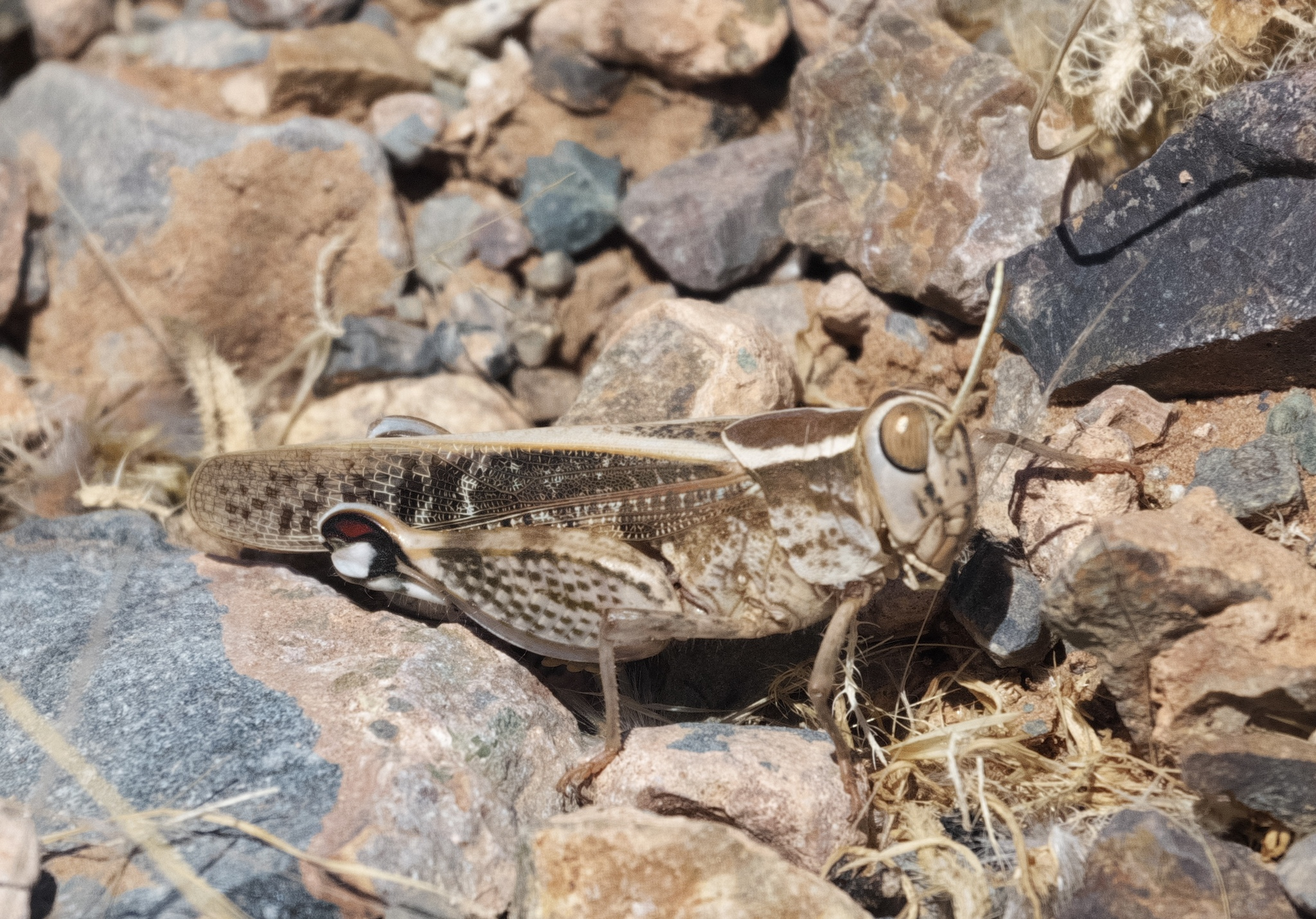
- Acorypha pallidicornis, Namibia

Scientific classification
- Kingdom: Animalia
- Phylum: Arthropoda
- Clade: Pancrustacea
- Class: Insecta
- Order: Orthoptera
- Suborder: Caelifera
- Family: Acrididae
- Subfamily: Calliptaminae
- Genus: Acorypha
- Species: A. pallidicornis

Binomial name
- Acorypha pallidicornis (Stål, 1876)

Synonyms
- Calliptenus pallidicornis Stål, 1876

= Acorypha pallidicornis =

Species of grasshoppers

Acorypha pallidicornis is a species of short-horned grasshopper in the family Acrididae. It is found in southern Africa.

== Subspecies ==
These two subspecies belong to the species Acorypha pallidicornis:

- Acorypha pallidicornis ajuran (Kevan, 1967)
- Acorypha pallidicornis pallidicornis (Stål, 1876)
