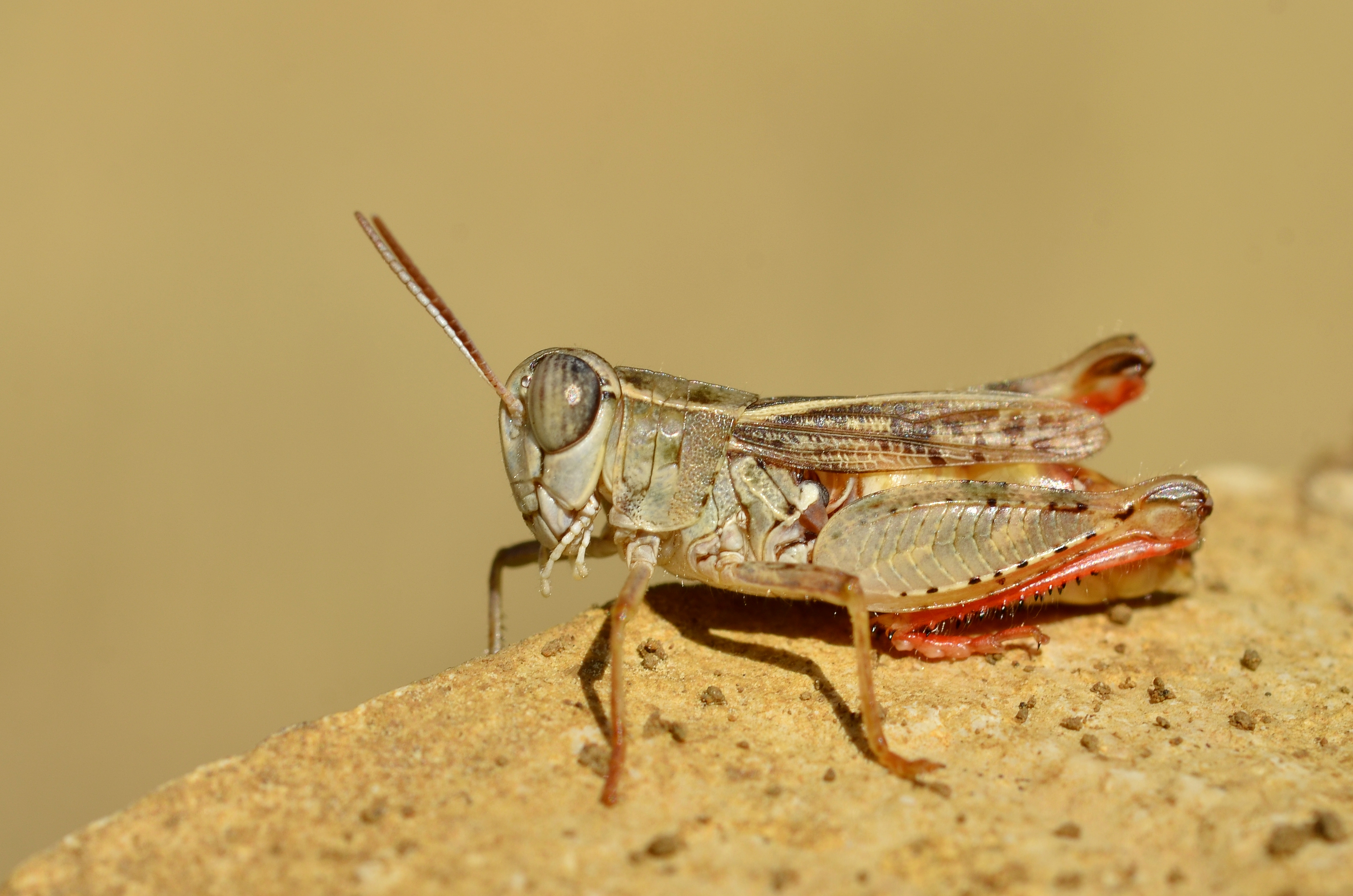
- Calliptamus siciliae. Male
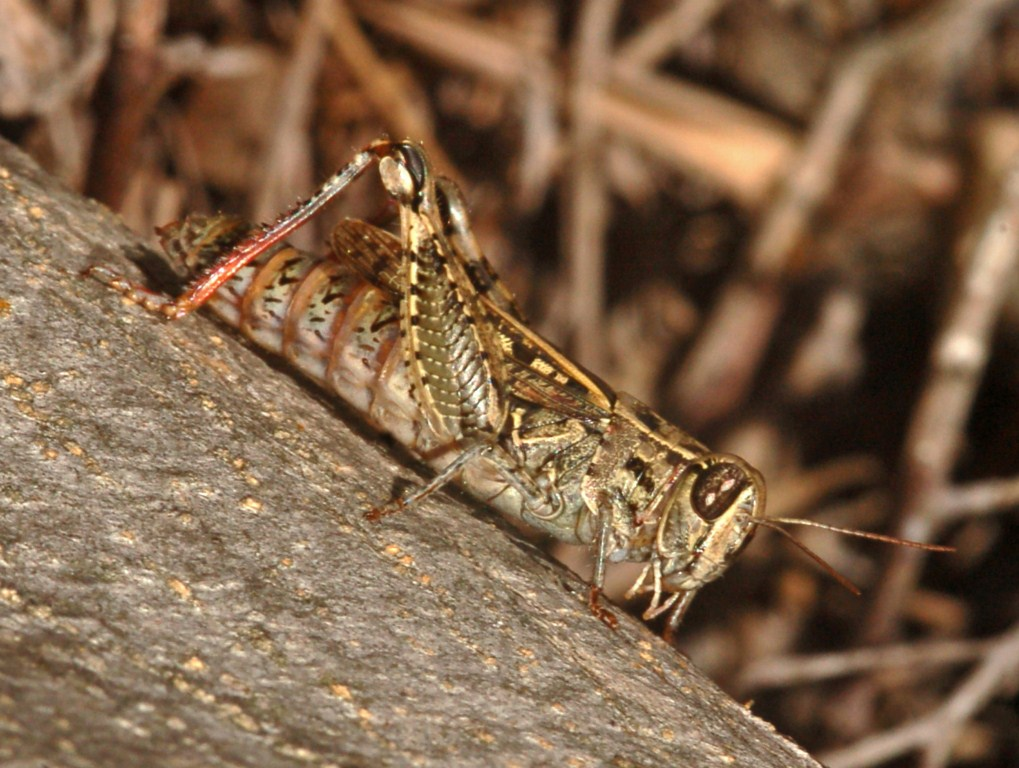
- Female

Scientific classification
- Kingdom: Animalia
- Phylum: Arthropoda
- Clade: Pancrustacea
- Class: Insecta
- Order: Orthoptera
- Suborder: Caelifera
- Family: Acrididae
- Genus: Calliptamus
- Species: C. siciliae

Binomial name
- Calliptamus siciliae Ramme, 1927

Synonyms
- Calliptenus abbreviatus siciliae Ramme, 1927; Calliptenus subalpinus Jago, 1963

= Calliptamus siciliae =

Species of grasshopper

Close-Up of a Calliptamus siciliae

Calliptamus siciliae, commonly known as the pygmy pincer grasshopper, is a species of short-horned grasshoppers belonging to the family Acrididae subfamily Calliptaminae.

== Distribution ==
This endemism is only present in the south-east of France, in Switzerland, in mainland Italy and in Sicily (hence the Latin name siciliae).

== Habitat ==
This species inhabits dry meadows, shrubland and arid environments, but also mountainous areas along stony paths, at an elevation of 220–1,420 metres (720–4,660 ft) above sea level. It prefers dense vegetation.

== Description ==
Calliptamus siciliae can reach a body length of 12–17 millimetres (0.47–0.67 in) in males, of 19–27 millimetres (0.75–1.06 in) in females. The basic coloration of the body is rather variable. It ranges from dark gray, greyish brown to reddish brown. The wings are narrow and dark spotted. The hind wings are transparent milky. The tibiae of the hindlegs and the underside of the femurs are reddish. It can be distinguished from similar species by the front wings (tegmina) shorter than the abdomen.

== Biology ==
Adults can mainly be encountered from July through October.

== Bibliography ==
- Baccetti [Ed.] (1987), Evolutionary Biology of Orthopteroid Insects (Ellis Horwood series in entomology and acarology), Ellis Horwood Ltd., Chichester, England 612 pp.
- Fontana, Buzzetti, Cogo & Odé (2002), Guida al riconoscimento e allo studio di cavallette, grilli, mantidi e insetti affini del Veneto: Blattaria, Mantodea, Isoptera, Orthoptera, Phasmatodea, Dermaptera, Embidiina, Museo Naturalistico Archaeologico di Vicenza, Vicenza 1-592
- Harz (1975) Die Orthopteren Europas II, Series Entomologica (Ser. Entomol.) 11:1-939, 3519 figs.
- Herrera (1982) Catalogue of the Orthoptera of Spain, Series Entomologica (Ser. Entomol.) 22:1-162
- Jago (1963) A revision of the genus Calliptamus Serville (Orthoptera: Acrididae), Bulletin of the British Museum (Natural History) Entomology (Bull. Br. Mus. (Nat. Hist.) Ent.) 13(9):289-350
- La Greca, Di Marco, Laurenzi & Osella In Osella, Biondi, Di Marco & Riti [Ed.] (1997) 9. Blattaria, Mantodea, Phasmodea, Orthoptera, Dermaptera (Insecta) [in Italian], Ricerche sulla Valle Peligna (Italia Centrale, Abruzzo) [Researches in the Peligna Valley (Central Italy, Abruzzo)], Amministrazione Provinciale, L'Aquila 1:155-173
- Llorente del Moral (1982[1983]) La subfamilia Calliptaminae en Espana (Orthoptera: Catantopidae) (in Spanish with English summary), Eos, Revista española de Entomología (Eos) 58:171-192
- OrthopteraSF: Orthoptera Species File. Eades D.C., Otte D., Cigliano M.M., Braun H., 2010-04-28
- Ramme (1927) Die Dermapteren und Orthopteren Siziliens und Kretas, mit kritischen Beiträgen und Revision aus den Gattungen Hololampra Sauss., Arcometopa Fieb., Pholidoptera Br., Platycleis Fieb., u.a., Eos, Revista española de Entomología (Eos) 3:111-200, 5 pls.
- Voisin [Ed.] (2003) Atlas des Orthoptères et des Mantides de France, Patrimoines Naturels 60:1-104
