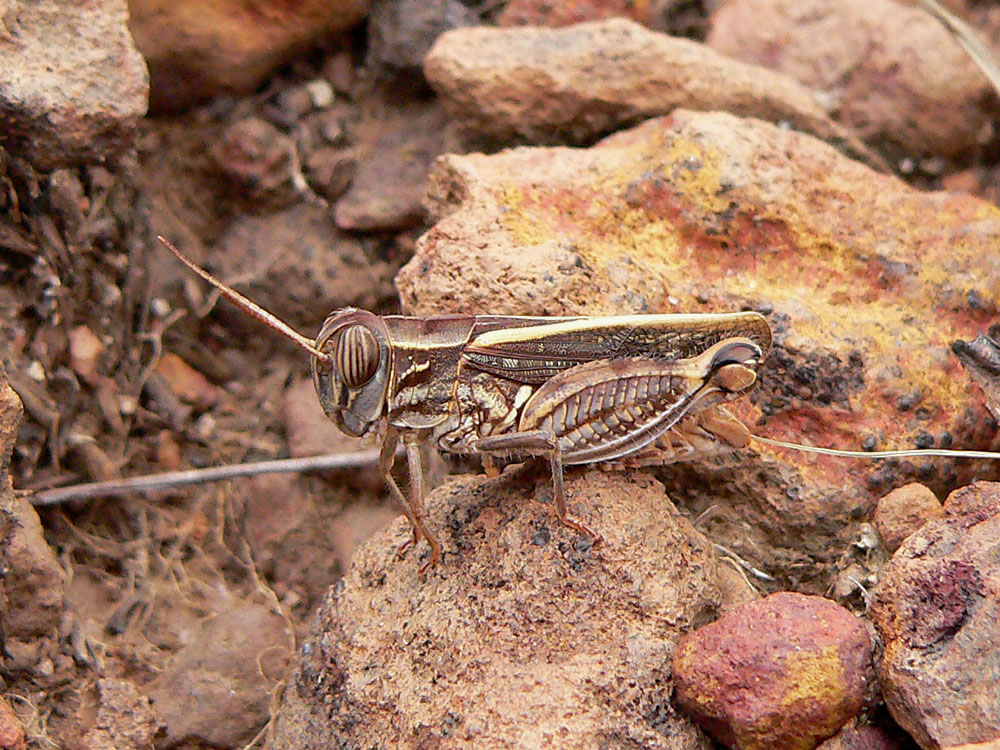
- Male Acorypha glaucopsis photographed near Bodjekali, Benin

Scientific classification
- Kingdom: Animalia
- Phylum: Arthropoda
- Clade: Pancrustacea
- Class: Insecta
- Order: Orthoptera
- Suborder: Caelifera
- Family: Acrididae
- Subfamily: Calliptaminae
- Genus: Acorypha
- Species: A. glaucopsis

Binomial name
- Acorypha glaucopsis (Walker, 1870)

= Acorypha glaucopsis =

Species of grasshopper

Acorypha glaucopsis is a species of short-horned grasshopper in the family Acrididae. It is found in Africa, the Arabian Peninsula, and South Asia.

== Human consumption ==
It is eaten by the Dogon people of Mali.

== Gallery ==
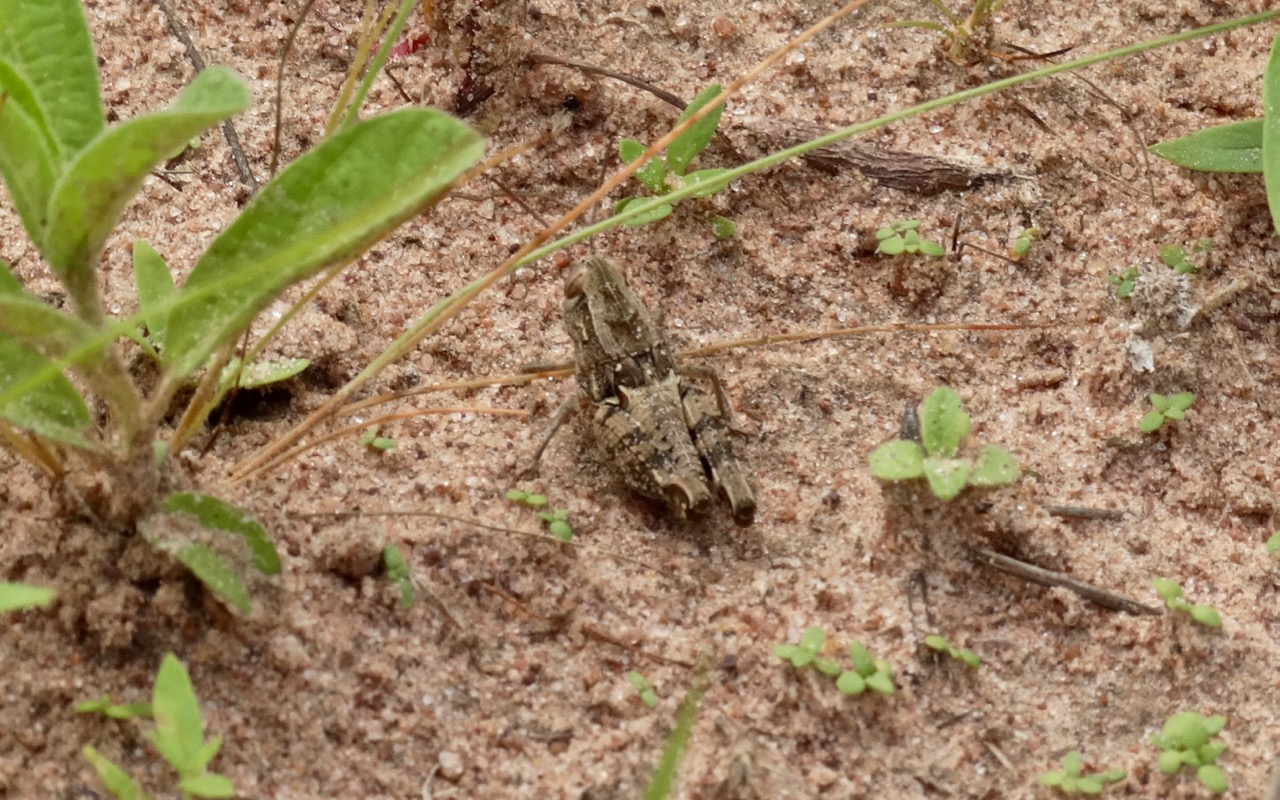
Fourth instar nymph photographed near Gnibi, Senegal

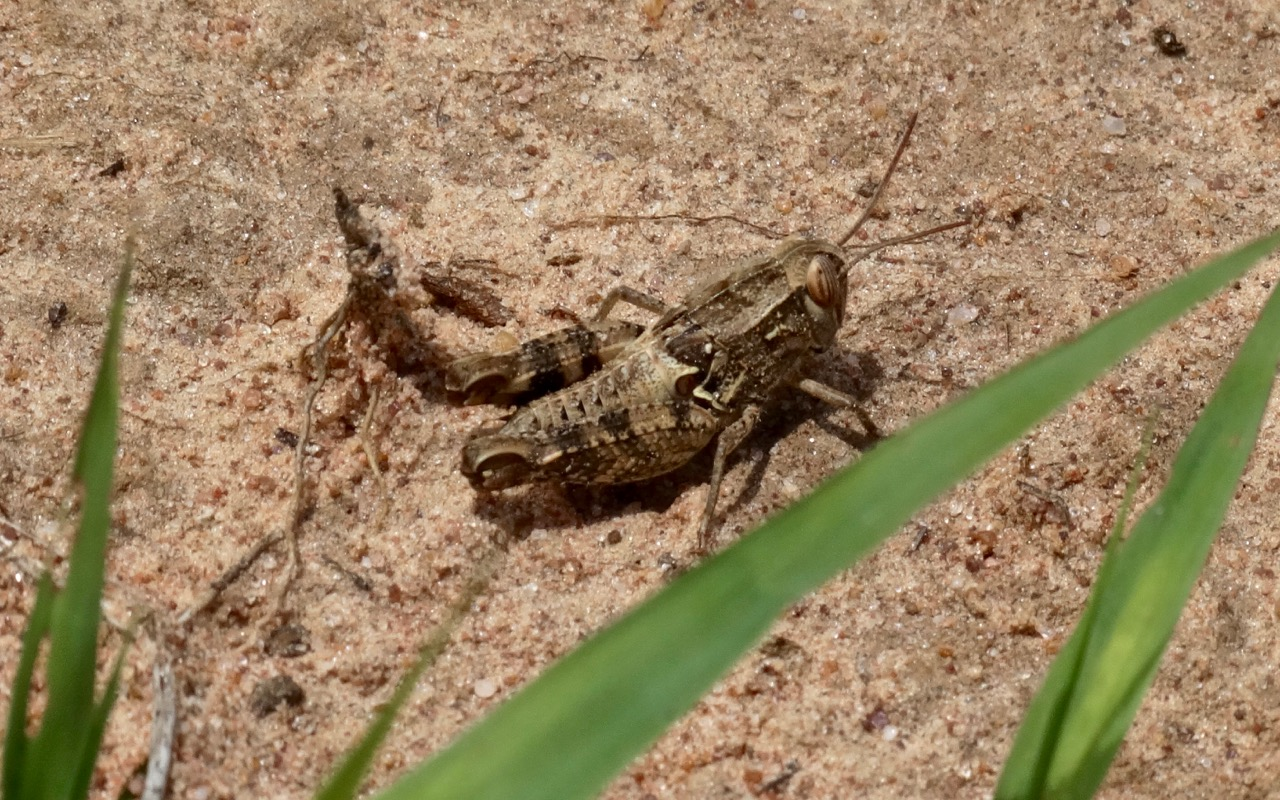
Fourth instar nymph photographed near Gnibi, Senegal
