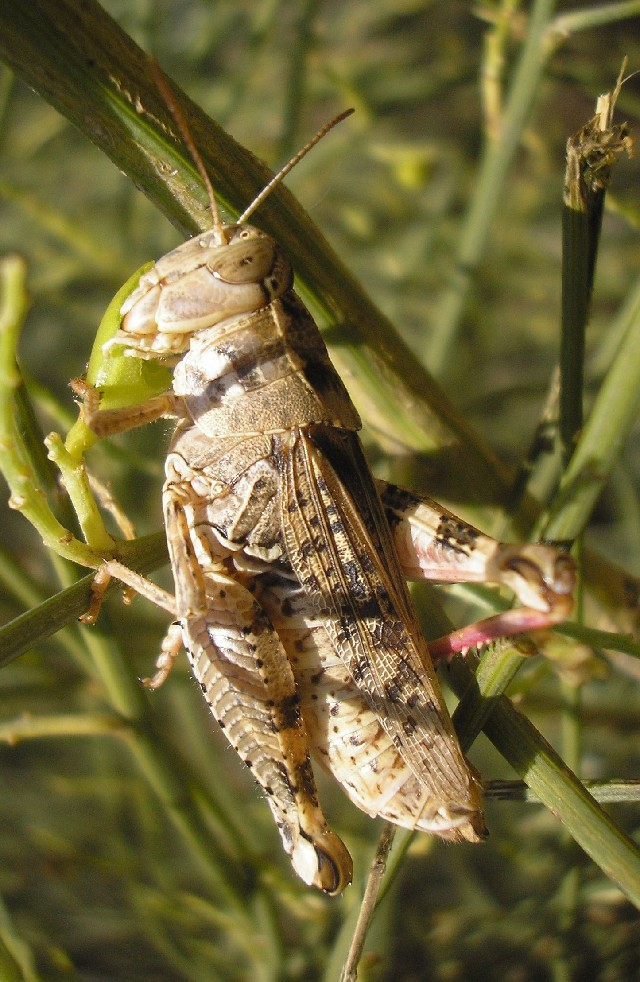
- Calliptamus wattenwylianus

Scientific classification
- Kingdom: Animalia
- Phylum: Arthropoda
- Clade: Pancrustacea
- Class: Insecta
- Order: Orthoptera
- Suborder: Caelifera
- Family: Acrididae
- Subfamily: Calliptaminae
- Genus: Calliptamus
- Species: C. wattenwylianus

Binomial name
- Calliptamus wattenwylianus Pantel, 1896

= Calliptamus wattenwylianus =

Species of short-horned grasshopper

Calliptamus wattenwylianus is a species of short-horned grasshopper in the family Acrididae. It is found in Europe and North Africa.

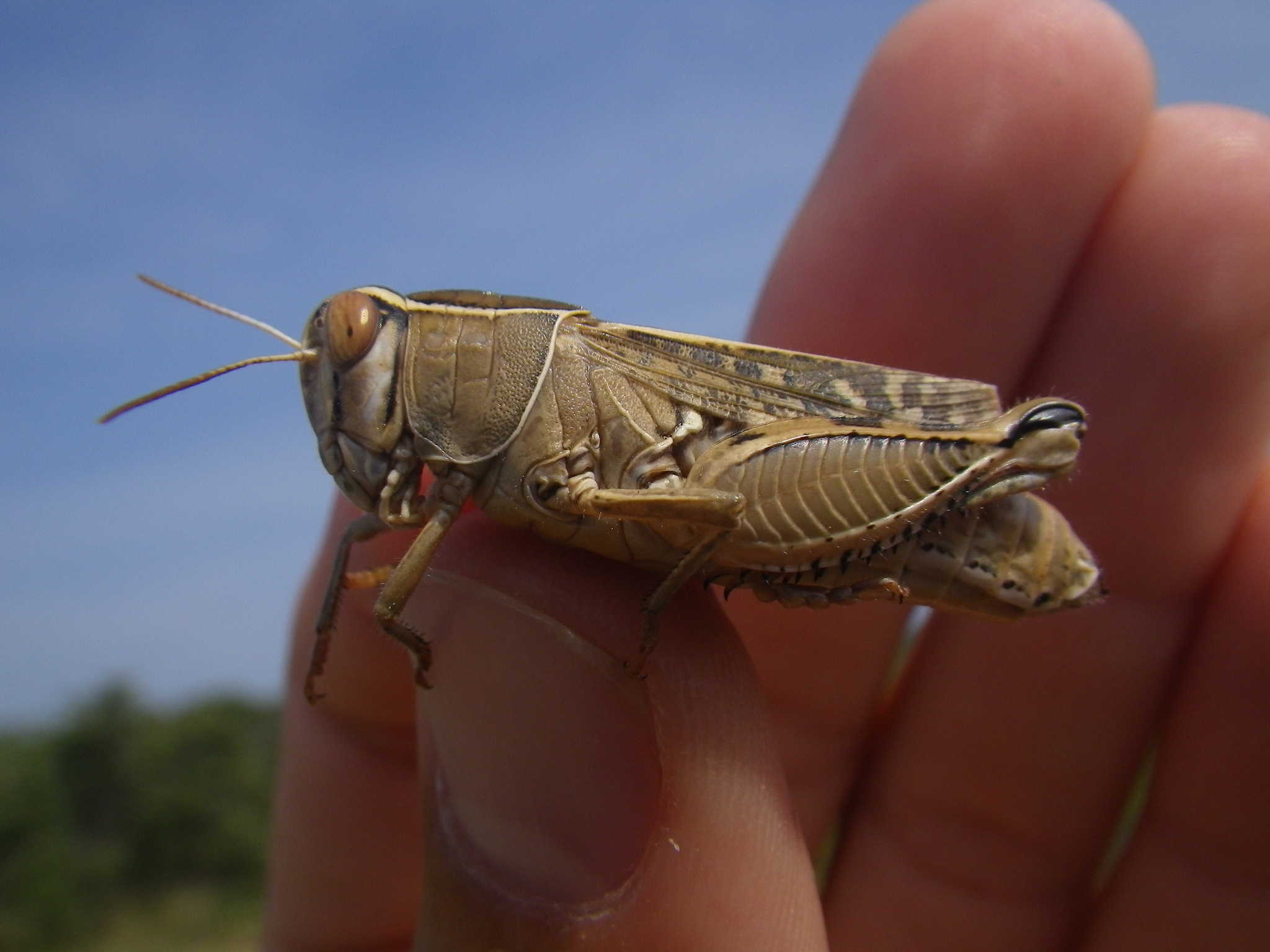
Calliptamus wattenwylianus, France

== Subspecies ==
These two subspecies belong to the species Calliptamus wattenwylianus:

- Calliptamus wattenwylianus okbaensis Kheil, 1915
- Calliptamus wattenwylianus wattenwylianus Pantel, 1896
