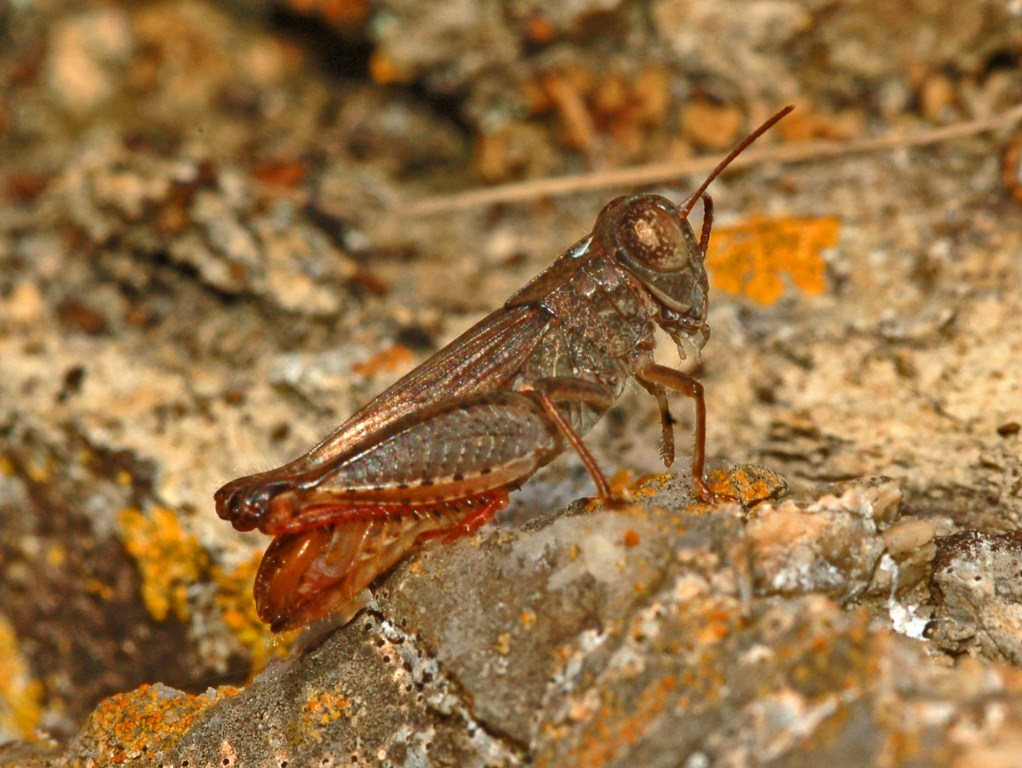
- Calliptamus italicus. Male
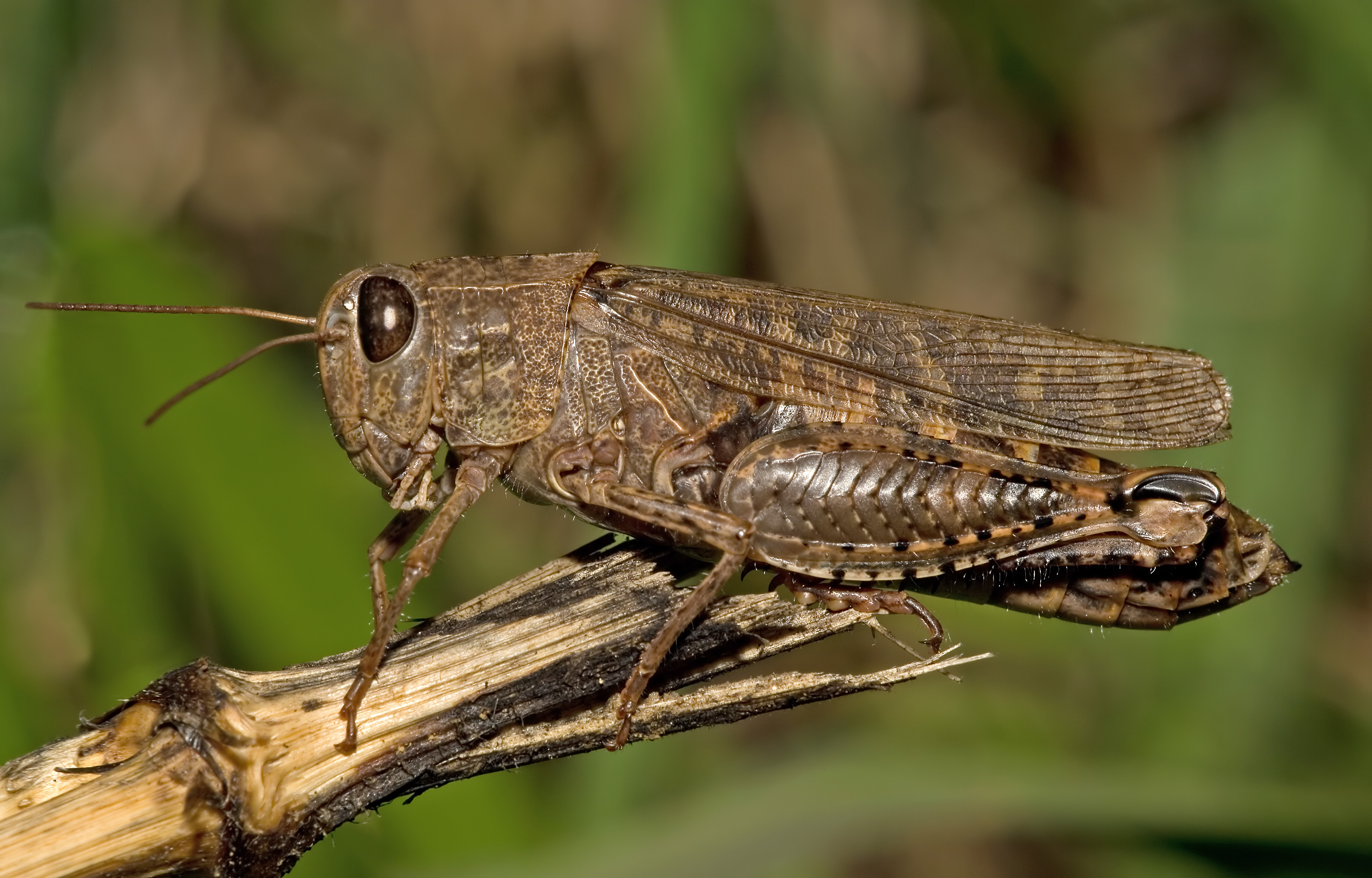
- Female

Scientific classification
- Kingdom: Animalia
- Phylum: Arthropoda
- Clade: Pancrustacea
- Class: Insecta
- Order: Orthoptera
- Suborder: Caelifera
- Family: Acrididae
- Genus: Calliptamus
- Species: C. italicus

Binomial name
- Calliptamus italicus (Linnaeus, 1758)

Synonyms
- Calliptenus cerisanus (Serville, 1838); Calliptenus cerasinus (misspelling)

= Calliptamus italicus =

Species of grasshopper

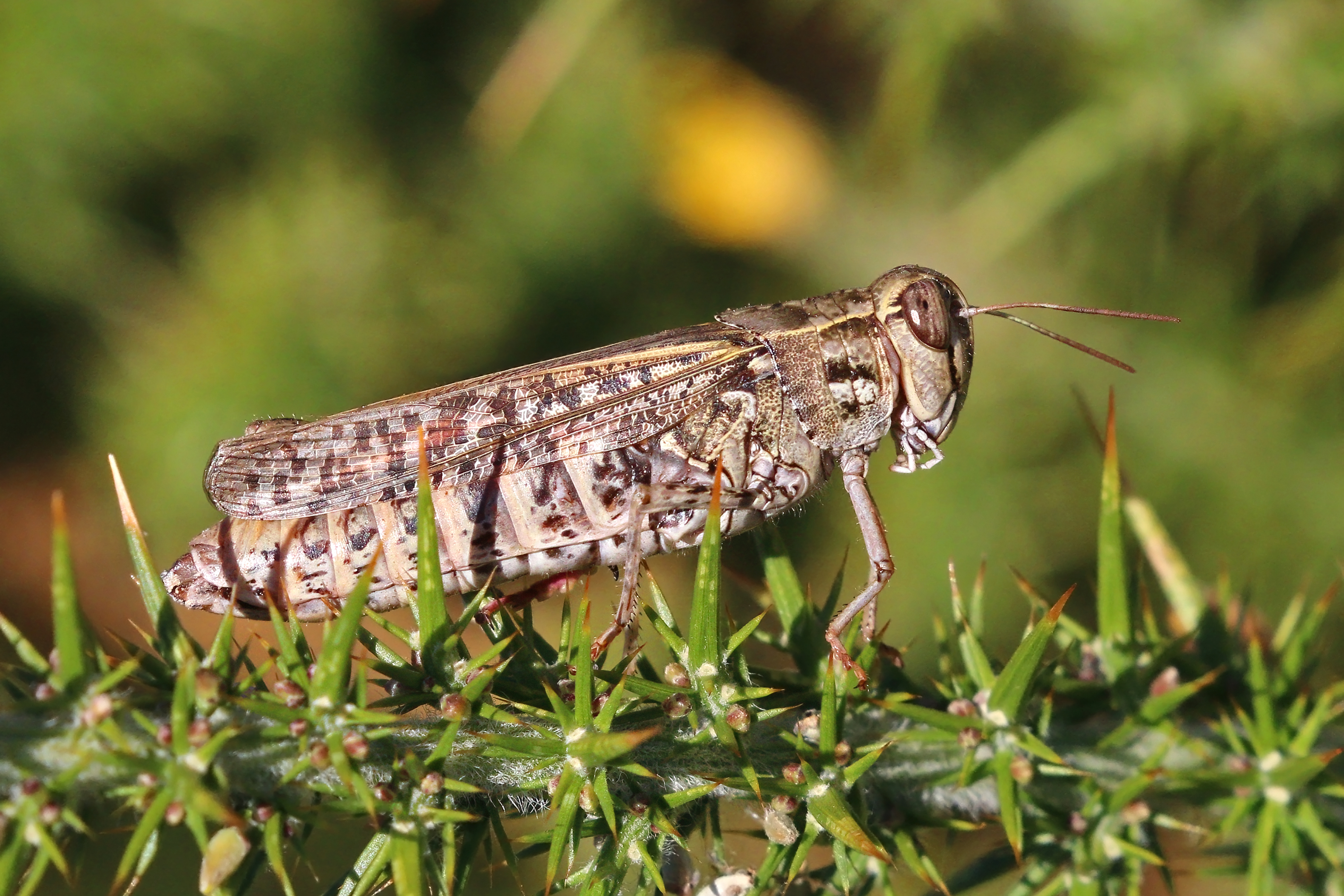
Italian locust (Calliptamus italicus) female, Nature Park of Alvão, Portugal

Close-Up of a Calliptamus italicus

Calliptamus italicus, the Italian locust, is a species of 'short-horned grasshopper' belonging to the family Acrididae, subfamily Calliptaminae.

This species is native of the steppes of Central Asia, but it is also present in most of Europe, in the eastern Palearctic realm, in North Africa, and in the Near East.

== Distribution and habitat ==
Calliptamus italicus is found in Western Europe and Central Asia. Its range extends from North Africa and the countries bordering the Mediterranean Sea to Central Europe, Central Asia, Mongolia and western Siberia. These grasshoppers can be encountered from July through October. It thrives in warm dry habitats with sparse vegetation cover such as grasslands and rocky steppes, old quarries, gravel pits, rock-strewn areas beside rivers, sand dunes and fallow land.

== Description ==
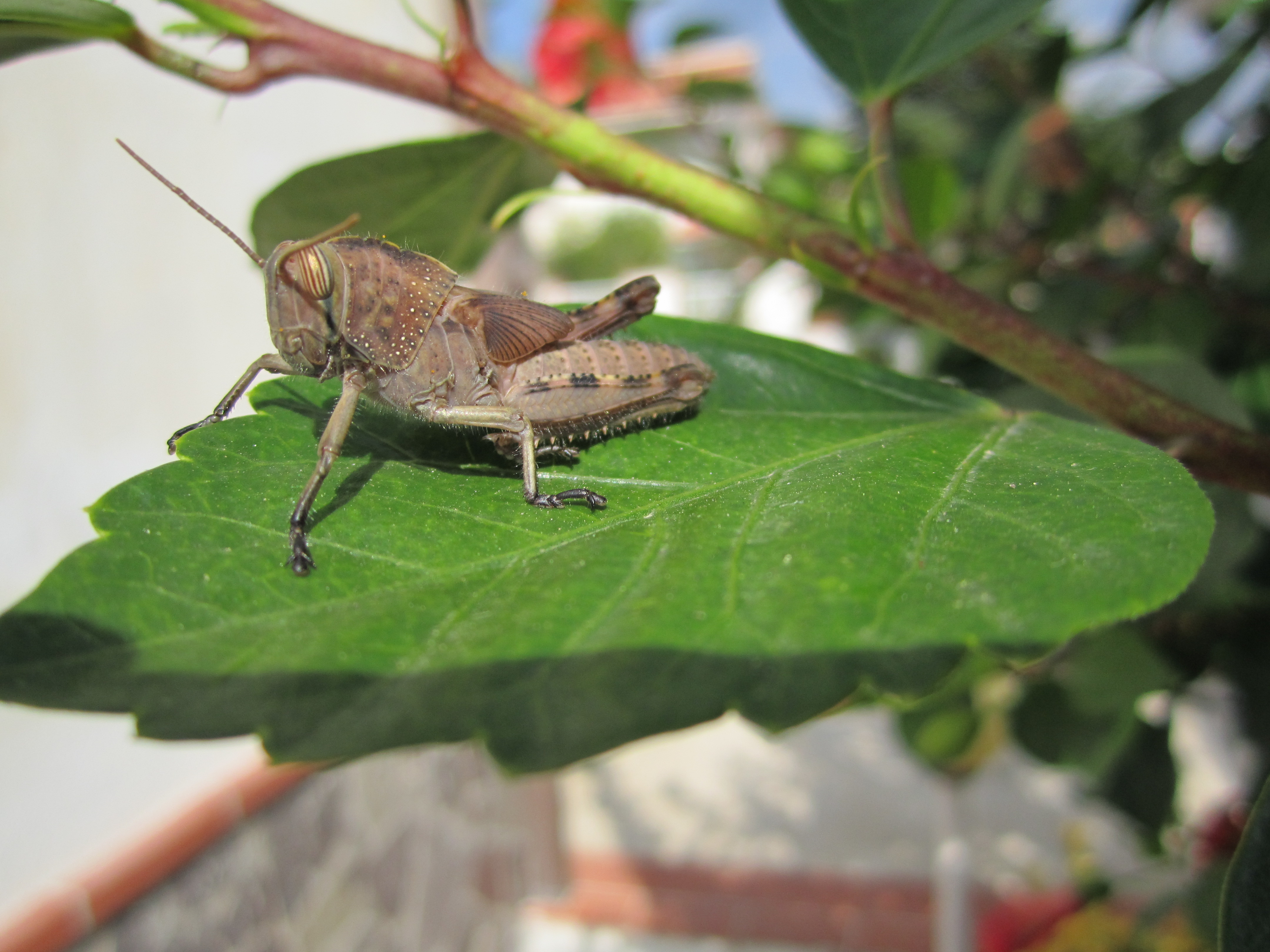
Young

Calliptamus italicus is a medium-sized grasshopper characterized by a significant sexual dimorphism. The adult males grow up to 14–26 millimetres (0.55–1.02 in) long, while females reach 21–40 millimetres (0.83–1.57 in) of length. This species is quite variable in size and colour. The basic coloration of the body varies from gray to brownish-reddish. The wings have a characteristic reddish or pinkish coloration, better visible when the insect is in flight. Quite evident is the dilating membrane ('pallium') of the subgenital plate of males.

== Ecology ==
Calliptamus italicus is a polyphagous species, able to feed upon various wild plants, but also on crops, especially legumes. Alfalfa (Medicago sativa) is among the species preferred by juveniles, but there have been reported sporadic cases of infestation on grains and grapevine. It feeds on a variety of plants in the families Asteraceae, Chenopodiaceae and Poaceae.

Their life cycle lasts one year. The egg-laying takes place in late August - early September, usually in rocky areas exposed to the south. The female lays eggs in the soil within an ootheca that can hold 25 to 55 eggs wrapped in a spongy secretion. The appearance of the larvae takes place in May–June; the first adults appear in July.

In certain circumstances this species may develop a tendency to gregariousness with formation of very numerous aggregates, potentially harmful to crops. It normally occurs in low densities in undisturbed sparse grassland but disappears when the land is cultivated. It occurs in high densities in uncultivated land that is invaded by Artemisia, and on overgrazed pastures with weeds and bare ground. Under these conditions it can become gregarious and form locust swarms. After the breakup of the USSR in 1991, much agricultural land was left uncultivated. This gave ideal conditions for the Italian locust to breed and build up in numbers, and Kazakhstan suffered a devastating locust plague between 1998 and 2001.

== Subspecies ==
- C. italicus var. albotibialis Nedelkov, 1907
- C. italicus var. italicus Nedelkov, 1907

The following subspecies proposed in the past are no longer accepted. They are currently included in the nominal subspecies.

- C. italicus var. carbonaria Uvarov, 1914 – C. coelesyriensis (Giglio-Tos, 1893)
- C. italicus var. reductus Ramme, 1927 – C. italicus var. italicus Linnaeus, 1758)
- C. italicus var. bilineata Puschnig, 1910 – C. italicus var. italicus Linnaeus, 1758)
- C. italicus var. insularis Ramme, 1951 – C. italicus var. italicus Linnaeus, 1758)
- C. italicus var. afghanus Ramme, 1952 – C. italicus var. italicus Linnaeus, 1758)
- C. italicus var. grandis Ramme, 1927 – C. italicus var. italicus Linnaeus, 1758)
- C. italicus var. gilvonigricans Voroncovskij, 1927 – C. italicus var. italicus Linnaeus, 1758)
- C. italicus var. blandus Ivanov, 1888 – C. italicus var. italicus Linnaeus, 1758)
