= Paracaloptenus =

Scientific classification
- Kingdom: Animalia
- Phylum: Arthropoda
- Clade: Pancrustacea
- Class: Insecta
- Order: Orthoptera
- Suborder: Caelifera
- Family: Acrididae
- Subfamily: Calliptaminae
- Genus: Paracaloptenus; Bolívar, 1878

Genus of grasshoppers

External image
- Images at iNaturalist

Paracaloptenus is a genus of Palaearctic grasshoppers in the subfamily Calliptaminae, erected by Ignacio Bolívar in 1878. Records of occurrence are from Spain and France, with a discontinuous (probably incomplete) distribution through to Ukraine and Turkey.

== Species ==
The Orthoptera Species File lists:

1. Paracaloptenus bolivari Uvarov, 1942
2. Paracaloptenus caloptenoides (Brunner von Wattenwyl, 1861), subspecies:
  1. P. caloptenoides brunneri (Stål, 1876)
  2. P. caloptenoides caloptenoides (Brunner von Wattenwyl, 1861) - type species (as Platyphyma caloptenoides Brunner von Wattenwyl)
  3. P. caloptenoides moreanus Willemse, 1973
3. Paracaloptenus cristatus Willemse, 1973
