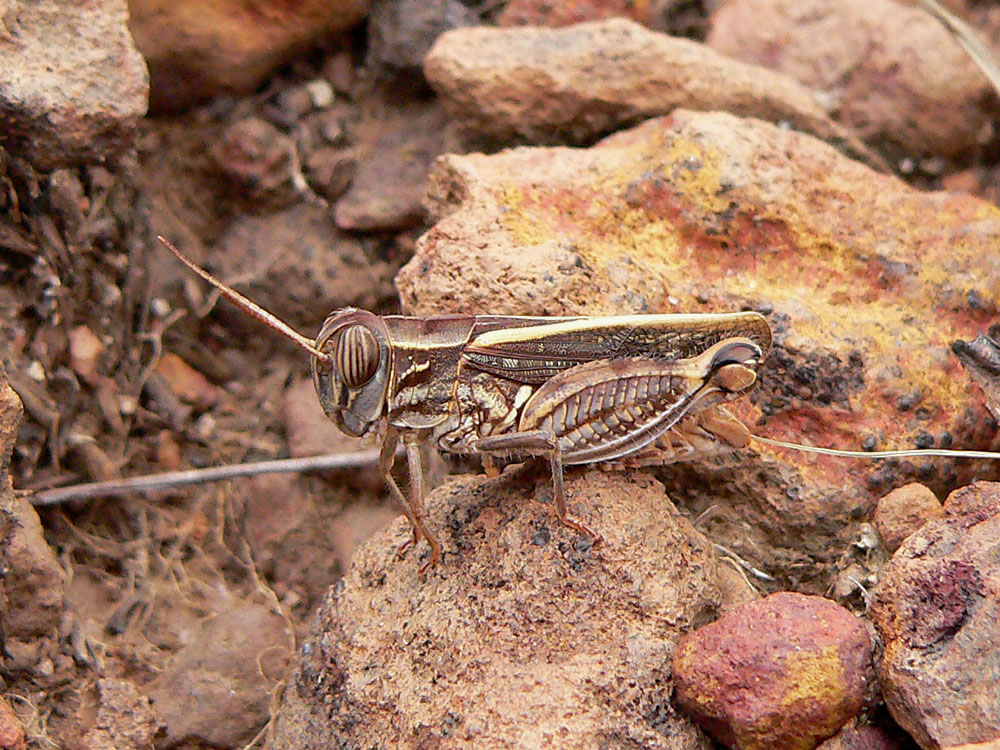
- Acorypha glaucopsis male, Benin

Scientific classification
- Kingdom: Animalia
- Phylum: Arthropoda
- Clade: Pancrustacea
- Class: Insecta
- Order: Orthoptera
- Suborder: Caelifera
- Family: Acrididae
- Subfamily: Calliptaminae
- Genus: Acorypha; Krauss, 1877

Synonyms
- Bothrocara Uvarov, 1950; Bothrocaracris Uvarov, 1954; Caloptenopsis Bolívar, 1889; Caloptenopsisi Johnston, 1956

= Acorypha =

Genus of grasshoppers

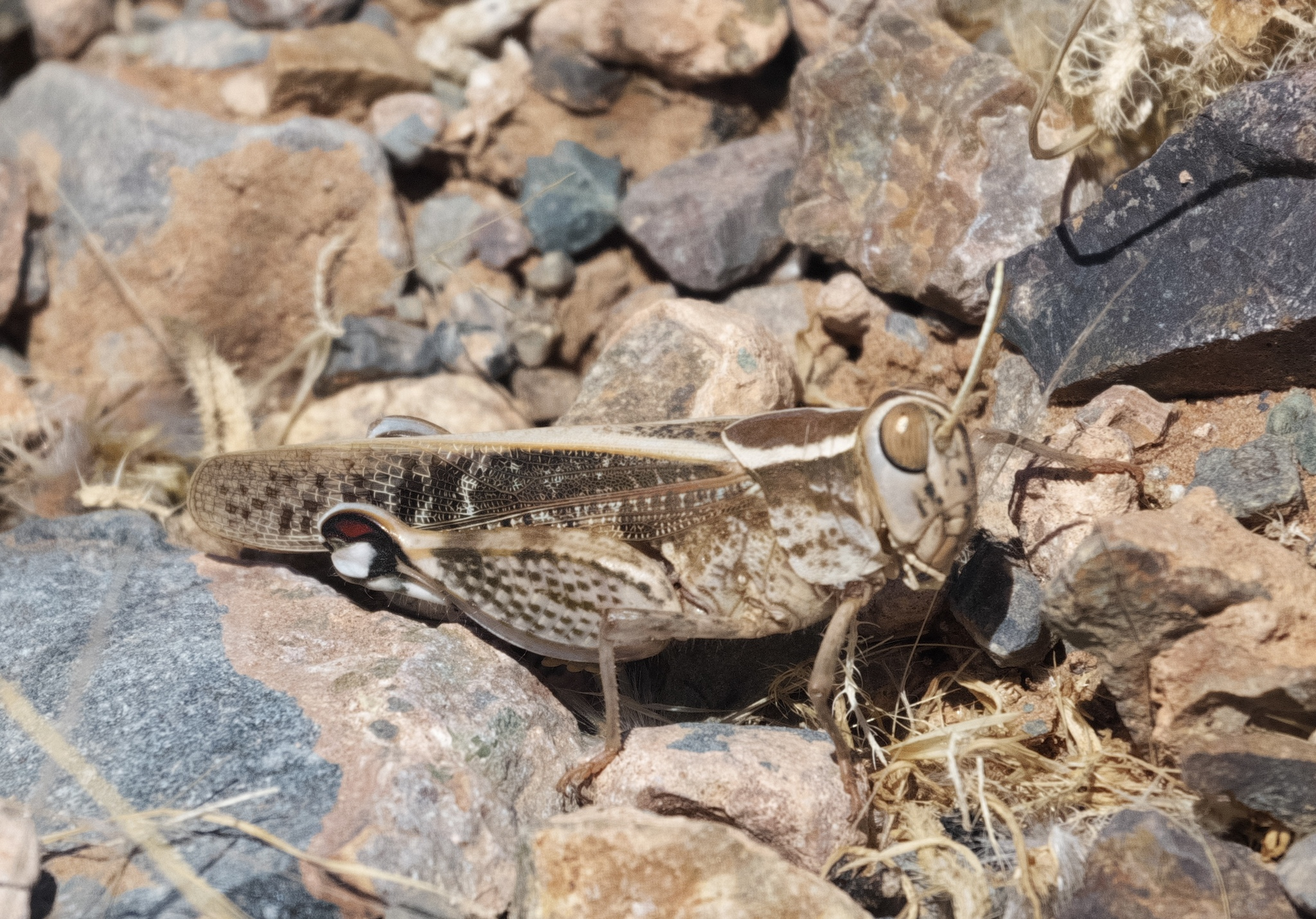
Acorypha pallidicornis, Namibia

Acorypha is a genus of grasshoppers belonging to the family Acrididae.

The species of this genus are found in Africa, the Middle East and Asia.

== Species ==
The Orthoptera species file includes:

1. Acorypha bimaculata (Krauss, 1902)
2. Acorypha brazzavillei (Sjöstedt, 1931)
3. Acorypha clara (Walker, 1870)
4. Acorypha concisa (Walker, 1870)
5. Acorypha corallipes Sjöstedt, 1931
6. Acorypha decisa (Walker, 1870)
7. Acorypha dipelecia Jago, 1966
8. Acorypha divisa (Uvarov, 1950)
9. Acorypha ferrifer (Walker, 1870)
10. Acorypha glaucopsis (Walker, 1870)
11. Acorypha hemiptera (Uvarov, 1950)
12. Acorypha insignis (Walker, 1870)
13. Acorypha johnstoni (Kirby, 1902)
14. Acorypha karschi (Martínez y Fernández-Castillo, 1902)
15. Acorypha laticosta (Karsch, 1896)
16. Acorypha macracantha (Martínez y Fernández-Castillo, 1898)
17. Acorypha modesta Uvarov, 1950
18. Acorypha nigrovariegata (Bolívar, 1889)
19. Acorypha nodula (Giglio-Tos, 1907)
20. Acorypha onerosa (Uvarov, 1950)
21. Acorypha ornatipes Uvarov, 1950
22. Acorypha pallidicornis (Stål, 1876)
23. Acorypha picta Krauss, 1877 - type species
24. Acorypha pipinna Jago, 1967
25. Acorypha pulla (Uvarov, 1950)
26. Acorypha recta Uvarov, 1950
27. Acorypha reducta (Kevan, 1967)
28. Acorypha saddiensis Kevan, 1967
29. Acorypha saussurei (Martínez y Fernández-Castillo, 1896)
30. Acorypha signata (Walker, 1870)
31. Acorypha unicarinata (Krauss, 1877)
32. Acorypha vittata (Bolívar, 1889)
