= Sphodronotus =

Scientific classification
- Kingdom: Animalia
- Phylum: Arthropoda
- Clade: Pancrustacea
- Class: Insecta
- Order: Orthoptera
- Suborder: Caelifera
- Family: Acrididae
- Subfamily: Calliptaminae
- Genus: Sphodronotus; Uvarov, 1943

Type species
- Sphodromerus cyclopterus Uvarov, 1943

Genus of grasshoppers

Sphodronotus is a genus of grasshoppers in the subfamily Calliptaminae, with species found in Iran.

== Species ==
The following species are recognised in the genus Sphodronotus:

- Sphodronotus cyclopterus (Uvarov, 1933)
- Sphodronotus grandis Popov, 1951
