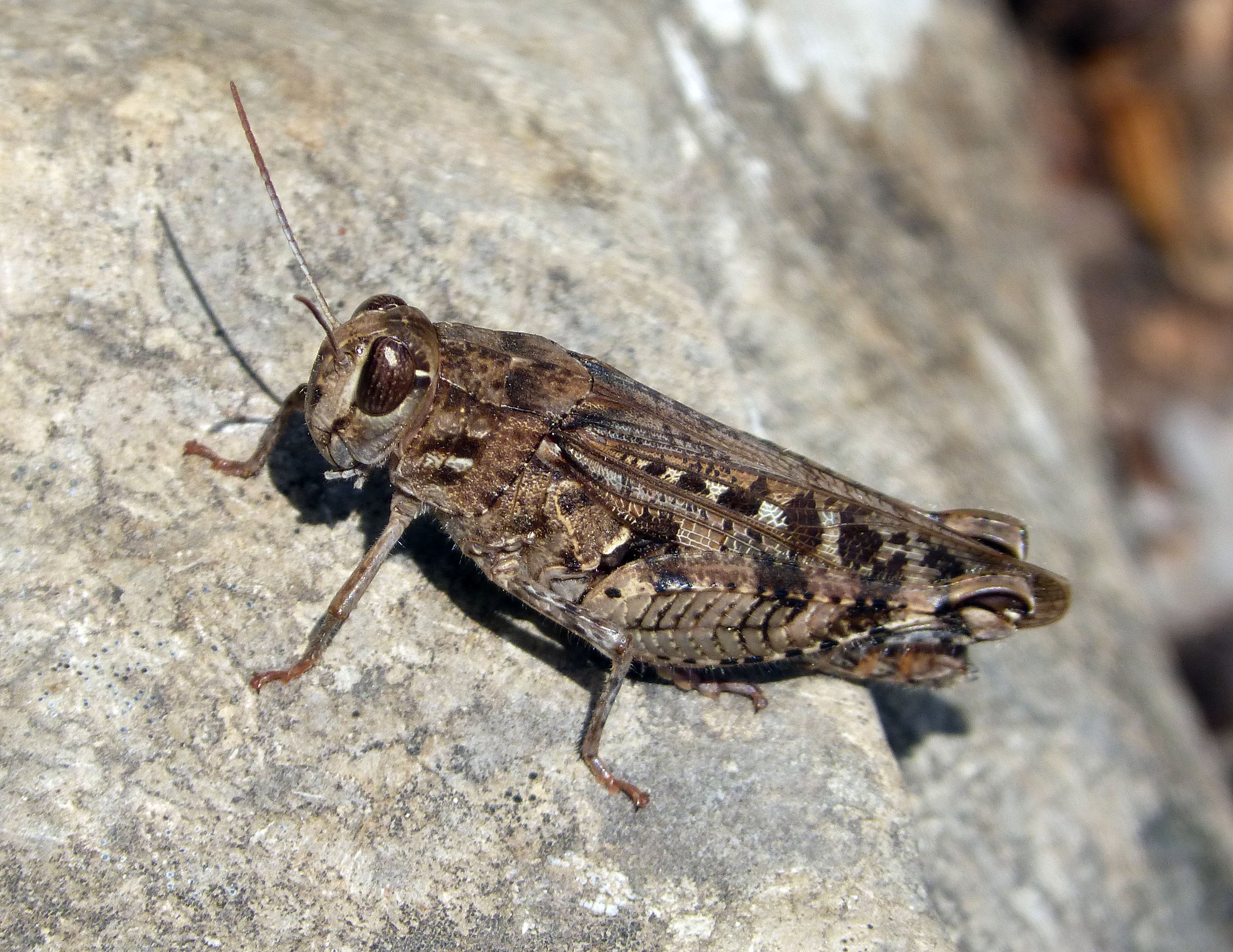
- Calliptamus barbarus

Scientific classification
- Kingdom: Animalia
- Phylum: Arthropoda
- Clade: Pancrustacea
- Class: Insecta
- Order: Orthoptera
- Suborder: Caelifera
- Family: Acrididae
- Subfamily: Calliptaminae
- Genus: Calliptamus; Serville, 1831

= Calliptamus =

Genus of grasshoppers

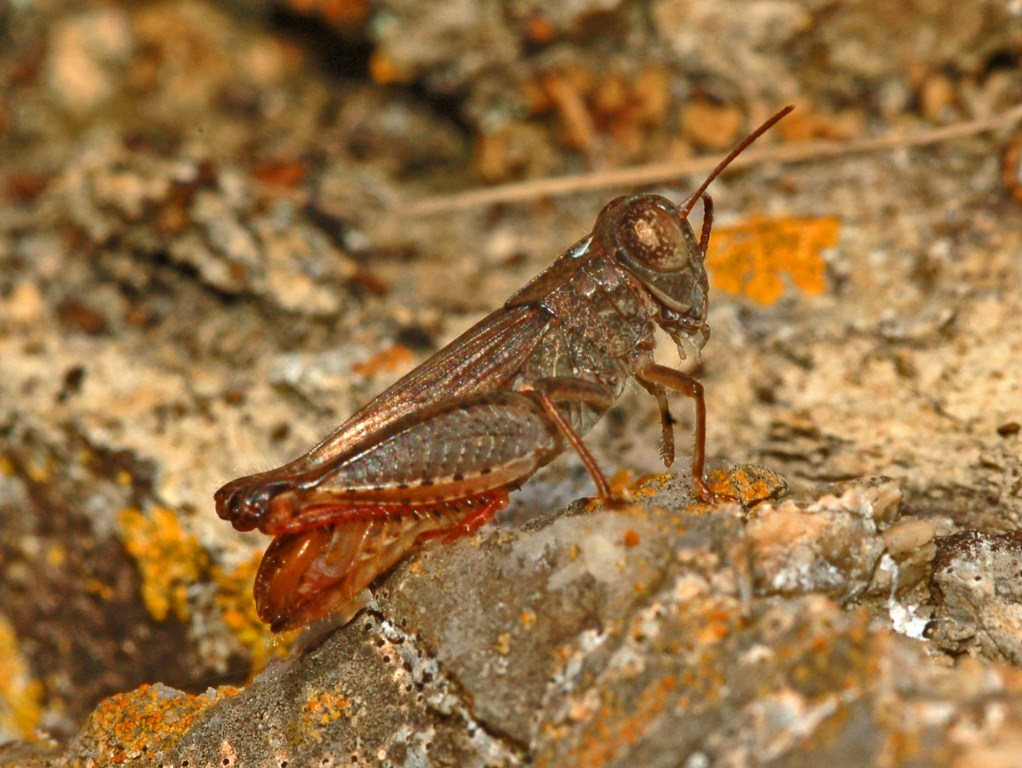
Calliptamus italicus

Calliptamus is a genus of grasshoppers in the family Acrididae. Species of Calliptamus are found in Africa and the northern Palearctic realm (mainland Europe not including Scandinavia) through to Japan.

== Species ==
Species within this genus include:

1. Calliptamus abbreviatus Ikonnikov, 1913
2. Calliptamus balucha Uvarov, 1938
3. Calliptamus barbarus (Costa, 1836)
4. Calliptamus cicatricosus Bolívar, 1889
5. Calliptamus coelesyriensis Giglio-Tos, 1893
6. Calliptamus cyrenaicus Jago, 1963
7. Calliptamus deserticola Vosseler, 1902
8. Calliptamus italicus (Linnaeus, 1758) (Italian locust) type species (as Gryllus italicus L)
9. Calliptamus madeirae Uvarov, 1937 (Madeira Pincer Grasshopper)
10. Calliptamus montanus Chopard, 1937
11. Calliptamus plebeius (Walker, 1870)
12. Calliptamus siciliae Ramme, 1927 (Pygmy Pincer Grasshopper)
13. Calliptamus tenuicercis Tarbinsky, 1930
14. Calliptamus testaceus Walker, 1870
15. Calliptamus turanicus Tarbinsky, 1930
16. Calliptamus wattenwylianus Pantel, 1896
17. † Calliptamus strausi Harz, 1973
