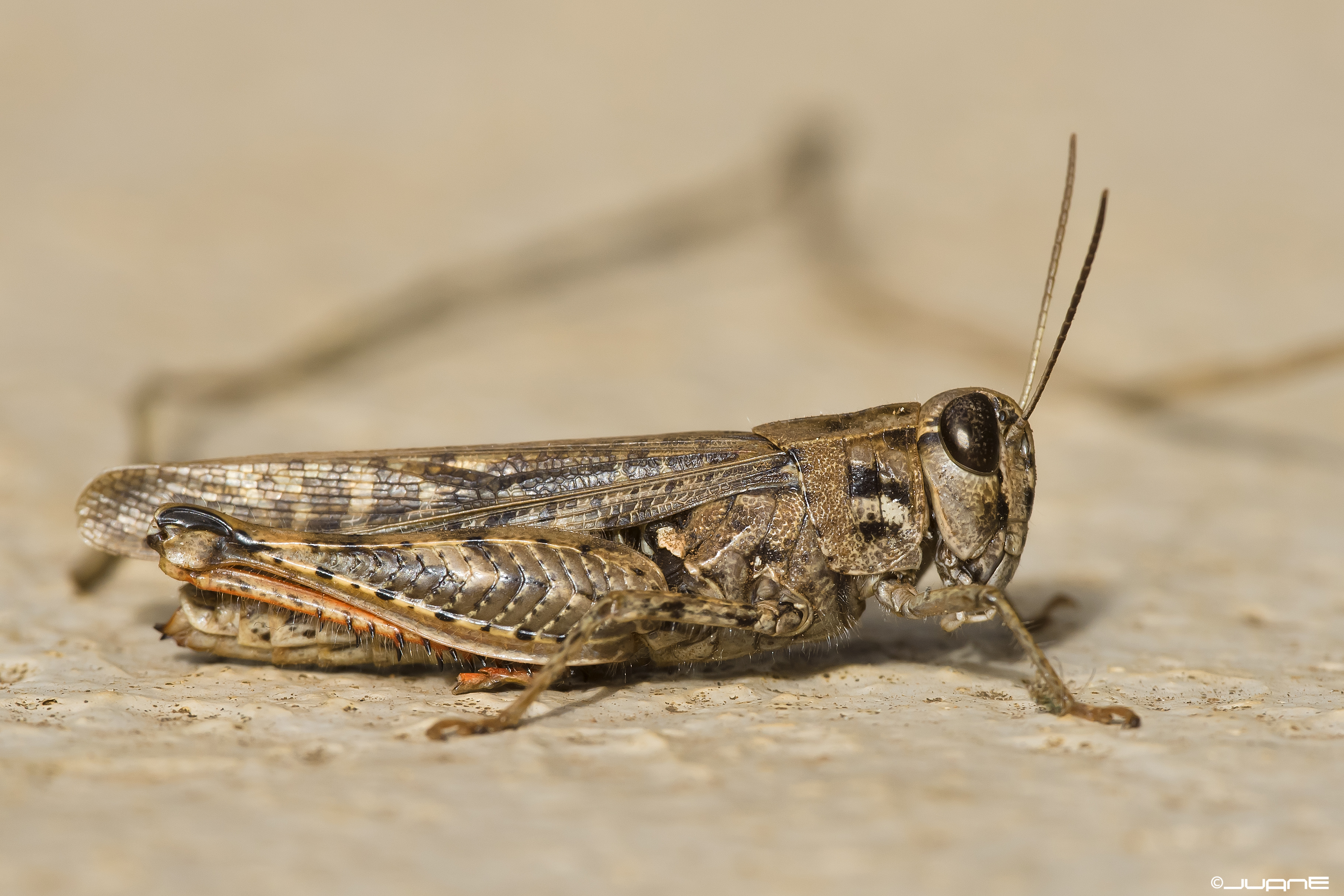
- In Spain

Conservation status
- Least Concern (IUCN 3.1)

Scientific classification
- Kingdom: Animalia
- Phylum: Arthropoda
- Clade: Pancrustacea
- Class: Insecta
- Order: Orthoptera
- Suborder: Caelifera
- Family: Acrididae
- Genus: Calliptamus
- Species: C. plebeius

Binomial name
- Calliptamus plebeius (Walker, 1870)

= Calliptamus plebeius =

Species of grasshopper

Calliptamus plebeius is a species of short-horned grasshopper in the family Acrididae. It is found in southern Europe and northern Africa.

The IUCN conservation status of Calliptamus plebeius is "LC", least concern, with no immediate threat to the species' survival. The IUCN status was assessed in 2016.

== Subspecies ==
These subspecies belong to the species Calliptamus plebeius:

- Calliptamus plebeius bifasciata Krauss, 1892
- Calliptamus plebeius plebeius (Walker, 1870) (Canarian Pincer Grasshopper)
