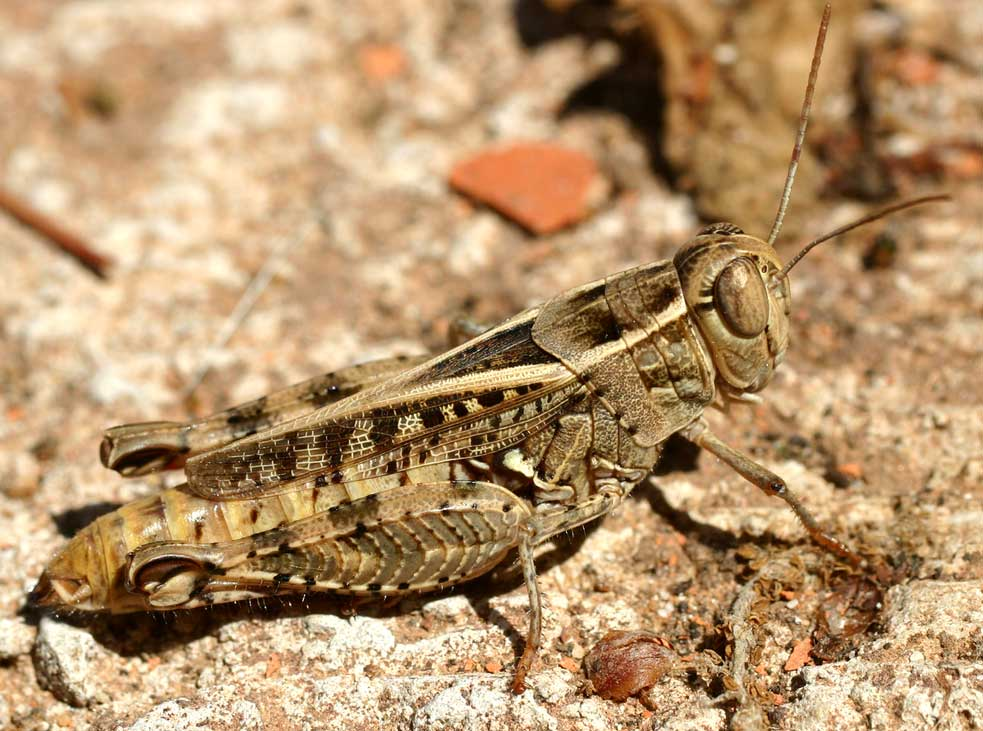
- Calliptamus italicus Photo from http://www.entomart.be/

Scientific classification
- Kingdom: Animalia
- Phylum: Arthropoda
- Clade: Pancrustacea
- Class: Insecta
- Order: Orthoptera
- Suborder: Caelifera
- Family: Acrididae
- Subfamily: Calliptaminae; Jacobson, 1905

Synonyms
- Calliptami Jacobson, 1905; Caloptenidae Brunner von Wattenwyl, 1893; Calopteninae Brunner von Wattenwyl, 1893; Calliptamini Jacobson, 1905; Calopteni Brunner von Wattenwyl, 1893

= Calliptaminae =

Subfamily of grasshoppers

The Calliptaminae are a subfamily of grasshoppers containing species found in Africa, Europe and Asia; some are economically important. It was originally erected as a tribe by G.G. Jacobson in 1905 as the "Calliptamini", later uprated by Dirsh in 1956.

== Genera ==
The Orthoptera Species File includes:

1. Acorypha Krauss, 1877
2. Bosumia Ramme, 1929
3. Braxyxenia Kirby, 1914
4. Calliptamus Serville, 1831
5. Damaracris Brown, 1972
6. Indomerus Dirsh, 1951
7. Palaciosa Bolívar, 1930
8. Paracaloptenus Bolívar, 1876
9. Peripolus Martínez y Fernández-Castillo, 1898
10. Sphodromerus Stål, 1873
11. Sphodronotus Uvarov, 1943
12. Stobbea Ramme, 1929
