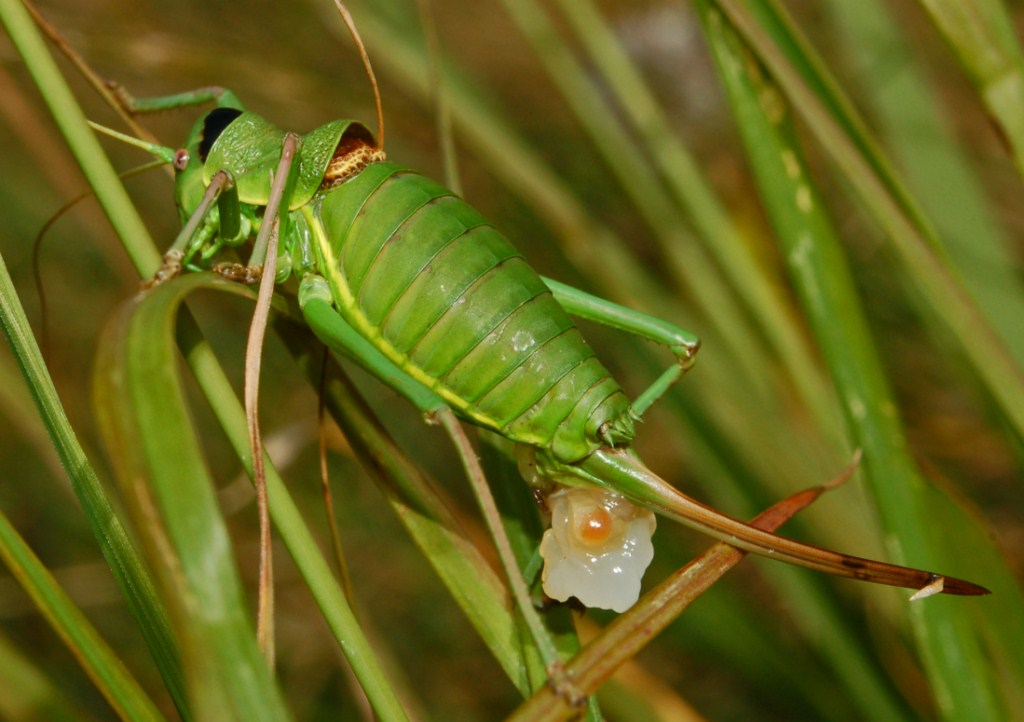
- Ephippiger perforatus, female

Scientific classification
- Domain: Eukaryota
- Kingdom: Animalia
- Phylum: Arthropoda
- Class: Insecta
- Order: Orthoptera
- Suborder: Ensifera
- Family: Tettigoniidae
- Tribe: Ephippigerini
- Genus: Ephippiger; Berthold, 1827

Synonyms
- Ephippigera Serville, 1831; Ephippiiger Azam, 1913

= Ephippiger =

Genus of cricket-like animals

Ephippiger is a genus of Palaearctic bush crickets described by Berthold in 1827, belonging to the family Tettigoniidae, subfamily Bradyporinae and tribe Ephippigerini.

== Description ==
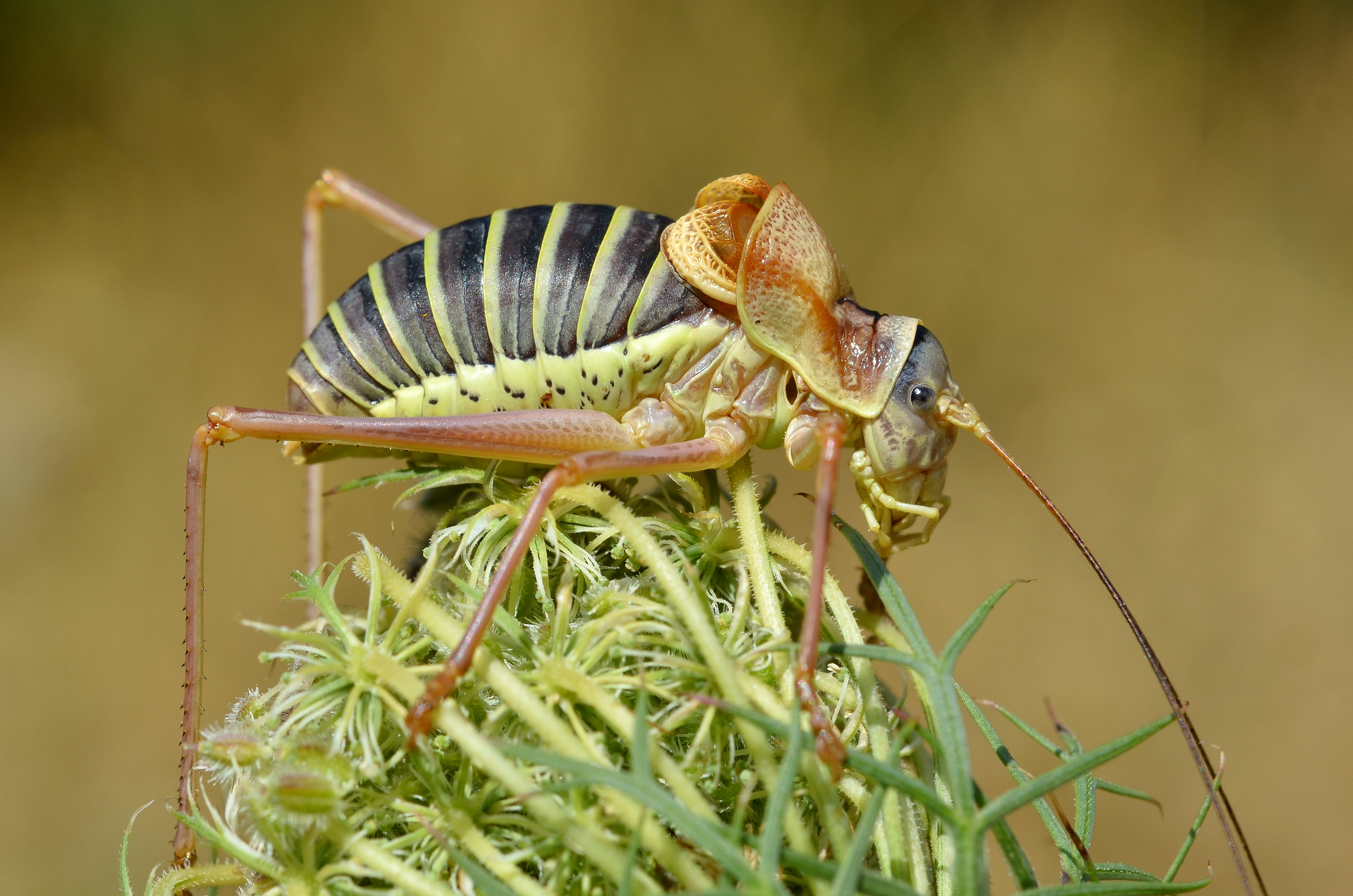
Ephippiger ephippiger, male

Bush crickets of this genus have very small wings and the pronotum resembles a saddle (the Latin name ephippium means 'saddle of a horse').

The atrophied wings of Ephippiger species are unfit for flight and are only used for the emission of sounds (stridulation).

== Distribution ==
Species of this genus are mainly present in Austria, Belgium, Croatia, Czech Republic, France, Germany, Italy, Romania, Spain, Iran and Switzerland.

== List of species ==
1. Ephippiger apulus (Ramme, 1933)
2. Ephippiger camillae Fontana & Massa, 2000
3. Ephippiger carlottae Fontana & Odé, 2003
4. Ephippiger cavannai Targioni-Tozzetti, 1881
5. Ephippiger diurnus Dufour, 1841
6. Ephippiger ephippiger (Fiebig, 1784) - type species (as Gryllus ephippiger Fiebig = E. ephippiger ephippiger)
7. Ephippiger melisi Baccetti, 1959
8. Ephippiger perforatus (Rossius, 1790)
9. Ephippiger persicarius Fruhstorfer, 1921
10. Ephippiger provincialis Yersin, 1854
11. Ephippiger ruffoi Galvagni, 1955
12. Ephippiger terrestris Yersin, 1854
13. Ephippiger tropicalis Baccetti, 1985
14. Ephippiger zelleri Fischer, 1853

== Gallery ==
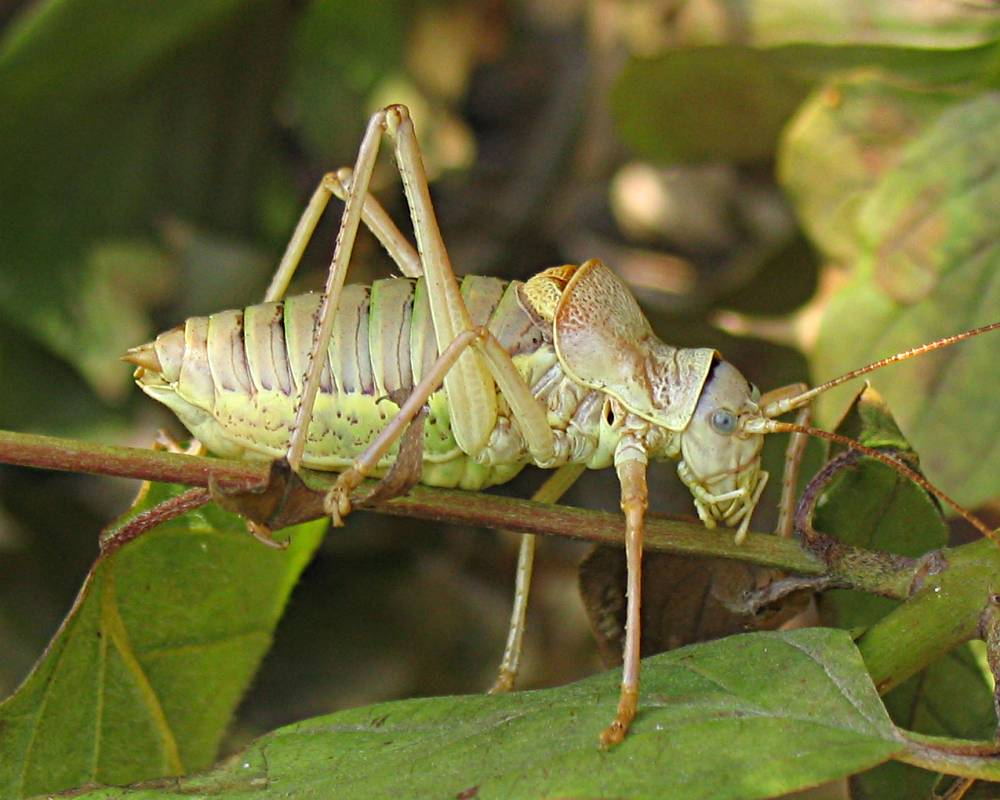
Ephippiger ephippiger

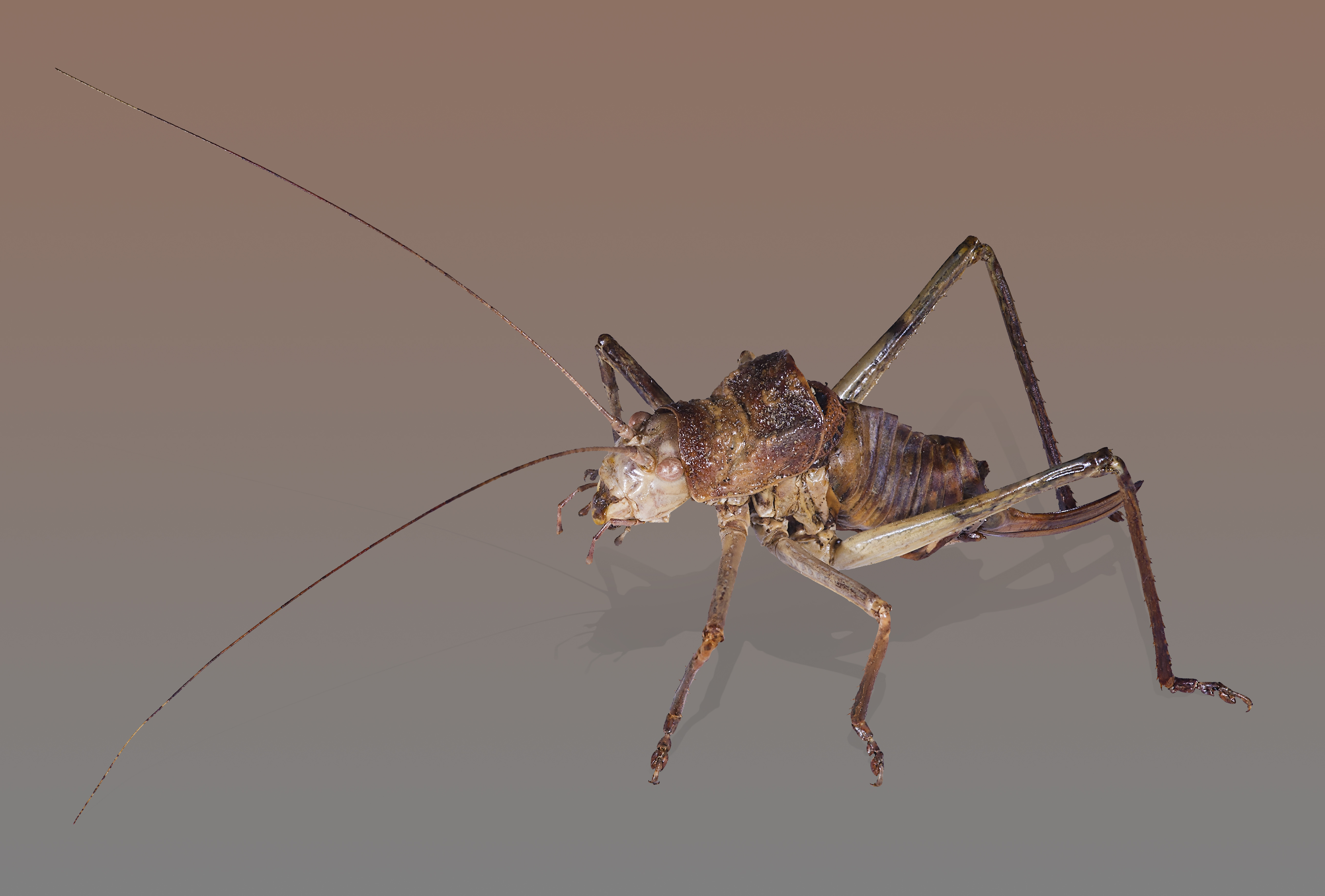
Ephippiger provincialis

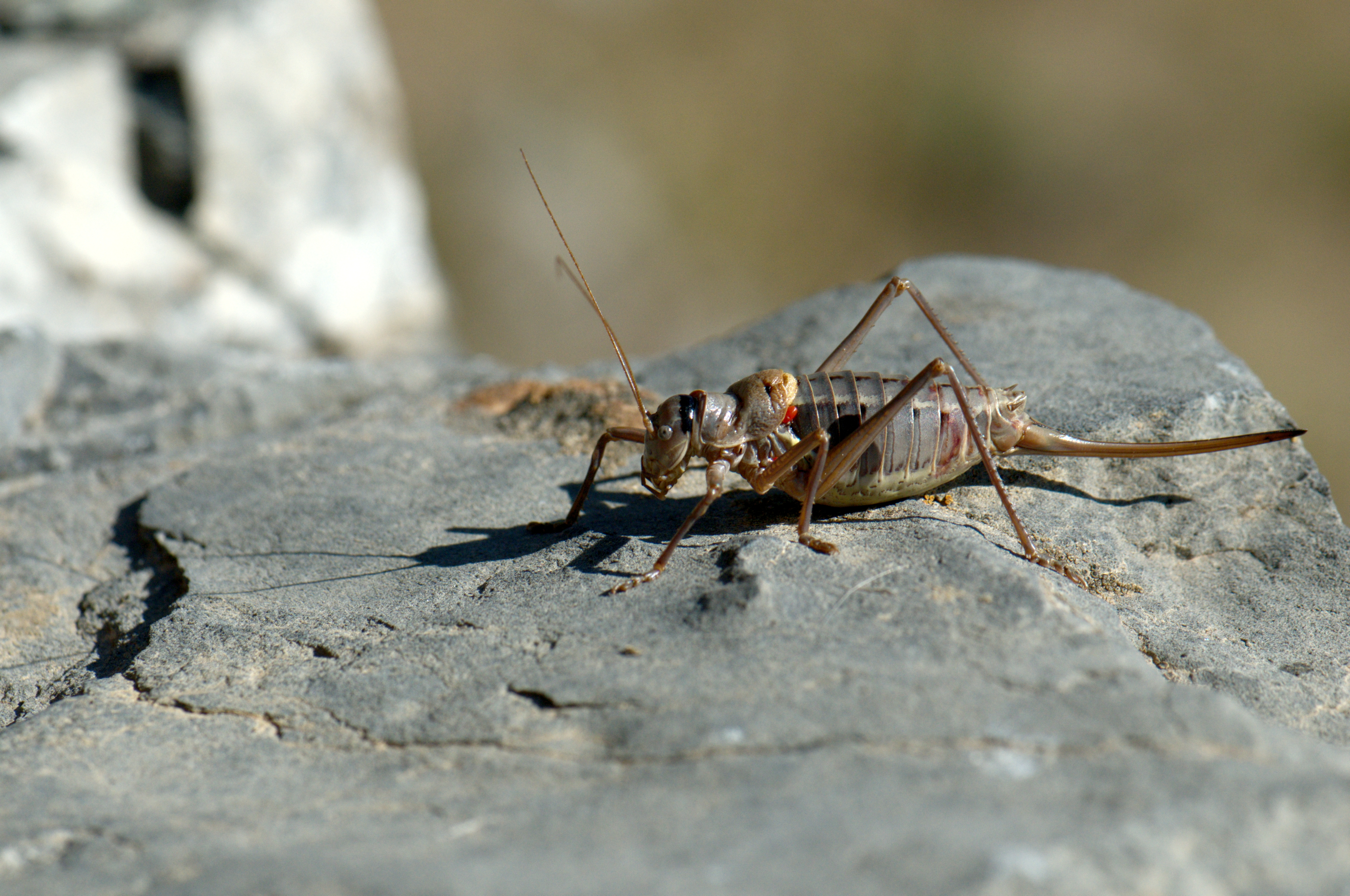
Ephippiger terrestris
