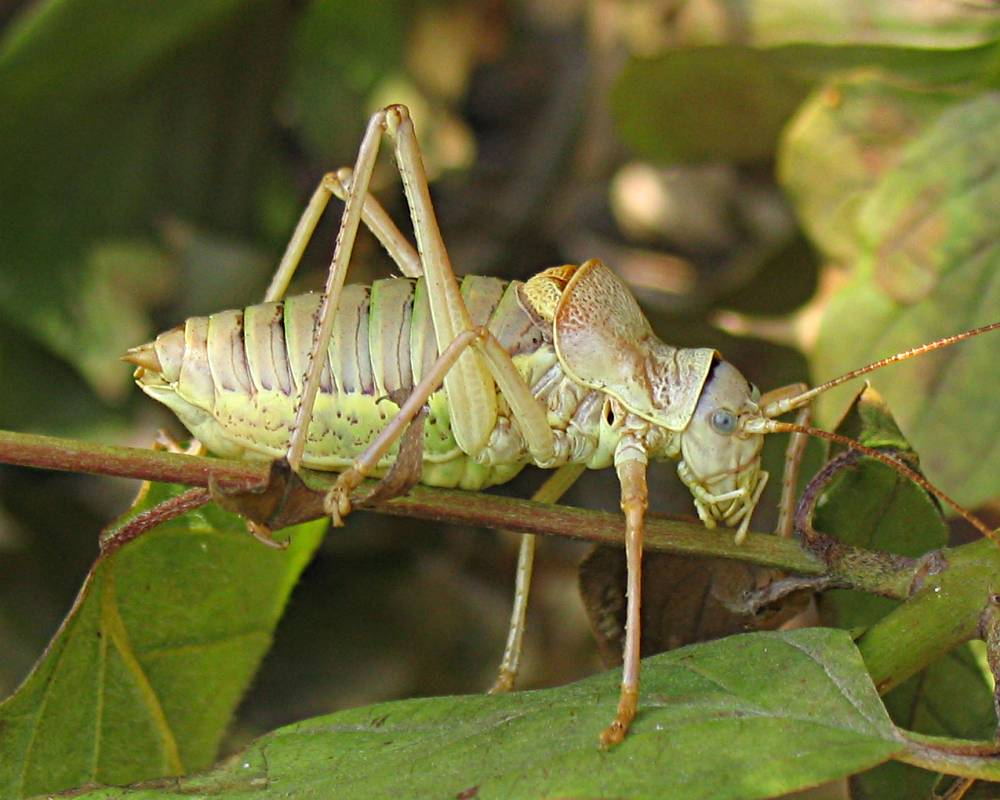
- Ephippiger ephippiger, Germany

Scientific classification
- Domain: Eukaryota
- Kingdom: Animalia
- Phylum: Arthropoda
- Class: Insecta
- Order: Orthoptera
- Suborder: Ensifera
- Family: Tettigoniidae
- Genus: Ephippiger
- Species: E. ephippiger

Binomial name
- Ephippiger ephippiger (Fiebig, 1784)

Synonyms
- Gryllus ephippiger Fiebig, 1784; Ephippigera [sic] vitium Serville, 1831; Ephippigera [sic] fabricii Fieber, 1853; Ephippiger fibigii Fieber, 1853; Ephippiger ephippiger mischtschenkoi Harz, 1966; Ephippiger ephippiger harzi Adamovic, 1973; Ephippiger ephippiger usi Adamovic, 1973; Ephippiger ephippiger balkanicus Andreeva, 1985; Ephippiger ephippiger varnensis Andreeva, 1985

= Ephippiger ephippiger =

Species of cricket-like animal

Ephippiger ephippiger, the saddle-backed bush cricket, is a species belonging to the family Tettigoniidae subfamily Bradyporinae. It is found primarily in central Europe, with the closely related species Ephippiger diurnus in the west. The habitat consists of relatively dry and sparse areas with scarce vegetation, such as heather with a few trees, where it can be found both close to the soil and higher up in the vegetation. The saddle-backed bush cricket mainly eats insects and other small animals, but also plant parts. For arable farmers, it is a useful animal because it lives in plants but mainly hunts for plant-dwelling (pest) insects. It is active during the months of August to October; the males are mainly heard between eleven o'clock in the morning and nine o'clock in the evening. The sound is clearly audible and consists of a sharp, grating squeak that sounds like tieh, but is repeated in long runs with a frequency of about one or two times per second.

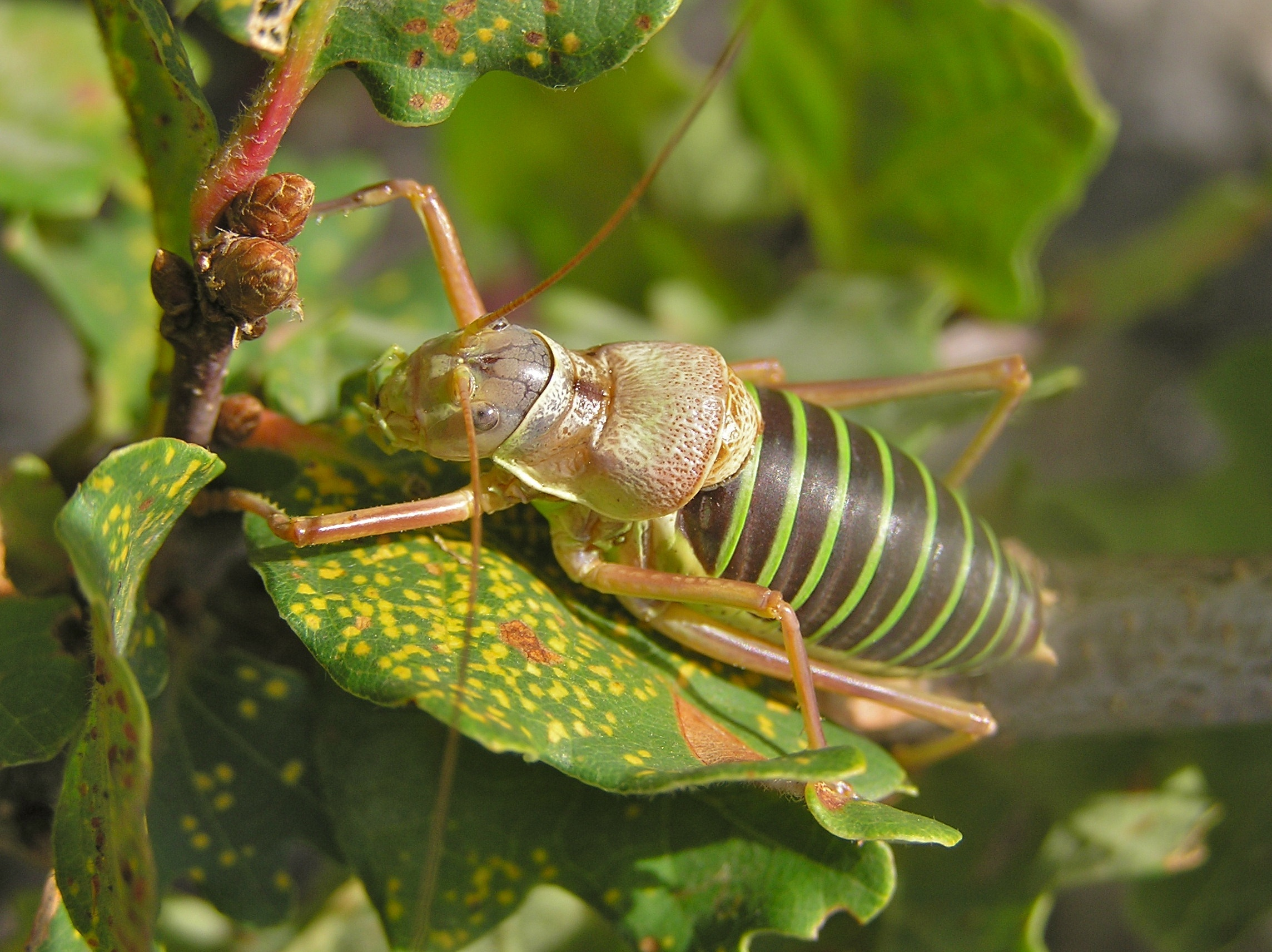
Male

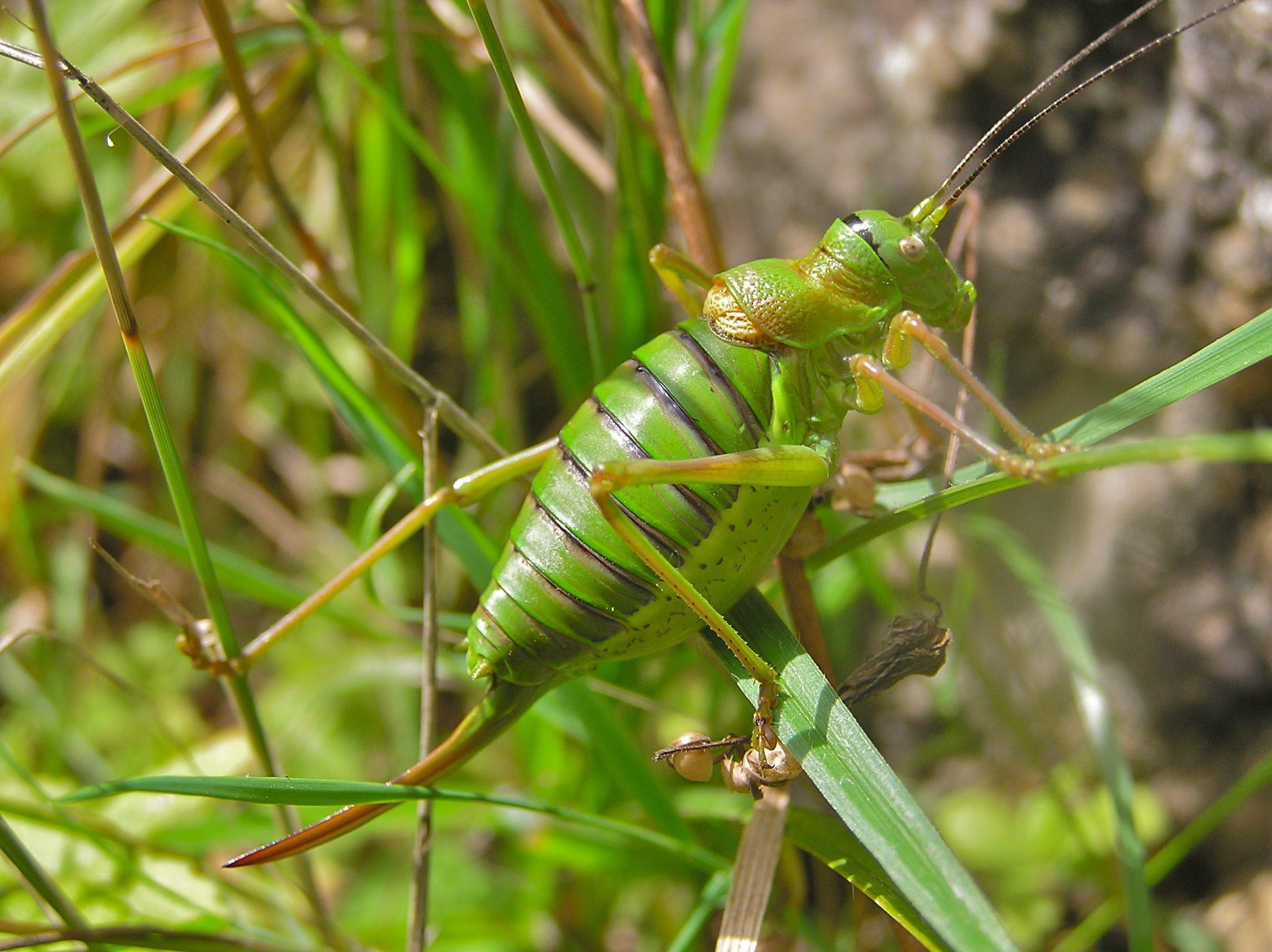
Female

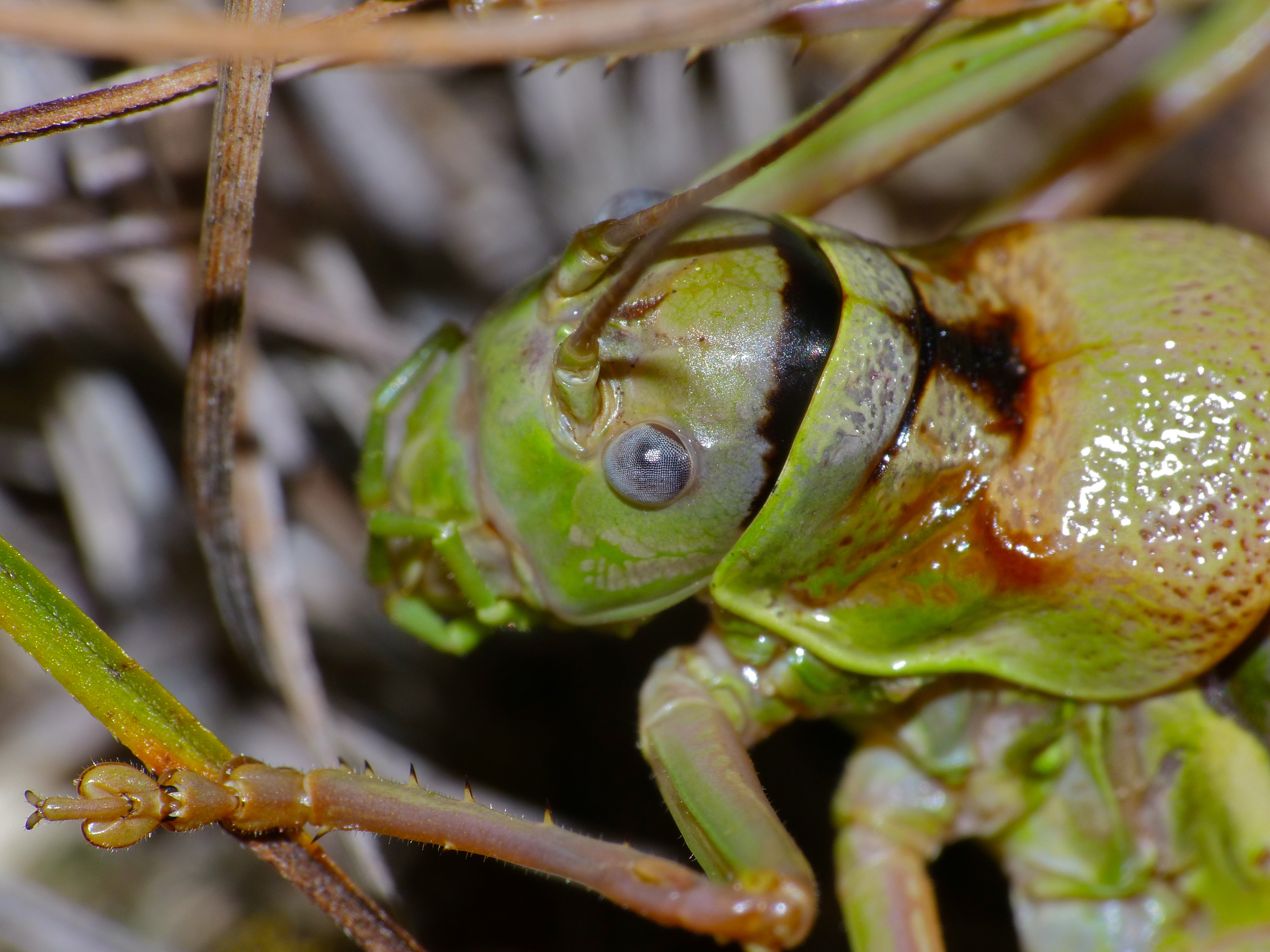
Head

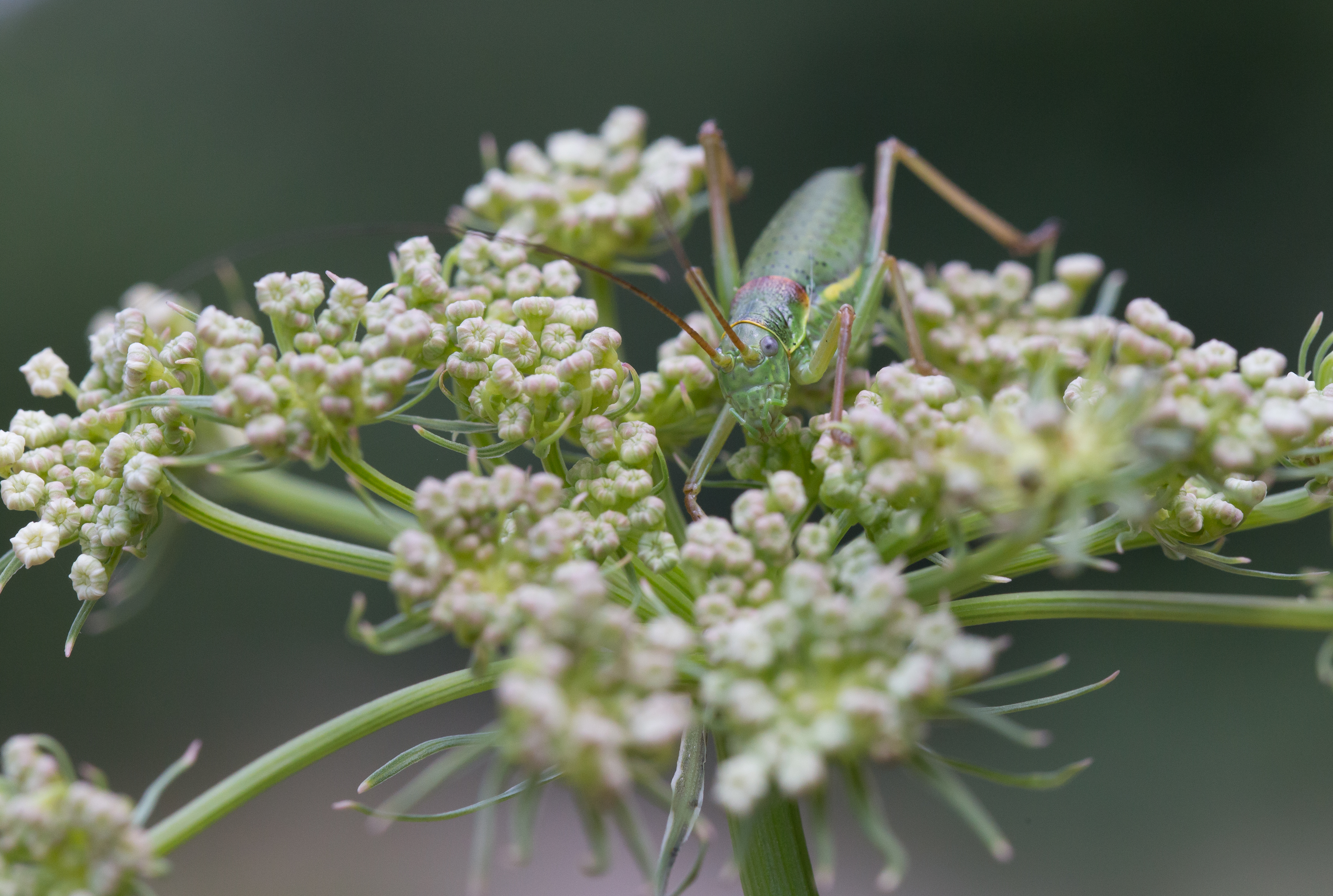
Feeding

Close-Up of a Ephippiger ephippiger
