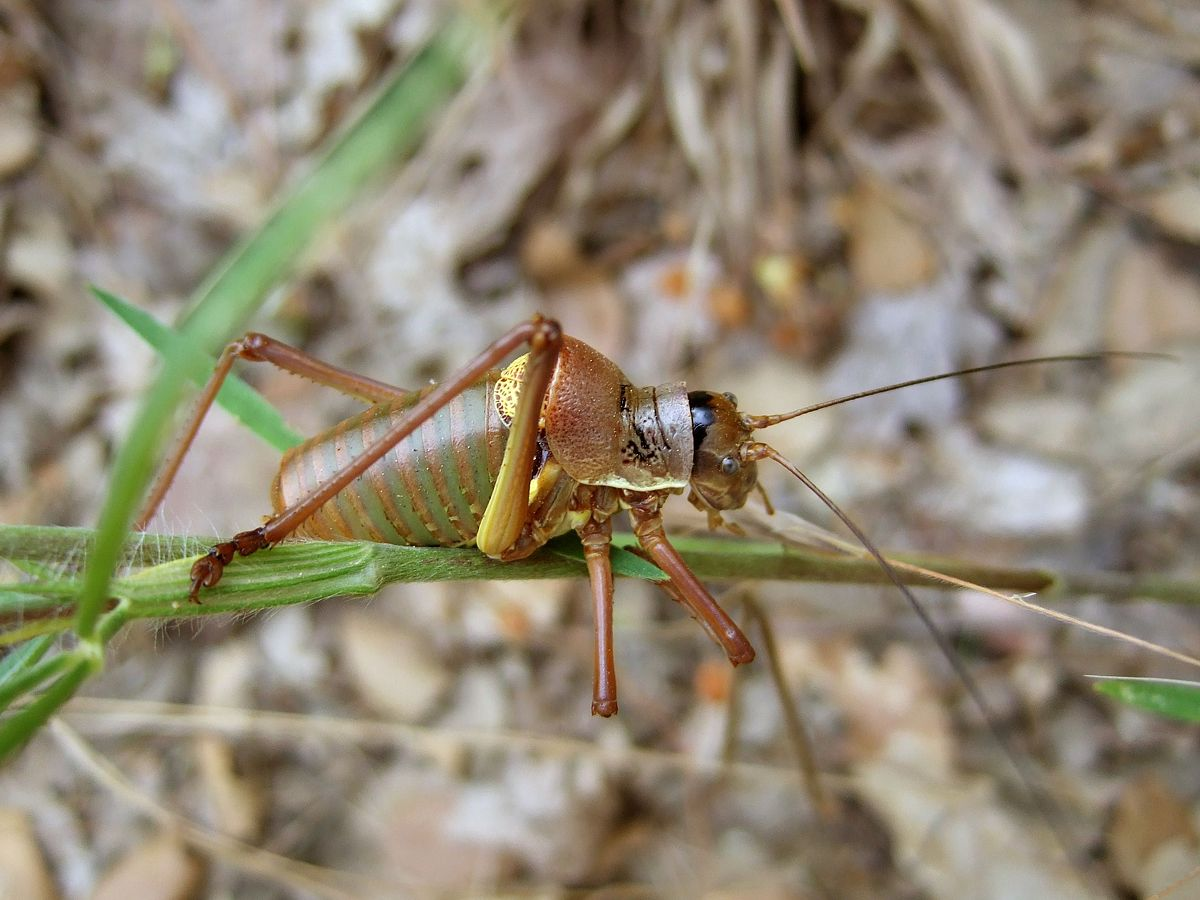

Scientific classification
- Kingdom: Animalia
- Phylum: Arthropoda
- Clade: Pancrustacea
- Class: Insecta
- Order: Orthoptera
- Suborder: Ensifera
- Family: Tettigoniidae
- Genus: Ephippiger
- Species: E. provincialis

Binomial name
- Ephippiger provincialis (Yersin, 1854)

= Ephippiger provincialis =

Species of cricket-like animal

Ephippiger provincialis, the Provence saddle-backed bush cricket, is a species in the family Tettigoniidae.

== Description ==
Specimens of this species reach a body length of 28–41 millimetres (1.1–1.6 in). The body is light brown or reddish colored, very rarely green. The very short and wide cerci of the males have a tooth inside that is equally long and wide like the tooth at the end. All other species of the tribe Ephippigerini have a much smaller such tooth. The nearly straight Ovipositor is rarely shorter than 25 millimeters.

== Distribution ==
Ephippiger provincialis is endemic to southern France. It occurs between Saint-Tropez and Marseille.

== Mode of life ==
The specimens sit usually on the ground or on low plants. Adult specimens can be found from June to August. Sometimes mass reproductions happen by this species.
