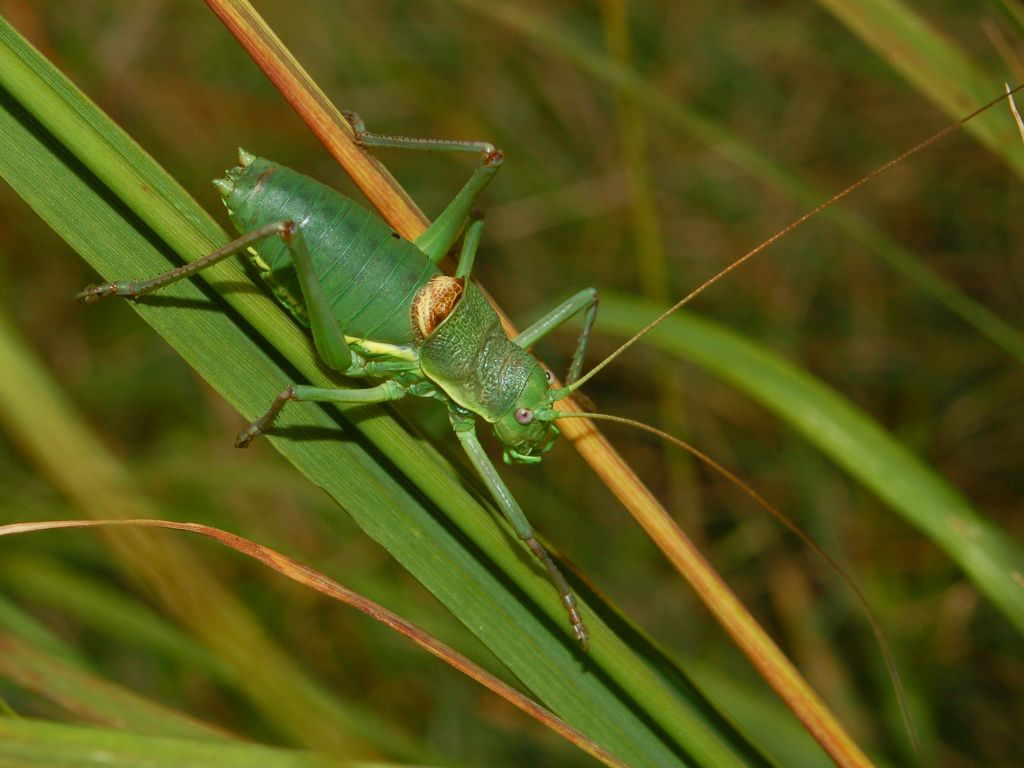
- Ephippiger perforatus, male
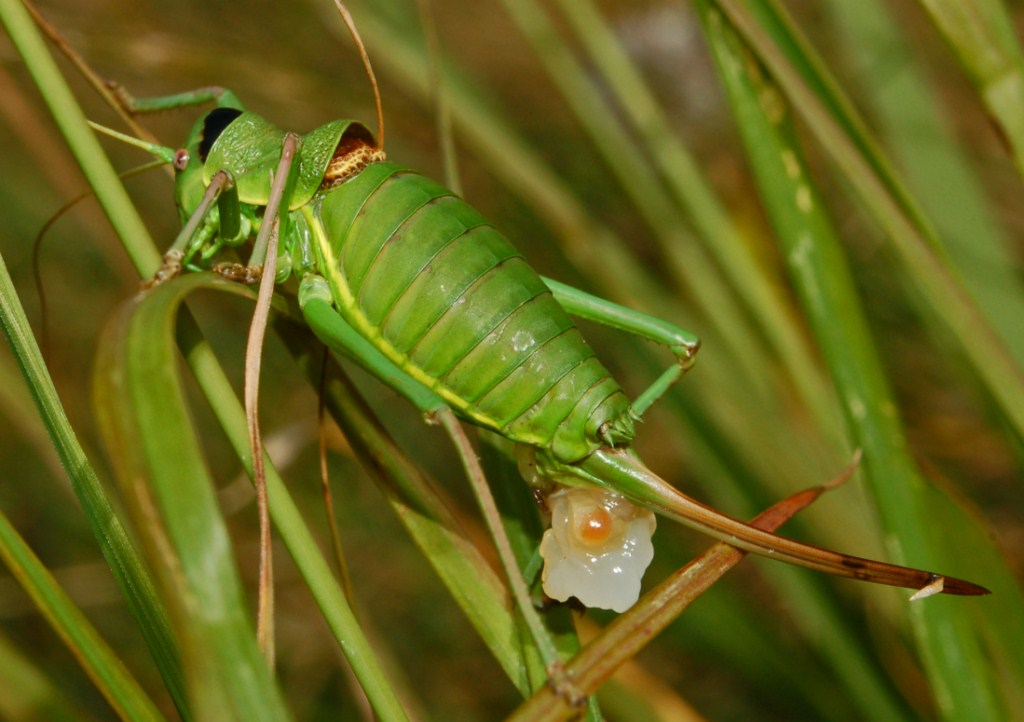
- Female with spermatophore

Scientific classification
- Domain: Eukaryota
- Kingdom: Animalia
- Phylum: Arthropoda
- Class: Insecta
- Order: Orthoptera
- Suborder: Ensifera
- Family: Tettigoniidae
- Genus: Ephippiger
- Species: E. perforatus

Binomial name
- Ephippiger perforatus (Rossius, 1790)

Synonyms
- Ephippigera perforata (Rossius, 1790); Ephippiger ephippiger perforatus (Rossius, 1790); Ephippiger perforata (Rossius, 1790); Locusta perforata Rossius, 1790

= Ephippiger perforatus =

Species of cricket-like animal

Ephippiger perforatus, the North Apennine saddle bush-cricket, is a species of insect in the family Tettigoniidae.

== Distribution ==
Ephippiger perforatus is endemic to Italy. This species occurs from the Northwest to the Southern Itay, but in the southern part of its range it is much rarer and seems to be declining.

== Habitat ==
These large bush-crickets inhabit shrubs and bushes and from the coasts to the mountains at an elevation of 50–1,500 metres (160–4,920 ft) above sea level.

== Description ==
Ephippiger perforatus can reach a body length of 23–28 millimetres (0.91–1.10 in) in males, of 23–31 millimetres (0.91–1.22 in) in females. The ovipositor reach about 25–26 millimetres (0.98–1.02 in). The body of these bush-crickets is usually light green. The pronotum resembles a saddle. The atrophied wings are unfit to flight. The base of tegmina is brownish or blackish, with a yellowish outer margin.

== Bibliography ==
- Burr. 1907. Entomologist's Rec. J. Var. 19:299
- Dubrony (1878) Liste des Orthoptères recueillis jusqu'ici en Ligurie, Annali del Museo Civico di Storia Naturale 'Giacomo Doria', Genova (Ann. Mus. Civ. Stor. Nat. Genova) 12:5-23
- Rossius (1790), Fauna Etrusca 1
- Targioni-Tozzetti (1882), Ortotteri agrari cioè dei diversi insetti dell'ordine degli ortotteri nocivi o vantaggiosi all'agricoltura o all'economia domestica e principalmente delle cavallette, Annali di Agricoltura, Firenze, Bencini 238 pp., 68 figs.
- Massa, Fontana, Buzzetti, Kleukers & Odé. 2012. Fauna d'Italia. Orthoptera 48:295
