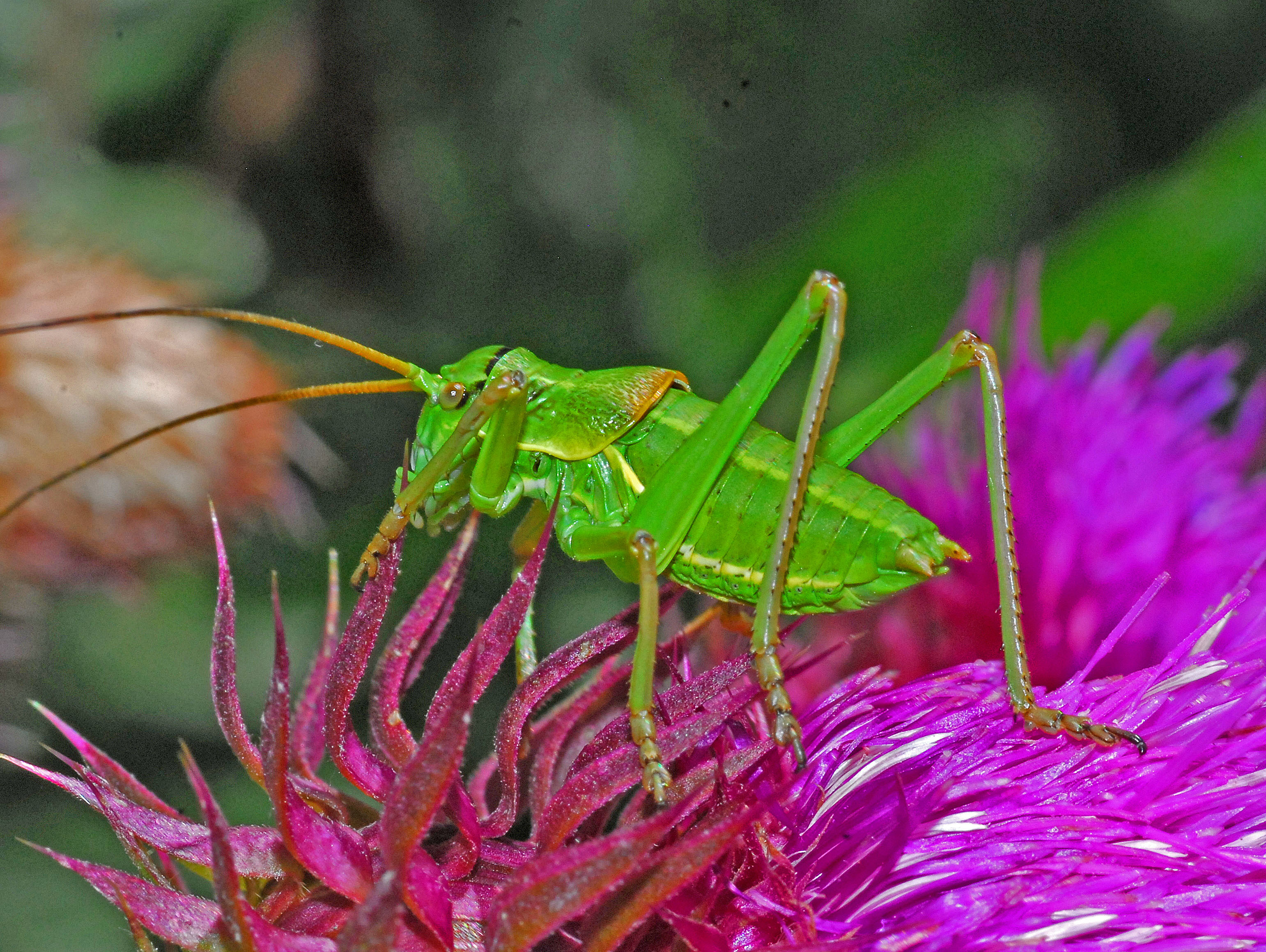
- Ephippiger terrestris bormansi. Male, side view
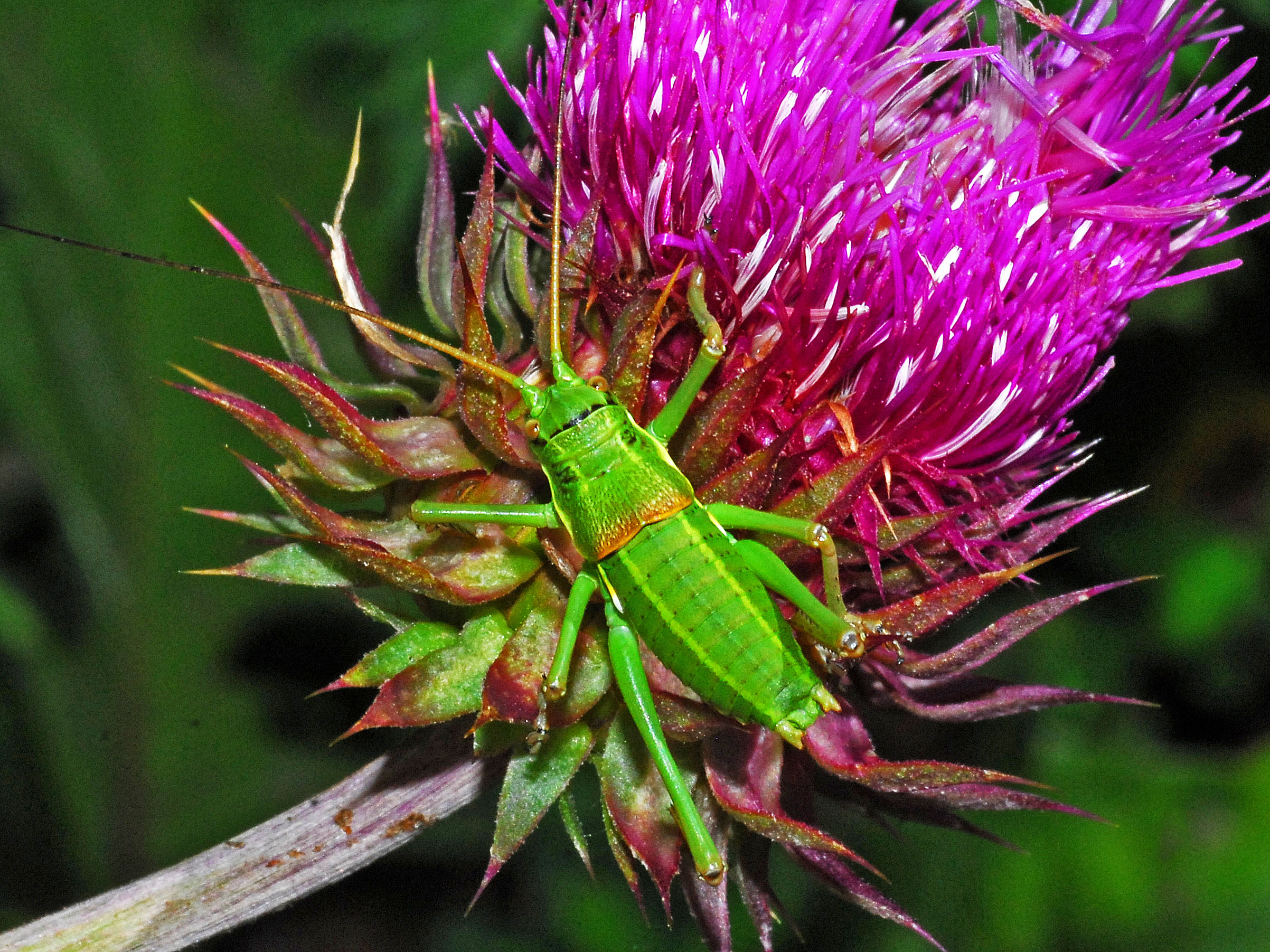
- Dorsal view

Conservation status
- Least Concern (IUCN 3.1)

Scientific classification
- Kingdom: Animalia
- Phylum: Arthropoda
- Clade: Pancrustacea
- Class: Insecta
- Order: Orthoptera
- Suborder: Ensifera
- Family: Tettigoniidae
- Genus: Ephippiger
- Species: E. terrestris

Binomial name
- Ephippiger terrestris Yersin, 1854

Synonyms
- Ephippigera terrestris Yersin, 1854

= Ephippiger terrestris =

Species of cricket-like animal

Close-up of Ephippiger terrestris

Ephippiger terrestris, common name Alpine saddle-backed bush-cricket, is a bush cricket species belonging to the family Tettigoniidae, subfamily Bradyporinae.

== Subspecies ==
Subspecies include:

- Ephippiger terrestris bormansi Brunner von Wattenwyl, 1882 (in Italy and Switzerland)
- Ephippiger terrestris caprai Nadig, 1980 (in Italy)
- Ephippiger terrestris terrestris Yersin, 1854

== Distribution ==
This species is present in Middle and Southwestern Europe (France, Italy and Switzerland). The subspecies E. terrestris bormansi occurs only in northern Italy and southern Switzerland.

== Habitat ==
This species occurs in warm mountain meadows and pastures, in open rocks and in dwarf shrubs, at an elevation of 1,000–2,000 metres (3,280–6,560 ft) above sea level.

== Description ==
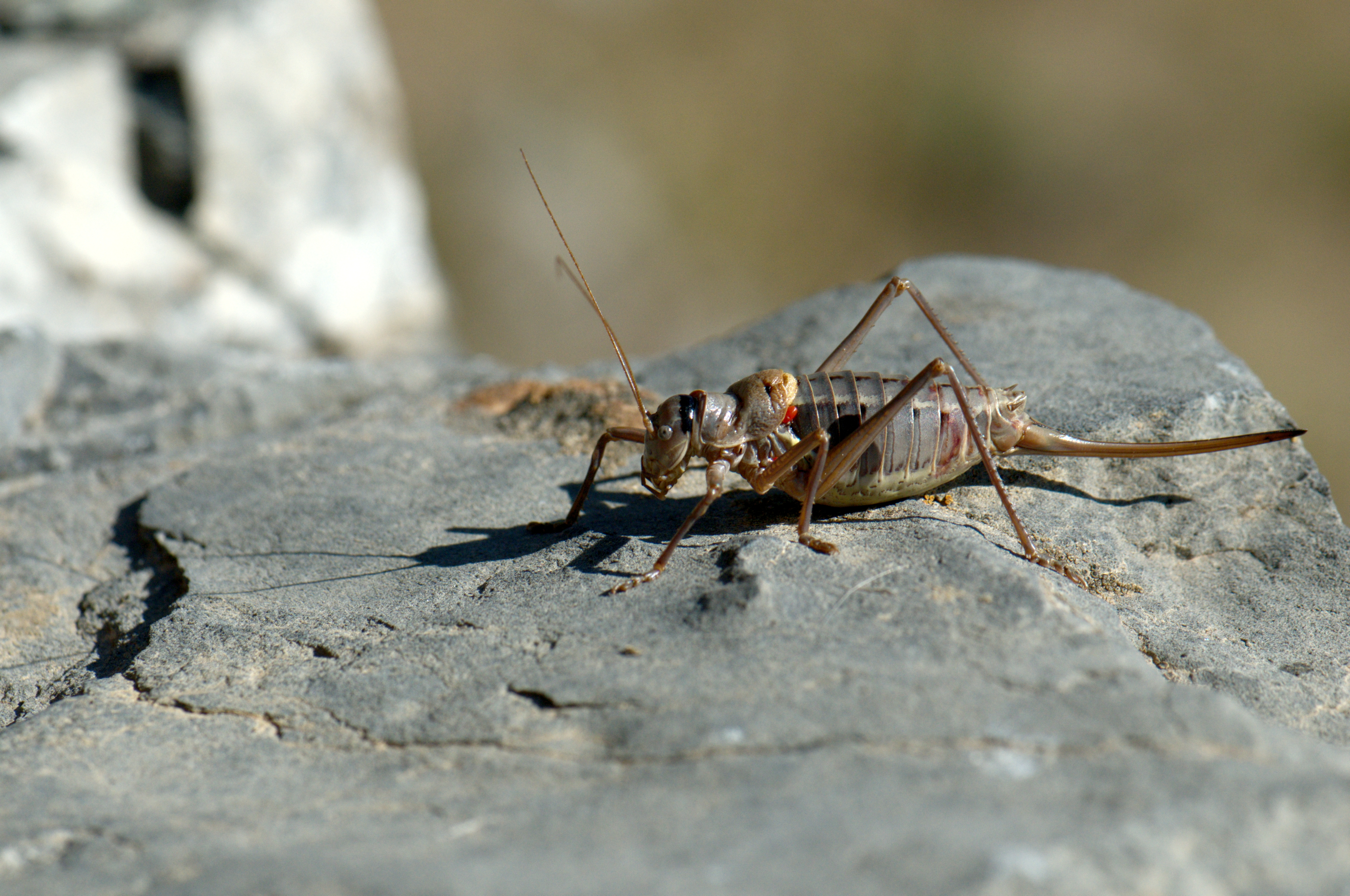
Ephippiger terrestris terrestris. Female

Ephippiger terrestris can reach a body length of about 23–28 mm (0.91–1.10 in) in males, of about 28–32 mm (1.1–1.3 in) in females, while ovipositor can reach about 25–28 mm (0.98–1.10 in).

These bush crickets are usually bluish-green. However, in both sexes the body color is quite variable and often olive-green, beige and sepia-brown color variations occur. A yellowish line runs from the lower edge of the pronotum to the abdomen end. Two bright longitudinal lines run along the back sides.

The back of the head is black. The form of the pronotum is rather smooth and gently concave and resembles a saddle (the Latin name ephippium means 'saddle of a horse'). They have round small atrophied wings, protruding a few millimeters below the pronotum, that are unfit to flight and only used for the emission of sounds (stridulation). In the females the ovipositor is long and slightly curved upwards. In the male cerci stand out clearly and are cylindrical and relatively long.

== Biology ==
Adults can be found from July to October. The larvae go through about 5 stages. These bush crickets are omnivorous. Both the male and the female can produce sounds, even if the female does so rarely and only in response to other males.

== Bibliography ==
- Eades D.C., Otte D., Cigliano M.M., Braun H., Orthoptera Species File.
- Bellmann & Luquet (1995), Guide des sauterelles, grillons et criquets d'Europe occidentale, Delachaux et Niestle, Lausanne 1-383 (in French)
- Fontana, La Greca & Kleukers. 2006. In Ruffo & Stoch. Checklist and distribution of the Italian fauna 2 17:137-139
- Massa, Fontana, Buzzetti, Kleukers & Odé. 2012. Fauna d'Italia. Orthoptera 48:302
- Yersin (1854), Bull. Soc. Vaudoise Sc. nat. 4
