= List of Padma Shri award recipients in social work =

Recipients of a civilian award in India

List of people awarded Padma Shri, the fourth-highest civilian order of India in the field of social work.

Padma Shri Awardees in Social Work
Year	Name	State
1955	Periyazhwar	Tamil Nadu
1955	Mary Clubwalla Jadhav	
1955	Zarina Currimbhoy	Maharashtra
1957	Thakkadu Jagadisan	Tamil Nadu
1962	Mother Teresa	West Bengal
1985	Ela Bhatt	Gujarat
1990	Anna Hazare	Maharashtra
1998	Shantha Sinha	Andhra Pradesh
2005	Hema Bharali	Assam
2006	Sudha Murty	Karnataka
2010	Anu Aga	Maharashtra
2010	Ayekpam Tomba Meetei	Manipur
2010	Baba Sewa Singh	Punjab
2010	Deep Joshi	Delhi
2010	J. R. Gangaramani	UAE
2010	Kranti Shah	Maharashtra
2010	Kurian John Melamparambil	Kerala
2010	Sudha Kaul	Delhi
2010	Sudhir M. Parikh	USA
2011	Anita Reddy	Karnataka
2011	Azad Moopen	UAE
2011	Jockin Arputham	Maharashtra
2011	Kanubhai Hasmukhbhai Tailor	Gujarat
2011	Mamang Dai	Arunachal Pradesh
2011	Martha Chen	USA
2011	Meena Sharma	Uttar Pradesh
2011	Nomita Chandy	Karnataka
2011	Sheela Patel	Maharashtra
2012	Binny Yanga	Arunachal Pradesh
2012	G. Muniratnam	Andhra Pradesh
2012	Niranjan Pranshankar Pandya	Maharashtra
2012	P. K. Gopal	Tamil Nadu
2012	Phoolbasan Bai Yadav	Chhattisgarh
2012	Reeta Devi	Delhi
2012	S. P. Varma	Jammu and Kashmir
2012	Shamshad Begum	Chhattisgarh
2012	Uma Tuli	Delhi
2013	Jaymala Shiledar	Maharashtra
2013	Jharna Dhara Chowdhury	Bangladesh
2013	Nileema Mishra	Maharashtra
2013	S. K. M. Maeilanandhan	Tamil Nadu
2014	Mathurbhai Savani	Gujarat
2014	Mukul Chandra Goswami	Assam
2014	Narendra Dabholkar	Maharashtra
2015	Ashok Bhagat	Jharkhand
2015	Bimla Poddar	Uttar Pradesh
2015	Janak Palta McGilligan	Madhya Pradesh
2015	Veerendra Raj Mehta	Delhi
2016	Arunachalam Muruganantham	Tamil Nadu
2016	Sunitha Krishnan	Andhra Pradesh
2017	Appasaheb Dharmadhikari	Maharashtra
2017	Anuradha Koirala	Nepal
2018	Arvind Gupta	Maharashtra
2018	Damodar Ganesh Bapat	Chhattisgarh
2018	Lentina Ao Thakkar	Nagaland
2018	Rani & Abhay Bang	Maharashtra
2018	Sitavva Joddati	Karnataka
2018	Subhasini Mistry	West Bengal
2018	Sudhanshu Biswas	West Bengal
2020	Abdul Jabbar	Madhya Pradesh
2020	Himmat Ram Bhambhu	Rajasthan
2020	Jagdish Lal Ahuja	Punjab
2020	Javed Ahmad Tak	Jammu and Kashmir
2020	Mohammed Sharif	Uttar Pradesh
2020	Popatrao Baguji Pawar	Maharashtra
2020	Radha Mohan & Sabarmatee	Odisha
2020	S. Ramakrishnan	Tamil Nadu
2020	Satyanarayana Mundayoor	Arunachal Pradesh
2020	Usha Chaumar	Rajasthan
2020	Yogi Aeron	Uttarakhand
2021	Birubala Rabha	Assam
2021	Chutni Devi	Jharkhand
2021	Girish Prabhune	Maharashtra
2021	Lakhimi Baruah	Assam
2021	Parkash Kaur	Punjab
2021	Sangkhumi Bualchhuak	Mizoram
2021	Shyam Sunder Paliwal	Rajasthan
2021	Sindhutai Sapkal	Maharashtra
2021	Tsultrim Chonjor	Ladakh
2022	Basanti Devi	Uttarakhand
2022	Acharya Chandanaji	Bihar
2022	Gamit Ramilaben Raysingbhai	Gujarat
2022	Om Prakash Gandhi	Haryana
2022	Prem Singh	Punjab
2022	Shakuntala Choudhary	Assam
2022	Srimad Baba Balia	Odisha
2023	Bikram Bahadur Jamatia	Tripura
2023	Hirabai Lobi	Gujarat
2023	Ramkuiwangbe Jeme Newme	Assam
2023	Sankurathri Chandra Sekhar	Andhra Pradesh
2023	Tula Ram Upreti	Sikkim
2023	V. P. Appukutta Poduval	Kerala
2023	Vadivel Gopal & Masi Sadaiyan	Tamil Nadu
2024	Chami Murmu	Jharkhand
2024	Dukhu Majhi	West Bengal
2024	Gurvinder Singh	Haryana
2024	Jageshwar Yadav	Chhattisgarh
2024	K. S. Rajanna	Karnataka
2024	Maya Tandon	Rajasthan
2024	Parbati Baruah	Assam
2024	Sangthankima	Mizoram
2024	Sano Vamuzo	Nagaland
2024	Shankarbaba Pundlikrao Papalkar	Maharashtra
2024	Somanna	Karnataka
2025	Bhim Singh Bhavesh	Bihar
2025	Jumde Yomgam Gamlin	Arunachal Pradesh
2025	Libia Lobo Sardesai	Goa
2025	Sadhvi Ritambhara	Uttar Pradesh
2026	Anke Gowda	Karnataka
2026	Brij Lal Bhat	Jammu and Kashmir
2026	Budhri Tati	Chhattisgarh
2026	Hally War	Meghalaya
2026	Inderjit Singh Sidhu	Chandigarh
2026	Janardhan Bapurao Bothe	Maharashtra
2026	Khem Raj Sundriyal	Haryana
2026	Mohan Nagar	Madhya Pradesh
2026	Nilesh Vinodchandra Mandlewala	Gujarat
2026	S. G. Susheelamma	Karnataka
2026	Swami Brahmdev Ji Maharaj	Rajasthan
2026	Techi Gubin	Arunachal Pradesh
