= Irula Snake Catchers' Industrial Cooperative Society =

Indian cooperative society of tribal snake handlers

- Formation: 1978
- Founder: Romulus Whitaker
- Type: Cooperative
- Purpose: Snake venom extraction for antivenom production, providing livelihood to the Irula community
- Headquarters: Madras Crocodile Bank Trust, Chengalpattu district, Tamil Nadu, India
- Coordinates: 12.743887°N 80.238734°E
- Region served: India
- Members: ~350 members of the Irula community
- Website: https://irulasnakecatchers.com

The Irula Snake Catchers' Industrial Cooperative Society (abbr. ISCICS), also known as Irula Cooperative Society, is an Indian cooperative society of tribal snake handlers based in Tamil Nadu. It was founded in 1978 by herpetologist and conservationist Romulus Whitaker to provide a sustainable livelihood for the Irula people, a Scheduled Tribe of Tamil Nadu, known for their traditional skills in catching snakes for the production of life-saving antivenom. The cooperative is the largest producer of snake venom in India, supplying a significant portion of the raw material needed to manufacture antivenom for the country's most medically significant venomous snakes, Big Four, such as the Indian cobra, Russell's viper, and Echis.

The co-op, where members are all Irula people, is located on the campus of the Madras Crocodile Bank Trust, a reptile zoo and herpetology research station located near Chennai. It is recognised as a successful cooperative model for the sustainable use of natural resources and for its role in both public health and the economic empowerment of a marginalised community. Two of its members, Masi Sadaiyan and Vadivel Gopal, were awarded the Padma Shri, India's fourth-highest civilian award, in 2023 for their social work recognising their expertise and conservation efforts.

== History ==
The Irula people have a long history of coexisting with snakes and possess extensive traditional knowledge of the local fauna. They're known as the "snake society" or "snake-charming community" for their snake catching skills. Irula people have made their living for generations by hunting snakes for their skins, which is used by the leather industry to manufacture exotic snake leather, often used for fashion accessories such as handbags and wallets. This trade formed a significant part of their income. However, the enactment of the Wildlife Protection Act, 1972 in India banned the hunting of several animals, including snakes, and a subsequent ban on the export of snake skins in 1976 left the Irula community without their primary source of livelihood. This led to significant and sudden economic hardship and poverty within the community.

Romulus Whitaker, a herpetologist, proposed an alternative approach where the Irulas' expertise could be redirected towards a critical public health need: the production of antivenom. Snakebite is a major public health issue in India, with tens of thousands of deaths annually. With Whitaker's assistance, the society was established in 1978. It was founded to be owned, managed, and operated by the Irula community, ensuring that the profits would directly benefit its members. The cooperative was licensed by the government to capture a limited number of the four most venomous snake species ("Big Four") in the region—the spectacled cobra, the common krait, the Russell's viper, and the saw-scaled viper—for venom extraction. The unique mission of the society was to ensure that Irula tribal people can continue gainful employment and sustainably provide for themselves while ensuring that snakes are protected under the Wildlife Protection Act, 1972. This involves keeping the snakes in captivity for a limited period, extracting limited venom, and releasing them back into the wildlife.

== Operations ==
The cooperative's operations are centered on a sustainable and humane model of venom extraction. Members of the cooperative are licensed by the Forest Department and use their traditional tracking skills to locate and capture snakes in the wild, identifying them based on their tracks, smell and other signs in the environment. The cooperative operates under a quota system, which was originally set by the Madras High Court in 1994, allowing for the capture of a specific number of each of the four medically significant snake species annually.

Once captured, the snakes are brought to the cooperative's facility. They are housed in cool, earthen pots, which mimic their natural habitat, for a maximum of 21 days. During this period, venom is extracted from each snake up to four times. After the 21-day period and the final extraction, the snakes are marked with a small, harmless mark on their belly scales to prevent immediate recapture and are then released back into the wild in the same general area where they were caught. As a collective, they are allowed to bring in up to 13,000 snakes per year, and at any given time, a maximum of 800 venomous snakes can be housed.

The collected venom is then freeze-dried (lyophilized) to preserve its potency and sold to pharmaceutical laboratories across India. The Irula cooperative is a primary supplier for the seven major antivenom-producing companies in the country.

== Impact ==
The cooperative plays a crucial role in India's public health system. It is estimated to supply up to 80% of the venom required for the production of polyvalent antivenom in India, which is effective against bites from the "big four" venomous snakes—the Russell’s viper, the common krait, the Indian cobra, and the Indian saw-scaled viper. These snakes responsible for the majority of snakebite fatalities in the country, about 46,000 deaths per year according to a 2011 study. The consistent supply of high-quality venom from the cooperative has been instrumental in making antivenom more widely available and has saved thousands of lives. For the Irula community, the cooperative has provided a much-needed source of income, reversing the economic devastation caused by the ban on the snake skin trade. It has legitimized their traditional skills and provided a platform for their knowledge to be recognized and valued. The cooperative model ensures that the community members are direct beneficiaries of their work, with annual revenues reaching several crores of rupees in good years. The society has approximately 350 active members who earn a livelihood through its activities.

== Recognition ==
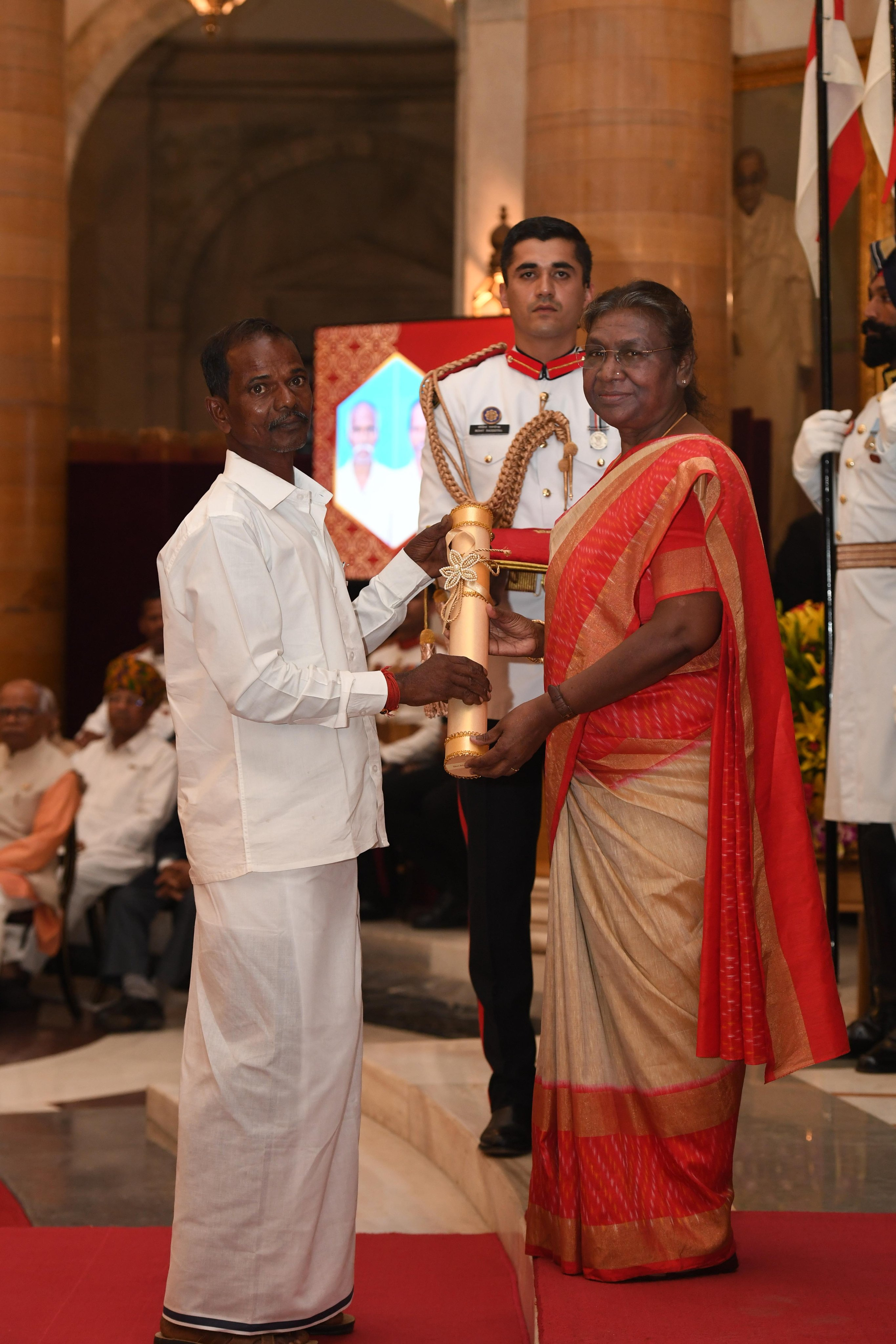
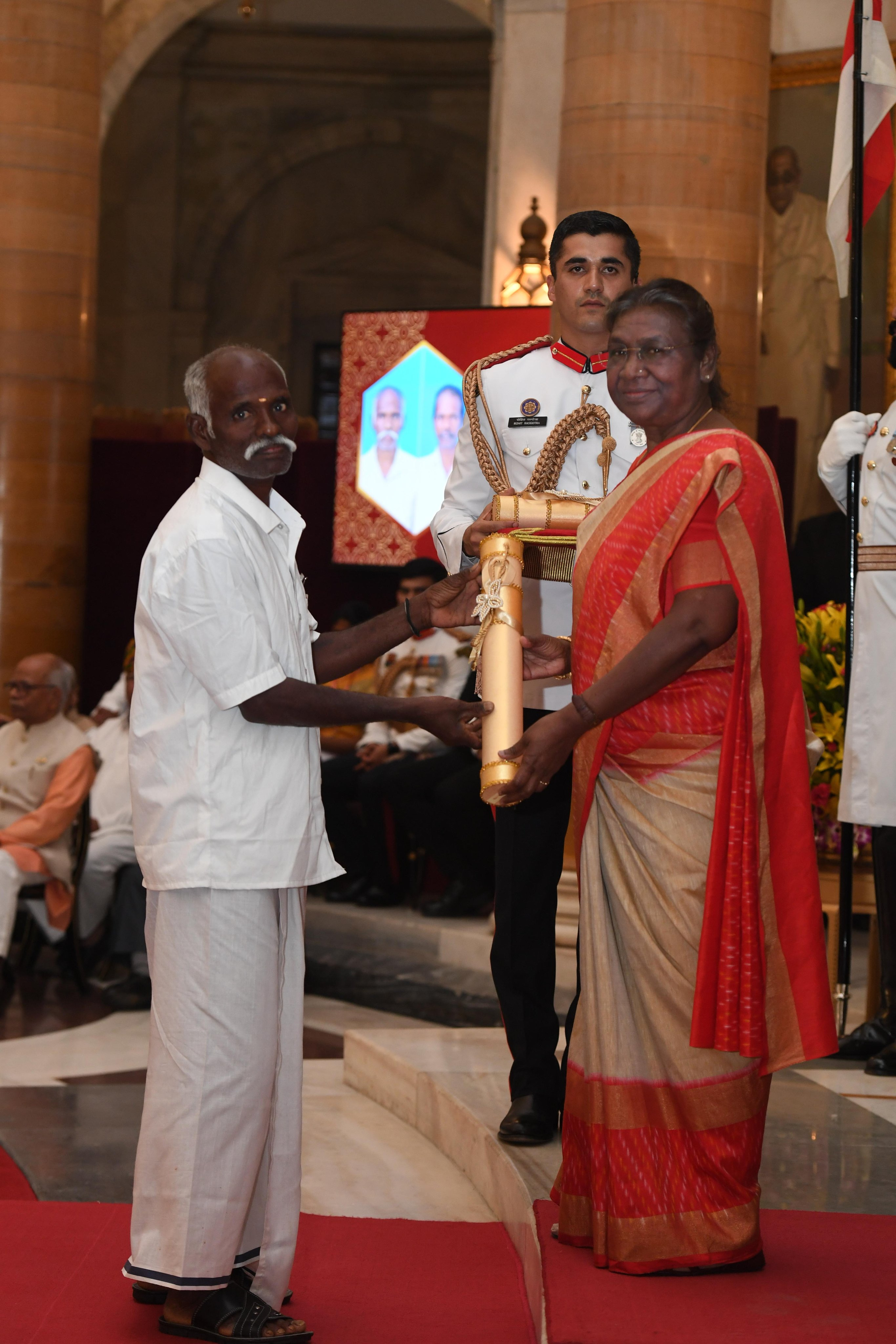
Masi Sadaiyan (left) and Vadivel Gopal (right) facilitated with Padma Shri by the President of India.

The expertise of the Irula snake catchers has gained international recognition. In 2017, two members of the cooperative, Masi Sadaiyan and Vadivel Gopal, were invited to Florida, United States, to help control the invasive population of Burmese pythons in the Everglades National Park. Their traditional methods proved highly effective, leading to the capture of dozens of pythons. The duo were subsequently awarded the Padma Shri in recognition of their impact.

== Challenges ==
Despite its success, the cooperative faces several challenges. The process of obtaining annual licenses and quotas for snake catching from the Tamil Nadu Forest Department can be subject to delays, which directly impacts the members' income and the supply of venom. In recent years, the permitted quota of snakes has often been lower than the original number set by the High Court, leading to significant drops in revenue and periods of financial hardship for the cooperative. Additionally, the traditional skill of snake tracking and handling is suffering from rise of automation and shift towards cruelty-free testing. The snake handling and venom extraction methods have also been criticised.

== See also ==
- Irula people
- Romulus Whitaker
- Madras Crocodile Bank Trust
- Snakebite
- Antivenom
- Wildlife Protection Act, 1972
