= Prem Singh =

Prem Singh may refer to:

- Prem Singh (Himachal Pradesh politician)
- Prem Singh (Fijian politician)
- Prem Singh (Delhi politician)
- Prem Singh (social worker)

It may also refer to:

- Prem Singh Tamang, also known as P.S. Golay, Sikkim politician
- Prem Singh Chandumajra (1950-), Punjabi politician
- Prem Singh Lalpur (1925-2011), Punjabi politician
- Prem Singh Brahma, former leader of the Bodo Liberation Tigers Force
- Prem Singh Labana, social and religious leader of the Labana Sihks
- Prem Singh Rana, Uttarakhand politician
- Prem Singh Dhami, Nepalese politician
