= Gamlin =

Gamlin is a surname. Notable people with the surname include:

- Herbert Gamlin, English rugby union player and cricketer
- Jarbom Gamlin, 6th Chief Minister of Arunachal Pradesh
- Jarkar Gamlin, Indian politician
- Jumde Yomgam Gamlin, Indian social worker
- Lionel Gamlin (1903–1967), British radio and newsreel broadcaster
- Shakuntala Gamlin, Indian Administrative Service officer
- Yngve Gamlin, Swedish actor

== Other ==
- Gamlin Cabin, Historic cabin in California
- Gamlin ministry, Arunachal state cabinet headed by Jarbom Gamlin
