= Piplantri =

- village
- Location in Rajasthan, India Piplantri (India)
- Coordinates: 25°06′40″N 73°47′20″E
- Country: India
- State: Rajasthan
- District: Rajsamand district

Languages
  - Official: Hindi
- Time zone: UTC+5:30 (IST)
- PIN: 313324
- ISO 3166 code: RJ-IN
- Nearest city: Rajsamand

Piplantri a village located in Rajsamand district in Rajasthan State, India.

== Notability ==
The villagers of Piplantri plant 111 trees every time a girl child is born and the community ensures these trees survive, attaining fruition as the girls grow up. India has a huge deficit of girls because society is obsessed with the male child and girls are considered financial burdens because of the dowry practices. Over the years, people here have managed to plant over 300,000 trees on the village's grazing commons. Trees planted include neem, sheesham, mango and amla.

To ensure financial security, after the birth of a girl, the villagers contribute Rs 21,000 collectively and take Rs 10,000 from the parents and put it in a fixed deposit bank account, which can be used only after she turns 18. To make sure that the girl child receives a proper education, the villagers make the parents sign a legal contract. Shyam Sunder Paliwal, the former sarpanch, started this initiative in memory of his daughter Kiran, who died in 2006.

The initiative that began in 2006 has turned Piplantri village into an oasis. The birth of a girl is now welcomed. The planting of trees has led to a higher groundwater level and richer wildlife.

The initiative has also helped the town’s economy. To keep termites away from the trees, many of which bear fruit, the village has planted more than 2.5 million Aloe vera plants around them. Gradually, the villagers realized that Aloe vera could be processed and marketed in a variety of ways. The community now produces and markets aloe-based products like juice and gel, among other things.
