= Disable Welfare Trust of India =

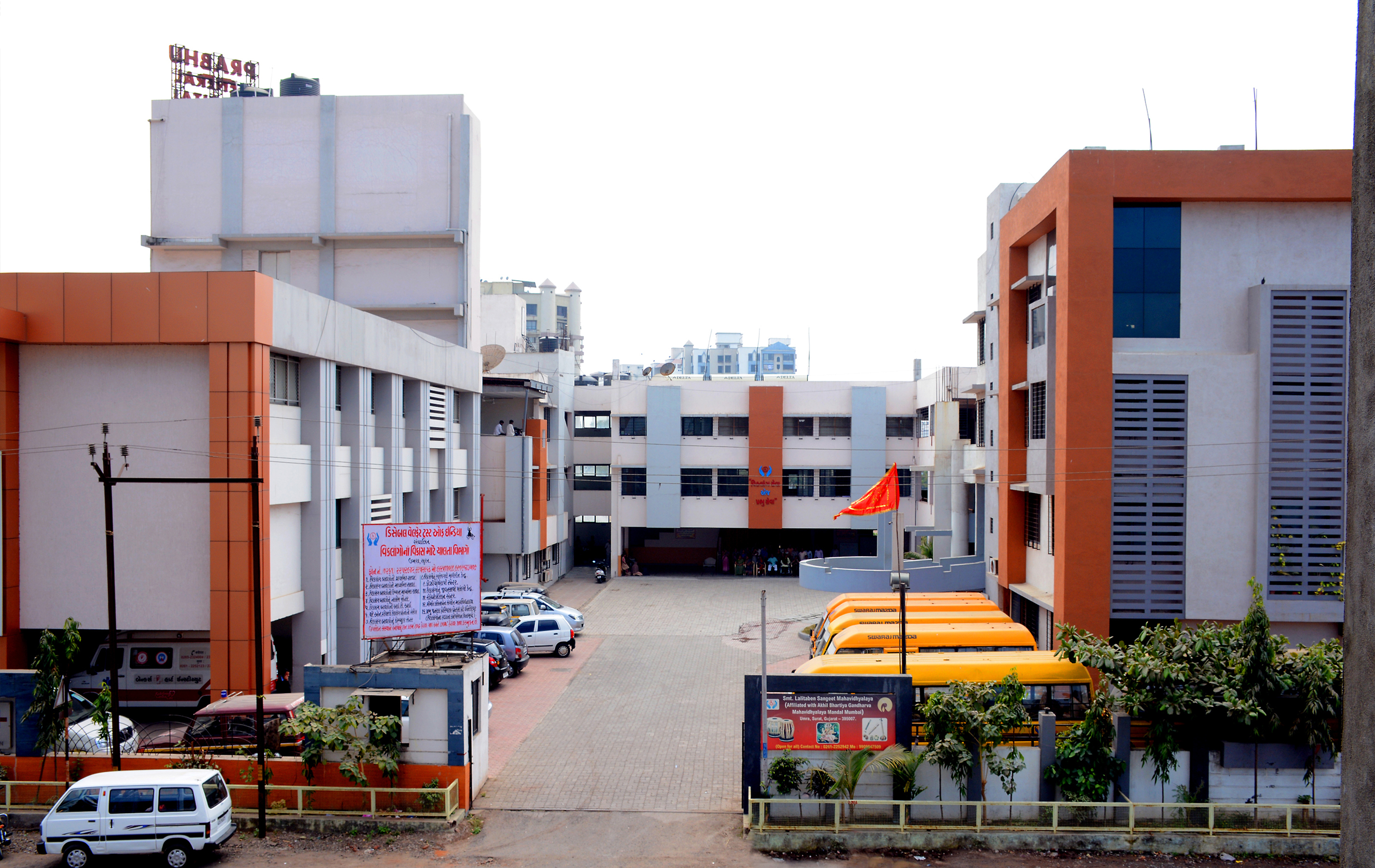
- Formation: 1991
- Type: Non governmental organisation (Registered Society)
- Legal status: Tax exempted
- Location: Surat
- Coordinates: 21.1030°N 72.4641°E
- Region served: Gujarat, India
- President: Kanubhai Hasmukhbhai Tailor
- Trustee: Rachana J.Pahadiwala
- Treasurer: Mohanbhai S.Nair
- Website: Official website

Disable Welfare Trust of India (DWTI) is an Indian non governmental organisation based in Surat, Gujarat, India, working in the areas of education, environment and the empowerment of women.

== Profile ==
The Disable Welfare Trust of India was formed in 1991 by Kanubhai Hasmukhbhai Tailor, a physically disabled person who had permanent disability to his legs due to poliomyelitis he contracted at the age of eleven. The primary aim of the organisation was to provide education and vocational training to the disabled children and work for their rehabilitation. The activities during the initial years were limited due to paucity of funds but Tailor conducted a survey where he identified 1280 disabled children. A chance meeting, in 1997, with the then Police Commissioner of Surat, P. C. Pande and S. R. Rao, the Municipal Commissioner, helped the trust to get 10 rooms in a primary school. Here, Kanubhai started a school, on 1 July 1957, with the financial assistance of ₹ 51,000 from Pande. Starting with four children, the trust grew to a student strength of 118 by the year end, and provided free transportation, educational aids, lunch and physiotherapy treatment to them.

In 2000, the school moved to a larger facility with 18 rooms given by the Municipal corporation at Khatodara, Surat and the student strength grew to 400. Later, on a free land measuring 4500 square yards, a new facility was constructed in 2006, the foundation stone laid by the then Vice President of India, Bhairon Singh Shekhawat and the construction completed with the assistance of Reliance Industries and Larsen and Toubro. The trust claims that the project is a success with many students going on to complete various professional degrees in management, engineering and medicine.

The Trust is constructing a new facility to accommodate 1000 children and has plans to set up a hospital for corrective surgeries for disabilities. It also has a scheme to guide physically disabled people from the villages for availing loans, from ₹ 150,000 to ₹ 500,000 for setting up own businesses from the Handicapped Finance and Development Corporation, a government run institution.

The main source of funding is through donations for which the government has extended tax exemption facility.

== See also ==
- Kanubhai Hasmukhbhai Tailor
