= Masi Sadaiyan =

Indian snake expert

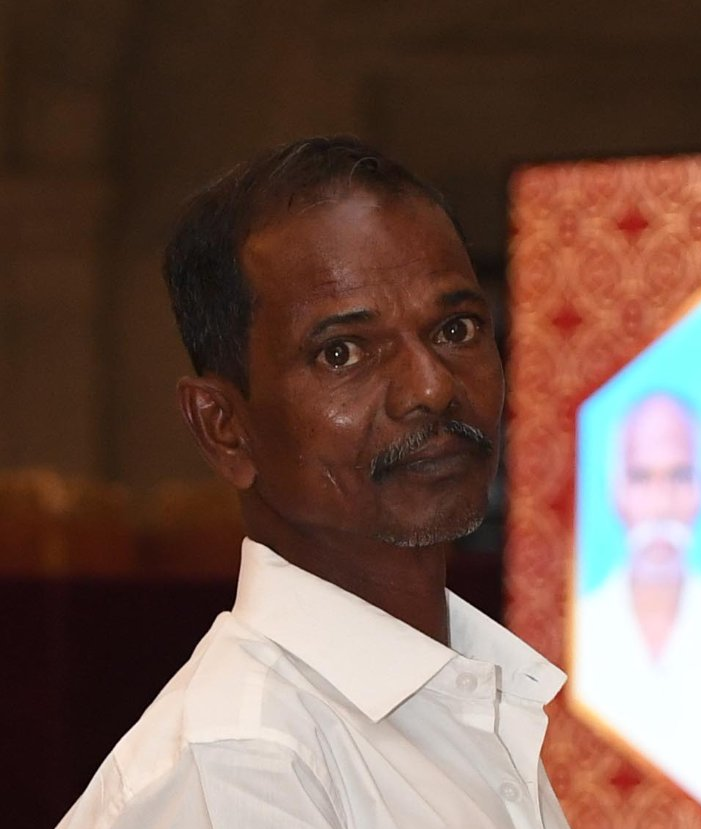
- Occupation: Snake catcher
- Known for: Traditional snake catching for antivenom production
- Awards: Padma Shri (2023)

Masi Sadaiyan is an Indian snake catcher from the Irula tribe of Tamil Nadu. He is an expert in the traditional methods of tracking and capturing venomous snakes, useful for production of snakebite antivenom. In 2023, he and his colleague Vadivel Gopal were jointly awarded the Padma Shri, India's fourth-highest civilian award, in recognition of their contributions to social work and affordable healthcare.

Sadaiyan is a member of the Irula Snake Catchers' Industrial Cooperative Society, which is the largest producer of snake venom in India. His method relies on traditional knowledge and understanding of snake behavior, inherited through generations of the Irula community, allows him to work without modern equipment.

In 2017, Sadaiyan traveled to Florida to assist state wildlife agencies by training them to track and capture invasive Burmese pythons in the Everglades.

== See also ==
- Vadivel Gopal
- Romulus Whitaker
- Irula people
