= Eklavya foundation =

Eklavya is an Indian NGO based in Bhopal, Madhya Pradesh working in the field of education.

== History ==
The organisation traces the beginning of their educational programmes to an earlier programme called Kishor Bharati established in the Narmadapuram district (previous official name is Hoshangabad) of Madhya Pradesh. And popularly called the Hoshangabad Experiment or the Hoshangabad Science Teaching Programme (HSTP). This education programme professed to contest many of the traditional ways of teaching sciences in schools, emphasising instead on experiments. They believed in and promoted the educational practice of learning by doing. The Indian writer Arvind Gupta participated in this experiment.

=== Kishore Bharti ===
Kishore Bharti was set up by Anil Sadgopal while he was at Tata Institute of Fundamental Research (TIFR) as a Fellow. He resigned in 1972 to set up Kishore Bharati near Paliya Pipariya village of Bankhedi block in Narmadapuram district in Madhya Pradesh. Organisation was meant to focus on a number of initiatives related to economic development activities. But within the first year, it also took up an initiative to work on science education at school level in collaboration with other organizations, that led to Hoshangabad Science Teaching Program (HSTP)

=== Hoshangabad Science Teaching Programme (HSTP) ===
HSTP can be traced back to 1972 when a group of people consisting of scientists, engineers, educationists and social activists from two voluntary organizations Kishore Bharti and Friends Rural Center decided to implement on ground, an innovative and interactive model of school science teaching which till then remained on papers as part of policy directives. The primary objective of HSTP was to determine the extent to which the existing system of government schooling could accommodate the innovative changes for teaching science. HSTP thus was introduced in village schools to investigate whether it would be feasible to introduce the ‘discovery’ approach to learning science in place of the traditional textbook-centred ‘learning by rote' methodology. In course of time, the concept of environment-based education was included as an integral part of science teaching. The idea behind HSTP was that experimental and field based study would help them to develop an inquisitive attitude. The academics in the program were advised by scientists, educators and research students from other institutes. The initial push for breaking the inertia was given by the groups from the All India Science Teacher Association (Physics study group) and Tata Institute of Fundamental Research (TIFR).They were joined in 1973 by a group from the University of Delhi which went on to take academic responsibility for the programme. IIT's, National Universities, Post Graduate colleges and various other institutes of national importance further contributed to the growth of HSTP. The curriculum was developed in collaboration between the university faculty and school science teachers.

=== Social Science Programme ===
Eklavya started its social science program in 1986 as an experimental project in 8 schools in the Dewas, erstwhile Hoshanagabad Narmadapuram and Harda districts of Madhya Pradesh. The program's primary objective was to strengthen pupils' conceptual analysis of social science and to simultaneously develop the ability to critically view the social processes and realities around them. As a part of this programme children were seen as active participants in class-room dialogues and transactions wherein ample room was given to include their views and experiences. Children were taught the skills of comparing and assessing the information given to them so that they would understand the differences between the realities of their time and place with the realities of another time and place. The curriculum was based on two central themes of changing dynamics of society and continuity. The programme aimed at making students realise that the change in society was the result of the interests and roles of different sections of the society as they evolved over time.

=== Prashika ===
This program started in 1983 and a curriculum was developed for Class I to Class V based on inferences from social, linguistic and mathematical surveys and field tests conducted in field area. The curriculum focused on various aspects of education like child development, language learning, mathematical abilities, etc. and was phased in a sequential manner on a hierarchy derived from a Piagetian framework of development of logical and mathematical abilities. The programme also gave special emphasis on the socio-economic and cultural tradition of learner and the state of the schools. The pilot project was started in 1987 in 7 schools across Shahpura and Harda. This number further increased to 25 in 1989. The programme was formally inducted into a state programme under the District Primary Education Programme DPEP of Rajiv Gandhi Prathamik Shiksha Mission (RGPSM) of Madhya Pradesh in 1995. The learning from the trial was further used to develop RGPSM's Seekhna Sikhana curricular package for primary education. This was then followed by a single primary school curricular package for the entire state which stemmed from the Seekhna Sikhana package and this also helped in the development of a curriculum for the ‘alternative’ primary schools opened by the Madhya Pradesh government under the Education Guarantee Scheme (EGS). One can say that the ultimate objective of Prashika programme was achieved when the Seekhna Sikhana package was adopted in 2001. Thus, the Prashika was the first of Eklavya's programmes to complete the cycle from a micro-level pilot project (1986–92) to a macro-level programme implemented at a block level (1995-2001) that was eventually merged into the government school system (2000–01) at the state level. However the scope of this programme remained confined to the block as this programme was soon closed down by the state government. But that was not the end of Prashika as it laid foundation for two more similar programmes, the first was the establishment of Shiksha Protsahan Kendras (SPKs) in Shahpur block in 1999 and the second was the setting up of the Bhopal Education Resource Centre (BERC) in 2000. SPKs are centres which operate in rural areas especially in the tribal areas to improve the quality of education of first generation learners through activity based learning. This centre is being run by a community appointed facilitator and adopts the principles developed under PRASHIKA for math and language teaching. BERC is a resource centre in an urban setting for primary and pre-primary education. The main goal of BERC is to encourage primary schools to introduce various activities that would develop interest in reading, writing and expression skills in students, through the production of wall newspaper and renovation of their libraries. In the Makhan Nagar block of Narmadapuram a Basic Abilities Programme was started in some middle schools. Teachers participation was the backbone of this programme. In 2004 a new initiative was also started in Indore as part of the teacher development initiative of the Indore Teacher Resource Centre to improve the abilities of primary school teachers in language and mathematics.

== Current areas of work ==
Broadly their areas of work are: with schools and community. They are involved in educational programmes through publication and research. Their educational publications include textbooks for children up to class 5 on all subjects, and from class 6 to 8 on subjects as sciences and social sciences. They regularly conduct training for teachers to use their material in the school practices. Their periodical publications include:

- Chakmak, a magazine for children of the age group up to 14 in Hindi. (Chakmak is a stone that was used by light fire by tribals in central India).
- Shaikshik Sandharb, A bi-monthly publication for teachers and adult readers (available for free download).
- srote, a weekly science feature service
- Many other publications for children and teachers.

They are also involved in community activities as clubs for students; health programmes for adolescent girls etc.

=== Curriculum, Research and Material Development (CRMD) ===
Subject matter and pedagogy employed to teach these are the two important cornerstones which determine good quality education. This however has remained a challenge in Indian education. Eklavya has tried to address both these along with reforms in examination and teacher training from the mid 1980s to 2002. With the coming in of National Curriculum Framework (NCF 2005) (NCF (2005)), much stress has been put on the child and the local in the construction of knowledge. This has led to renewed efforts on text-books both at NCERT and SCERT level. Eklavya has partnered with NCERT and some SCERTs in such efforts. Our efforts on educational change are guided by the dynamism of the subject matter, social realities and pedagogy. The group is organised on the basis of three subject areas Science, Social Science and Mathematics.

==== Human Body ====
The Human Body module was started in 1986 at Dewas based on input from the community, teachers and students in developing a primary school health curriculum. The module primarily was tailor-made for the community in the sense that their health problems and the practices they follow were fully taken into account. Another feature of this programme was that adequate spaces were provided to incorporate women's voices on health. They discussed about the various social problems that affected their physical and emotional well-being. Another aspect of this programme was the development of a life-size human body which was used for demonstrations and better understanding of people on the various aspects of health. All these findings were finally cumulated into an adolescence education program which consisted of teacher training and workshops for all school students. A variety of topics such as reproductive health, nutrition, domestic violence, primary healthcare, alternative medicine, personality development and mental health were covered under this program. A set of posters was developed on human body with the labels of the name of the organ along with its functions. Today this has been developed into a flex chart called "Sharir Ki Tasweer". Further a series of booklets named "Tan Man Shrunkhla" or "Body Mind Series" was developed. This mainly focused on topics such as skin, digestion and nutrition, and on muscular-skeletal, respiratory, cardiovascular, urinary, reproductive, endocrine and immune systems. Forward integration of this program was done with the help of various workshops, research and publication.

==== Social Science Programme ====
Eklavya started its social science program in 1986 as an experimental project in 8 schools in Dewas, Hoshangabad, now Narmadapuram and Harda district of Madhya Pradesh. The primary objective of this program was to strengthen the conceptual analysis of social science and at the same time develop the ability to critically view the social processes and realities around them. As a part of this programme children were seen as active participants in class-room dialogues and transactions wherein ample room was given to include their views and experiences. Children were taught the skills of comparing and assessing the information given to them so that they would understand the differences between the realities of their time and place with the realities of another time and place. The curriculum was based on two central themes of changing dynamics of society and continuity. The programme aimed at making students realise that the change in society was the result of the interests and roles of different sections of the society as they evolved over time.

==== High School Science Programme ====
The main objective of this programme was to make learning of science as close to the learner as possible. For this purpose an entirely activity-based science curriculum - Bal Vaigyanik, for middle school was developed in the 70s. There was a need felt to extend this to beyond class 8 to include classes 9 and 10 as this was the period when children could learn everything possible about science as after class 10 they would choose different streams. When Eklavya started this work in 2007 the necessary momentum for this task was provided by the formulation of NCF (2005) and subsequent textbook writing exercise in 2005. Eklavya created a science curriculum with emphasis on classes 9 and 10. Bal Vaigyanik was working on developing specific skills among children – the ability to measure, tabulating the data in a meaningful manner, drawing inferences, generalizing, etc. The underlying assumption behind this was that it is not important for them to memorise all the content but to develop certain skills and understand certain key concepts necessary to make a foundation so that they can understand the world around them. Activity-based science curricula were first tried out in the US and UK, hence a lot of studies were carried out there to understand how children learn. An important finding that came out of this was children do not unquestioningly imbibe the lessons in the Science class-room, they process all the new information on the basis of what ideas they have already learnt. The curriculum was accordingly developed in a manner conducive to the learning of science by students. It was also felt that the nature of Science as a method of enquiry and the philosophy of Science should also be conveyed to the students. With these points in mind Eklavya's team started working. Some concepts which were felt to form the foundations of all modern Science were selected and it was decided to develop stand-alone material for each of these concepts / topics in the form of modules. The topics selected for the first round of work were – Light (Optics), Evolution, The Cell Theory, The Atomic Theory, Motion & Force, Heat & Temperature and Electricity.

==== Multilingual Programme ====
Multilingualism in education has gained momentum in the past two decades. Studies have established that multilingual learning leads to enhanced analytical skills, cognitive abilities, language proficiency and scholastic achievement in children. Language is also integrally related to thought and the identity of a person. Multilingualism and Multiculturalism are interrelated and its history and culture go a long way in developing the language better. It has been learnt that if a child is exposed to say four languages simultaneously, then the process of learning all four languages will be similar for the child. After two decades of working at developing proficiency levels in two major languages Hindi (regional) and English, it has now being understood that it is possible to learn new languages at the same time nurturing the home language. Therefore, this program aims at including multi lingual books, reading and reference material in the curriculum along with different activities and facilitating teacher proficiency in multi linguality. The team at Bhopal currently works with 6 schools (government, private, girls, community and informal / parallel teaching school) to observe the language usage in class transaction, to collect, document, analyze and decode resource material from class and communities the students live in and finally to reach a module in a multi lingual classroom.

==== Mathematics Programme ====
The target group for maths learning in Eklavya has been primary and upper primary students. The aim of curricular research and material development at Eklavya is to make learning of maths fun, meaningful and relevant to the students. Teaching and learning of maths has more often than not kept more students out of it than in it. Hence all efforts have been directed towards making mathematics more accessible to students in terms of real understanding and application of concepts. For this purpose both national and international works have been referred to. One of Eklavya's first engagement with primary school maths have been under the primary education project PRASHIKA. This project accommodated the socio-economic conditions and cultural traditions of learners. It sought to integrate mathematics and language learning, bringing them together through an exploration of the child's environment. Today, in context of the work already done, NCF (2005) and RTE 2009, the work of the mathematics team can be characterized under the following broad areas:

=== Organising an Urban Resource Centre in Bhopal ===
Eklavya has immense experience working in rural areas, however not much work has been undertaken in the urban areas. Hence it was decided that an Urban Resource Centre be set up in Bhopal. The primary objectives of this resource centre are (a) improve the quality of education in government schools (b) provide support to other organisations in the field of urban education for the poor (c) to research into multilingual education (d) to develop a resource space for teacher's library, workshop, seminars, etc. and (e) developing and conducting courses in teacher education.

=== Organising resource centres for children, teachers and the community ===
Community based learning centres (Shiksha Proshtna Kendras) have been set up by Eklavya in 5 districts of MP. (Betul, Harda, Narmadapuram, Dewas, and Ujjain). These centres provide an additional academic support to government school students. These centres also pave way for the community to get involved in the managing the education of their children and get acquainted with new educational ideas.

=== Collaborating for Curriculum Development and Teacher Education ===
Eklavya has been playing an active role in development of NCF(2005) and in the development of National Curriculum Framework for Teacher Education (NCFTE) (2009). It has also developed a model Ded syllabus based on it. Eklavya has also provided support to government of Chhattisgarh, Bihar, Rajasthan and Andhra Pradesh in their curriculum and text book development. Eklavya collaborated with TISS to conduct MA in elementary education programme.

=== Riyaaz Academy for Illustrators ===
It is an initiative which has been started by Eklavya in collaboration with Atanu Roy with the objective of nurturing and grooming the professional skills of students interested in illustration. Currently the academy offers a one-year certificate course in illustration.

==== Library Project ====
Initially 5 rural government schools each in five blocks were chosen where Eklavya staff would initiate library and creative activities and attempt to bring out a wall newspaper every fortnight in each school. This provided the initial experience of setting up the school library and next year the programme was focused in a few areas - about 200 books were selected and distributed among 28 middle schools of Ujjain rural block of Ujjain district and 22 schools of Makhan Nagar block of Narmadapuram district. This was done through a memorandum of understanding with the Madhya Pradesh State Education department. Books were selected that helped children relate with their own experiences and environment, promoted imagination, problem solving and decision making skills.

==== Siksha Protsahan Kendra (SPK) ====
Over the course of time the organisation has spread into other arenas of education. Eklavya had realised earlier on, that school based curricular programmes alone would not be enough and that they have to be reinforced with out-of-school support programmes. This led to initiatives in setting up children clubs at the local level around library activities, theatre, discussion forums etc. From 2007 onwards, our focus was on involving the community through creating a learning environment for children in rural areas by setting up of Shiksha Protsahan Kendras (SPK) especially for first generation learners. This is a supportive structure for first generation learners at the primary school level who do not have educational support at home for their sustenance in school. The SPKs help foster linkages between schools and community thereby making schools more accountable in terms of quality and efficiency. Currently there are 60 SPKs functioning in Narmadapuram, Harda and Dewas districts.

=== Publications ===
==== Books ====
Published books cover a diverse range of topics, including:

- Science Modules
- Picture Stories
- Folktales
- Poems
- Activity books
- For Problem-solving
- Educational Classics
- Primary Education Programme
- Social Science Programme
- Fundamental Right & Duties in Our Constitution
- People's Science and Development Issues

===== Sandarbh =====
A bimonthly magazine for school teachers on science and education, Sandarbh means "context", and carries articles on various topics in Science and Education. These articles are meant to be a resource primarily for middle and high school teachers and students, who teach and learn in Hindi. The articles are usually in an informal style, and as far as possible are free of jargon. The magazine also serves as a means of communication between teachers across the country who write about their classroom experiences, activities and experiments that have worked and failed. Articles submitted to Sandarbh are often in Hindi, though many of them are in English and other languages as well, and are translated for publication.

===== Srote =====
A monthly compilation of news and features in science and technology. These articles are part of a weekly service that provides newspapers and magazines.

===== Chakmak =====
A monthly science magazine for children that also includes literature and art topics. Created for children 11–14 years old.
