= Hirabai Lobi =

Indian tribal leader

Hirabai Ibrahim Lobi
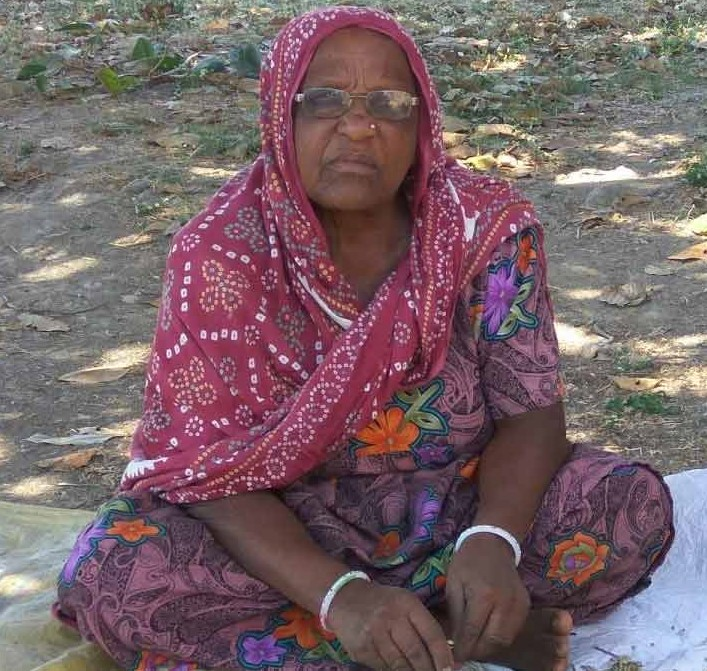
- Undated image of Lobi
- Born: 1953; Talala tehsil, Gir Somnath district, Gujarat, India
- Died: January 24, 2025 (aged 72–73)
- Occupation: Social worker
- Awards: Padma Shri (2023)

Hirabai Ibrahim Lobi (1953 – 24 January 2025) was an Indian tribal leader and social worker from Gujarat, known for her tireless efforts to uplift the Siddi tribal community. She was awarded the Padma Shri in 2023, one of India's highest civilian honors, for her contributions to social work.

== Early life and activities ==
She resided in Jambur village, located in the Talala tehsil of the Gir Somnath district in Gujarat. As a member of the Siddi community, which has African roots, Hirabai's parents died when she was young, and she was subsequently raised by her grandmother. She was married at the age of 14. She inherited a large debt from her parents.

She did not receive any formal education but acquired knowledge from her surroundings, especially through the radio. Programs on organic fertilizer-making inspired her to implement these techniques in her community. She utilized these techniques to pay off her debts, and opened an organic compost farm, which became successful and expanded substantially.

She frequently visited the Gandhinagar Secretariat, seeking new information and understanding various schemes to improve the lives of her community members. Hirabai focused on empowering women of the Siddi community. In 2004, she founded the Mahila Vikas Foundation, which became a cornerstone for her initiatives to uplift women.

Her work often focused on helping women become financially independent, and she helped create jobs for women in need. She also established childhood learning centers in her community, and encouraged tribal members to open bank accounts. She encouraged people to become entrepeneurs. Her work in the community was such that tribal members called her Sarpanch, the traditional title for an elected village head, despite her not holding the office.

She received the Padma Shri in 2023. During the ceremony, on her way to the stage, she stopped at the seat of Narendra Modi and spoke about the importance of the award to her community, which had felt forgotten. He responded with a bow. Later, when receiving the award from Droupadi Murmu, she placed her hands on Murmu's shoulders. This scene went viral.

She had two sons and a daughter.

== Death ==
Lobi died on January 24, 2025 in her home at Jambur village in Gir Somnath district.

== Awards ==
- Padma Shri (2023)
- Janakidevi Prasad Bajaj Award.
