= Romulus Whitaker =

American-born Indian herpetologist

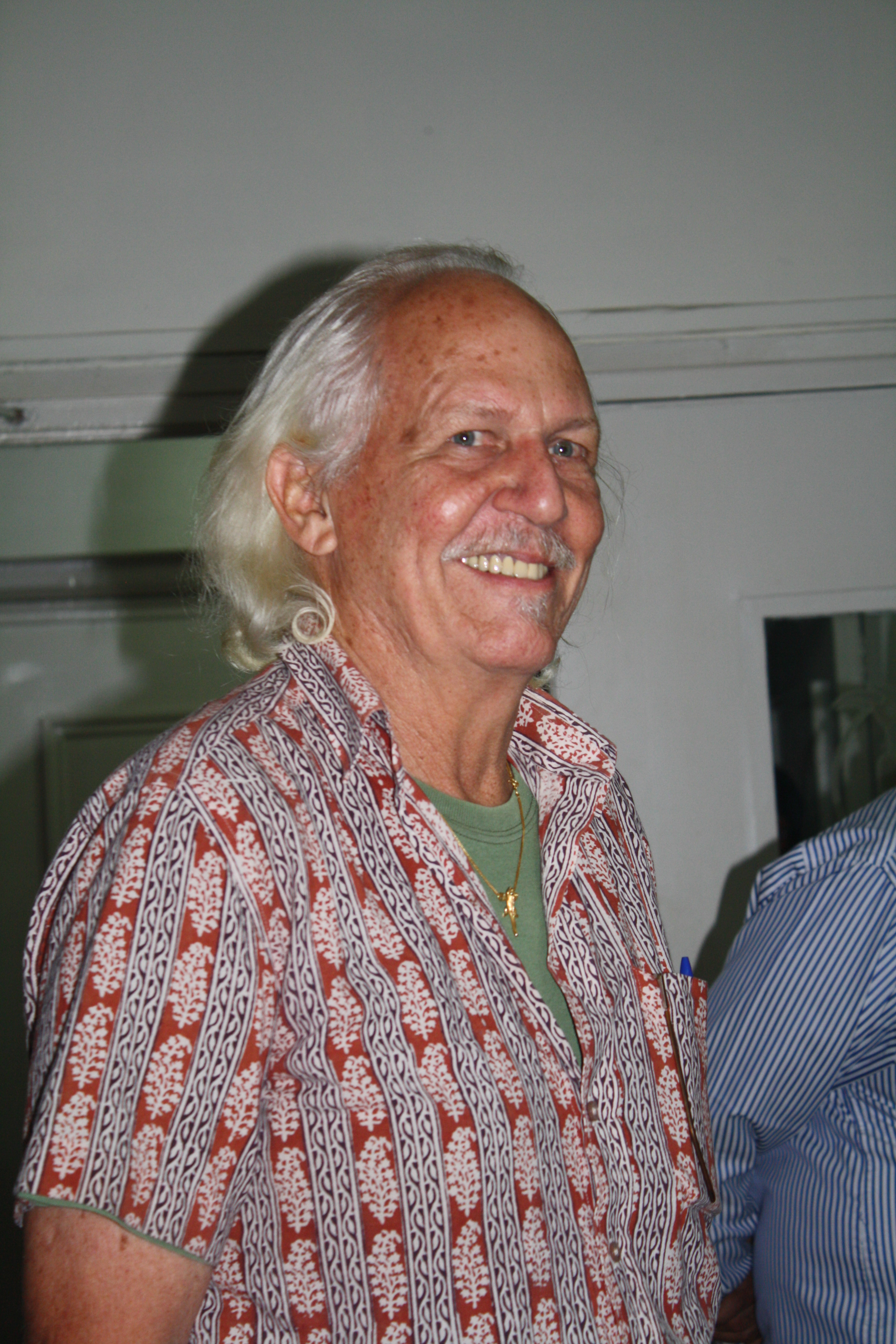
- Whitaker in 2013
- Born: Romulus Earl Whitaker; 23 May 1943 (age 83); New York City, United States
- Citizenship: United States (former); India
- Education: BSc (wildlife management)
- Alma mater: Pacific Western University
- Occupations: Herpetologist, Conservationist
- Known for: Wildlife film-making, Herpetology, Rolex Award
- Spouse(s): Zahida "Zai" Whitaker née Futehally (m. 1974; divorced); Janaki Lenin
- Relatives: Zafar Futehally (father-in-law)
- Family: Tyabji family (through Zai)

Romulus Earl Whitaker (born 23 May 1943) is an American-born Indian herpetologist, wildlife conservationist, who founded the Madras Snake Park, co-founded the Andaman and Nicobar Environment Trust (ANET), and the Madras Crocodile Bank Trust. In 1984, he was selected by the Rolex Awards for Enterprise as an associate laureate for his work in establishing the Irula snake-catchers cooperative. In 2008, he was selected again for his efforts to create a network of rainforest research stations throughout India. In 2005, he won a Whitley Award for outstanding leadership in nature conservation. He used this award to found the Agumbe Rainforest Research Station in Karnataka, for the study of king cobras and their habitat. For his work in wildlife conservation, he received the Padma Shri award in 2018 by the Government of India.

== Background and personal life ==
Whitaker (known as "Rom") was born in New York City, United States, to an American couple. His mother, Doris Norden, was an artist, and his father served in the United States Army. He has one older sister, Gail (b. 1939). After his parents divorced, his mother (who had custody of her children) married Rama Chattopadhyay, son of Harindranath and Kamaladevi Chattopadhyay. The family, including Rom and Gail, initially settled in New York City. In 1951, after the birth of Rom's half-sister Nina, they all moved to Bombay (now Mumbai). Rom's stepfather, Rama Chattopadhyay, was a pioneer in color film processing; he established India's first colour motion-picture processing lab in Worli, Mumbai. Rom's half-brother Neelkanth was born in Mumbai in 1953.

Rom continued his education (begun in New York City) at the Kodaikanal International School (class of 1960). He studied briefly at the University of Wyoming. He served briefly in the Merchant Navy and worked from 1963 to 1965 at the Miami Serpentarium with Bill Haast, whom he affectionately calls "guru". During the early Vietnam era, as an American citizen of the correct age, he was drafted into the U.S. Army, where he trained and served as a medic on a military base hospital in Texas and later Japan. He returned to India aboard the Greek freighter Hellenic Leader in 1967, and he has lived here ever since. He is now a naturalized Indian citizen.

In 1974, Whitaker married Zai Whitaker, and the couple had two sons, Nikhil and Samir. However, the marriage failed, and the couple were divorced. He later married again and lives with Indian writer Janaki Lenin on the outskirts of Mysore.

In 1986, well into his 40s, Whitaker earned a B.Sc. in wildlife management from Pacific Western University. This was merely a by-product of his lifelong passion for wildlife, especially of the reptilian variety. He is also a licensed amateur radio operator, holding an Indian callsign, VU2WIT.

== Work in India ==
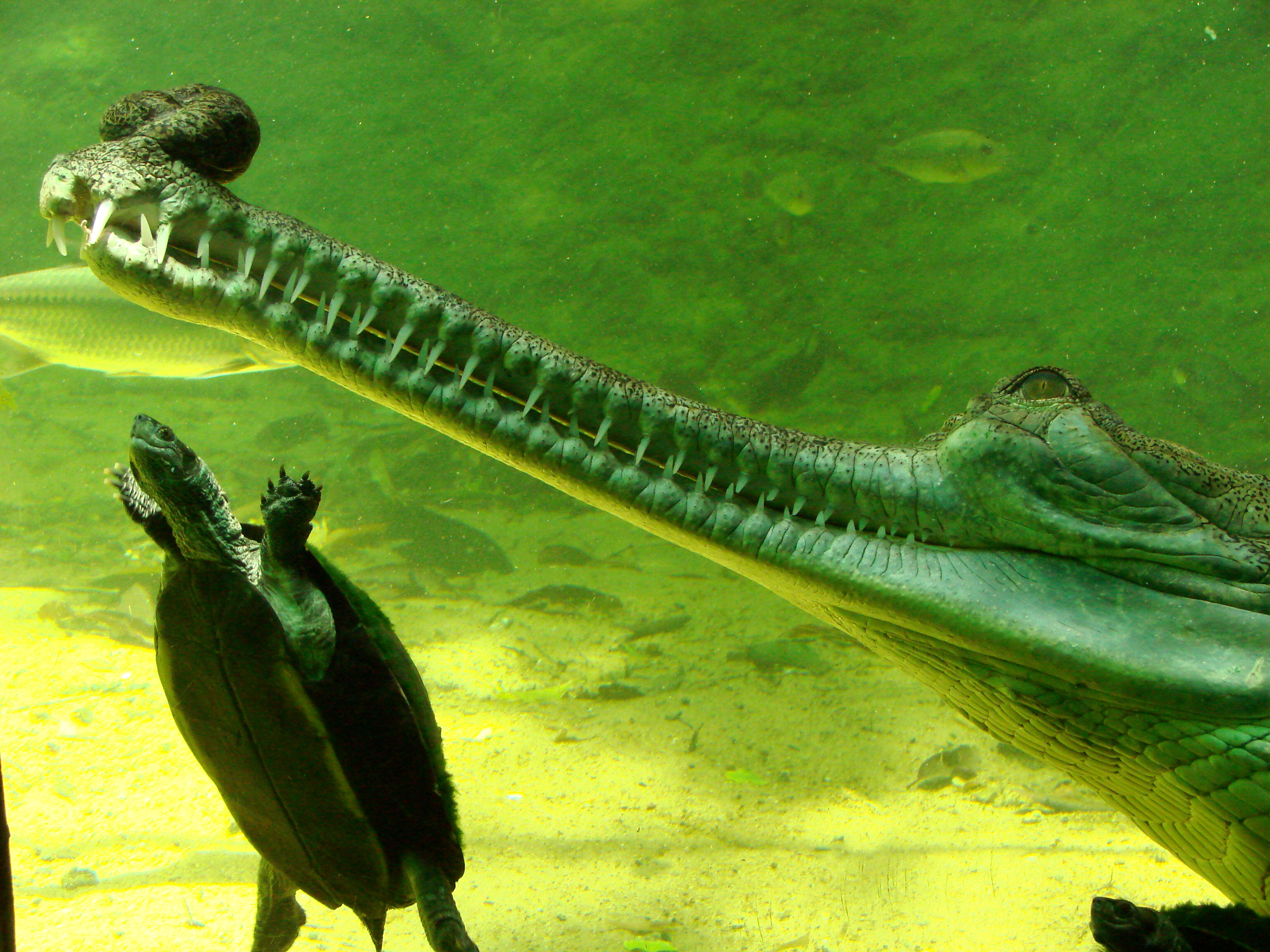
Gharial and turtles at the Crocodile Bank

Whitaker was the founding director of the Snake Park in Chennai. The park was conceived to educate the public and to help the Irula tribe, who are known for their expertise in tracking and catching snakes. The tribals had been left jobless after the Wildlife Act of 1972, which banned trade in snakeskins. Whitaker helped the Irula tribe to get involved in extracting snake venom used for the production of antivenom drugs. Rom was a co-founder of the Madras Crocodile Bank Trust Centre for Herpetology, actively involved in crocodile breeding and conservation programs.

Whitaker coordinated an effort to save the gharial, a critically endangered species of Crocodilian, with less than 250 individuals left in 1970, with numbers now over 3,000.

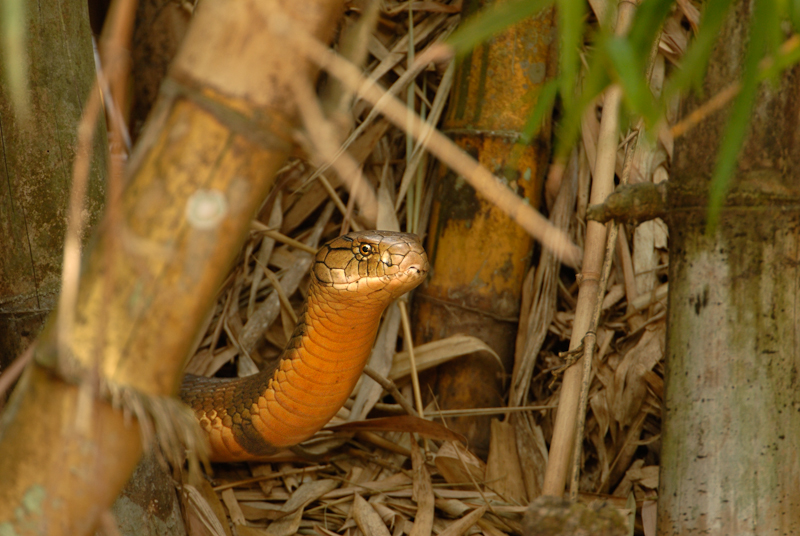
King Cobra at Agumbe Rainforest Research Station

On 27 December 2010, the Minister for Environment and Forests, Jairam Ramesh, during a visit with Rom at the Madras Crocodile Bank, announced the formation of a National Tri-State Chambal Sanctuary Management and Coordination Committee for gharial conservation on 1,600 square kilometres (620 sq mi) of the National Chambal Sanctuary for gharials along the Chambal River in Madhya Pradesh, Rajasthan, and Uttar Pradesh. The committee will comprise representatives of the states' water resources ministries, state departments of irrigation and power, Wildlife Institute of India, Madras Crocodile Bank Trust, the Gharial Conservation Alliance, Development Alternatives, Ashoka Trust for Research in Ecology and the Environment, Worldwide Fund for Nature, and the divisional forest officers of the three states. The committee will plan strategies for the protection of gharials and their habitat. This will involve further research on the species and its ecology, and socioeconomic evaluation of dependent riparian communities. Funding for this new initiative will be mobilized as a subscheme of the Integrated Development of Wildlife Habitats in the amount of Rs.50 to 80 million (US$1 to 1.7 million) each year for five years. This project has long been advocated by Rom Whitaker.

== Professional affiliations ==
Whitaker is a member of the advisory committee and the editorial board of the Bombay Natural History Society, and advisor to the Irula Tribal Women's’ Welfare Society. He co-founded the Palni Hills Conservation Council. He is chief technical advisor of Irula Snake Catchers’ Industrial Cooperative Society and convenor of the Indian National Trust for Art and Cultural Heritage, Andaman and Nicobar Islands Chapter. He is a member of the International Union for the Conservation of Nature and Natural Resources/Species Survival Commission (IUCN/SSC) - Snake Specialist Group.

== Popular culture ==
In 1989, Whitaker produced and directed the Tamil feature film The Boy and the Crocodile (Dost Magarmacch) for the Children's Film Society of India which won the Silver Elephant Award at the 6th International Children's Film Festival, New Delhi and the UNICEF Best Feature Film Award.

He was a co-producer of the 1996, 53-minute, Super 16-mm wildlife documentary, King Cobra, made for the National Geographic Channel Explorer program. This film on the natural history of the king cobra, the largest venomous snake in the world, received the Emmy Award for Outstanding News and Documentary Program Achievement, 1998. It also received Best Photography Award, Progetto Natura 8th Stambecco d'Oro Nature Film Festival, Turin, 1997; it was nominated for Best Cinematography, Jackson Hole Wildlife Film Festival 1997; Emmy Nomination for Outstanding Individual Achievement in a Craft-Cinematographers and News and Documentary, 1998, and Best Animal Behaviour, Wildscreen Film Festival 1998.

In February 2007, he was the subject of a critically acclaimed documentary produced by Icon Films and WNET (and broadcast as Supersize Crocs on PBS's Nature series) on oversized crocodiles, which was filmed in India, Ethiopia, and Australia.

In 2008 he was in the BBC Natural World documentary Crocodile Blues, on the mixed fortunes of the gharial. In January 2009, Whitaker was in another Nature documentary, The Dragon Chronicles, on real-life reptiles, such as Komodo dragons and flying lizards that inspired tales of dragons.

In February 2011, Icon Films and BBC Natural World followed Whitaker during his ongoing research into the causes and prevention of snake bites in India and produced the film One Million Snakebites. In 2013 he did an episode on leopards, Leopards: 21st Century Cats, in the same series.

He has authored several scientific articles and popular books on reptiles, especially on snakes, including the comprehensive field guide, titled Snakes of India - The Field Guide in 2004. on the snakes of India. The first of a three part autobiography was published in 2024 titled Snakes, Drugs and Rock 'n' Roll.

In 2018, he received the Padma Shri, the fourth-highest civilian awards in India for distinguish services in wildlife conservation.

== Honors, awards, and other recognitions ==
- Whitley Award (considered as top U.K. conservation prize) in 2005 for his work.
- The Peter Scott Award for Conservation Merit in 1988.
- Order of the Golden Ark, Netherlands in 1985
- Salim Ali Award in 2010
- Associate laureate in Rolex Awards in 1984 and 2008.
- A species of Indian boa, Eryx whitakeri, and a gecko Hemidactylus whitakeri are named in his honour
- Romulus Whitaker was awarded the Padma Shri (the fourth-highest civilian award) by the government of India for his work done in the field of wildlife conservation in 2018.

== External sources ==
- Whitaker, Zai (December 1994). "I married a croc man - Romulus Whitaker". International Wildlife. 24 (6). Archived from the original on 23 December 2007 – via FindArticles.
- Agumbe Rainforest Research Station (ARRS) Web Portal
