= Niranjan Pranshankar Pandya =

Indian social worker (born 1945)

- Born: 4 August 1945 (age 80); Poona, Bombay Presidency, India
- Occupation: Social worker
- Years active: 1966–present
- Awards: Padma Shri; Rishitulya Vyaktimatva Award; Rustom Alpaiwalla Memorial Award; Maharashtra State Award; Sankara Eye Centre Award

Niranjan Pranshankar Pandya (born 4 August 1945) is an Indian social worker and the secretary of Poona Blind Mens' Association, a non-governmental organization working for the cause of visually impaired people of Pune and neighbouring areas. He was honored by the Government of India, in 2012, with the fourth highest Indian civilian award of Padma Shri.

== Early life and education ==
Niranjan Pranshankar Pandya was born in Poona, in the Bombay Presidency, on 4 January 1945. While he was doing his graduate studies, an accident at the cricket ground caused him to lose his vision at the age of 17. However, he continued his studies to graduate in Sociology.

== Work ==
After education, he joined Poona Blind Men's Association (PBMA), a Poona-based NGO, founded by Tukaram Sahadev Bamankar, working for the welfare of the visually impaired people. Pandya became its secretary in 1966 and chief executive secretary in 1971.

Niranjan Pandya got PBMA affiliated to the World Blind Union (WBU) and this association gave him an opportunity to visit Germany, the Netherlands and Switzerland to learn the rehabilitation work first hand. The same year, PBMA started a technical training institute for the blind people. In 1980, the British Council invited Pandya to visit the various institutions for the blind operating in the UK. The next year, he visited the United States on a fundraising mission for the Shirdi Sai Baba Home for the Aged Blind Women, run by PBMA. In 1984, he visited the Soviet Union to study the blind welfare work there and, on his return, started a Talking Book Library at PBMA in 1986.

In 1999, after presenting a paper at a conference in New Delhi conducted by the All India Confederation of Opththalmologists, Pandya visited the US a second time to attend the Vision 99 conference in New York, on the sidelines of which he raised funds for an eye hospital. The project, conceptualized by Pandya and costed approximately US$2 million, was completed the next year when H. V. Desai Eye Hospital was opened to public in January 2000. The hospital is known to provide free of cost surgeries to poor people, constituting 60 percent of the total surgeries performed there. Since inception, the hospital is reported to have performed 367,000 surgeries and attended to 2.293 million out-patients and is known to be the largest eye hospital in Western India.

Niranjan Pandya has delivered lectures at various national and international conferences as well as on the All India Radio, besides writing articles on blind welfare in journals and magazines. He has also launched a program for the welfare of the senior citizens under the banner Sponsor a Granny-Grandad, in association with Helpage International.

== Positions ==
Niranjan Pandya serves as a member of the Access Audit Committee of the Government of India and is associated with the Vision 2020, an initiative of the International Agency for Prevention of Blindness as a member. He is the vice president of the National Association for the Blind and a member of the Zonal Advisory Committee of the Rehabilitation Council of India, the district committee for the Prevention and Control of Blindness, a government initiative, and advisory committee of the Department of Social Service under the Ministry of Health and Family Welfare. A Paul Harris Fellow of Rotary International, Pandya has served as the chairman of the Eye Care Committee of Rotary Club in Pune. He is also a member of the Asian Blind Union, the World Blind Union and the board of governing councils for the National Societies for the Handicapped in India.

== Awards and recognitions ==
The Government of India awarded Pandya the fourth highest Indian civilian honor of Padma Shri in 2012. In 2014, he received the Rishitulya Vyaktimatva Award from Rotary International. A recipient of the Rustom Alpaiwalla Memorial Award from the National association for the Blind, Pandya has also received the Maharashtra State Award for best performance on two occasions, 1987–88 and 1988–89 and Sankara Eye Centre Award in 2007.

== See also ==
- World Blind Union
