= Chutni Mahato =

Indian social worker

- Born: 1959 (age 66–67); Bholadih, Seraikela Kharsawan district
- Other name: Chutni Devi
- Awards: Padma Shri (2021)

Chutni Mahato, also known as Chutni Devi (born 1959), is a social worker from Jharkhand, India. Once a victim of witch-branding, she now works to help others who have been branded as witches and spreads awareness about superstitions and witchcraft. In 2021, she was awarded the Padma Shri for her social work, India's fourth highest civilian award.

== Life ==
Mahato was born in Bholadih village, Seraikela-Kharsawan district in Jharkhand in 1959. Married off as a child, she was labelled a witch in 1995 after a family member fell ill. The villagers grabbed her property, ill-treated her including sexual abuse, forcing her to drink urine and being paraded semi-naked. She ran away, finding her way back to her parents house. On approaching the police, they demanded a hefty sum to register the case. An Indian Administrative Service officer connected her to social workers who were working in the area of prevention of witch hunting. Following this, for over two decades, she has taken up the cause against superstitious practices and beliefs in Jharkhand. Chutni has skilled her daughters to also fight against the practice. In 1996 a documentary captured her life and social work. In 2014, a Bollywood movie "Kala Sach– The Dark Truth" was supposedly inspired by her; however it turned out to be a normal stereotyped Bollywood horror movie. A web series is in production.

In 2019, 27 women died following witch-related accusations in her state. According to National Crime Records Bureau 372 people killed in India in related-incidents between 2016 and 2019.
