= KS Rajanna =

Indian social worker

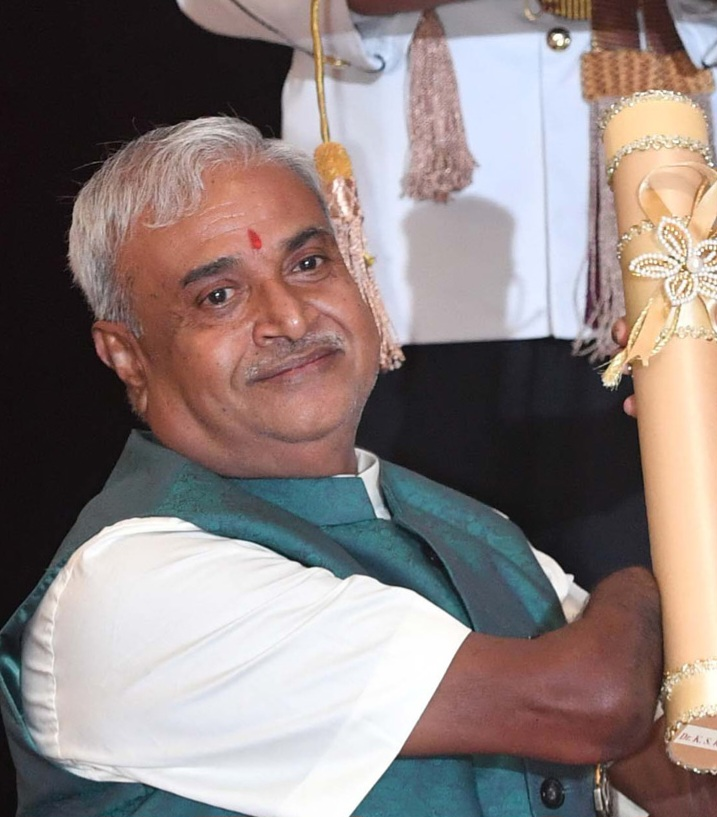
- Rajanna during receiving Padma Shri Award in May 2024
- Born: 6 December 1959 (age 66); Koppa, Mandya district, Karnataka, India
- Education: Diploma in Mechanical engineering
- Awards: Padma Shri

KS Rajanna is a 64-year-old social worker from Bengaluru. He lost the use of his hands and legs due to polio at the age of 11. President Droupadi Murmu presented Padma Awards 2024 at the second Civil Investiture Ceremony at the Rashtrapati Bhavan in New Delhi. He holds a diploma in mechanical engineering. In the 2002 Paralympics, Rajanna won India a gold in discus throw and a silver in swimming. He is also an entrepreneur, and employs over 350 people, many of them persons with disabilities.

== Honour ==
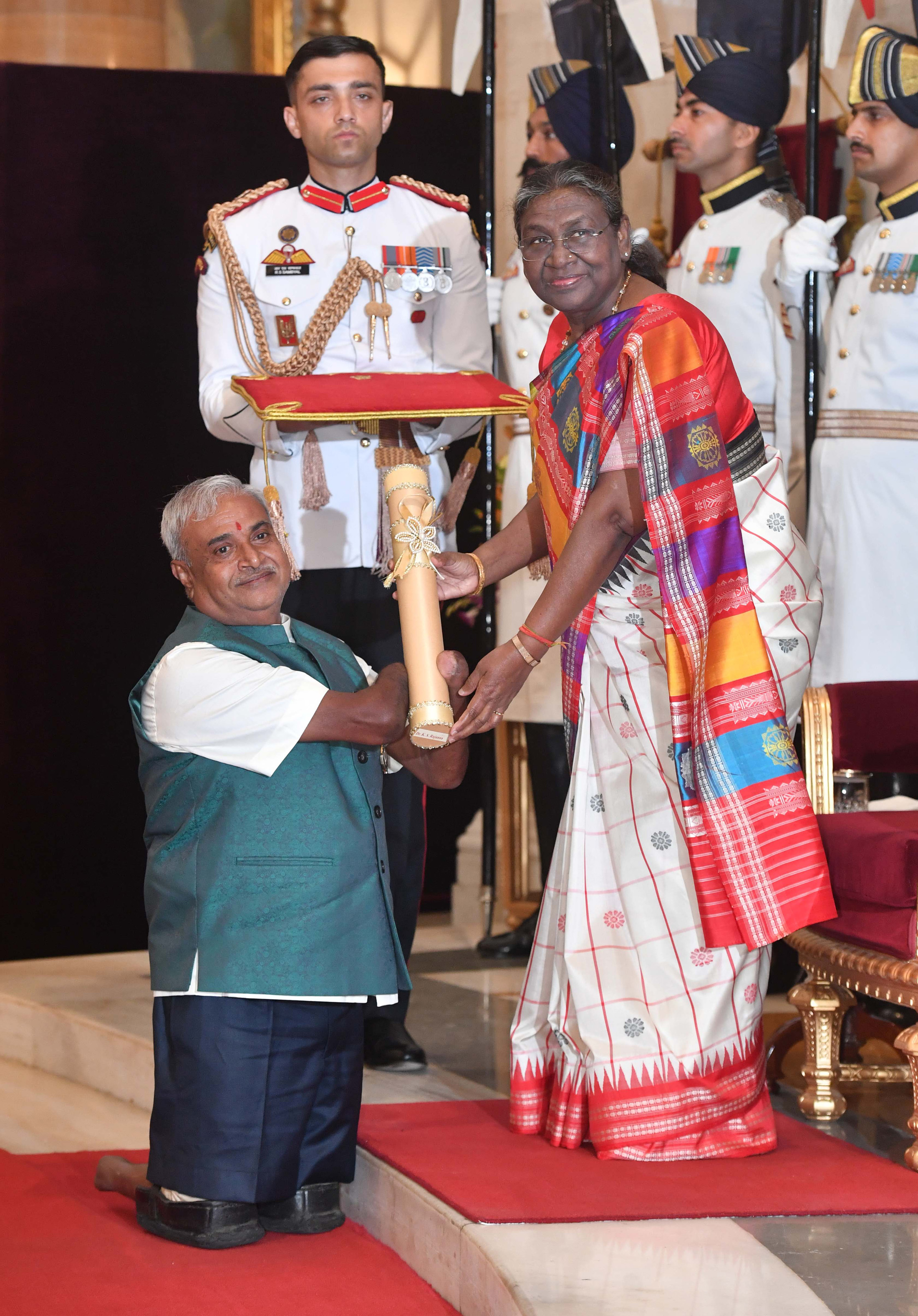
Rajanna receiving the Padma Shri award from President Droupadi Murmu on 9 May 2024

- 2024 – Padma Shri, India's fourth highest civilian award.
