= Gamit Ramilaben Raysingbhai =

Indian social worker

Gamit Ramilaben Raysingbhai (born 1 June 1969) is a tribal social worker from Taparwada Village, Tapi district, Gujarat, India, known for her work in transforming several villages in Gujarat to open-defecation free villages. She is also known for her work for the empowerment of rural women by setting up a large number of self help groups of women. In the year 2022, the government of India honoured Gamit Ramilaben Raysingbhai by conferring the Padma Shri Award for her contribution to social work.

== Life and work ==
Ramilaben Raysingbhai born on 1 June 1969, in the Gamit community which is a community of Adivasi indigenous Bhil people of Gujarat. The community is included in the state list of scheduled tribes. She has had formal education up to Standard X only. Coming from a humble background, she worked at the grass root level, and her efforts helped to transform nine villages into open defecation free villages. She created more than 700 sanitary units. She also conducted several awareness programmes on the ill-effects of open defecation. For the empowerment of tribal women, she helped set up 162 self help groups of women, and through these self help groups, the benefits of many government schemes for the uplift of women were made available to the tribal community. These included benefits under the Pradhan Mantri Suraksha Bima Yojana, Pradhan Mantri Jeevan Jyoti Yojana, Atal Pension Yojana, and Sukanya Yojana. She worked especially for the welfare of widows by creating awareness about several schemes intended for the benefit of widows. She was also in the forefront in the fight against the COVID-19 pandemic.

== Padma Shri award ==
In the year 2022, the government of India conferred the Padma Shri Award, the third highest award in the Padma series of awards, on Gamit Ramilaben Raysingbhai for her distinguished service in the field of social work. The award was in recognition of her service as a "Tribal social worker - leading SHGs in working across education, healthcare and sanitation".

== Other recognitions ==
Some other awards conferred on Ramilaben include:

- "Swachh Shakti Award" in 2017 for outstanding performance under Swachh Bharat Abhiyan
- "Nari tu Narayani Award"

== See also ==
- Padma Shri Award recipients in the year 2022
