= Bikram Bahadur Jamatia =

Indian social worker

- Occupation: Social worker
- Known for: Social activism
- Awards: Padma Shri

Bikram Bahadur Jamatia is a Tripuri Indian social worker and the former Akra (Head) of the Jamatia Hoda. He played an important role in promoting an indigenous people’s ‘movement’ against the NLFT, ATTF and other small terror group in Tripura. Jamatia received the Deendayal Upadhyaya National Integration Award Award and the Kalikinkar Debbarma Award for Excellent Performance in Classical Music in 2018. In 2023, he was awarded the Padma Shri (2023), the fourth-highest civilian award in India.

== Social Work ==
In the late 1990s when the insurgency was at its peak in Tripura he used to visit militancy infested tribal areas ignoring threat and motivated villagers to stand up against the insurgency. He has been promoting indigenous faith, cultural and heritage for decades, he had also played the role of ambassador against alleged conversion in the Tripura's hilly areas.
