= Arvind Gupta (toy inventor) =

Indian toy inventor, author, translator and scientist

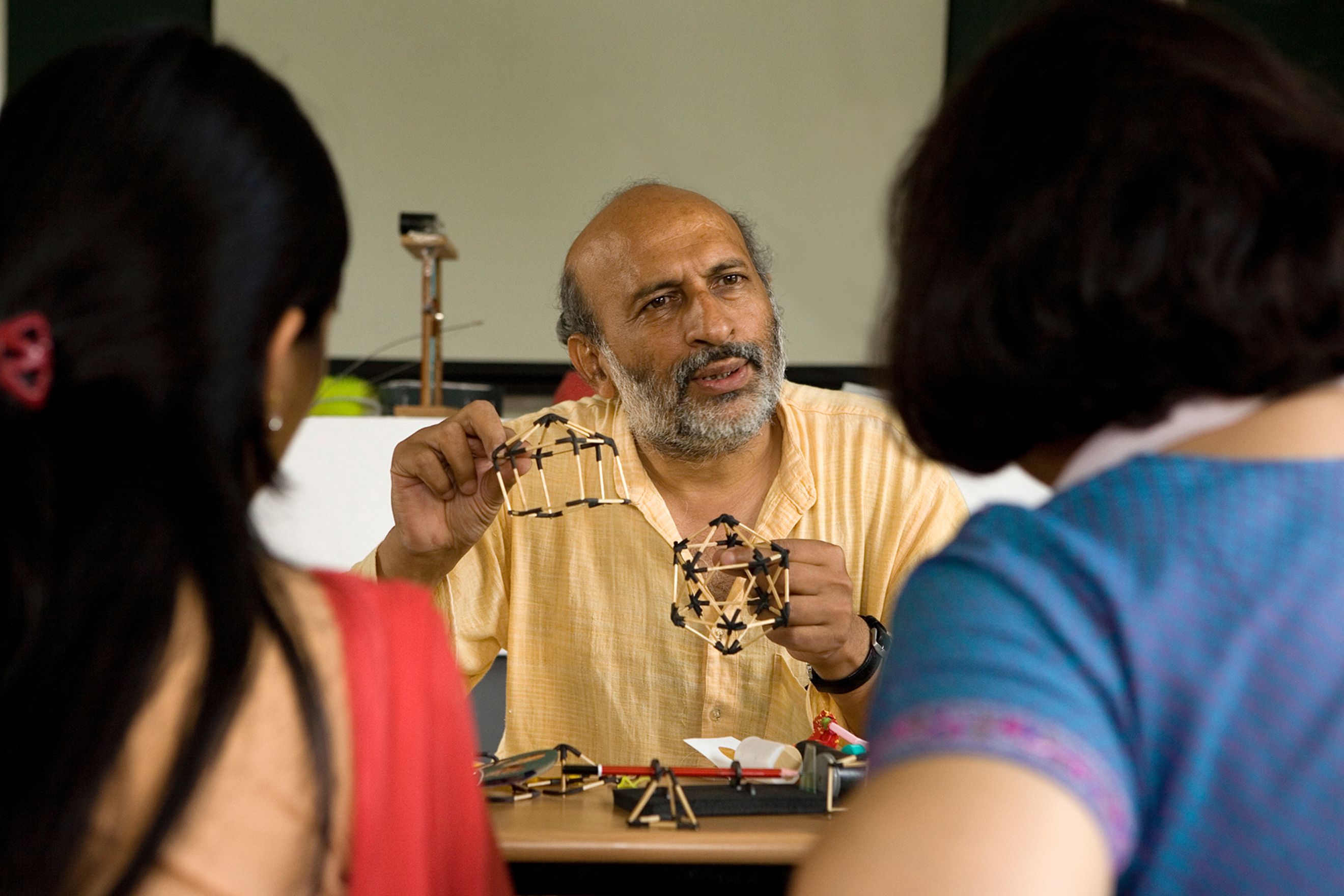
- Gupta teaching students using " Matchstick Mecanno ", one of his ways to create great teaching aids from domestic items
- Occupations: Toy inventor, author, translator
- Years active: 1975–present
- Website: https://www.arvindguptatoys.com/

Arvind Gupta is an Indian science educator, toy inventor, author, translator and scientist. He received the civilian award Padma Shree from the Indian government on the eve of Republic Day, 2018.

== Career ==
A graduate from Indian Institute of Technology, Kanpur (1975 batch), Arvind Kumar Gupta took a year's study leave from TELCO (in 1978) to work with the grassroots village science teaching programme for children in the tribal district of Hoshangabad, Madhya Pradesh called Hoshangabad Science Teaching Programme (HSTP) in Madhya Pradesh. While there, he developed his idea of creating simple toys and educational experiments using locally available materials as well as items usually thrown as trash. These simple toys, he found, fascinated children and Gupta went on to make these as the hallmark of his movement of popularising science.

Arvind Gupta's first book, Matchstick Models and other Science Experiments, was translated into 12 Indian languages by various popular science groups and sold more than half a million copies. Gupta's website holds instructions, including short video clips on YouTube, in a number of languages, for making hundreds of improvised toys, which he makes available freely without copyright restrictions. Gupta draws inspiration from a number of people, including Gautama Buddha, George Washington Carver and his mother. Gupta has conducted workshops in over 2000 schools and has won many national and international awards. As a student in the 1970s in IIT Kanpur, Gupta became a socialist in belief but eschewed action-less discourse; he stated that instead he "placed more faith in small positive action than empty rhetoric." Gupta began his social service by teaching the children of the mess staff who had no opportunities for formal education.

His popular TED Talk: Turning Trash into Toys for learning gives an insight into his work and philosophy. His talk was among the 10 best TED talks compiled by Sir Ken Robinson and Sugata Mitra's 5 favorite education talks.

== Honorary doctorate ==
On 10 December 2024, Arvind Gupta was conferred honorary doctorate D.Sc. degree by Veer Madho Singh Bhandari Uttarakhand Technical University, Dehradun.

== Selected awards and recognition ==
He has won several awards for his lifelong efforts at popularizing science and in designing teaching aids for young children. These include:

- The Padma Shree conferred by the Government of India, (2018).
- Dr. Narendra Dabholkar Memorial Award by the Maharashtra Foundation (2018).
- Distinguished Math Teacher's Award, Association of Maths Teachers of India (AMTI) (2016).
- The Dadhichi Award given by The Education Society, Ambarnath, Maharashtra (2012).
- Sri Chandrasekarendra Saraswati National Eminence Award conferred by the South Indian Education Society, Mumbai (2010).
- The TWAS (Third World Academy of Sciences) Regional Prize for Public Understanding and Popularization of Science (2010).
- The C. N. R. Rao Education Foundation Prize for Outstanding Science Teachers (2010).
- One-India One-People Award, conferred by the One-India, One-People Foundation, Mumbai (2009).
- The Indira Gandhi Award for Science Popularization conferred by INSA(2008).
- Prof. G. D. Parikh Memorial Award, conferred by the M.N. Roy Humanist Center for distinguished contributions in education (2004).
- The Distinguished Alumnus Award from IIT Kanpur in 2001
- National Association for the Blind Award, for designing appropriate teaching aids for pre-school visually impaired children (1991).
- The inaugural National Award for Science Popularization among Children conferred by the DST, Government of India (1988).

== Bibliography ==
- Wonders from toys (2015) - Scholastic, India. Illustrated by Reshma Barve.
- Women on Wheels (2015) - Graphic Novel, Manovikas. Illustrated by Ishita Dharap.
- Hands-On Maths (2014) - Scholastic, India. Illustrated by Reshma Barve.
- Fun with Leaves (2014) - Scholastic, India. Illustrated by Dr. Vidula Mhaiskar.
- Sci Fun (2013) - Scholastic, India. Illustrated by Reshma Barve.
- Toys from Trash (2013) - Scholastic, India. Illustrated by Reshma Barve.
- Thumbs Down (2012) - Scholastic, India. Fun with Thumbprints. Illustrated by Dr. Vidula Mhaiskar.
- Amazing Activities (2012) - Scholastic, India. Illustrated by Reshma Barve.
- The Story of Solar Energy (2011) - Scholastic, India. Illustrated by Reshma Barve.
- Science from Scrap (2010) - Scholastic, India. Illustrated by Chinmayee Samant.
- Bright Sparks (2009)- Illustrated by Dr. Karen Haydock. Published by (INSA) - Platinum Jubilee Celebrations.
- Science Skills & Thrills (2008) - Published by Kerala State Institute of Children's Literature.
- Quick Science (2009) - Scholastic India.
- Odds & Ends (2009) - Scholastic India.
- Aha! Activities (2006) - Published by Eklavya, Bhopal (www.eklavya.in)
- Hands-On (2002) Published by Vigyan Prasar.
- String Games (2002) - Illustrated by Avinash Deshpande. Published by National Book Trust.
- Ten Little Fingers (2000) - Illustrated by Avinash Deshpande. Published by National Book Trust.
- Little Toys (1996) - Illustrated by Avinash Deshpande. Published by National Book Trust.
- Toy Treasures (1993) - Illustrated by Avinash Deshpande. Published by Eklavya (www.eklavya.in)
- Toy Joy (1992) - Published by Vigyan Prasar.
- Pumps from the Dump - (1992) Published by Vigyan Prasar.
- Leaf Zoo (1992) - Published by Vigyan Prasar.
- The Toy Bag (1991) - Illustrated by Avinash Deshpande. Published by Eklavya (www.eklavya.in)
- Tangrams (1990) Published by Balsahiti, Hyderabad.
- Little Science (1989) - Illustrated by Avinash Deshpande. Published by Eklavya (www.eklavya.in)
- Matchstick Models & other Science Experiments (1987) - Illustrated by Avinash Deshpande. Translated into 13 Indian languages. Published by Eklavya (www.eklavya.in)

== Translation in Hindi ==
Arvind Gupta has translated over 290 books to Hindi.
