= Kanubhai Hasmukhbhai Tailor =

Indian social worker

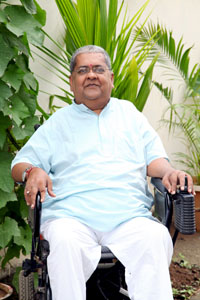
- Born: 17 May 1956 (age 69); Adas, Kheda, Gujarat, India
- Occupation: Social worker
- Awards: Oscar award Gujarat Gaurav Award; Godfrey Phillips Bravery National Award
- Website: http://www.disableindia.org

Kanubhai Hasmukhbhai Tailor is an Indian social worker who is physically disabled. He is from Gujarat and the founder of the non governmental organization, Disable Welfare Trust of India, working towards the upliftment of physically disabled people. The Government of India honoured Tailor in 2011, with the fourth highest civilian award of Padma Shri.

== Biography ==
Kanubhai Hasmukhbhai Tailor was born on 17 May 1956 in a small village of Adas, in the Kheda district of the Indian state Gujarat, in a family with meagre financial resources. While doing his early schooling, Kanubhai contracted Poliomyelitis due to which he had the permanent disability in both his legs. However, he continued his studies and graduated from the Shree Sahajanand Arts and Commerce College in Ahmedabad.

Kanubhai began his social life with a hunger strike in 1979 for free travel facilities for the disabled people. After eleven days of strike, the Government of Gujarat allowed free travel to physically disabled people. Soon, he moved to Surat and started a small printing press, operating out of his house. In 1991, Kanubhai founded the Disable Welfare Trust of India for the welfare of the disabled people in the fields of education, vocational training and rehabilitation. The Trust has over the years grown to house a school, physiotherapy centre, vocational training centre, boys and girls hostels and a rehabilitation centre, covering 400 children.

== Awards and recognition ==
During the period he was running the printing press, Kanubhai was honored by the Government of Gujarat with the award of the Best Employer. He has also received the Gujarat Gaurav award from the government. The Government of India included Kanubhai in the Republic Day honours list, in 2011, for the Padma Shri. This was followed by the Godfrey Phillips Bravery National Award, which he received in 2013. Tailor received the Lifetime Achievement Award at the Ahmedabad International Film Festival.

== See also ==
- Disable Welfare Trust of India
