= Mohammed Sharif =

Indian social worker

- Born: Ayodhya, India
- Other name: Sharif Chacha
- Occupations: Bicycle mechanic, social worker
- Awards: Padma Shri (2020); Maati Ratan by Shaheed Shodha Sansthan

Mohammed Sharif, popularly known as Sharif Chacha, is an Indian bicycle mechanic and social worker from Uttar Pradesh. He is known for performing last rites for over 25000 unidentified and unclaimed dead bodies. He was conferred with India's fourth-highest civilian award the Padma Shri in 2020 for his contribution in social work.

== Biography ==
Sharif's eldest son, Mohammed Rais Khan, was murdered in 1992 on his way to Sultanpur. With his unclaimed body lying on the road, it was devoured by stray animals. After this incident, Sharif started performing the last rites of the unidentified dead bodies. He visits police stations, hospitals, railway stations and mortuary for unclaimed bodies. The bodies are handed over to him by police only after nobody claims it for 72 hours.

Sharif gives last rites to every unclaimed body as per their religion. He performed last rites of over 25,000 unclaimed bodies in and around Faizabad. Though he faced financial difficulties many times, he carried his activities of performing the last rites after collecting donations. He also appeared in Satyamev Jayate.

== Awards ==
Sharif was conferred with Padma Shri in 2020 for his contribution in social work.
