= Usha Chaumar =

Social worker

- Born: 1978 (age 47–48); Deeg, Bharatpur district, Rajasthan, India
- Occupations: Social worker, President of Sulabh International Social Service Organisation
- Known for: Advocacy against manual scavenging
- Awards: Padma Shri (2020)

Usha Chaumar (born 1978) is a social worker from Alwar, Rajasthan, India. She is the President of Sulabh International Social Service Organisation, the non-profit arm of Sulabh International. In 2020, she received the Padma Shri honour from the Government of India for her contribution in the field of social work, particularly in raising awareness against manual scavenging.

== Biography ==
Born in Deegh village near Bharatpur, Rajasthan to a Dalit Valmikin family, Chaumar began manual scavenging at the age of 7, along with her mother. She manually cleaned human feces without any precaution. Chaumar was married at the age of 10 and moved to Alwar into her husband's family at the age of 14 while continuing to do manual scavenging work.

In 2002, at the age of 24, she met the founder of Sulabh International, Dr. Bindeshwar Pathak, when he visited her village to speak with the manual scavengers. Under his guidance, she joined the NGO, Nai Disha, for an alternative sustainable lifestyle. Presently, she is the President of Sulabh International Social Service Organisation (SISSO), the non-profit arm of Sulabh International.

In 2020, she received the Padma Shri honour from the Government of India for her contribution in the field of social work, particularly in raising awareness against manual scavenging.
