= Meena Sharma =

Indian journalist

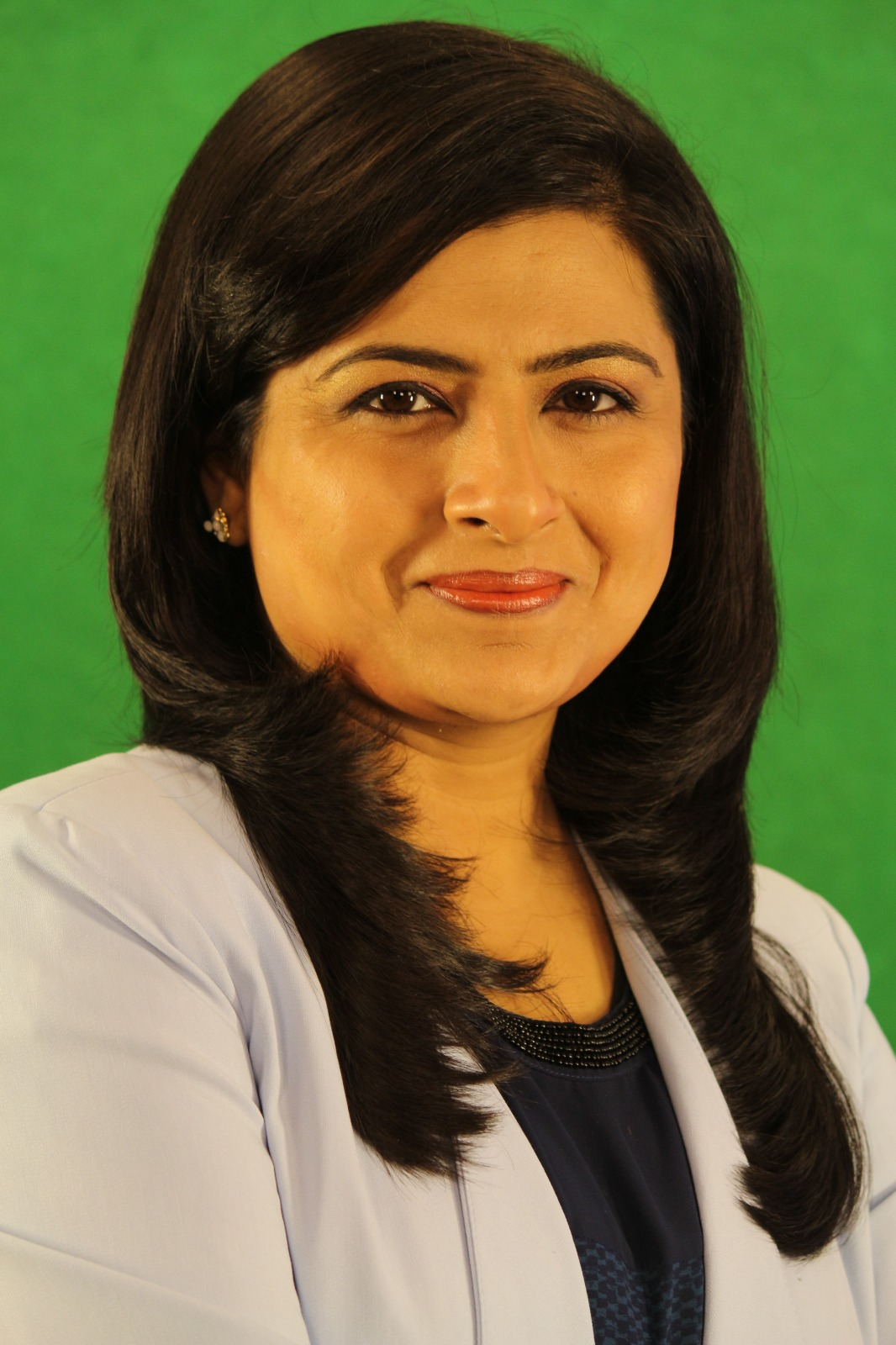
- Born: c.1984
- Occupations: Journalist and TV anchor
- Known for: investigative journalism

Meena Sharma (c.1984 - ) is an Indian journalist who was awarded the Nari Shakti Puraskar in 2016. She has identified scandals of children who did not look after their elderly parents and the large number of abortions that were taking place of pregnancies that were predicted to deliver a female child.

== Career ==
Sharma has been an editor at Patrika TV and as an anchor for Zee News on the show "Nayika". On News 18 she hosted Desh Ki Baat and "Dr Meena Sharma Ke Sath".

The Ministry of Woman, Children and Development acknowledged her help in created the Maintenance and Welfare of Parents and Senior Citizens Act in 2007 after Sharma had conducted a sting operation to expose the treatment of older people. The act made heirs legally responsible to pay for the maintenance of older people.

== Awards ==
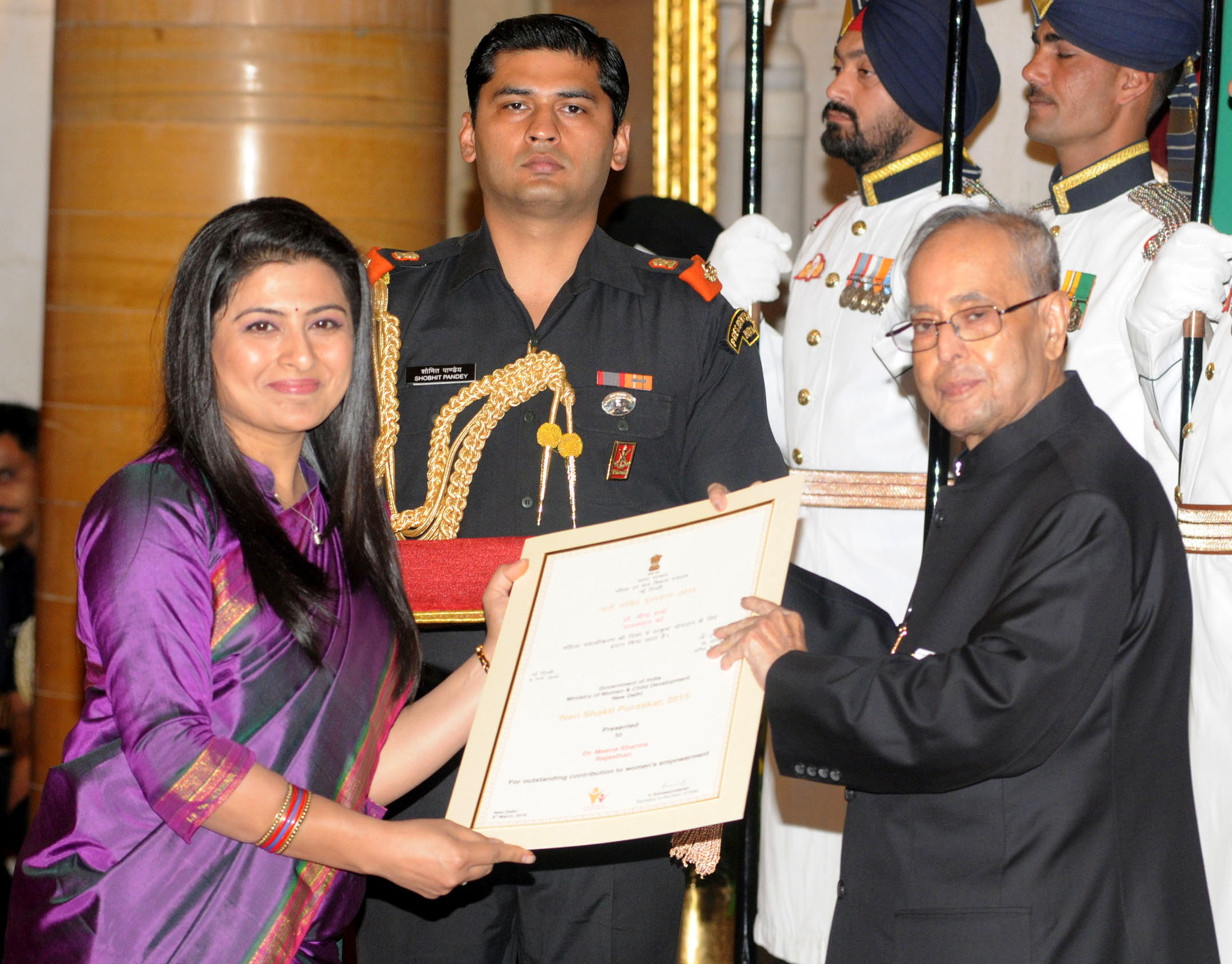
Pranab Mukherjee presenting the “Nari Shakti Award” to Dr. Meena Sharma

In a different operation she revealed how 500 organisations over six Indian states were supplying sex determination followed by illegal sex determined abortions. At the time she was a 26 year old freelance journalist working with Sahara Samay, the 24 hour Hindi news channel in Jaipur. For this work, she was chosen to receive the Nari Shakti Puraskar/Stree Shakti Puraskar on International Women's Day in 2016. The award was made by the President Pranab Mukherjee at the Rashtrapati Bhavan in New Delhi. Mukherjee and the Prime Minister Narendra Modi gave speeches about India's need to empower women highlighting the problem of the higher number of male babies due to some parents choosing to have an abortion if their child is female.

- Panna Dhai National Award for her work with the Maharana Mewar Foundation.
