= Vadivel Gopal =

Indian snake expert and conservationist

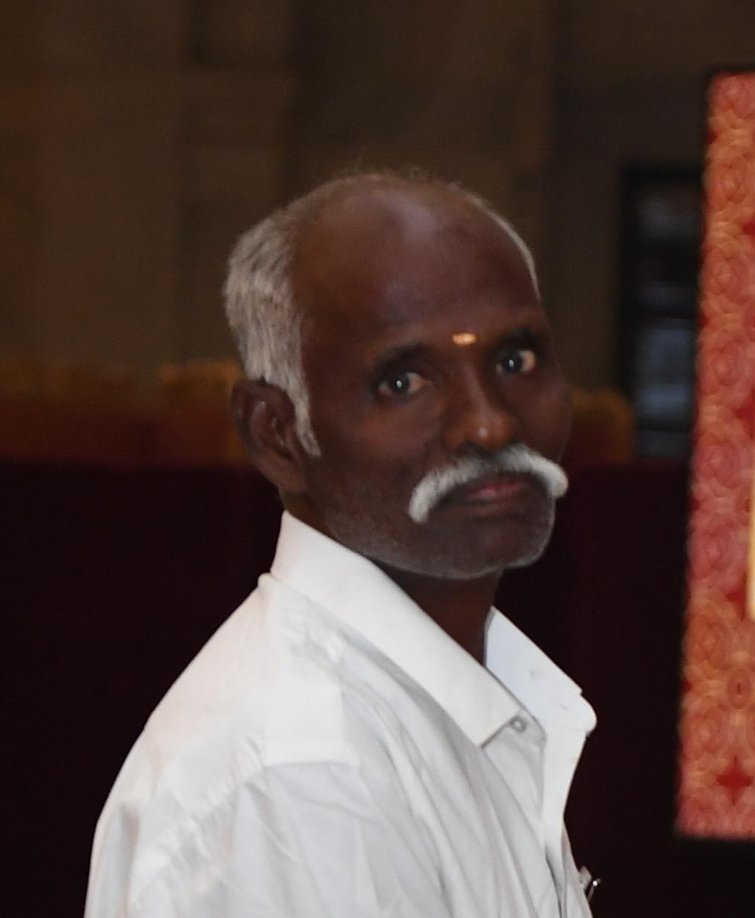
- Occupations: Snake catcher Conservationist
- Known for: Traditional snake catching for antivenom production
- Awards: Padma Shri (2023)

Vadivel Gopal is an Indian snake catcher from the Irula tribe of Tamil Nadu. He is known for his expertise in catching venomous snakes, used for production of life-saving antivenom. Along with his long-time collaborator Masi Sadaiyan, he was awarded the Padma Shri, India's fourth-highest civilian award, in 2023 for his contributions to social work in the field of healthcare.

Gopal is a member of the Irula Snake Catchers' Industrial Cooperative Society, which plays a vital role in supplying venom to laboratories across India that produce antivenom. In 2017, Gopal traveled with Sadaiyan to Florida, United States, to help train local wildlife officials in catching invasive Burmese pythons.

== See also ==
- Masi Sadaiyan
- Irula people
