= Prem Singh Labana =

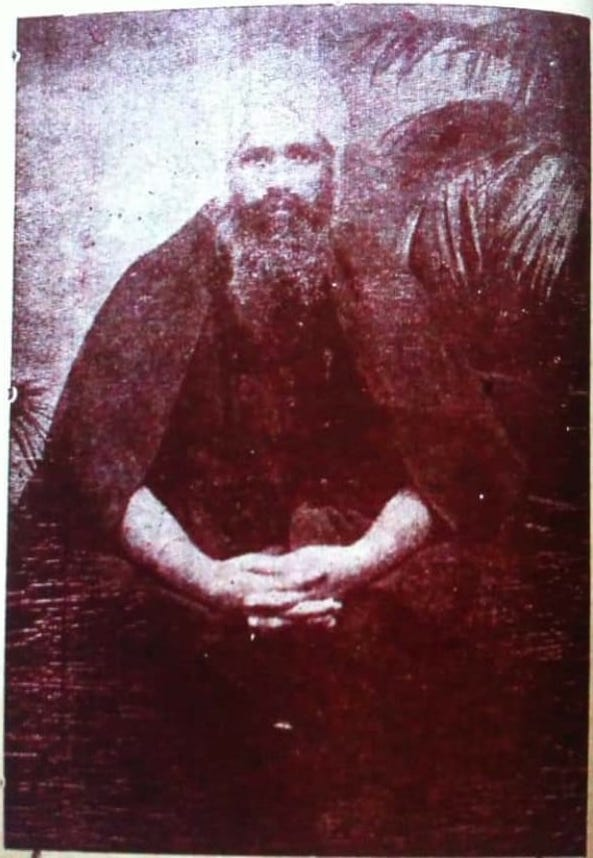
Baba Prem Singh

Prem Singh Labana (1882–1950) was an important social, political and religious leader of the Labanas, and worked for the uplift of the Lubana community in the first half of the twentieth century.

Born in 1882 at Khori Dunna Singh, a village in Gujrat district, he went to Morala Sahib in his early age and learnt Panjabi and Kirtan. In 1908 he was nominated as Sant of the Dera by Baba Bishan Singh. Henceforth he took a keen interest in his community. He regarded education as the best means of upward social mobility. Many schools were started under his guidance. He was the prominent leader of Vihar Sudhar Movement. Prem Singh preached Sikhism enthusiastically and remained a member of the Shiromani Gurdwara Parbandhak Committee from 1926 to 1950. He also became the member of its executive committee in 1948.

Prem Singh was an active Lubana participant in the Akali movement. He sent a Jatha of 25 Labanas for the Morcha under Giani Chet Singh. He contested for the membership of Legislative Assembly and was elected twice, in 1937 and then in 1946. He remained its member up to his death in 1950.
