= Himmat Ram Bhambhu =

Indian social worker and environmentalist (born 1956)

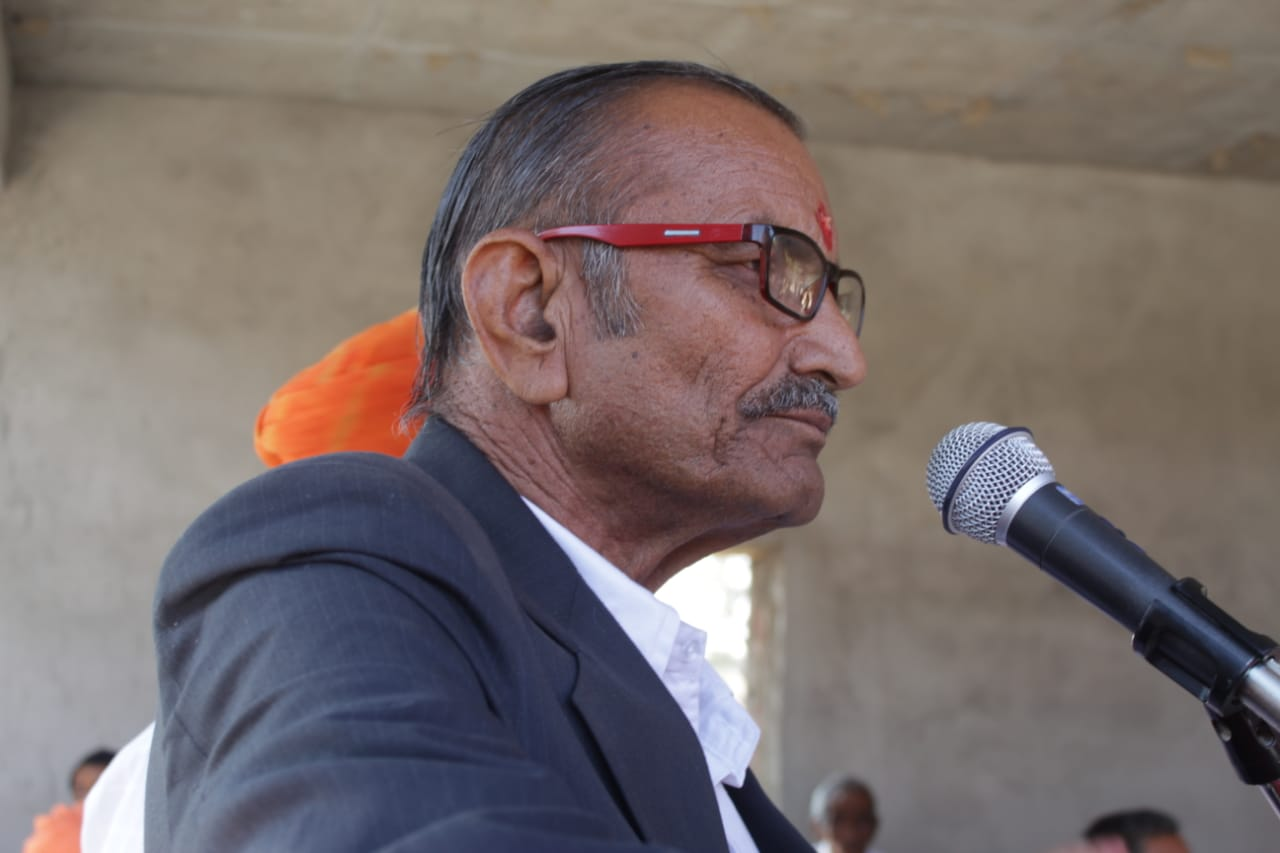
- Born: Himmat Ram Bhambhu; 14 February 1956 (age 70); Nagaur district, Rajasthan, India
- Known for: Social work, nature and wildlife conservation
- Awards: Padma Shri (2020); Rajiv Gandhi Environment Protection Award (2014); Rajasthan State Amrita Devi Vishnoi Award (2003)

Himmat Ram Bhambhu (born 14 February 1956) is an Indian farmer, social worker and environmentalist from Nagaur district in Rajasthan. He is known as Tree Man of Rajasthan, for his large-scale afforestation and grassroots wildlife conservation in arid and semi-arid areas. For his decades of work in tree planting, habitat restoration and protection of wild fauna, he was awarded the Padma Shri by the Government of India.

== Early life ==
Bhambhu was born on 14 February 1956 in Sukwasi village, Nagaur district, Rajasthan.

== Work in conservation ==
Himmat Ram Bhambhu has dedicated his life to environmental causes including planting trees, protecting birds and wildlife, and conserving forests.

According to The Better India, Bhambhu after being inspired by his grandmother’s tree-planting, began his mission in the 1970s. Over three decades, he is credited with planting more than 3 lakh trees, focusing on drought-resistant native species such as khejri, neem, and acacia. In 1999, he purchased 34 bighas of barren land in a village, where he created a green patch of about 16,000 trees that serves as a mini-forest and refuge for local wildlife.

Alongside afforestation, Bhambhu has worked to protect wildlife, rescuing over 1,500 injured animals and birds and helping secure convictions against poachers in several cases.

== Awards and recognition ==
- Padma Shri (2020)
- Rajiv Gandhi Environment Protection Award (2014)
- Rajasthan State Amrita Devi Vishnoi Award (2003)
