= Shyam Sunder Paliwal =

Indian social activist

- Born: 9 July 1964 (age 61); Piplantri, Rajsamand district, Rajasthan, India
- Occupation: Social activist
- Awards: Padma Shri (2021)

Shyam Sunder Paliwal (born 9 July 1964) is an Indian social activist from Piplantri village in Rajsamand district, Rajasthan. He is known for initiating an environmental and social campaign in his village that links the birth of girls with tree plantation. In 2021, he was honoured with the Padma Shri, the fourth-highest civilian award in India, for his work in social service.

== Early life ==
Paliwal was born in 1964 in Piplantri village, Rajsamand district, Rajasthan. He later became the sarpanch (village head) of Piplantri.

== Social initiatives ==
In 2006, after the death of his daughter, Paliwal began an initiative in which 111 saplings are planted in Piplantri to celebrate the birth of every girl child. This initiative also includes setting up a financial deposit for the girl and ensuring community participation in her upbringing.

His efforts contributed to water conservation, improved afforestation, and raised awareness about female infanticide and women’s empowerment in the region.

== Recognition ==
Paliwal received the Padma Shri in 2021 for his contribution to social work. In 2024, he was named News Maker of the Year and Green Crusader of the Year by ABP News.
