= Lakhimi Baruah =

Indian banker

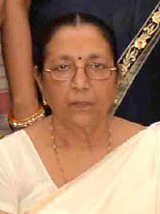
- Born: Jorhat, Assam
- Education: Bahona College
- Awards: Padma Shri

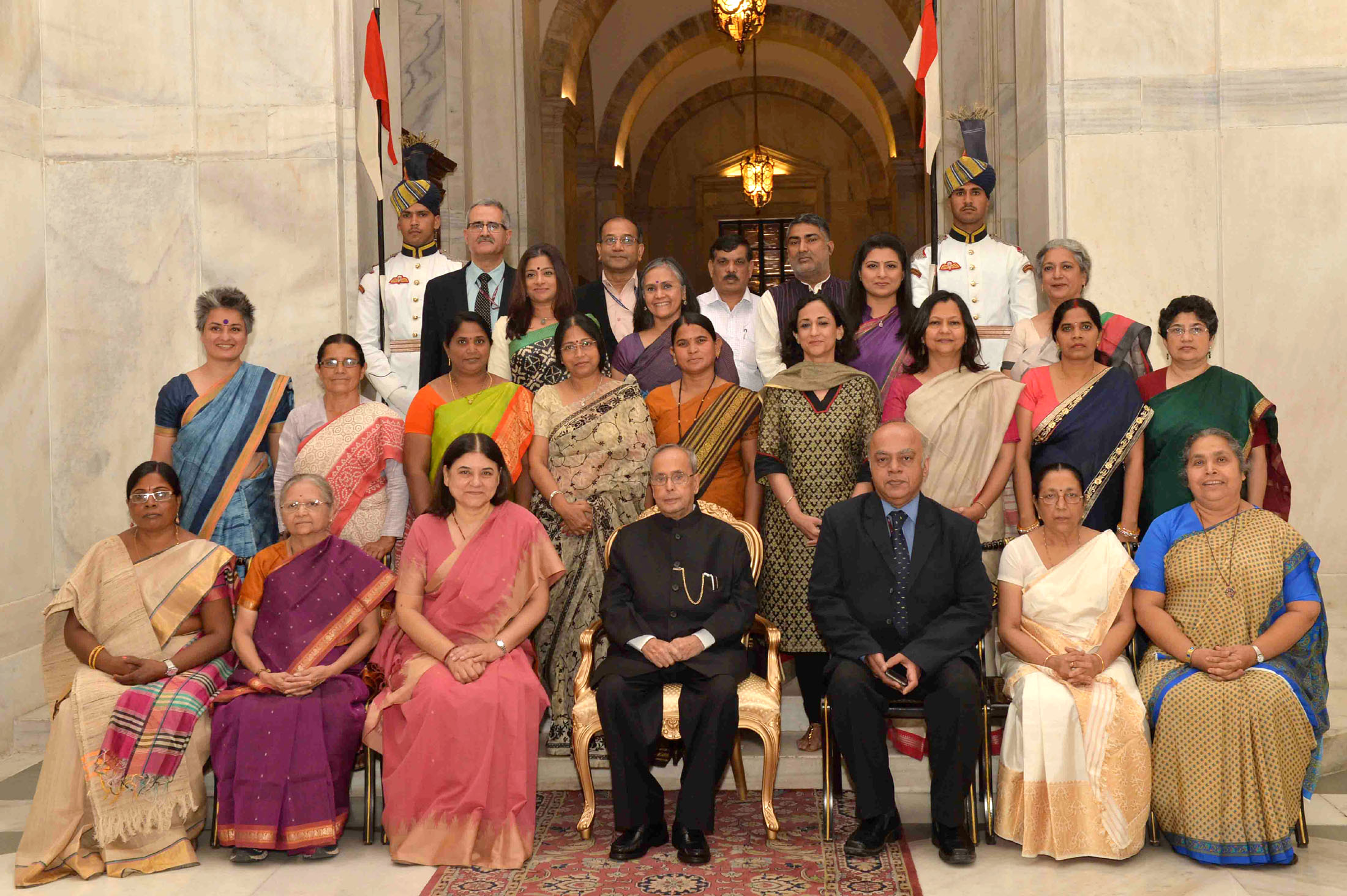
The President, Shri Pranab Mukherjee with the winners of Stree Shakti Puraskar 2015, at a function, on the occasion of the International Women's Day, at Rashtrapati Bhavan, in New Delhi.jpg

Lakhimi Baruah is an Indian banker, social worker and founder of Assam's first women run Co-operative bank Konoklata Mahila Urban Cooperative Bank for women. In 2021 she was awarded the Padma Shri, the fourth-highest civilian award in the Republic of India, for contributions and efforts to financially empower women of Assam.

== Early life and career ==
Baruah was born in Jorhat, Assam. Baruah lost her mother during childbirth and subsequently during her teen age her father also died; she was brought up by her relatives. Due to financial constraints to her family, Baruah discontinued her studies in 1969 and got married in 1973 and completed her graduation in 1980 while she was working in a bank. In 2021 Baruah was selected as Systematic Voters Education and Electoral Participation (SVEEP) by the district administration of Jorhat.

== Accolades ==
Baruah was awarded numerous accolades for her contributions and efforts to financially empower women of Assam. The most important ones are:

- Padma Shri - (2021)
- Devi Ahilya Bai Holkar Award - (2015)
- Jingle award - (2019)
