= Dukhu Majhi =

Environmental activist

- Born: January 1, 1945 (age 81); Sindri, Baghmundi, Manbhum, Bihar (presently Purulia, West Bengal)
- Other name: Gachh Dadu (Tree Grandfather)
- Movement: Tree Plantation
- Awards: Padma Shri (2024)

Dukhu Majhi is an environmental activist from West Bengal. He has planted more than 5,000 trees in the last five decades. In 2024 Government of India awarded him the Padma Shri award, the country's fourth-highest civilian honour for his contribution to society in the field of Environment- Afforestation.

== Biography ==
Dukhu Majhi was born in Sindri village, Purulia, West Bengal. Although he never received any formal education, he realized at the age of fifteen that trees are extremely beneficial in human life. He is the man behind increasing greenery of terrain of the Ajodhya Hills. Since then, he began to plant trees in the fields, meadows, crematoria. Wherever he saw empty places, he tended by planting saplings. At the age of 79, he still went out by his bicycle in the morning with two tin containers carrying some water, spade and shovel for planting trees.
