= Shankarbaba Pundlikrao Papalkar =

Indian social worker

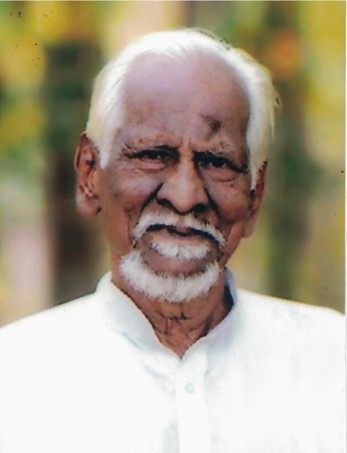
- Born: February 14, 1942 (age 84); Amravati district, Maharashtra, India
- Occupation: Social worker
- Known for: Activism for orphaned and disabled children
- Awards: Padma Shri (2024); Honorary D.Litt. from Sant Gadge Baba Amravati University (2021)

Shankarbaba Pundlikrao Papalkar (born 14 February 1942), also known as Shankar Baba Papalka, is an Indian social worker from the Amravati district of Maharashtra, India, known for his work towards rehabilitation of disabled and orphaned children. He was awarded the Padma Shri, the fourth-highest civilian honour of India, in 2024 in the field of social work. Papalkar is a follower of Osho and attributes his motivation for humanitarian work to Osho's teachings.

== Activism ==
Papalkar used to publish a Marathi magazine ‘Devkinandan Gopal’ from Mumbai in the early 70s. In 1990, he founded the Late Ambadaspant Vaidya Matimand Mukbadir Shishu Sanjivani Sanstha, an orphanage for disabled and orphaned children, on 25 acres of land in Wazzar, approximately 50 kilometers from the city of Amravati. The organization began by providing shelter to four disabled girls. Over the years, the ashram has grown to care for numerous children with physical and mental disabilities. As of 2024, the ashram was home to 123 children (98 girls and 25 boys).

Papalkar is known for providing the children in his care with a legal identity by giving them his own name. The Aadhaar cards of the children list their father's name as "Dr. Shankarbaba Pundlikrao Papalkar". He has also focused on their social integration by arranging marriages in the community. His work, which he has termed the "Vazzar Model," emphasizes self-help and mutual support among the children to foster a life of dignity.

Papalkar has also been a vocal advocate for a law concerning the rehabilitation of orphaned and mentally challenged individuals after they turn 18. He has also led environmental efforts at the ashram, planting around 15,000 trees on the land, which are cared for by the resident children.

== Awards and recognition ==
Papalkar was awarded Padma Shri in 2024 (reference: https://www.pib.gov.in/PressReleasePage.aspx?PRID=1999790&reg=48&lang=2 Padma Shri awards line number 91) in recognition of his lifelong work. He also has an honorary D.Litt. from the Sant Gadge Baba Amravati University awarded in 2021.
