= Om Prakash Gandhi =

Indian social worker

Om Prakash Gandhi (official name Om Prakash Poswal) (born 1 February 1942) is a social worker from the Indian State of Haryana dedicated to the cause of girl child education.

He was born in a Gurjar farmer family in Madhobans village in Yamunanagar district in Haryana and completed his school education from Mukand Lal Senior Secondary School, Radaur. He obtained the B Sc degree from Agra University. After securing MSc degree in physics from Meerut University (Uttar Pradesh), he joined Gurjar Degree College (since renamed as Gochar Mahavidhyalaya) at Rampur Maniharan in Saharanpur district of Uttar Pradesh as a lecturer. After 20 years of service in the college, he resigned his job to work in the field of women education. He formed the Kanya Vidhya Pracharni Sabha, a society to spread awareness about education among girls at Khadri village, in 1984 and under the aegis of the Sabha founded the Gurjar Kanya Vidhya Mandir School in Devdhar village in Yamunanagar district in Haryana. The Sabha has also established Gurjar Kanya Gurukul Mahavidyalaya, Yamuna Nagar a higher education institution for girls. On 14 January 2022, Haryana Chief Minister Manohar Lal Khattar laid the foundation stone of a new institution Samrat Mihir Bhoj Gurukul Vidyapeeth being established under the patronage of Om Praksh Gandhi.

== Recognition: Padma Shri ==
In the year 2022, the government of India conferred the Padma Shri Award, the third highest award in the Padma series of awards, on Om Prakash Gandhi for his distinguished service in the field of social work. The award is in recognition of his service as a "Social Worker from Haryana dedicated to the cause of girl child education".

== See also ==
- Padma Shri Award recipients in the year 2022
