= Somanna =

Indian social worker

- Born: June 1, 1957 (age 69)
- Known for: Tribal rights activism
- Awards: Padma Shri (2024)

Somanna (born June 1, 1957) is an Indian social worker from Karnataka, known for his work in uplifting the Jenu Kuruba tribal community, a Particularly Vulnerable Tribal Group (PVTG) of India. He was awarded the Padma Shri, India's fourth-highest civilian honor, in 2024 in the field of social work.

== Early life and background ==
Somanna was born on June 1, 1957 in the Jenu Kuruba community in Mysuru district, Karnataka. He hails from Althalhundi Moththa tribal hamlet and resides in Moththa tribal hamlet of Naganahalli Gram Panchayat in H.D. Kote taluk. He studied up to the fourth standard.

Somanna was the ninth child of his parents, Kunnaiah and Basamma, and witnessed many of his elder siblings dying due to diseases. For 16 years, Somanna worked as a bonded labourer until the Bonded Labour Abolition Act of 1976 brought an end to his servitude. Following the implementation of the Land Reforms Act, he successfully fought to secure 31 guntas of land for himself in 1980.

His wife, Rajamma, died on 7 January 2024, shortly before the announcement of his Padma Shri award. They have two sons and two daughters.

== Activism ==
Somanna has dedicated over four decades, beginning around 1978, to the welfare and rights of the Jenu Kuruba tribe and other tribal communities in Karnataka. His work has focused on securing land rights, preventing displacement, promoting education, and conserving the environment. A significant part of his activism involved helping tribal families obtain legal title deeds to their land, thereby ensuring their security and rights within forest areas. He is credited with assisting over 500 tribal communities or families in this endeavor. In the 1990s, Somanna played a crucial role in protesting against the construction of a five-star resort in the ecologically sensitive zone of Nagarhole National Park. He has been a vocal advocate for the effective implementation of the Forest Rights Act, 2006.

Somanna co-founded the Budakattu Krushikara Sangha (Tribal Agriculturists' Association) in 1981, which has been a platform for championing tribal land rights, education, healthcare, and livelihood, alongside environmental conservation. He has also collaborated with organizations like 'Aadivaasigala Munnata Sangha of Kerala' and represented the tribal community of India at an international conference in the Philippines in 1991.

Somanna has also contributed to raising awareness about tribal issues through literature. He has co-authored four novels with Ksheera Sagar, including Jene Nee Aakashada Aramaneye, which was later adapted into the Kannada film Kanneri, in which Somanna also acted. Other books include Aadivasigala Makkala Vidyaabhyaasa (Tribal Children's Education).

== Awards and recognition ==
- Padma Shri (2024)
- Valmiki Award (2023) by the Government of Karnataka for his contributions to tribal welfare

Reportedly, Somanna was unfamiliar with the Padma Shri award but viewed it as encouragement to continue his fight for the rights of tribal communities.

== See also ==
- List of Padma Shri award recipients (2020–2029)
