= Irula people =

Ethnic group in India

Irula
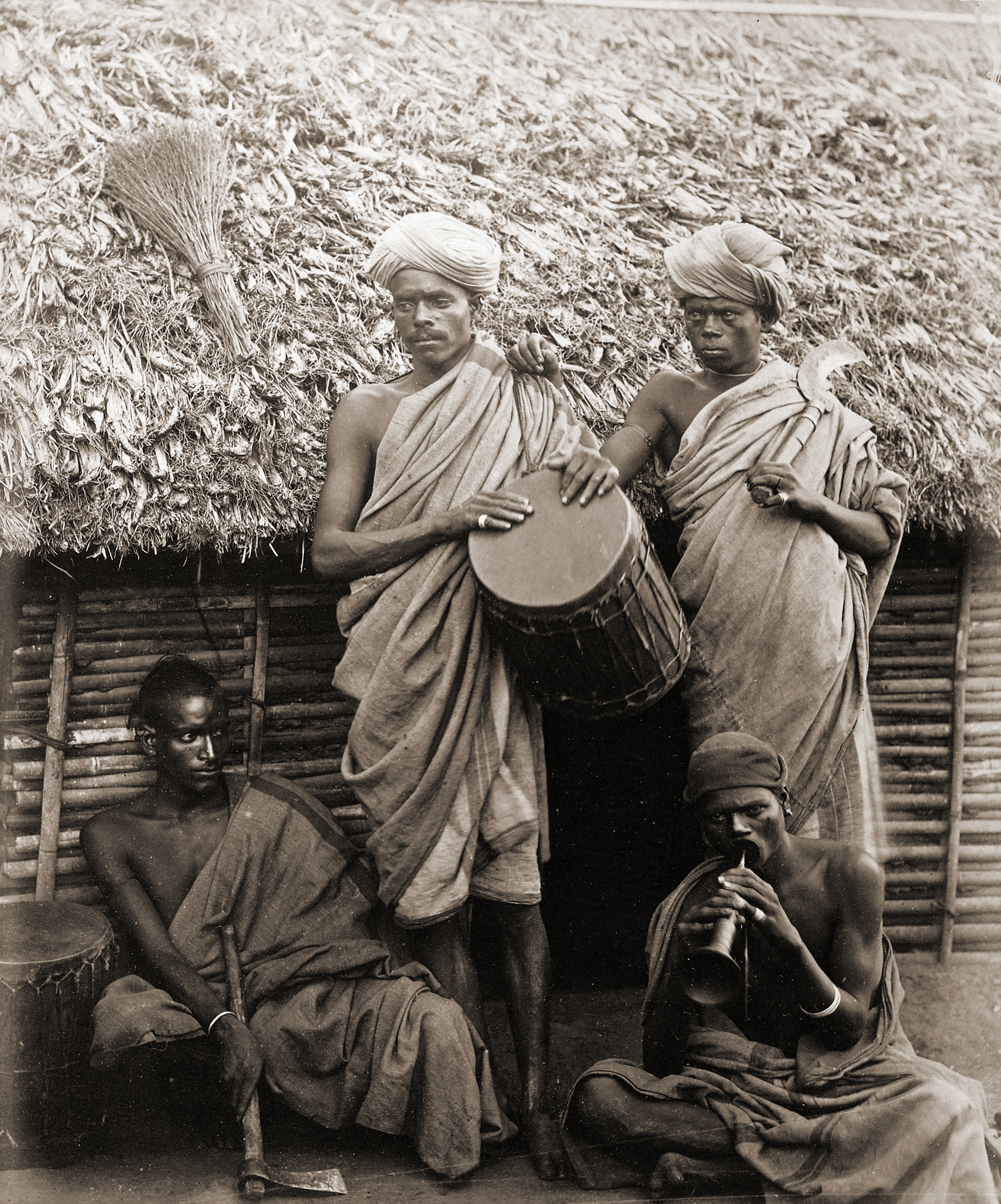
- Irula men from the Nilgiri Hills in Tamil Nadu, c.1871

Total population
- 213,641 (2011 census)

Regions with significant populations
- India
- Tamil Nadu: 189,621
- Kerala: 23,721
- Karnataka: 10,259

Languages
- Irula

Religion
- Hinduism,Traditional religion, Christianity

Related ethnic groups
- Soliga, Tamil, Yerukala

Irula, (Natively: ër̠la/ïr̠la, IPA: [ərla, ɨrla]) also known as Iruliga, are a Dravidian ethnic group inhabiting the Indian states of Tamil Nadu, and parts of Kerala and Karnataka. A scheduled tribe, their population in this region is estimated at around 200,000 people. People of Irula ethnicity are called Irular, and speak Irula, which belongs to the Dravidian language family.

== Etymology ==
Irula is derived from the term iruḷ "black" and -a/iga "people".

== Society ==
The Irula society is divided into four tribes – Vete Kadu Irulas, Male Nadu Irula, Urali and Kasava, of whom the former two intermarry hence forming three endogamous units. While majority of the Irula are illiterate, they possess a oral tradition, significant part of which are riddles.

== Distribution and religion ==
The tribe numbers around 200,000 spread across three states: 189,621 in Tamil Nadu, 23,721 in Kerala and 10,259 in Karnataka. Those in Karnataka are named Iruligas. The Irulas are mainly concentrated in northern Tamil Nadu: in a wedge extending from Krishnagiri and Dharmapuri districts in the west to Ariyalur and Cuddalore districts in the south and Tiruvallur district in the north. Small populations live in Coimbatore and Nilgiris districts and were classified by Thurston as a different population. In Kerala, the Irulas are in Palakkad district, while in Karnataka they are concentrated in Ramanagara, Chamarajanagara and Bangalore districts.

The Irula people practice some sort of Animism where they primarily believe in a goddess named Inga who lives with her six sisters worshipped in the form of stones under trees. The Irula people traditionally believe that these 7 sisters created the first Irula man and woman. This traditional concept of seven goddesses was Sanskritised as Sapta Matrika. The Irula people also believe in ancestral spirits, and they traditionally believe that Kannipe (spirits of virgin girls) can possess anyone. These kannipe spirits are worshipped as guardian deities of villages by Irula tribals. The Irula also believe in the presence of evil spirits known as Pe who can possess and haunt people. In order to keep these spirits away, a rooster is sacrificed and offered to them. Many Irula people worship Hindu gods and also take part in Hindu festivals. Some Irulas have also been converted to Christianity.

== Language ==
The Irula speak the Irula language, a Dravidian language that is closely related to Tamil.

== Economy ==
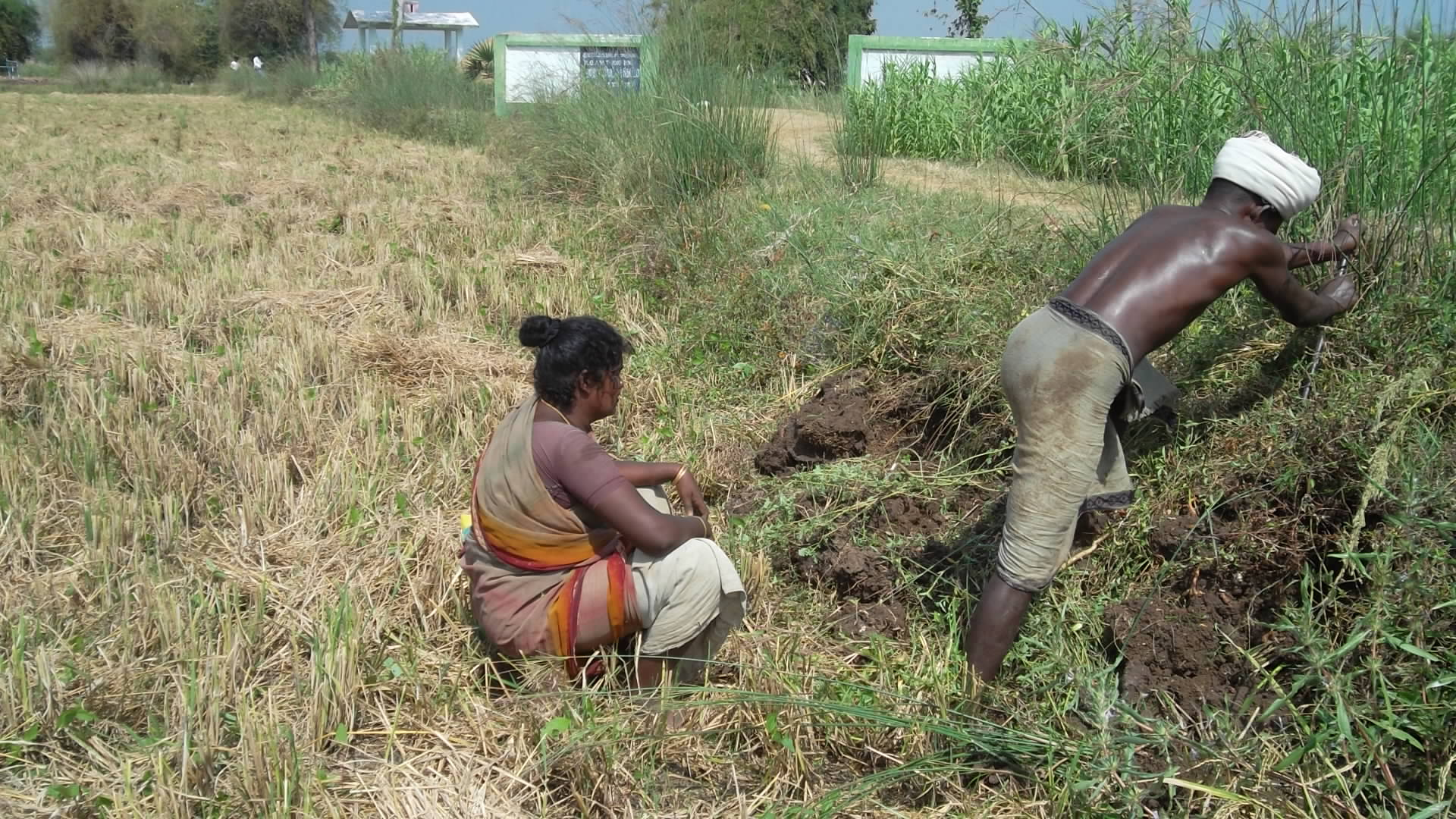
Irula man and woman tilling the soil.

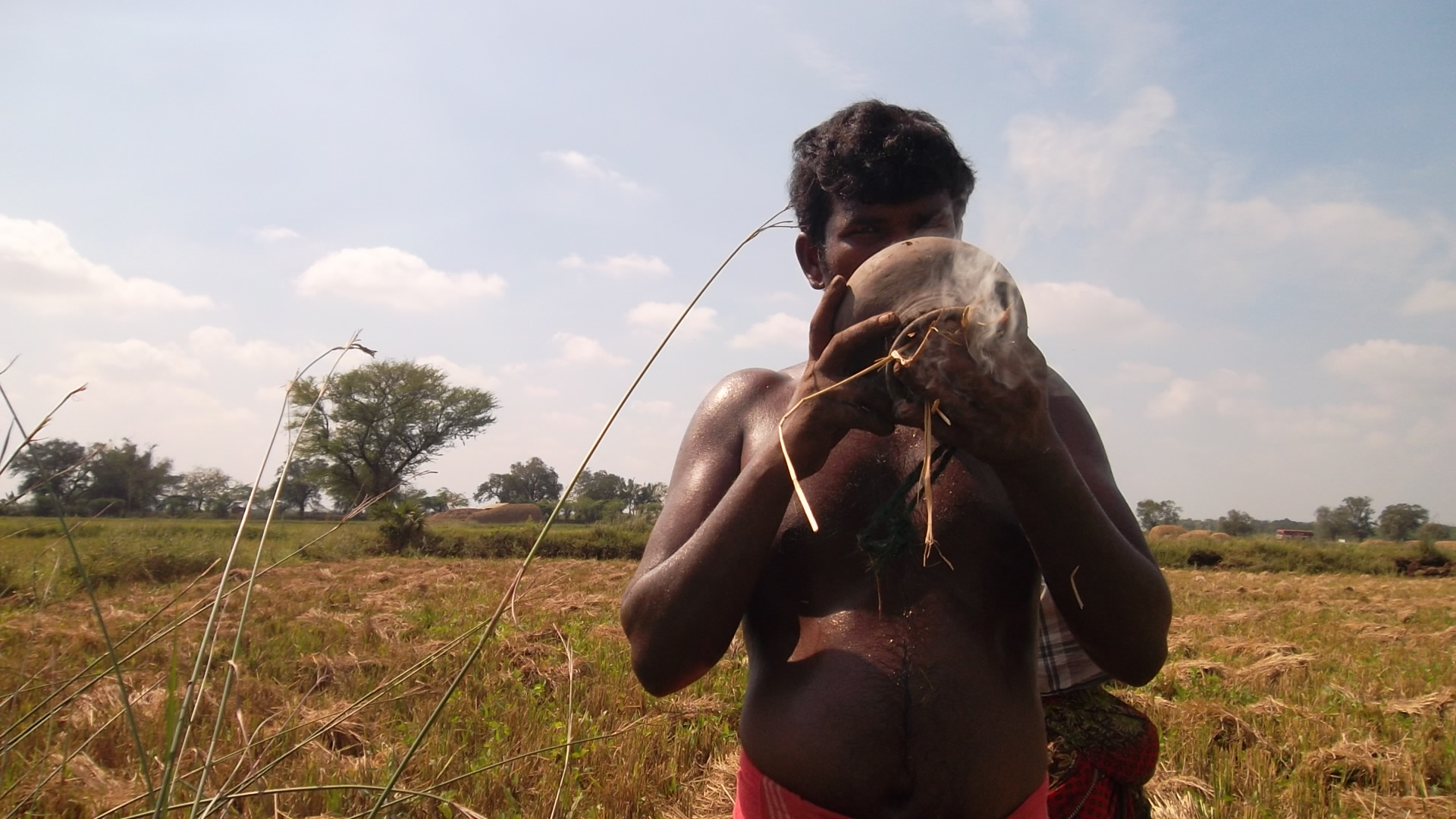
Irala rat catchers, Tamil Nadu

Traditionally, the main occupation of the Irulas has been snake and rat catching, and honey collection. They also work as labourers (coolies) in the fields of the landlords during the sowing and harvesting seasons or in the rice mills. Fishing and cattle farm is also a major occupation.

Rats destroy a quarter of the grain grown on Tamil Nadu-area farms annually. To combat this pest, Irula men use a traditional earthen pot fumigation method. Smoke is blown through their mouths, which leads to severe respiratory and heart problems.

In January 2017, Masi Sadaiyan and Vadivel Gopal from the Irula tribe of Tamil Nadu were brought in, along with two translators, to work with detection dogs to track down and capture invasive Burmese pythons in Key Largo, Florida. The Irula men and their translators were paid $70,000 by the State of Florida, and captured 14 pythons in less than two weeks.

== Caste discrimination ==
Irula people face severe discrimination and harassment from other castes and numerous such cases are reported every year.

- In 2020, a girl named Dhanalaxmi was assaulted and barred from getting a Scheduled Tribe certificate by Vanniyar community in her village.
- In Dharmapuri, Irula people were trashed and urinated upon by a mob who were infuriated by the marriage between an Irular man and a Vanniyar woman.
- In 1993, the Rajakannu Vs. State of Tamil Nadu and Ors. was a case that was fought in the High Court of Judicature at Madras (Madras High Court). It involved the death via torture of an Irular man held in custody for the false charge of theft at the Kammapuram Police Station in the Cuddalore district of Tamil Nadu. Three police officers were charged in the case for murder by the High Court despite the arguments given by prosecution to have the case be done in a Criminal court. The case was fought by K. Chandru and proved to be an important event for the Irular people as it led to the establishment of the பழங்குடி இருளர் பாதுகாப்பு சங்கம் (Eng. Palangudi Irular Pathugaappu Sangam) in 1996, the union is dedicated to the protection of the rights of the Irula people and has fought over 1,000 cases, mostly relating to false charges or Human rights violations.

== See also ==
- Irula Nritham
- Tondaimandalam
- Jai Bhim (film)
