= Jumde Yomgam Gamlin =

Indian social worker

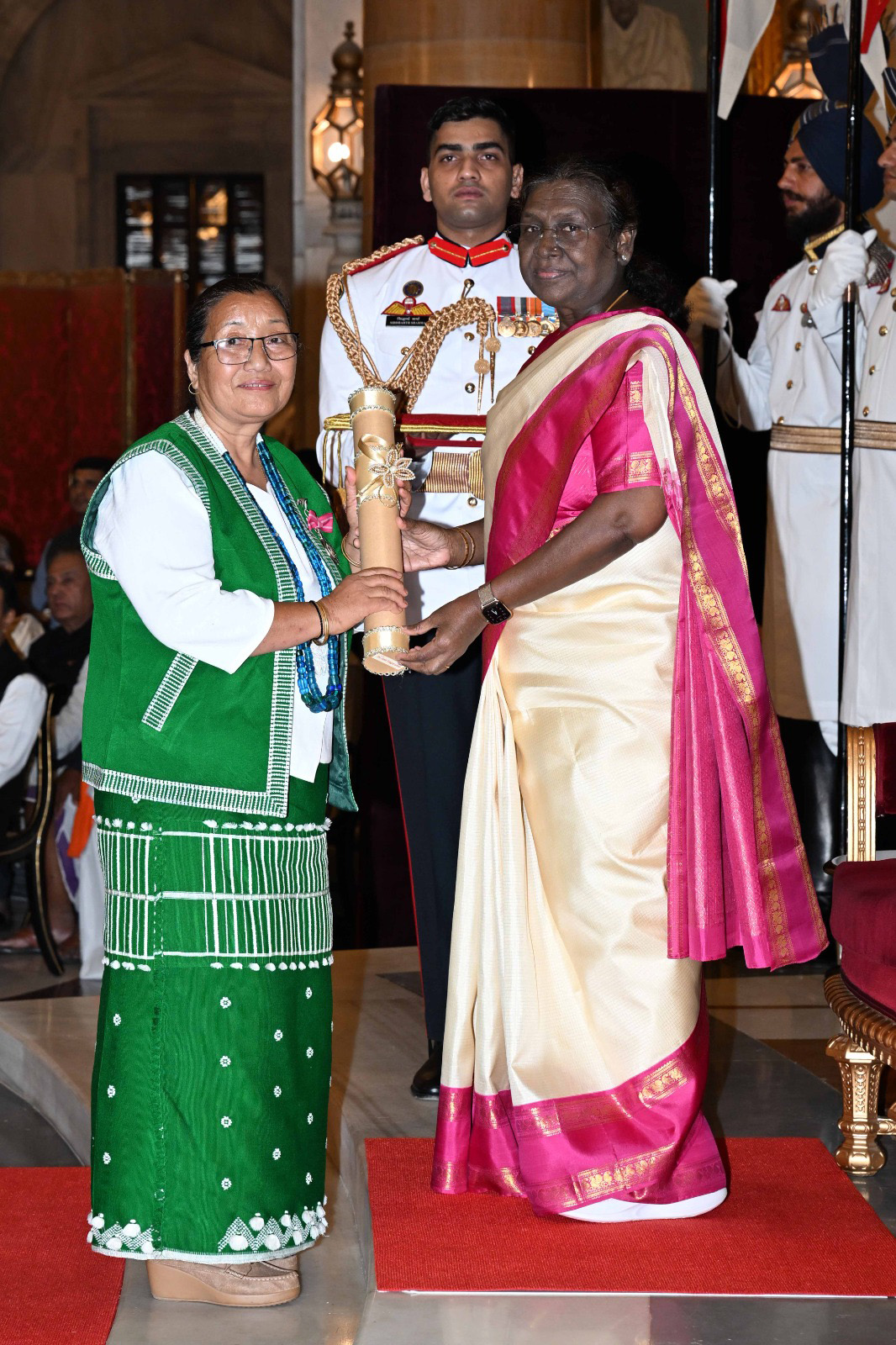
- Gamlin (left) receiving the Padma Shri in 2025
- Born: Arunachal Pradesh, India
- Known for: Social Work
- Awards: Padma Shri

Jumde Yomgam Gamlin is an Indian social worker from Arunachal Pradesh. She was awarded the Padma Shri in 2025 for her contributions to social work.

== Achievements ==
In 2013, she founded Mother's Vision, a non governmental organization focused on drug de addiction and women's empowerment.

Her social work helped eliminate drug cultivation in parts of West Siang district. She empowered over 2,000 women through training and financial aid. Gamlin also serves as a Zila Parishad member.
