= Prem Singh (social worker) =

Indian social worker from Punjab

- Born: 1952 (age 73–74); Ropar district, Punjab
- Occupation: Social worker
- Known for: Work for leprosy-affected persons
- Awards: Padma Shri (2022)

Prem Singh (born c. 1952) is an Indian social worker. He was awarded the Padma Shri, India's fourth-highest civilian award, in 2022 in the field of social service for his contributions to the welfare and rehabilitation of leprosy-affected persons.

== Early life and career ==
Singh was born in Behrampur Zimidari village in Ropar district, Punjab, He is a retired audit officer for Indian Audit and Accounts Department.

Singh has spent decades to the community-based rehabilitation of leprosy-affected individuals and advocating for their human rights. He has advocated for eliminating the social stigma associated with leprosy and facilitating the integration of affected persons into society. His efforts have included establishing shelters and providing support using personal funds, reportedly including his gratuity provident fund and the sale of his house and his wife's ornaments.

== Awards ==
Singh got recognition for his social work, and was awarded the Vayoshrestha Samman National Award in the 'Courage and Bravery' category by the Ministry of Social Justice and Empowerment in 2019. He also received the Padma Shri in 2022.
