= Agumbe =

- village
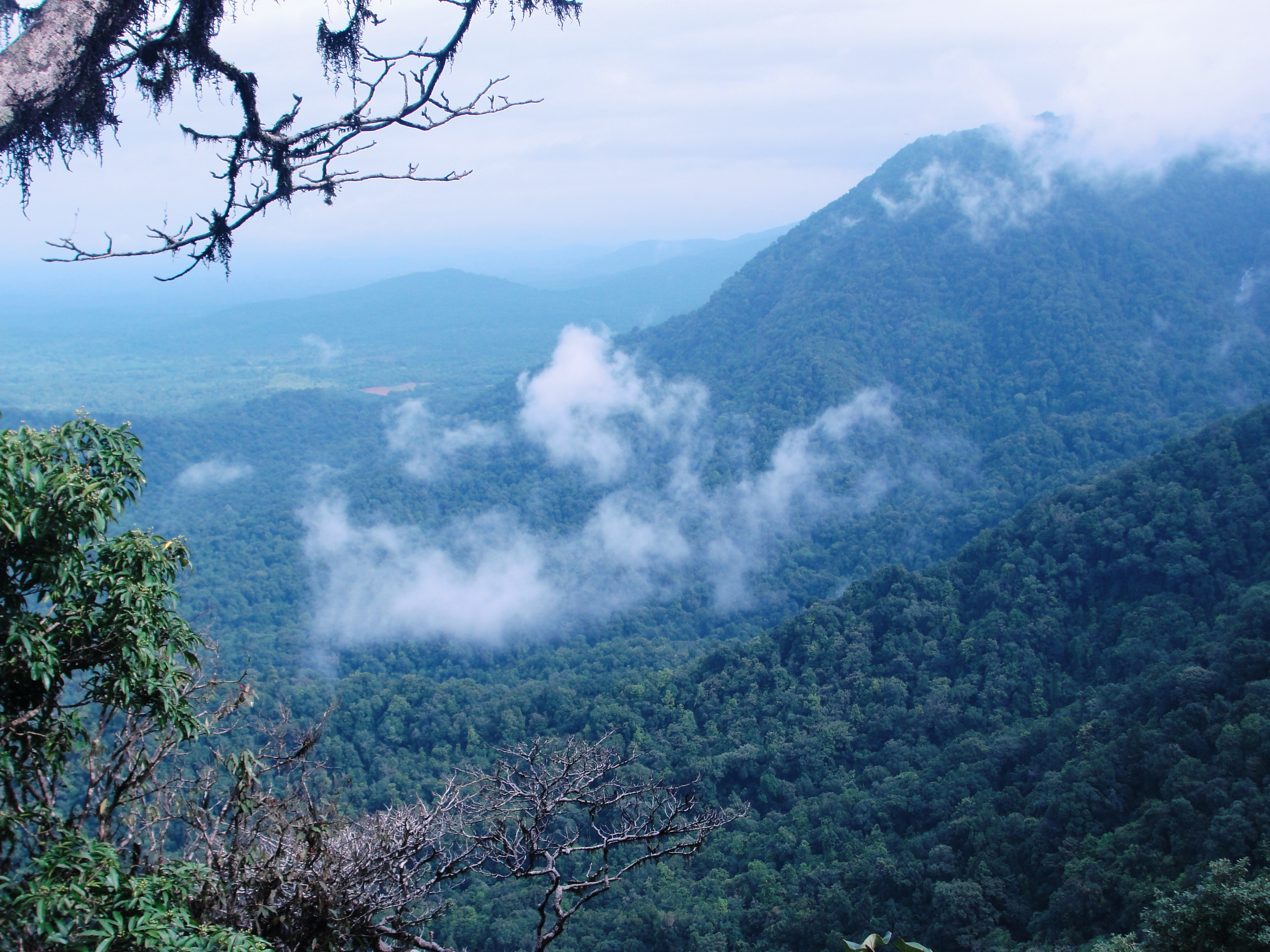
- Clouds at Sunset point, Agumbe
- Nicknames: Cherrapunji of South India, Cherrapunji of Karnataka, Rain City
- Location of Agumbe
- Coordinates: 13.5087°N 75.0959°E
- Country: India
- State: Karnataka
- District: Shimoga district
- Region: Malenadu

Area
  - Total: 3 km^{2} (1.2 sq mi)
- Elevation: 660 m (2,170 ft)

Population
  - Total: 600
  - Density: 200/km^{2} (520/sq mi)

Languages
  - Official: Kannada
- Time zone: UTC+5:30 (IST)
- PIN: 577411
- Telephone code: 08181
- Vehicle registration: KA-14

Agumbe is a village situated in the Thirthahalli taluka of Shivamogga district, Karnataka, India. It is nestled in the thickly forested Malenadu region of the Western Ghats mountain range. Owing to its high rainfall, it has received the epithet of "The Cherrapunji of South India", after Cherrapunji, one of the rainiest places in India.

Agumbe is associated with rainforest conservation efforts, documentation of medicinal plants, tourism (trekking and photography), and the promotion of cottage industry. The Agumbe Rainforest Research Station was established as a sanctuary for the king cobra, Agumbe's flagship species.

== Location ==
Agumbe in Shivamogga district lies on the south-western coast of India, approximately 98 km (61 mi) north-east of Mangaluru and 357 km (222 mi) north-west of Bengaluru, the state capital of Karnataka in Southern India. It is approximately 24 km (15 mi) from Shringeri and 55 km (34 mi) from the Arabian Sea. The coastal town of Udupi hosts the nearest major railway station approximately 50 km (31 mi). The nearest airport is at Bajpe near Mangaluru which lies at a distance of approximately 94 km (58 mi). The elevation of Agumbe is 660 m (2,165 ft) above mean sea level. As part of the Western Ghats mountain range, Agumbe lies in a UNESCO World Heritage Site. Agumbe is near the Someshwara Wildlife Sanctuary and the Kudremukh National Park.

== Size ==
Agumbe is a small hill village with very limited visitor accommodation. The population is approximately 500 people. The village covers an area of 3 square kilometres (1.2 sq mi).

== Economy ==
The villagers of Agumbe are subsistence farmers. Rice and areca are grown. The Raksha Kavacha Weavers' Cooperative Society represents the beginnings of cottage industry in the village.

=== Tourism ===
Places in the vicinity of Agumbe that tourists visit include the Kundadri and Kodachadri Hills, Udupi, Malpe, Mangalore (for the airport and seaport), Karkala, Kolluru, Sringeri, Chickmagaluru, Shivamogga, Bhadravathi, N.R. Pura, Sagar, Hosanagar, Koppa and Thirthahalli. In the summer, a truck can be used to reach Narasimha parvata

Sunset Point

Sunset View Point rests on one of the highest peaks of the Western Ghats on the Udupi-Agumbe Road. It is ten minutes walk from Agumbe. On a fine evening, the sunset can be seen over the Arabian Sea.

== Climate ==
Agumbe hosts India's first automatic weather station, founded by Romulus Whitaker b. 1943, New York, NY. Agumbe lies in a rainforest region with a tropical climate, warm and humid. Under the Köppen system of climate classification Agumbe is an 'Am' climate, that is, a tropical monsoon climate. A dense silvery fog forms over the Western Ghats at Agumbe.

=== Rainfall ===
The driest month in Agumbe is February with an average rainfall of 1 mm. The wettest month is July with an average rainfall of 2,647 mm. The mean annual rainfall is 7,620 millimetres (300 in). The highest recorded rainfall in a single month was 4,508 millimetres (177.5 in) in August 1946.

The table below is comparison of rainfalls for between Agumbe in Thirthahalli taluk in Shimoga district, Hulikal in Hosanagara taluk in Shimoga district, Amagaon in Khanapur Taluk in Belgaum district and Talacauvery in Madikeri taluk in Kodagu district, Kokalli of Sirsi Taluk, Nilkund of Siddapur Taluk, CastleRock of Supa (Joida) Taluk in Uttara Kannada District to show which one can be called the "Cherrapunji of South India".

Year	Hulikal Rainfall (mm)	Agumbe Rainfall (mm)	Amagaon Rainfall (mm)	Talacauvery Rainfall (mm)	Kokalli(Sirsi) Rainfall (mm)	Nilkund Rainfall (mm)	Castle Rock Rainfall (mm)
2024	8606	8639					
2023	5208	5353	4389	4892		4891	
2022	7733	8122	6825	8763		5864	
2021	7937	7544	6462	7879		5637	6536
2020	8401	7560	7496	8856		5909	7152
2019	8541	7398	9804	7593		6705	8069
2018	7577	8422	6570	9098	3944	6204	6501
2017	5,700	6,311	4,733	5,859	3130	4981	5560
2016	5,721	6,449	4,705	5,430	2682	4655	4968
2015	6,035	5,518	4,013	5,319	2730	4367	3667
2014	7,907	7,917	5,580	7,844	8746	6710	5956
2013	9,383	8,770	8,440	8,628	4464	7082	6165
2012	8,409	6,933	5,987	5,722	5036	5398	4930
2011	8,523	7,921	9,368	6,855	4437	6593	7083
2010	7,717	6,929	10,068	6,794	4002	-	4079
2009	8,357	7,982	-	-	-	-	-
2008	7,115	7,199	-	-	-	-	-
2007	8295	8,255	-	-	-	-	-
2006	8,656	8691	-	-	-	-	-
2005		7095					
2004		7113					
2003		6059					
2002		6115					
2001		7089					
2000		7233					

=== Temperature ===
Maximum temperatures in Agumbe vary between 24.4 and 31.5 °C. Minimum temperatures vary between 16.2 °C and 21.4 °C. Average temperatures vary between 22.2 °C and 23.6 °C with an annual average temperature of 23.5 °C. April is the hottest month of the year and December the coolest. The average annual variation in temperature is 4.1 °C. The lowest recorded temperature was 3.2 °C in 1975 and the highest, 37 °C in 2008–2009.

Climate data for Agumbe (1981–2010, extremes 1951–2012)
Month	Jan	Feb	Mar	Apr	May	Jun	Jul	Aug	Sep	Oct	Nov	Dec	Year
Record high °C (°F)	34.5 (94.1)	36.5 (97.7)	38.0 (100.4)	36.5 (97.7)	35.0 (95.0)	33.0 (91.4)	30.5 (86.9)	31.2 (88.2)	34.0 (93.2)	32.0 (89.6)	32.5 (90.5)	33.0 (91.4)	38.0 (100.4)
Mean daily maximum °C (°F)	29.4 (84.9)	30.3 (86.5)	31.3 (88.3)	31.4 (88.5)	30.0 (86.0)	25.6 (78.1)	23.7 (74.7)	23.7 (74.7)	25.5 (77.9)	27.4 (81.3)	28.5 (83.3)	29.0 (84.2)	28.0 (82.4)
Mean daily minimum °C (°F)	11.4 (52.5)	12.3 (54.1)	14.8 (58.6)	17.6 (63.7)	18.7 (65.7)	18.0 (64.4)	17.6 (63.7)	17.7 (63.9)	17.4 (63.3)	17.1 (62.8)	14.9 (58.8)	12.1 (53.8)	15.8 (60.4)
Record low °C (°F)	3.2 (37.8)	4.0 (39.2)	4.7 (40.5)	8.2 (46.8)	10.2 (50.4)	10.7 (51.3)	10.0 (50.0)	10.0 (50.0)	10.0 (50.0)	8.7 (47.7)	6.5 (43.7)	3.7 (38.7)	3.2 (37.8)
Average rainfall mm (inches)	3.8 (0.15)	2.2 (0.09)	10.6 (0.42)	34.8 (1.37)	181.0 (7.13)	1,617.3 (63.67)	2,432.2 (95.76)	2,145.8 (84.48)	672.0 (26.46)	289.2 (11.39)	78.5 (3.09)	15.1 (0.59)	7,482.3 (294.58)
Average rainy days	0.4	0.1	0.8	2.4	7.7	25.2	30.0	29.1	20.2	12.3	4.2	0.8	133.1
Average relative humidity (%) (at 17:30 IST)	67	68	74	78	81	92	95	95	92	88	79	70	82
Source: India Meteorological Department

== Ecology and biodiversity ==
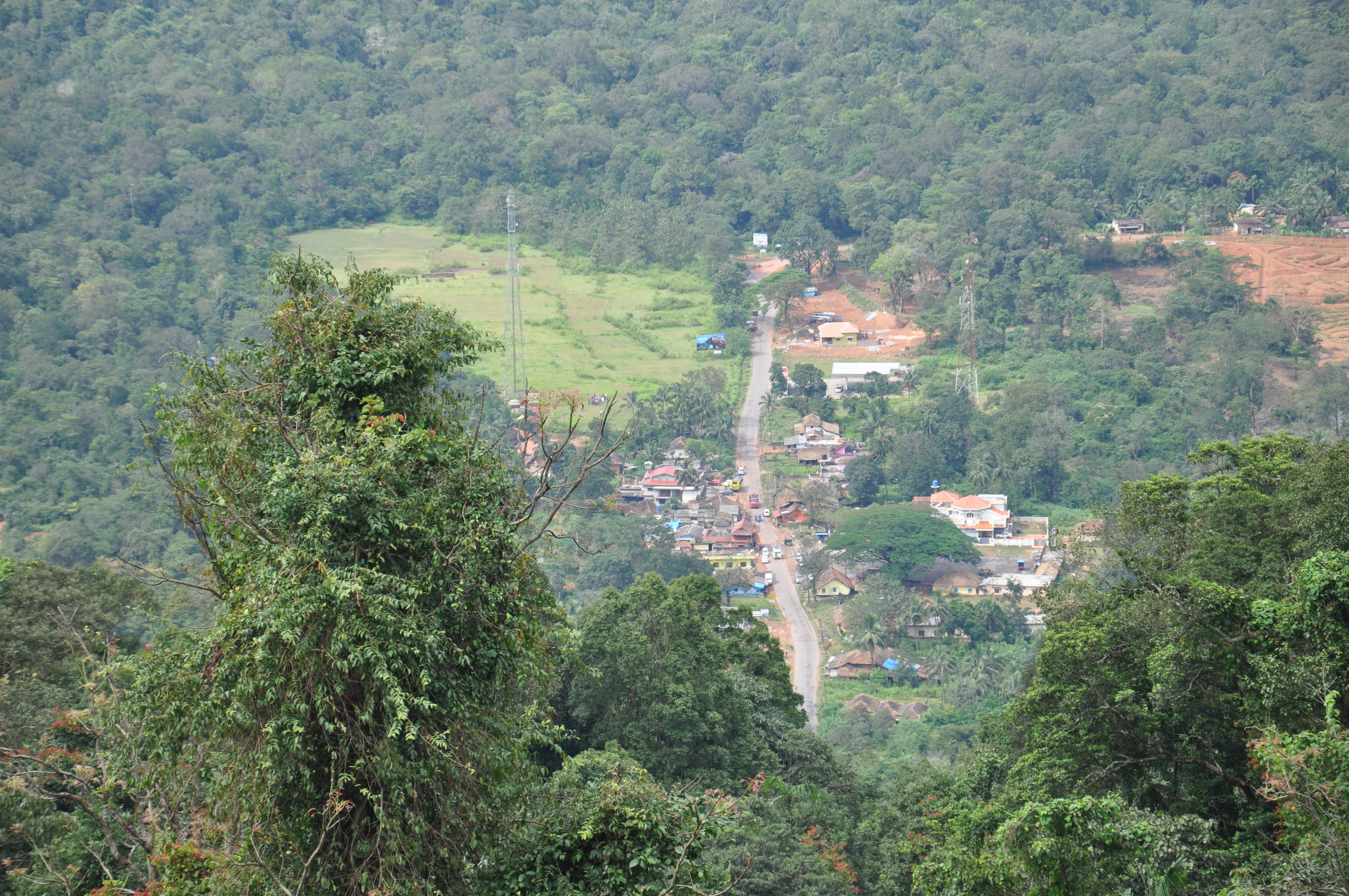
Someshwara (Udupi dist.) below Agumbe

Fog filled valley, Sunset point

Rainforest is a dense, wet, tropical evergreen ecosystem, high in its level of biodiversity. According to the 'Champion and Seth' classification, Agumbe is an area of "Southern tropical wet evergreen forests" (1A/C4). R.S. Troup, an eminent forester of his day, said,

"The tropical evergreen rain forests are characterised by the great luxuriance of their vegetation which consists of several tiers, the highest containing lofty trees...covered by numerous epiphytes"

=== Agumbe rainforest research station ===
The Agumbe Rainforest Research Station was founded in 2005 by Romulus Whitaker, a herpetologist. Whitaker had been familiar with Agumbe since the 1970s when he began studying the King Cobra. Its purpose is to create a local biodiversity database, encourage individual scientific research, collaborate with India's Department of Forestry and conserve the rainforest of the Western Ghats as well as to educate the residents of the region in the importance of forestry conservation. The King Cobra, an endangered species is the station's "flagship species". The station occupies an area of 8 acres (32,000 m^{2}). Funding for the station came from Whitaker's mother, Doris Norden and from the Whitley Award received by Whitaker in 2005.

=== Medicinal plants conservation area ===
The Agumbe Medicinal Plants Conservation Area was established in 1999 to protect the important medicinal plants of the region. The "Foundation for Revitalisation of Local Health Traditions" recorded 371 plant species at Agumbe, of which 182 were medicinal.

=== Flora ===
Endangered plant species

Endangered plant species in the area include

- Dipterocarpus indicus
- Dysoxylum malabaricum
- Calophyllum apetalum
- Garcinia indica
- Garcinia gummi-gutta
- Myristica dactyloides
- Vateria indica
- Aristolochia tagala
- Tarenna agumbensis
- Adenia hondala
- Celastrus paniculatus
- Persea macrantha

Plant species named for Agumbe

- Meliola agumbensis - fungus
- Tarenna agumbensis - shrub
- Hygroaster agumbensis - mushroom
- Dactylaria agumbensis- fungus
- Impatiens agumbeana- plant

Other plant species discovered at Agumbe

- Caudalejeunea pluriplicata - liverwort
- Notothylas dissecta - Hornwort

orchids of attraction

- rhynchostylis retusa
- aerides crispa
- aerides maculosa
- aerides ringens
- Oberonia brunoniana
- Oberonia elisiformis
- Oberonia bicornis
- dendrobium ovatum
- Dendrobium nanum
- dendrobium heyneanum
- dendrobium macrostachyum
- Dendrobium nodosum
- robiquetia josephiana
- robiquetia rosea
- dendrobium lawianum
- epipogium roseum
- Luisia tenuifolium
- Luisia macrantha
- Coelogyne breviscapa
- pholidota pallida
- Gastrochilus flabelliformis
- Odisha cleistantha
- Habenaria heyneana
- Habenaria grandifloriformis
- Pinalia mysorensis
- Habenaria crinifera
- Cleisostoma tenuifolium
- Cottonia peduncularis
- sirhookera lanceoleta
- Diploprora championii
- Zeuxine longilabris
- Porpax exilis
- porpax reticulata
- Porpax jerdoniana
- Porpax filiformis
- peristylus aristatus
- smithsonia maculata
- smithsonia viridiflora
- Smithsonia straminea
- Nervilia plicata
- Nervilia crociformis
- Vanilla planifolia
- Zeuxine gracilis
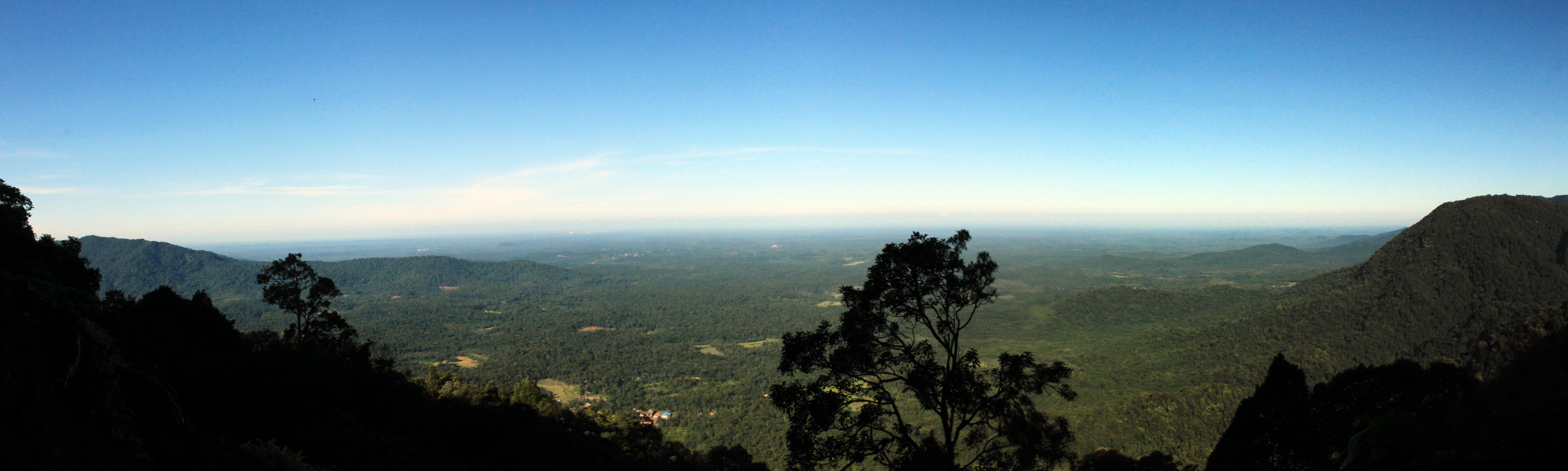
A Panorama of Agumbe

=== Fauna ===
Mammals

Agumbe provides an environment for large and small mammals such as the endangered lion-tailed macaque, tiger, leopard, sambar, giant squirrel, dhole, a wild dog of India, gaur, the Indian bison and barking deer.

Reptiles and amphibians

In creating funds for conservation of the Agumbe rainforest, the Ophiophagus hannah, king cobra is a 'flagship' species. An Agumbe-based scientific project to radio-locate rescued king cobras aims to determine whether relocation is helpful to their survival. other reptiles and amphibians of the area include the cane turtle and a flying lizard.

Birds

Agumbe is a popular destination for bird watchers and photographers. Among the endemic birds are the Malabar trogon, the yellow-browed bulbul and Sri Lankan frogmouths.

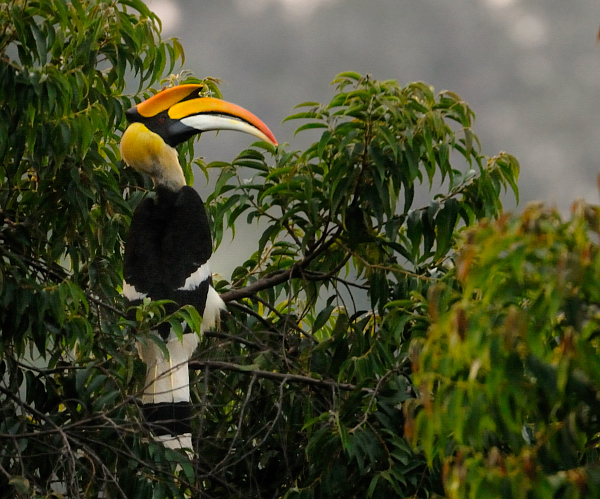
Great Hornbill

Insects and marine species

Agumbe's many insect species include the Atlas moth, Cyclotoma alleni (a beetle discovered in Agumbe), Selenops agumbensis, a spider and Drosophila agumbensis a small fly species. Cremnoconchus agumbensis is a local small fresh water snail.

== Malgudi Days ==
Malgudi Days (1985) is a television serial directed by Shankar Nag. It was based on novels written by R. K. Narayan. Many episodes were filmed in Agumbe. In 2004, a new set of episodes of Malgudi Days was filmed at Agumbe by Kavitha Lankesh (director).

== See also ==
- Mangalore
- Thirthahalli
- Udupi
- Shimoga
- Sringeri
