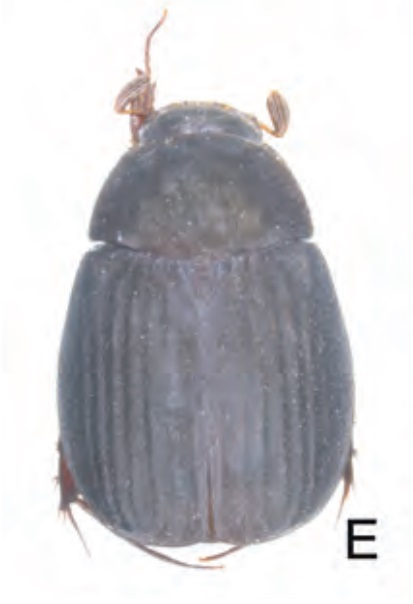

Scientific classification
- Kingdom: Animalia
- Phylum: Arthropoda
- Class: Insecta
- Order: Coleoptera
- Suborder: Polyphaga
- Infraorder: Scarabaeiformia
- Family: Scarabaeidae
- Genus: Neoserica
- Species: N. agumbeensis

Binomial name
- Neoserica agumbeensis Ahrens & Fabrizi, 2016

= Neoserica agumbeensis =

Species of beetle

Neoserica agumbeensis is a species of beetle of the family Scarabaeidae. It is found in India (Karnataka).

== Description ==
Adults reach a length of about 6.4 mm. They have a black, oval body, but the antennae are dark brown. The dorsal surface is dull and glabrous, except for some hairs on the head.

== Etymology ==
The species is named for its type locality, Agumbe Ghat.
