= Agumbe Rainforest Research Station =

Indian conservation organisation

Coordinates: 13.5181141°N 75.0888169°E

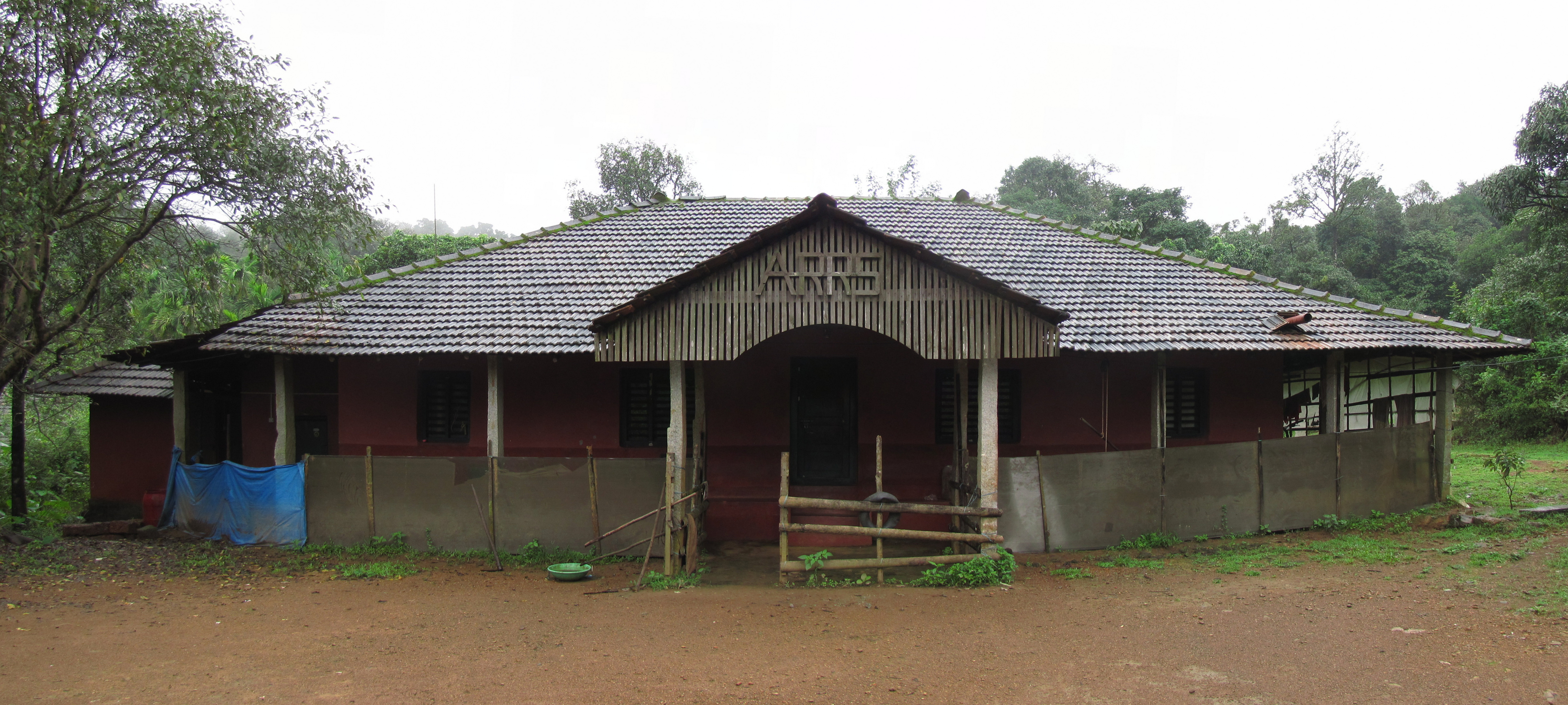
Agumbe Rainforest Research Station

The Agumbe Rainforest Research Station (ARRS) is a field based conservation and research organisation situated inside the Agumbe Reserved Forest at Agumbe in the central Western Ghats of southern India. The Agumbe Reserved Forests receives an annual rainfall in excess of 7,000 mm (280 in) and is at an elevation of about 823 m (2,700 ft) above sea level. It forms a part of the Malnad-Kodagu corridor, which also includes the Someshwara, Mookambika, Bhadra, and Sharavati Wildlife Sanctuaries, Kudremukh National Park, and various other forest tracts and reserve forests around Kundapur, Shankaranarayana, Hosanagara, Sringeri, and Thirthahalli.

== History ==
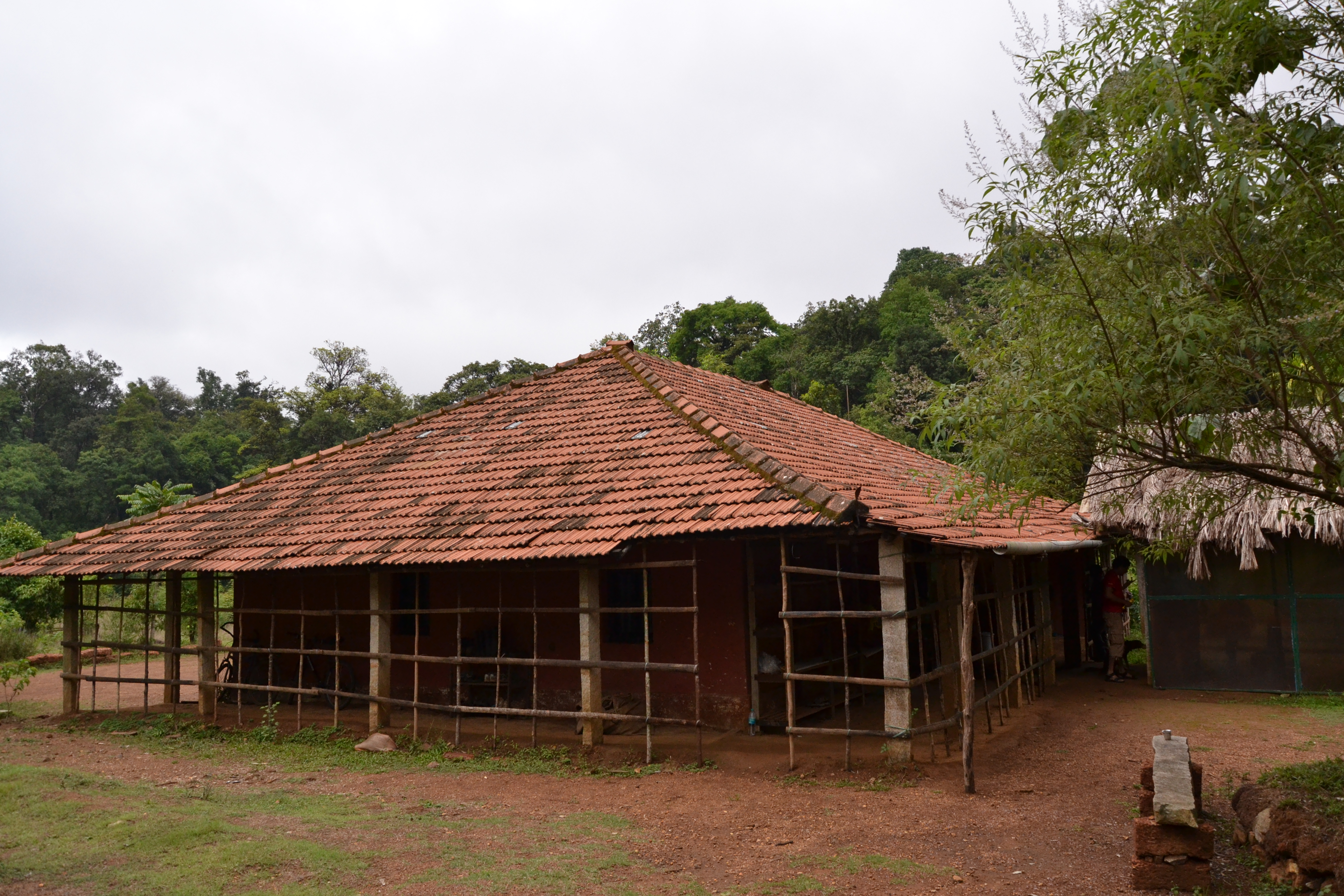
Kalinga Mane at ARRS. It was the first building at ARRS. Others were later added

ARRS was founded in 2005, by leading Indian herpetologist Romulus Whitaker. Whitaker saw his very first king cobra (Ophiophagus Kaalinga) here in 1971. He was also extremely taken by the reverence the people in the region showed for snakes, which was a major factor that drove him to establish a research station in Agumbe (Karnataka ). The land is a revenue land was legally procured, the construction and activities are eco friendly and pose no disturbance to the wildlife.

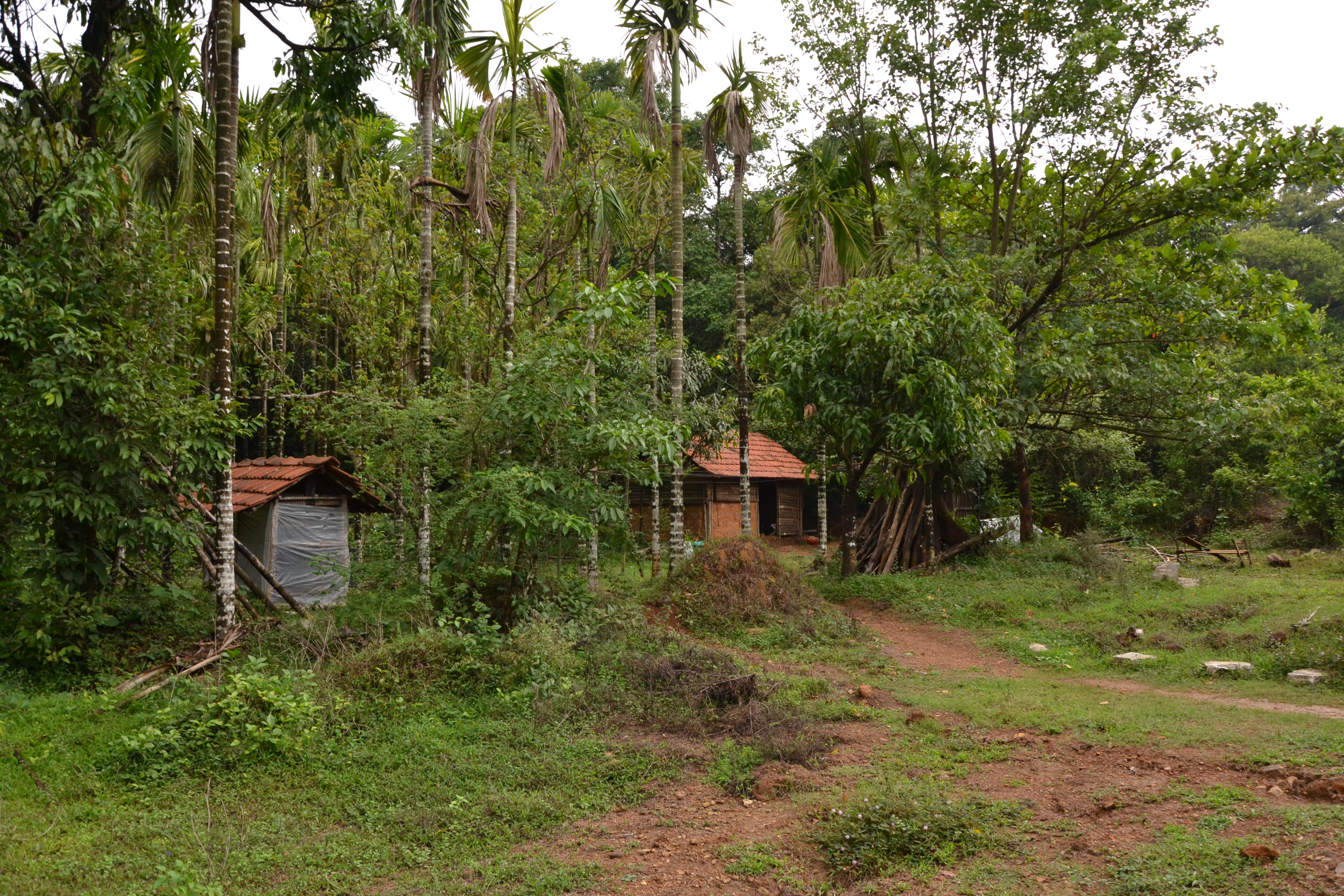
The cottages at ARRS for volunteers and researchers

== Activities ==
ARRS managed the world's first radio-telemetry project on the King Cobra (Ophiophagus hannah, Ophiophagus kalinga), which is also the first radio-telemetry study done on any snake in India. Insight gained from this ecological study is being put into practice into king cobra management in the region. ARRS researchers have witnessed various unique behaviors among the species including a male king cobra killing a possibly pregnant female, a rare behavior even among mammals.

ARRS conducts and facilitates a wide variety of research projects, ranging from rainforest ecology, behavioral and population ecology, phenology, geoinformatics and socio economics. Apart from research, ARRS focuses on education and outreach in the local community, schools and colleges. A well-developed volunteer and research intern programme makes the research station an ideal location for those interested in field based research and conservation The research station encourages and provides facilities for graduate and PHD students to conduct projects.

== See also ==
- Madras Crocodile Bank Trust
