= Kundadri =

Hill in India

- Kannada: ಕುಂದಾದ್ರಿ
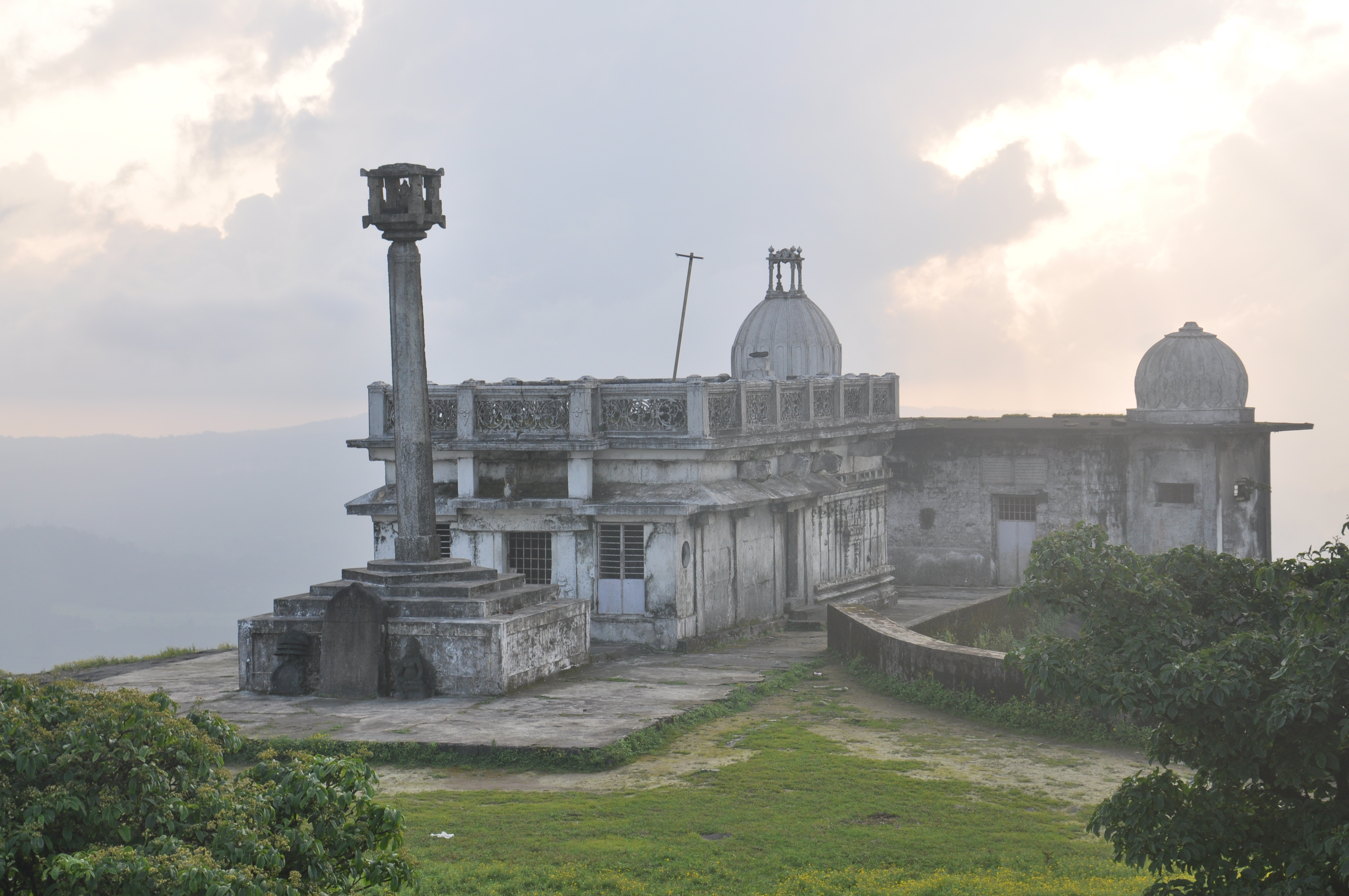
- Kundadri Hill

Highest point
- Elevation: 826 m (2,710 ft)
- Coordinates: 13°33′27″N 75°10′13″E

Geography
- Location within Karnataka

Kundadri is a hill (826 mt) with dense forests in the Western Ghats located in Shimoga District, Karnataka State, India. It is 70 km from Udupi city. This hill is known for a 17th-century Jain temple dedicated to Parshwanath tirthankara and the place is known to have given shelter to Acharya Kundakunda during earlier centuries. The main deity of this temple is Parshwanatha, the 23rd Tirthankara. Two small ponds formed by the rock on one side of this temple provided water to earlier sages. The government of Karnataka joined hands with a philanthropist from Mumbai to construct an all-weather road to the top of the hill.

== History ==
More than two thousand years ago, the greatest Digambar Jain muni named Kundakunda Acharya stayed here and prompted the birth of this jain holy place. A temple is constructed with stone statues of jain sages. As the place is secluded, there has been efforts to damage stone statues to find hidden treasure.

== Transportation ==
Kundadri is at a distance of about 80 km. from the district headquarters, Shimoga and about 20 km from Thirthahalli town. From Shimoga, one has to take the National Highway NH-13 (Thirthahalli road) to reach Thirthahalli. Then take State Highway SH-1 (Agumbe Road) up to Guddekeri and then take left deviation. The total distance from Bangalore to Thirthahalli is 332 km. From Mangalore, one can take NH-13 to reach Thirthahalli. The distance from Mangalore to Thirthahalli is around 146 km. There are numerous mini-buses from Udupi to Thirthahalli. From Udupi railway station 86 km to Thirthahalli. The nearest railway station is in Shimoga. The nearest airport is Mangalore International Airport.

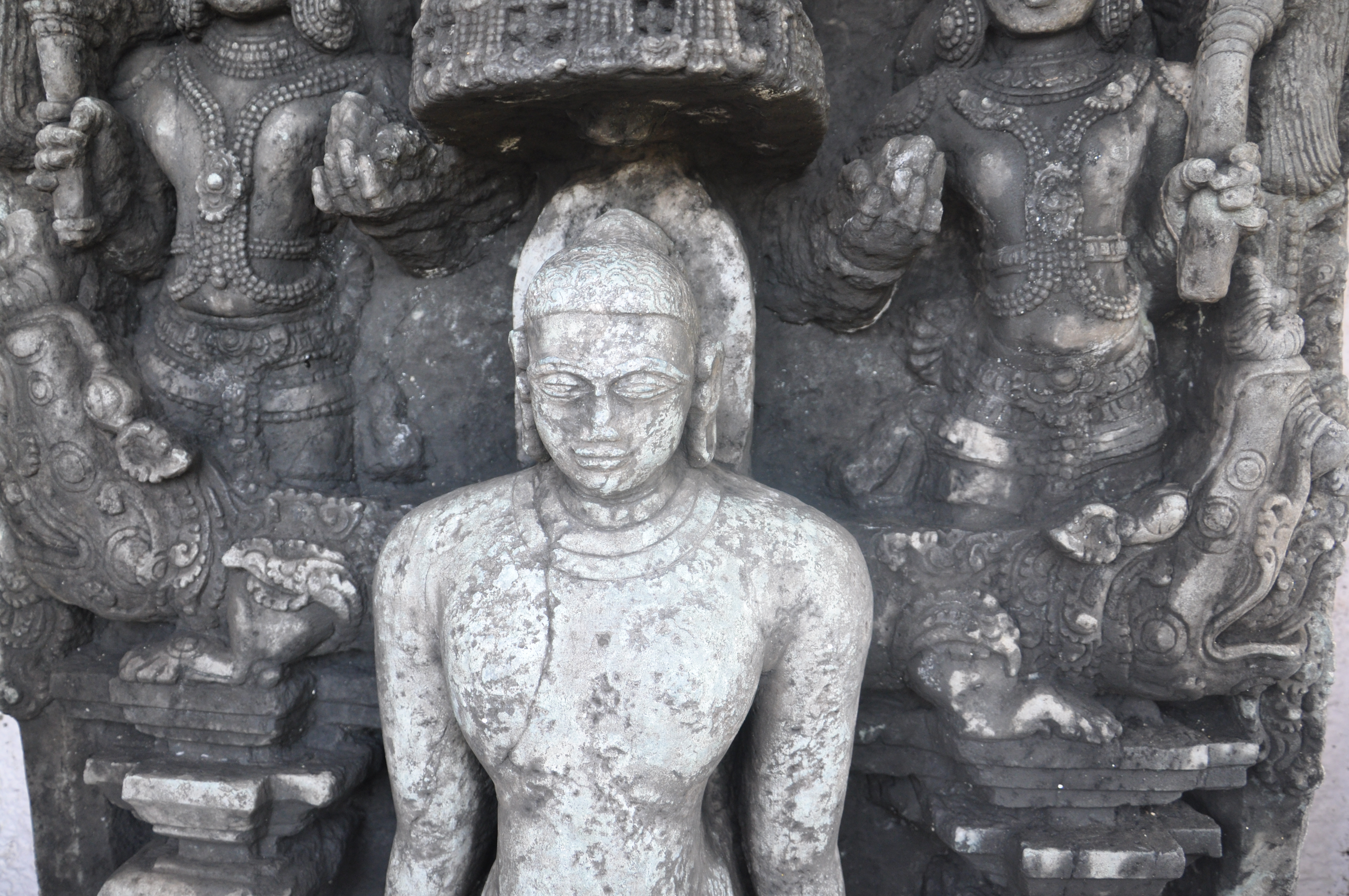
Sculpture

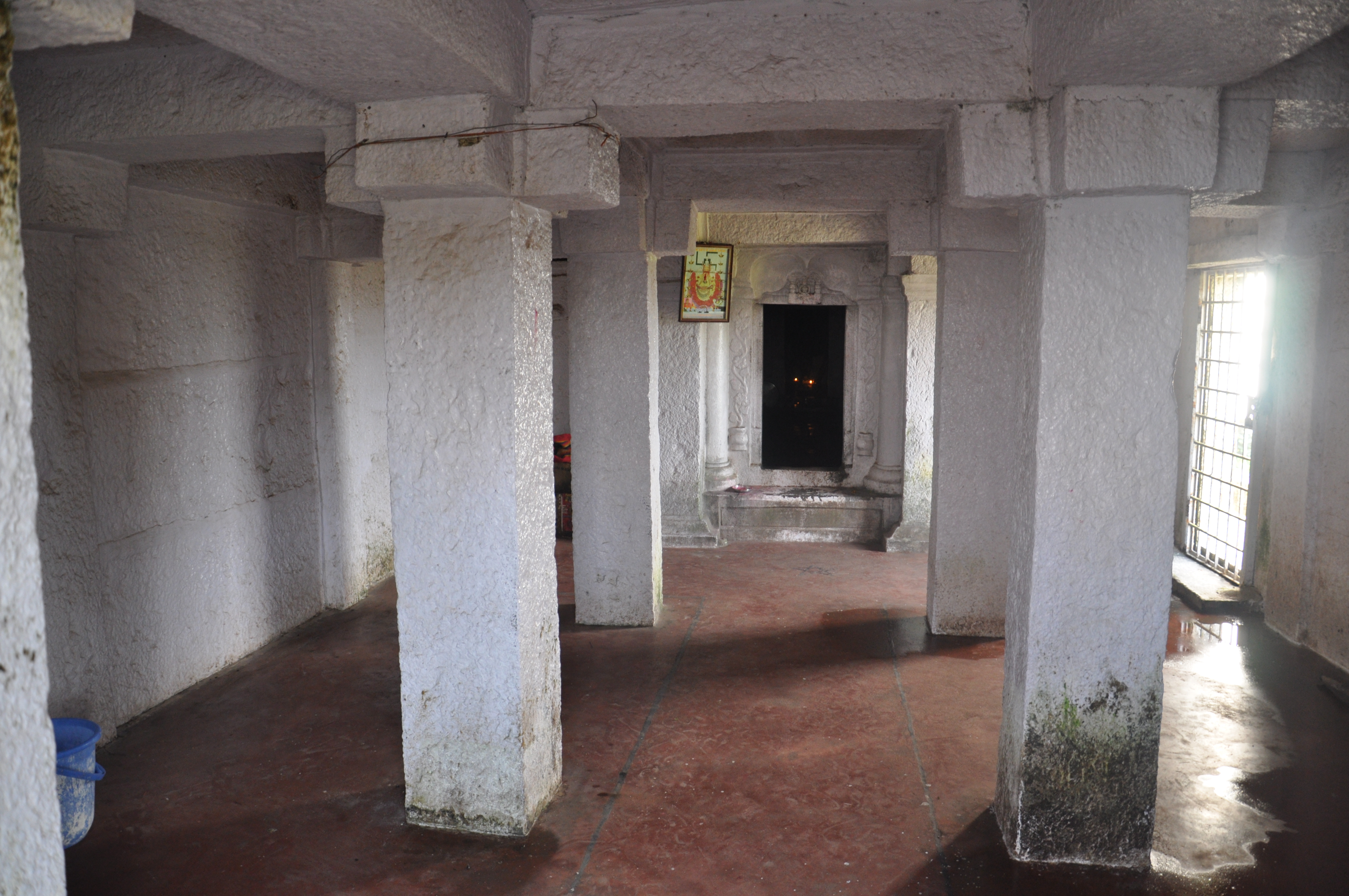
Inside View

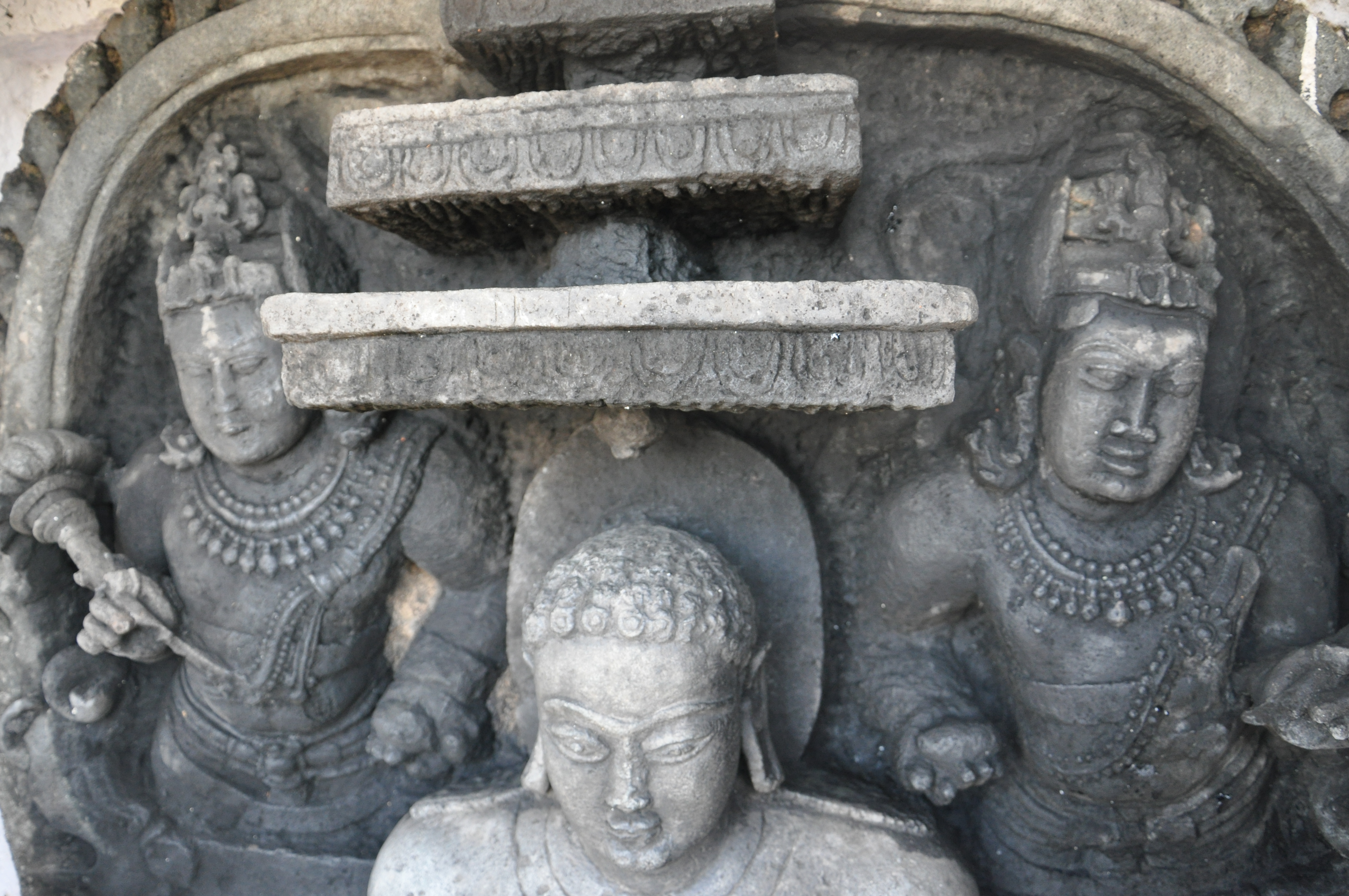
Sculpture

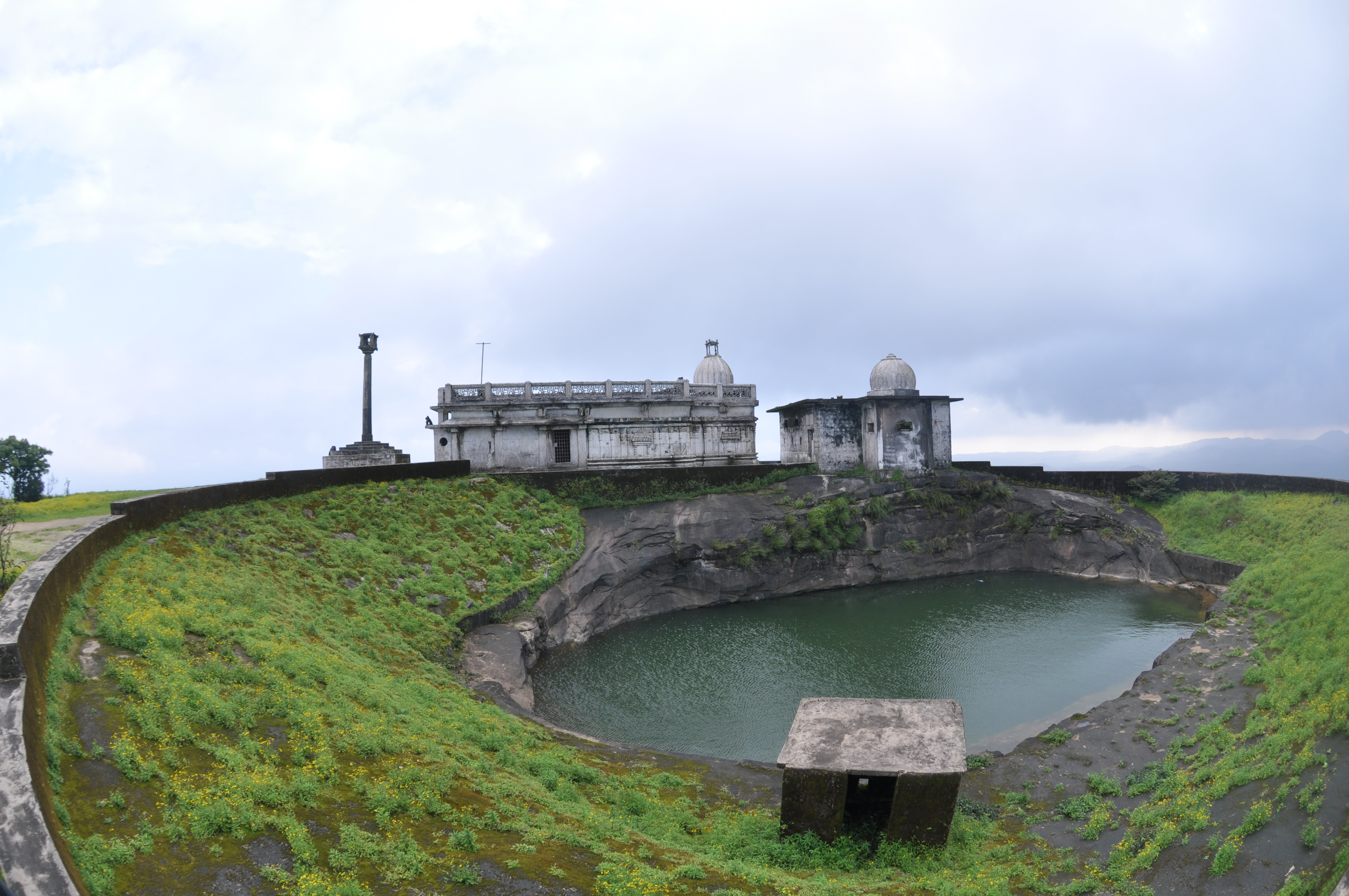
Wide View

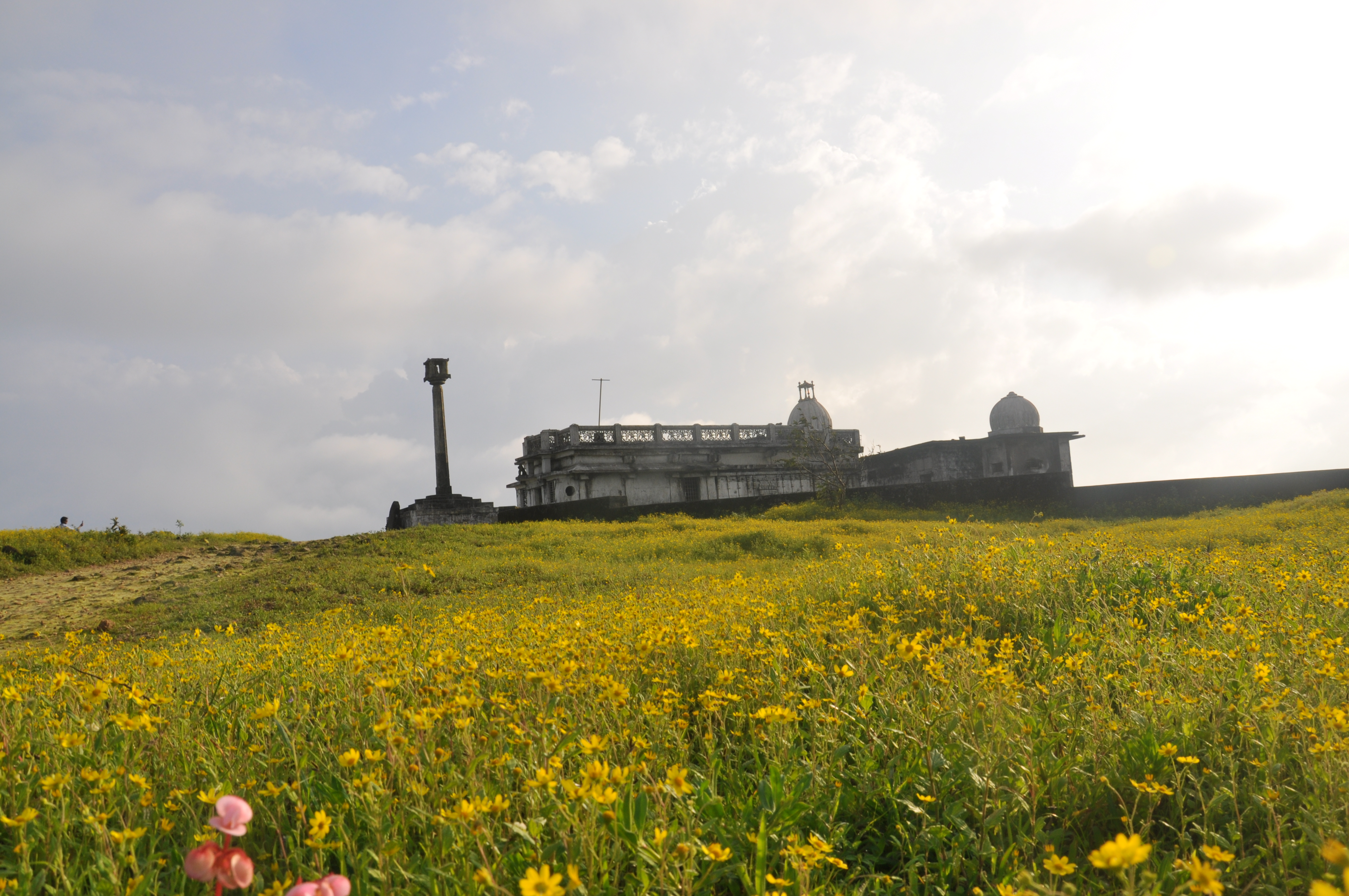
Temple

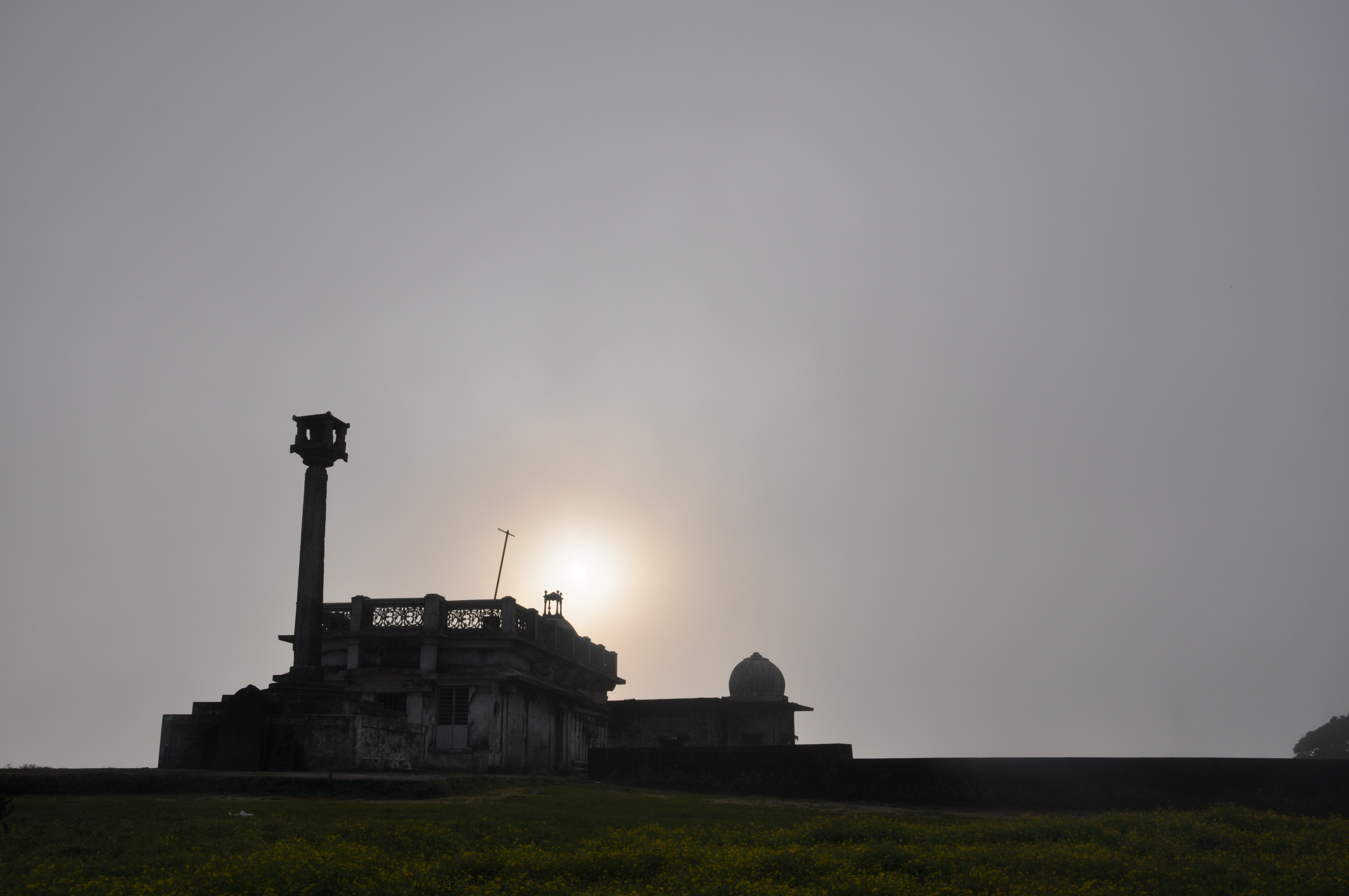
Sunset View

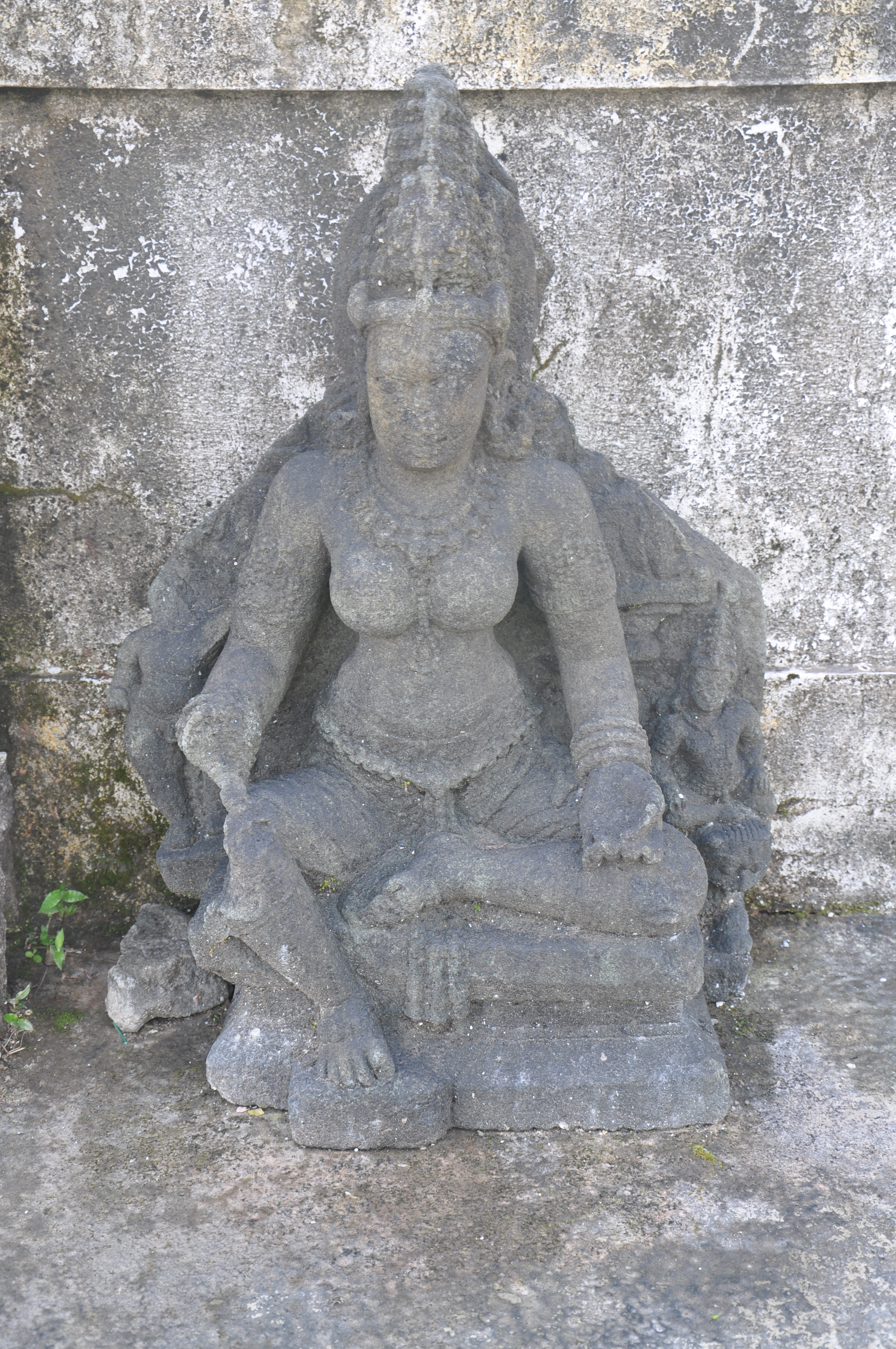
Jain Temple

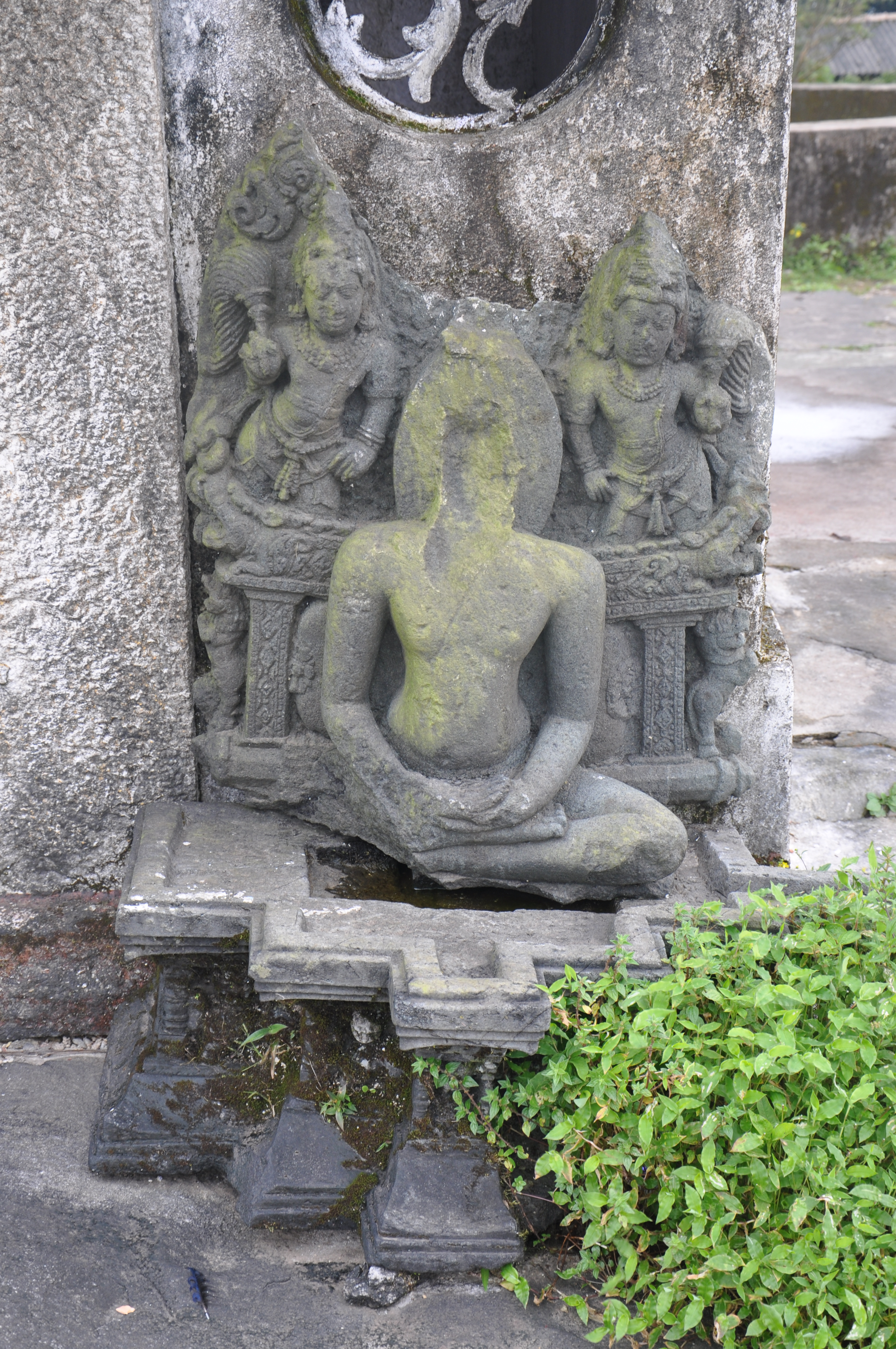
Jain Temple

== See also ==
- Jainism in Karnataka
