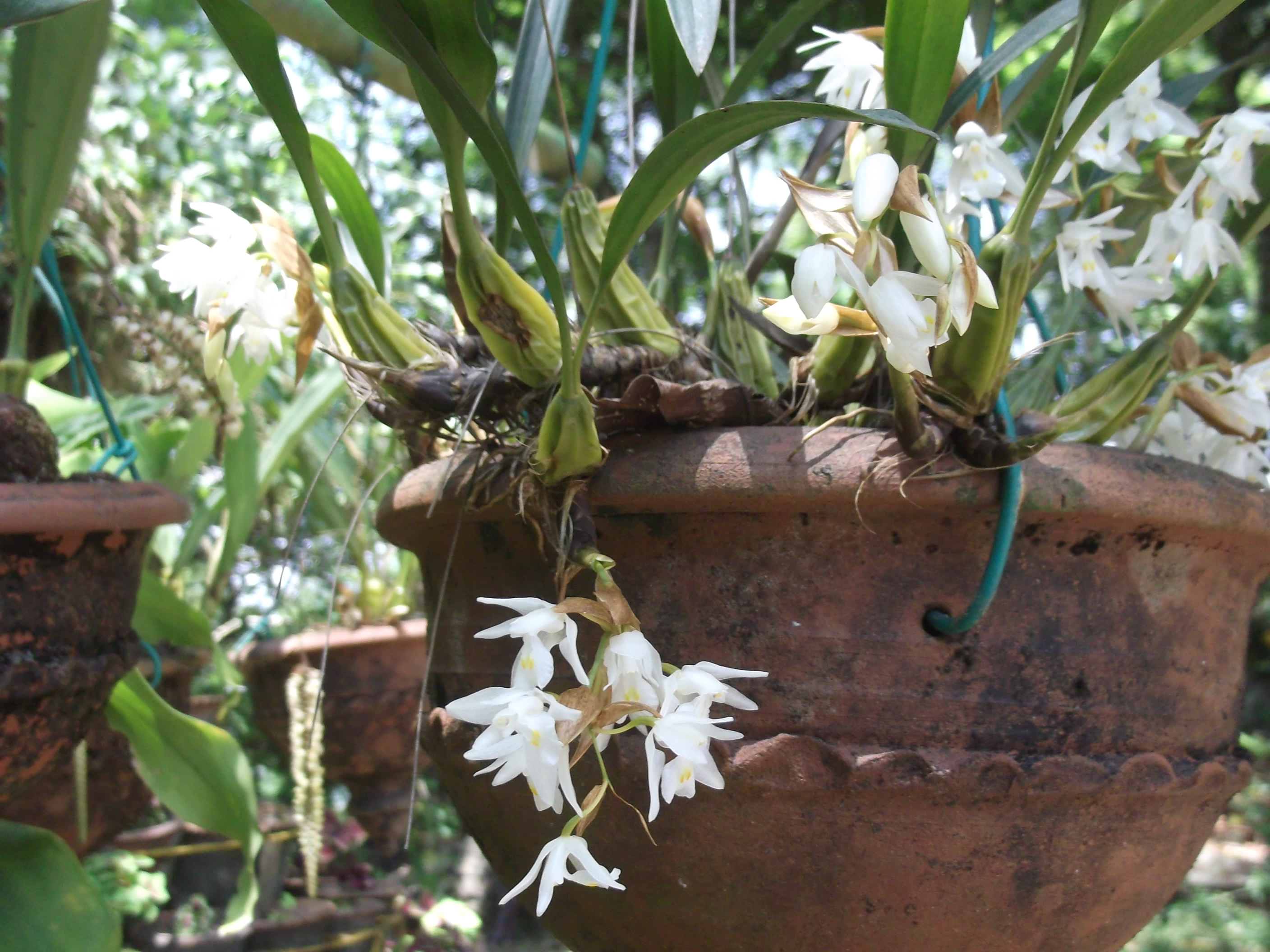

Scientific classification
- Kingdom: Plantae
- Clade: Tracheophytes
- Clade: Angiosperms
- Clade: Monocots
- Order: Asparagales
- Family: Orchidaceae
- Subfamily: Epidendroideae
- Tribe: Arethuseae
- Genus: Coelogyne
- Species: C. breviscapa

Binomial name
- Coelogyne breviscapa Lindl.

= Coelogyne breviscapa =

Species of orchid

Coelogyne breviscapa is a species of orchid in the genus Coelogyne. It is a small epiphytic/lithopytic orchid that grows in humid environments in the Western Ghats of India, and in Sri Lanka.
