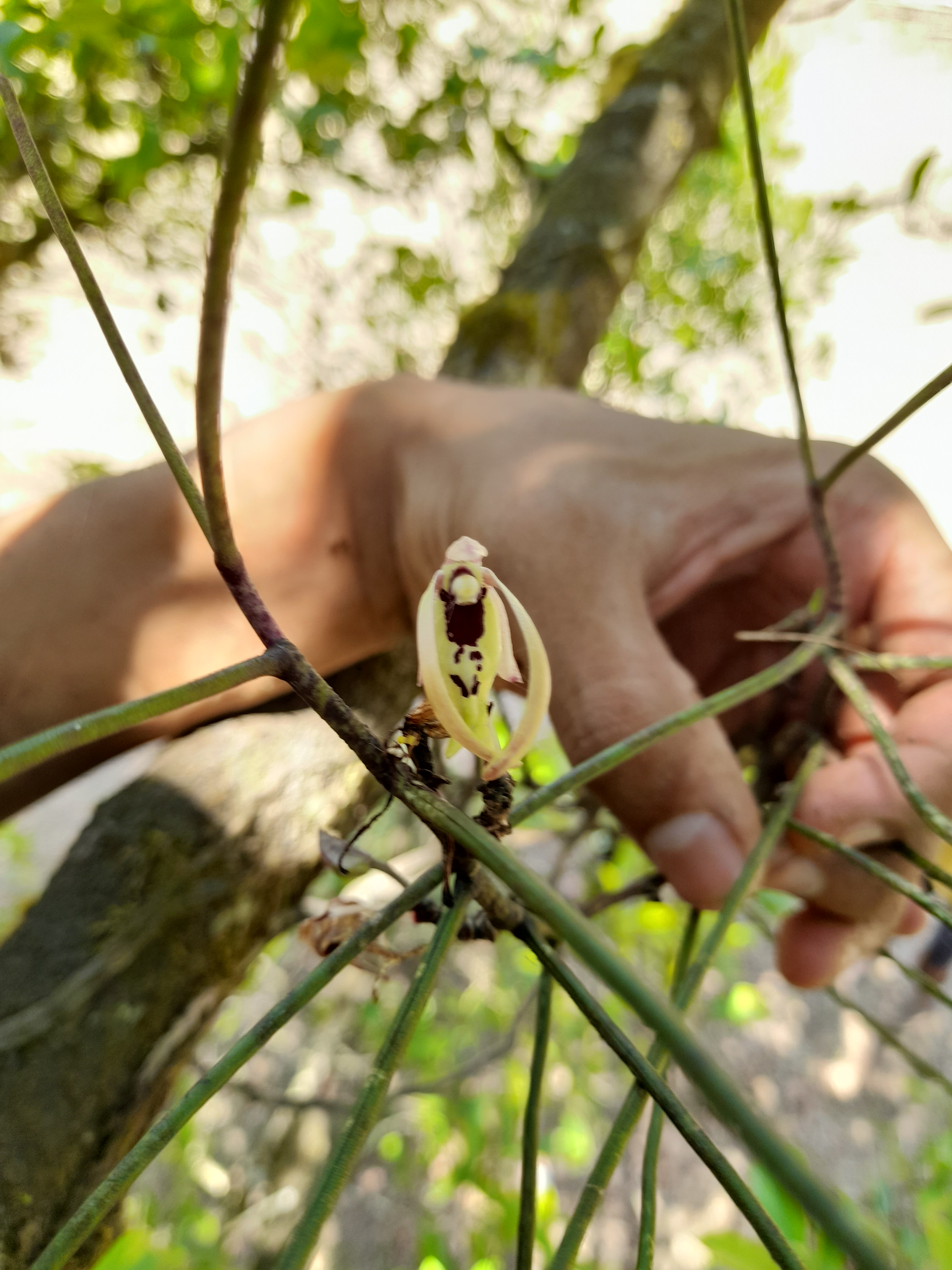

Scientific classification
- Kingdom: Plantae
- Clade: Tracheophytes
- Clade: Angiosperms
- Clade: Monocots
- Order: Asparagales
- Family: Orchidaceae
- Subfamily: Epidendroideae
- Genus: Luisia
- Species: L. tenuifolia

Binomial name
- Luisia tenuifolia Blume (1849)

Synonyms
- List: Cymbidium tenuifolium (Lindl.) Roxb.; Luisia evangelinae Willd.

= Luisia tenuifolia =

Species of orchid

Luisia tenuifolia, the slender-leaved luisia, is a species of epiphytic orchid, belonging to the Vanda alliance. It is native to Sri Lanka and southwestern India.

Its stem and leaves are slender and cylindrical, range between 8 and 17 centimeters .Flowers are medium large, with petals narrow, twice as long as the ovate concave sepals. Lip is narrowly fiddle-shaped, convex, with base broad, 2-sepals. Sepals are 1.2-1.6 cm long, yellowish-green with red maroon microscopic dots. Petals are more green. Sepals are 1.2-1.6 cm long, yellowish-green with red maroon microscopic dots. Petals are more green. Lip is white or greenish with maroon to deep purple base and lobes. Lip is white or greenish with maroon to deep purple base and lobes and it has two divergent lobes.
