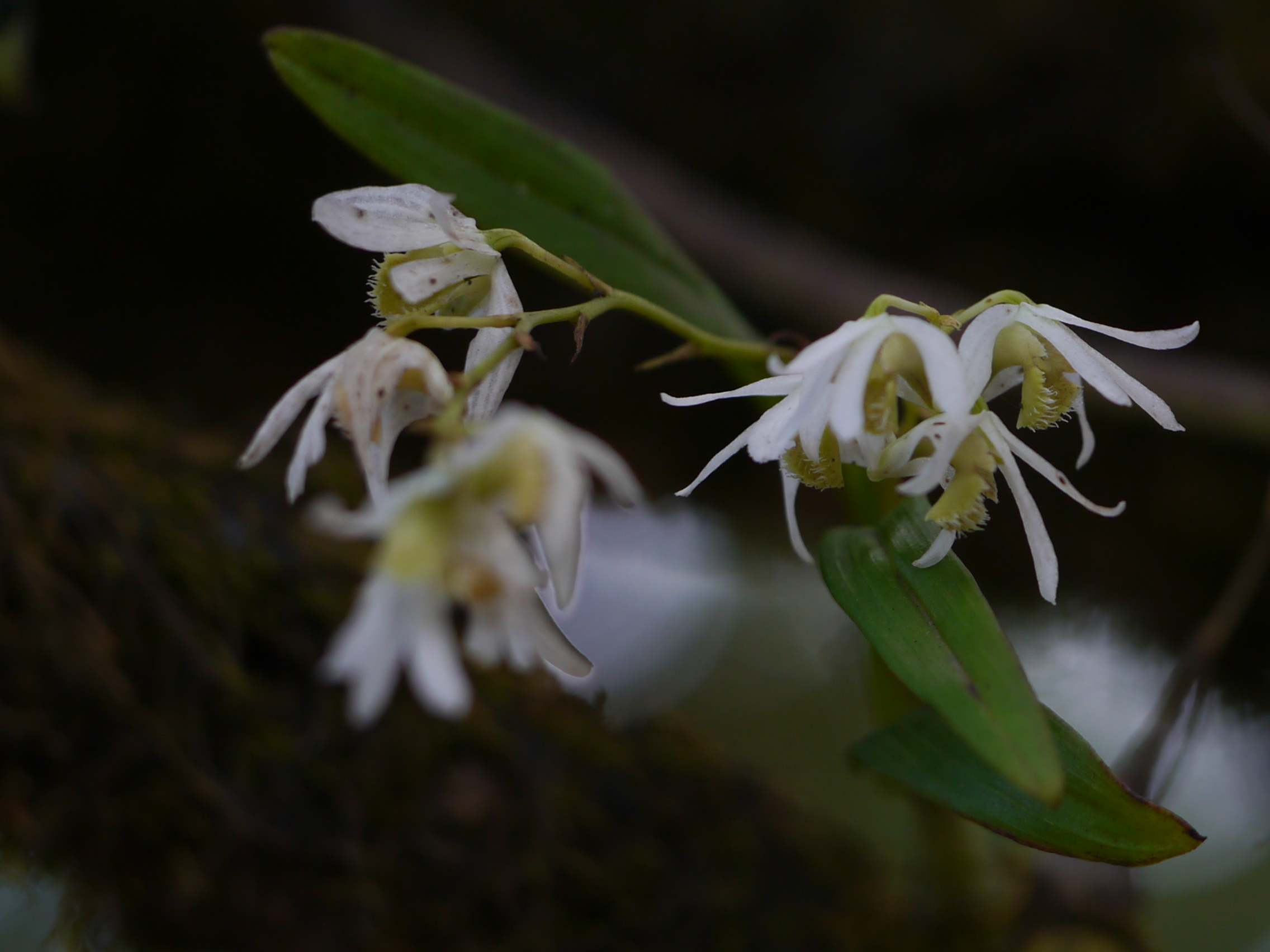

Scientific classification
- Kingdom: Plantae
- Clade: Tracheophytes
- Clade: Angiosperms
- Clade: Monocots
- Order: Asparagales
- Family: Orchidaceae
- Subfamily: Epidendroideae
- Genus: Dendrobium
- Species: D. nanum

Binomial name
- Dendrobium nanum Hook.f.

= Dendrobium nanum =

Species of orchid

Dendrobium nanum is a species of orchid in the genus Dendrobium Tiny Dendrobium is a small herb with pseudobulbs ovoid, covered with basal portion of leaves and smallest dendrobium known. Leaves are 3 or 4, 3 x 1.2 cm, lance-shaped-elliptic. Tiny flowers are borne in racemes up to 8 cm. Flowers are 6-8, pinkish white; bracts 0.5 cm, lance-shaped; sepals up to 8 mm; mentum to 5 mm; lip tri-lobed, narrowed to a short stalk; lateral lobes narrow, shortly pectinate; ovary with flower-stalks up to 1 cm. Tiny Dendrobium is endemic to Southern Western Ghats.
