= Odisha cleistantha =

Scientific classification
- Kingdom: Plantae
- Clade: Tracheophytes
- Clade: Angiosperms
- Clade: Monocots
- Order: Asparagales
- Family: Orchidaceae
- Subfamily: Orchidoideae
- Tribe: Orchideae
- Subtribe: Orchidinae
- Genus: Odisha; S.Misra
- Species: O. cleistantha

Binomial name
- Odisha cleistantha S.Misra

Species of orchid

Odisha is a genus of flowering plants in the orchid family Orchidaceae. It contains only one known species, Odisha cleistantha. While it is endemic to the state of Odisha (Orissa) , it is also found in Manipur, Jharkhand and Andhra Pradesh states of India. It is also detected as a threatened orchid of the Chota Nagpur Plateau.

== See also ==
- List of Orchidaceae genera
