= Someshwara Wildlife Sanctuary =

Protected area in Karnataka, India

- IUCN category IV (habitat/species management area)
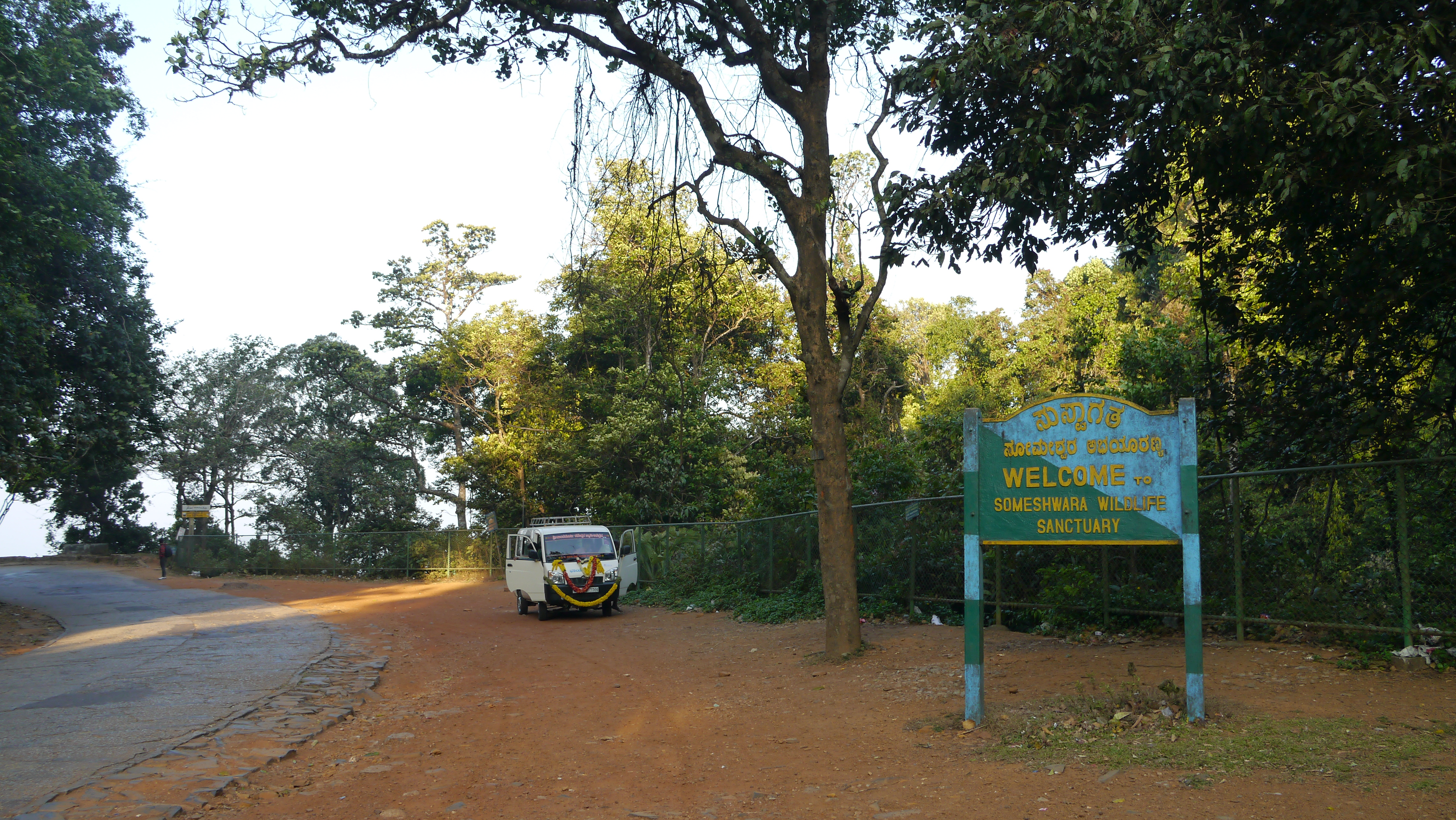

- Location within Karnataka Location within India
- Interactive map of Someshwara Wildlife Sanctuary
- Location: Udupi and Shivamogga districts, Karnataka, India
- Nearest city: Hebri, Udupi district
- Coordinates: 13°29′N 74°50′E
- Area: 314.25 km^{2} (121.33 sq mi)
- Established: 1974

Someshwara Wildlife Sanctuary is a protected wildlife sanctuary in the Western Ghats of Karnataka state in India. It is named after the presiding deity "Lord Someshwara" of the famed Someshwara temple located within the sanctuary. The sanctuary lies in Udupi and Shivamogga districts of Karnataka, below Agumbe. The sanctuary houses Sitanadi nature camp run by Karnataka Forest Department. Udupi to Agumbe road passes through this wildlife sanctuary. The nearest town is Hebri which is connected by bus service to Udupi, Mangaluru and Bengaluru on a daily basis.

The sanctuary was established in 1974 with an area of 88.40 km^{2} (34.13 sq mi).

It was subsequently expanded to 314.25 km^{2} (121.33 sq mi) in the year 2011 vide gazette notification "No: FEE302 FWL2011-(V), Bangalore, dated:27-12-2011". Post expansion the sanctuary spans across Udupi, Kundapura, Karkala, Thirthahalli taluks of Udupi and Shivamogga districts. The sanctuary was expanded by adding Balehalli Reserve Forest, Agumbe State Forest, Someshwara Reserved Forest and Tombatlu Reserved Forest areas, to the existing sanctuary. The expanded sanctuary forms a contiguous stretch of protected area that includes Mookambika Wildlife Sanctuary, Sharavathi Wildlife Sanctuary and Kudremukh National Park.

The perennial Sita River flows through the sanctuary.

== Flora and fauna ==
The Someshwara Wildlife Sanctuary has tropical wet evergreen forests, west coast semi evergreen forests and southern secondary moist mixed deciduous forests in its ranges.

The sanctuary has fauna like Bengal tiger, Indian leopard, Ussuri dhole, indian elephant, Indian jackal, Asian palm civet, jungle cat, Indian boar, Indian crested porcupine, sambar, spotted deer, Indian muntjac (barking deer), Indian spotted chevrotain, gaur (Indian bison), Black-naped hare, lion-tailed macaque, bonnet macaque, southern plains grey langur, Indian giant flying squirrel, king cobra, etc.

Great Indian hornbill, Malabar grey hornbill, Malabar trogon, Ceylon frogmouth, Malabar pied hornbill and Malabar whistling thrush are some of the birds found in the sanctuary. Otters and mahsheer fish are found in the Sitanadi river.

== Agumbe Rainforest Research Station ==
This research facility was founded by Mr. Romulus Whitaker, a herpetologist in 2005. This facility is located near Agumbe and conducts telemetry based projects on king cobra.

== Weather ==
Agumbe receives some of the heaviest rainfall in South India, comparable to Cherrapunji in North East India. The reserve forests of Someshwara Wildlife Sanctuary receive an average annual rainfall of about 7,000 mm (280 in).

== Other tourist attractions ==
Some of the other tourist attractions nearby are Agumbe Sunset Point, Barkana Falls, Onake Abbi Falls, Jogigundi Falls.
