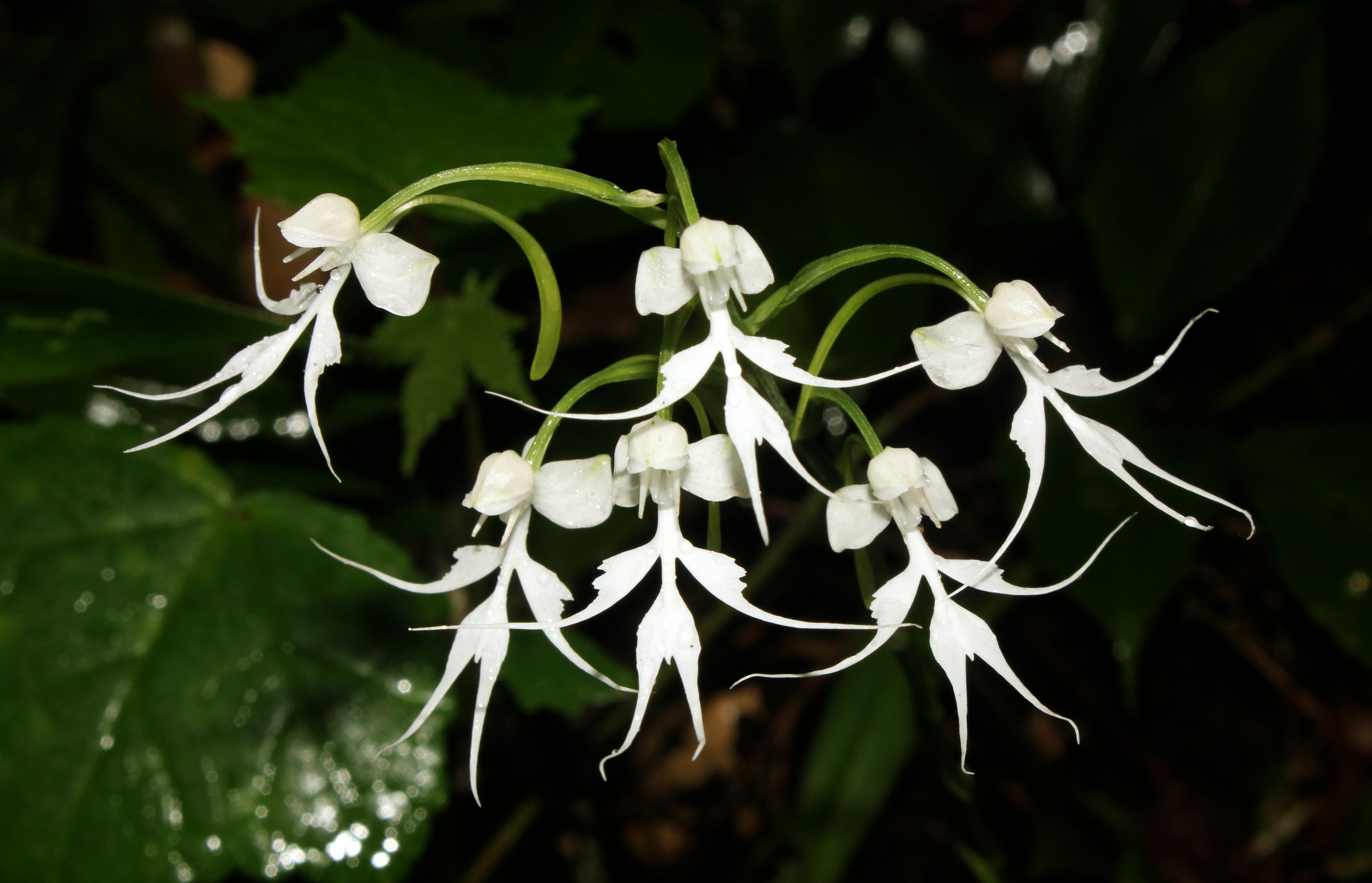

Scientific classification
- Kingdom: Plantae
- Clade: Tracheophytes
- Clade: Angiosperms
- Clade: Monocots
- Order: Asparagales
- Family: Orchidaceae
- Subfamily: Orchidoideae
- Genus: Habenaria
- Species: H. crinifera

Binomial name
- Habenaria crinifera Lindl.

= Habenaria crinifera =

Species of orchid

Habenaria crinifera is a species of orchid found in Asia. It is known as Narilatha in Sinhala and Doll Orchid in English. These orchids, which bloom in whole groups in late rains, are tuberous orchids with both epiphytic and terrestrial habitats. Flowers are white with smooth edged petals. The lip white, 3 times as long as sepals, with a long claw, 3-lobed with side lobes somewhat wedge shaped, having the outer margins toothed and with a slender tail as long as itself produced from the inner margin. The midlobe is clawed, cleft into 2 lance shaped long tailed segments as long as side lobes. Spur is slender and incurved.
