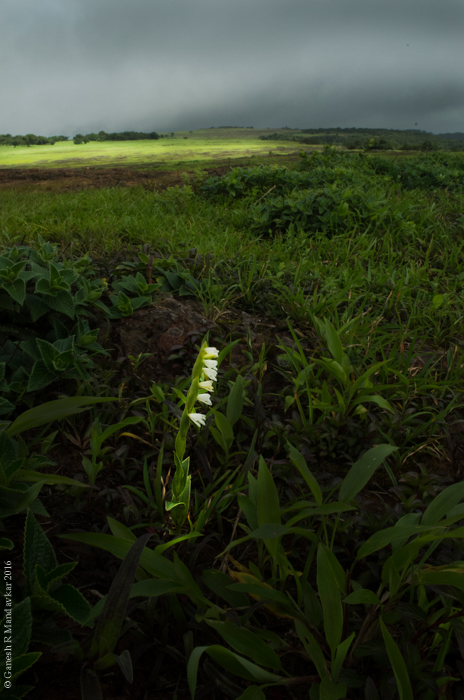

Conservation status
- CITES Appendix II

Scientific classification
- Kingdom: Plantae
- Clade: Embryophytes
- Clade: Tracheophytes
- Clade: Spermatophytes
- Clade: Angiosperms
- Clade: Monocots
- Order: Asparagales
- Family: Orchidaceae
- Subfamily: Orchidoideae
- Genus: Habenaria
- Species: H. heyneana

Binomial name
- Habenaria heyneana Lindl.

Synonyms
- Platanthera heyneana Lindl.; Habenaria glabra A.Rich.; Habenaria subpubens A.Rich.; Habenaria candida Dalzell; Habenaria heyneana var. subpubens (A.Rich.) Pradhan

= Habenaria heyneana =

Species of orchid

Habenaria heyneana is a species of orchid. This species of orchids found in high attitude areas such as the Western Ghats of India.
