= Dactylaria =

Scientific classification
- Domain: Eukaryota
- Kingdom: Fungi
- Division: Ascomycota
- Class: Leotiomycetes
- Order: Helotiales
- Genus: Dactylaria; Sacc.

Type species
- Dactylaria purpurella (Sacc.) Sacc.

Synonyms
- Didymotrichum F.von Höhnel, 1914; Diplorhinotrichum Höhn.

Genus of fungi

Dactylaria is a genus of fungi belonging to an unknown family. According to Wijayawardene et al. 2020; the genus was placed in order Helotiales genera incertae sedis.

The genus was first described by Pier Andrea Saccardo in 1880, and the type species is designated as Dactylaria purpurella.

The genus has a scattered, cosmopolitan distribution.

== Species ==
As accepted by Species Fungorum;

- Dactylaria acaciae Crous
- Dactylaria acanthacearum (Cooke) de Hoog & Arx
- Dactylaria acerina Matsush.
- Dactylaria acerosa Matsush. (1975)
- Dactylaria acicularis O. Rostr. (1916)
- Dactylaria affinis (O. Rostr.) G.C. Bhatt & W.B. Kendr. (1968)
- Dactylaria africana (S. Hughes) G.C. Bhatt & W.B. Kendr. (1968)
- Dactylaria appendiculata Cazau, Aramb. & Cabello (1990)
- Dactylaria arecae (Matsush.) R.F. Castañeda & W.B. Kendr. (1991)
- Dactylaria arundica Chowdhry (1982)
- Dactylaria aspirensis R.F. Castañeda & W.B. Kendr. (1991)
- Dactylaria asymmetrica Pasqual. (1999)
- Dactylaria attenuata Matsush. (1987)
- Dactylaria biguttulata Goh & K.D. Hyde (1999)
- Dactylaria biseptata Matsush. (1975)
- Dactylaria botulispora R.F. Castañeda & W.B. Kendr. (1990)
- Dactylaria brochopaga Drechsler (1937)
- Dactylaria candidula (Höhn.) G.C. Bhatt & W.B. Kendr. (1968)
- Dactylaria cazorlii Mercado, Gené & Guarro (2000)
- Dactylaria chrysosperma (Sacc.) G.C. Bhatt & W.B. Kendr. (1968)
- Dactylaria clavata Matsush. (1975)
- Dactylaria congregata de Hoog (1985)
- Dactylaria crinospora (G.F. Atk.) U. Braun & Crous (2003)
- Dactylaria cubensis R.F. Castañeda (1988)
- Dactylaria curviclavata Matsush. (1983)
- Dactylaria curvispora (Matsush.) de Hoog & Arx (1974)
- Dactylaria cvetkovicii Munt.-Cvetk. (1957)
- Dactylaria cylindrospora (Matsush.) R.F. Castañeda & W.B. Kendr. (1991)
- Dactylaria cymbiformis Matsush. (1980)
- Dactylaria dimorpha Matsush. (1975)
- Dactylaria dimorphospora Veenb.-Rijks (1973)
- Dactylaria dioscoreae M.B. Ellis (1976)
- Dactylaria domina-gregum Cif. (1955)
- Dactylaria endophytica W.P. Wu, B. Sutton & Gange (1996)
- Dactylaria eucalypti Vittal & Dorai (1991)
- Dactylaria fabiformis Matsush. (1993)
- Dactylaria fecundissima R.F. Castañeda & W.B. Kendr. (1991)
- Dactylaria ficicola B.C. Paulus, Gadek & K.D. Hyde (2003)
- Dactylaria filiformis R.F. Castañeda, Guarro & Cano (1996)
- Dactylaria flammulicornuta Pinnoi, E.B.G. Jones, McKenzie & K.D. Hyde (2003)
- Dactylaria fragilis de Hoog (1985)
- Dactylaria fulva R.Y. Roy & Gujarati (1965)
- Dactylaria fusarioidea Matsush. (1975)
- Dactylaria fusca (P.Rag. Rao & D. Rao) G.C. Bhatt & W.B. Kendr. (1968)
- Dactylaria fuscofusispora Matsush. (1971)
- Dactylaria fusifera (Berk. & M.A. Curtis) de Hoog (1985)
- Dactylaria fusiformis Shearer & J.L. Crane (1971)
- Dactylaria graminicola Årsvoll (1975)
- Dactylaria havanensis R.F. Castañeda (1988)
- Dactylaria hemibeltranioidea R.F. Castañeda & W.B. Kendr. (1991)
- Dactylaria hoogii R.F. Castañeda & W.B. Kendr. (1991)
- Dactylaria humicola G.C. Bhatt & W.B. Kendr. (1968)
- Dactylaria inaequilatera Matsush. (1983)
- Dactylaria indica G.P. Agarwal & Chowdhry (1977)
- Dactylaria intermedia Matsush. (1980)
- Dactylaria iriomoteana Matsush. (1987)
- Dactylaria irregularis de Hoog (1985)
- Dactylaria isoscelispora W.B. Kendr. & R.F. Castañeda (1990)
- Dactylaria isthmospora Cabello, Mengasc. & Aramb. (1987)
- Dactylaria kumamotoensis Matsush. (1981)
- Dactylaria lakebarrinensis Goh & K.D. Hyde (1998)
- Dactylaria lanosa Malla & W. Gams (1971)
- Dactylaria laxa R.F. Castañeda (1988)
- Dactylaria lepida Minter (1980)
- Dactylaria leptospermi J.A. Cooper (2005)
- Dactylaria leptosphaeriicola U. Braun & Crous (1992)
- Dactylaria lignicola W.B. Kendr. & R.F. Castañeda (1991)
- Dactylaria longidentata Cazau, Aramb. & Cabello (1990)
- Dactylaria longispora Matsush. (1987)
- Dactylaria lunata Tzean & J.L. Chen (1991)
- Dactylaria madrasensis Matsush. (1983)
- Dactylaria manifesta R.F. Castañeda & W.B. Kendr. (1991)
- Dactylaria mitrata Matsush. (1983)
- Dactylaria monticola R.F. Castañeda & W.B. Kendr. (1991)
- Dactylaria mucoglobifera Melnik, U. Braun & A.V. Alexandrova (2013)
- Dactylaria mycophila Tubaki (1955)
- Dactylaria naviculiformis Matsush. (1975)
- Dactylaria nectandrae R.F. Castañeda & W.B. Kendr. (1991)
- Dactylaria obclavata R.F. Castañeda, Guarro & Cano (1996)
- Dactylaria obovata (Matsush.) de Hoog & Arx (1974)
- Dactylaria obscuriseptata Goh & K.D. Hyde (1999)
- Dactylaria obtriangularia Matsush. (1975)
- Dactylaria olivacea (Jaap) G.C. Bhatt & W.B. Kendr. (1968)
- Dactylaria orchidis Cooke & Massee (1890)
- Dactylaria palmae Pinnoi, E.B.G. Jones, McKenzie & K.D. Hyde (2003)
- Dactylaria panici-repentis Sawada (1928)
- Dactylaria parvispora (Preuss) de Hoog & Arx (1974)
- Dactylaria plovercovensis Goh & K.D. Hyde (1999)
- Dactylaria ponapensis Matsush. (1985)
- Dactylaria pseudomanifesta J.L. Bezerra & D.M.A. Magalh. (2014)
- Dactylaria pulchra Linder (1934)
- Dactylaria purpurella (Sacc.) Sacc. (1880)
- Dactylaria pusilla (Deighton & Piroz.) de Hoog & Arx (1974)
- Dactylaria queenslandica Matsush. (1989)
- Dactylaria quercicola W.B. Kendr. & R.F. Castañeda (1991)
- Dactylaria reductiphora Matsush. (1995)
- Dactylaria rigidiphora (Matsush.) de Hoog (1977)
- Dactylaria saccardoana F.R. Barbosa & Gusmão (2013)
- Dactylaria sandinensis R.F. Castañeda & W.B. Kendr. (1991)
- Dactylaria scolecospora P.M. Kirk (1983)
- Dactylaria simonensis R.F. Castañeda & W.B. Kendr. (1991)
- Dactylaria sparsa R.F. Castañeda & W.B. Kendr. (1991)
- Dactylaria splendida R.F. Castañeda & W.B. Kendr. (1991)
- Dactylaria sporexamorpha Glockling (1992)
- Dactylaria triseptata (Matsush.) R.F. Castañeda & W.B. Kendr. (1991)
- Dactylaria tunicata Goh & K.D. Hyde (1997)
- Dactylaria uliginicola Pinnoi, E.B.G. Jones, McKenzie & K.D. Hyde (2003)
- Dactylaria xinjiangensis Z. Jiao, Xing Z. Liu & Y.T. Wang (1994)
- Dactylaria zapatensis R.F. Castañeda (1988)
