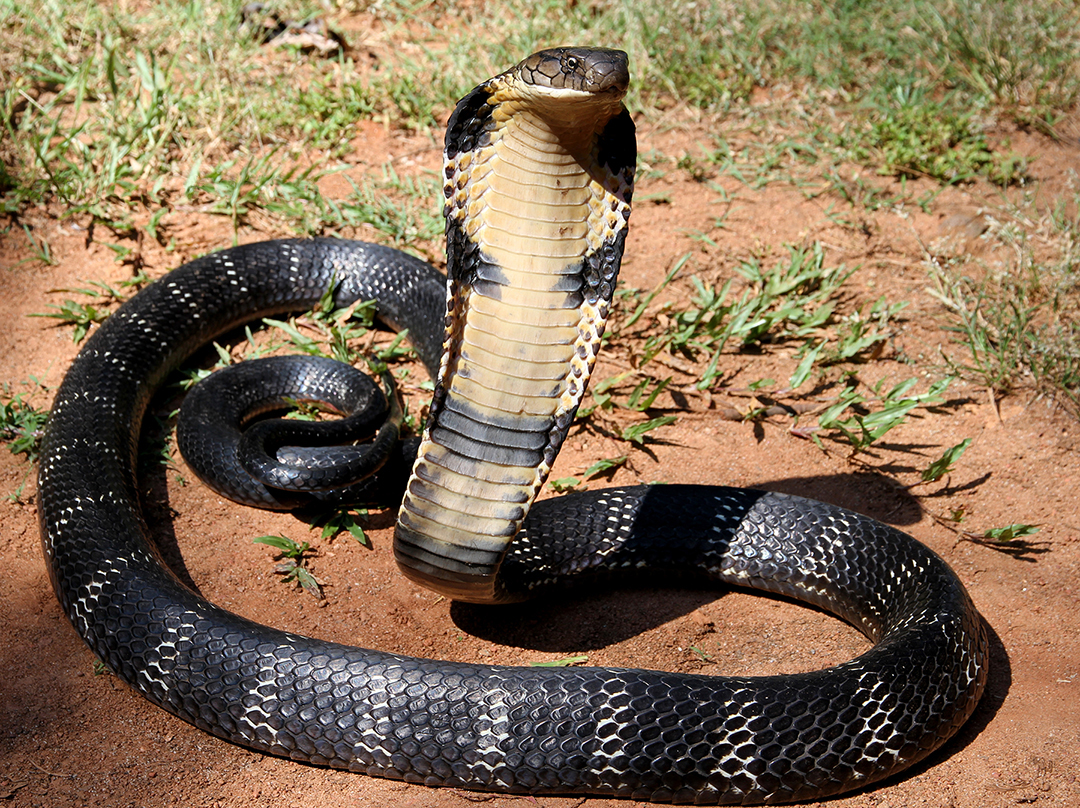

Conservation status
- Vulnerable (IUCN 3.1)
- CITES Appendix II

Scientific classification
- Kingdom: Animalia
- Phylum: Chordata
- Class: Reptilia
- Order: Squamata
- Suborder: Serpentes
- Family: Elapidae
- Genus: Ophiophagus; Günther, 1864
- Species: O. hannah

Binomial name
- Ophiophagus hannah (Cantor, 1836)
- Distribution of the Ophiophagus species- Ophiophagus hannah Ophiophagus kaalinga Ophiophagus bungarus Ophiophagus salvatana

Synonyms
- Genus-level: Hamadryas Cantor, 1836 (non Hübner, 1804: preoccupied); Hoplocephalus Wagler, 1830; Naja Schlegel, 1837

= King cobra =

Group of venomous snakes from Asia

The king cobra (Ophiophagus hannah) is a species complex of snakes endemic to Asia. With an average length of 3.18 to 4 m (10.4 to 13.1 ft) and a record length of 5.85 m (19.2 ft), it is the world's longest venomous snake and among the heaviest. Under the genus Ophiophagus, it is not phylogenetically a true cobra despite its common name and some resemblance. Spanning from the Indian subcontinent through Southeastern Asia to Southern China, the king cobra is widely distributed albeit not commonly seen.

Individuals have diversified colouration across its habitats, from black with white strips to unbroken brownish grey, although after taxonomic re-evaluation, it is no longer the sole member of its genus but is now a species complex; these differences in pattern and other aspects may cause the genus to be split into at least four species, spread across its large geographic range.

It chiefly hunts other snakes, including those of its own kind, although other lizards and rodents are also occasional prey. This is the only ophidian that constructs an above-ground nest for its eggs, which are purposefully and meticulously gathered and protected by the female throughout the incubation period. Typical threat display of this elapid includes neck-flap spreading, head raising, hissing and sometimes charging. Capable of striking at a considerable range and height with an immense venom yield, envenomation from this species may induce rapid onset of neurotoxic and cytotoxic symptoms, requiring prompt antivenom administration. Despite the fearsome reputation, aggression toward humans usually only arises from an individual inadvertently exposing itself or being cornered; encounters happen through chance, including negative interactions.

Threatened by habitat destruction, it has been listed as Vulnerable on the IUCN Red List since 2010. Regarded as the national reptile of India, it has an eminent position in the mythology and folk traditions of India, Bangladesh, Sri Lanka and Myanmar.

== Etymology ==
The king cobra is also referred to by the common name "hamadryad", especially in older literature. Hamadryas hannah was the scientific name used by Danish naturalist Theodore Edward Cantor in 1836 who described four king cobra specimens, three captured in the Sundarbans and one in the vicinity of Kolkata. The origin of the species name hannah was not specified during description and has long been uncertain, but may potentially refer to Hannah Sarah Wallich, the eldest daughter of Cantor's uncle, botanist Nathaniel Wallich, who hosted Cantor during his studies in India.

== Taxonomy ==
The genus Ophiophagus was proposed by Günther in 1864 in place of Hamadryas, as the genus Hamadryas was already used for the cracker butterflies. The name is derived from its propensity to eat snakes. Ophiophagus hannah was accepted as the valid name for the king cobra by Charles Mitchill Bogert in 1945 who argued that it differs significantly from Naja species.

It has been suggested that three more king cobra species exist in addition to O. hannah, namely the Sunda king cobra (O. bungarus), the Western Ghats king cobra (O. kaalinga), and the Luzon king cobra (O. salvatana). These distinct genetic lineages are geographically isolated and adapted to specific ecological regions.

=== Synonyms ===
In 1838, Cantor proposed the name Hamadryas ophiophagus for the king cobra and explained that it has dental features intermediate between the genera Naja and Bungarus. Naia vittata proposed by Walter Elliot in 1840 was a king cobra caught offshore near Chennai that was floating in a basket. This provenance is disputed, as wild king cobras have never occurred near Chennai, and an analysis of this specimen has found it to be more similar to the northern king cobra. Hamadryas elaps proposed by Albert Günther in 1858 were king cobra specimens from the Philippines and Borneo. Günther considered both N. bungarus and N. vittata a variety of H. elaps. Naja ingens proposed by Alexander Willem Michiel van Hasselt in 1882 was a king cobra captured near Tebing Tinggi in northern Sumatra.

The earliest scientific name for the king cobra was Naja bungaroides, given by Friedrich Boie in 1828 based on a juvenile specimen from Java. This description was improperly done, leaving it a nomen nudum at the time. However, Johann Georg Wagler validated the name in 1830 with a sufficient diagnosis, and also proposed a new genus for it, Hoplocephalus. In 1837, Hermann Schlegel used the name Naja bungaroides for his description of the Australian broad-headed snake, which was later reclassified into Wagler's Hoplocephalus, and used the species name Naja bungarus for the king cobra. Since then, the species name Naja/Hoplocephalus bungaroides, originally coined for the king cobra and improperly assigned to the broad-headed snake, became conflated with the broad-headed snake and used as the type species of Hoplocephalus, while the species name Naja bungarus was treated as a junior synonym of the king cobra (until its revival as the species name for the Sunda king cobra in 2024). This longstanding discrepancy, which breaks the principle of priority, was overlooked for nearly two centuries and only discovered in 2024. Due to the long presence of the names Ophiophagus hannah and Hoplocephalus bungaroides in the literature, which would be upended if these two species were reclassified based on this issue, it was decided to maintain the longstanding scientific names for both taxa and designate a new, accurate type specimen for the broad-headed snake.

=== Evolution ===
A genetic analysis using cytochrome b, and a multigene analysis showed that the king cobra was an early offshoot of a genetic lineage giving rise to the mambas, rather than the Naja cobras.

A phylogenetic analysis of mitochondrial DNA showed that specimens from Surat Thani Province and Nakhon Si Thammarat Provinces in southern Thailand form a deeply genetically divergent clade from those in northern Thailand, which grouped with specimens from Myanmar and Guangdong in southern China.

== Description ==
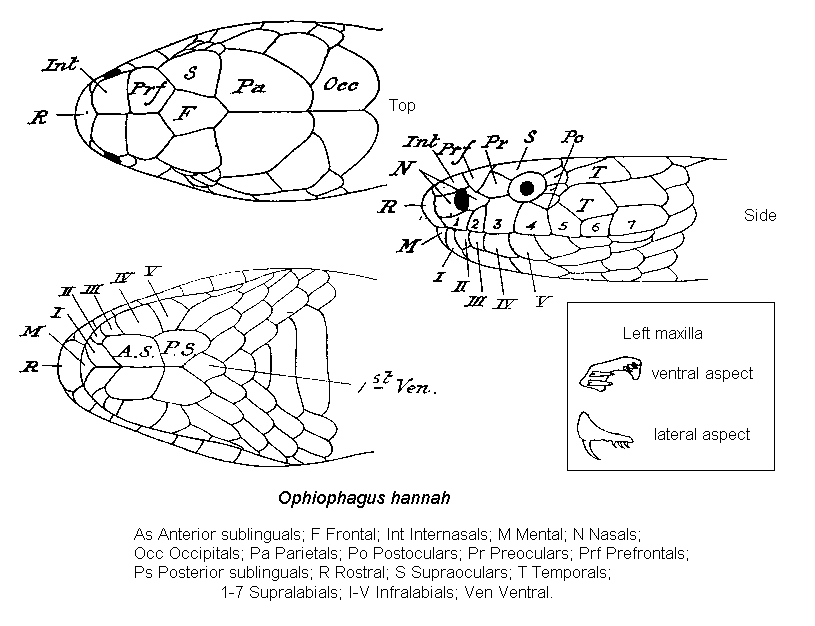
Scales of the king cobra

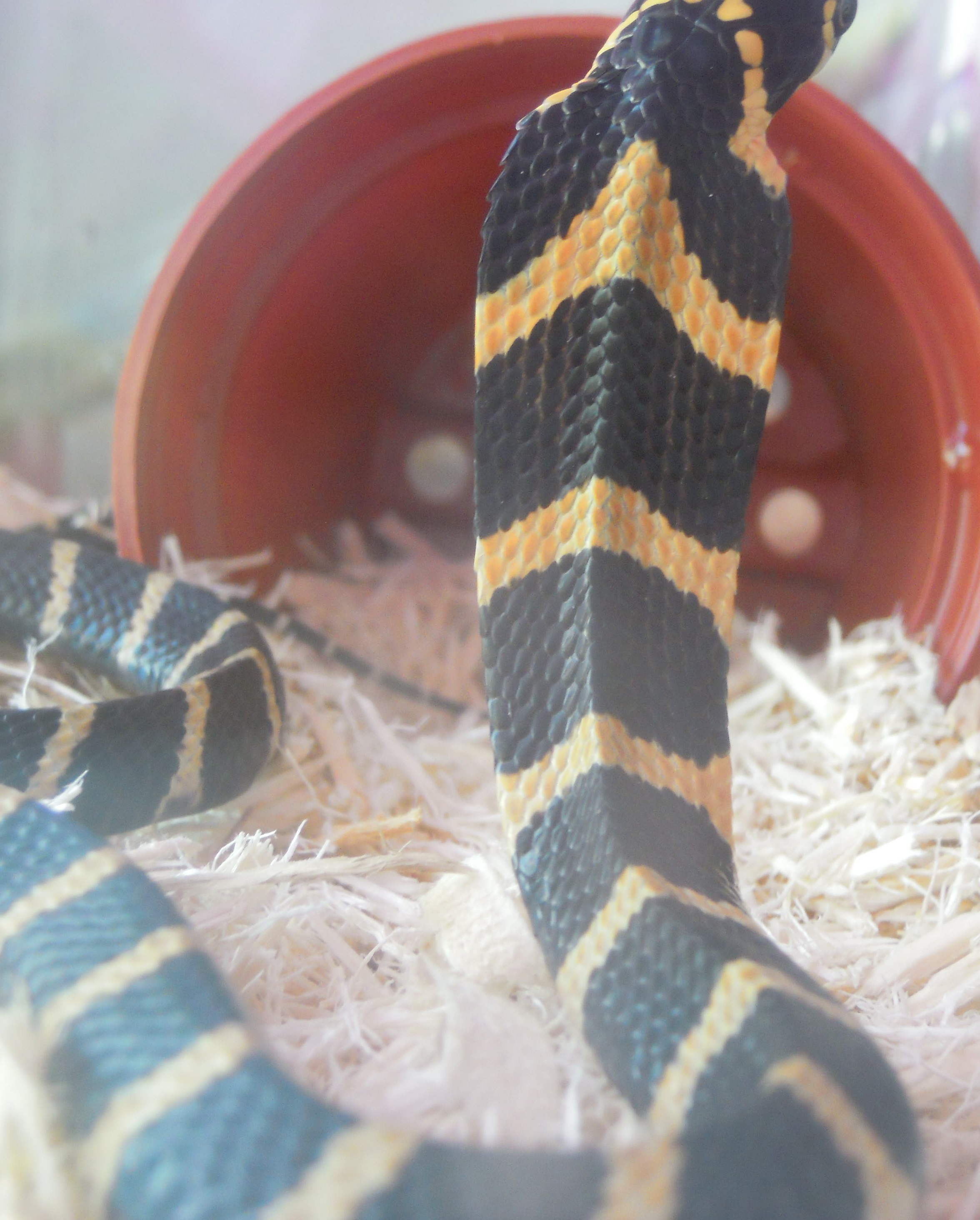
A baby king cobra showing its chevron pattern on the back

The king cobra's skin is olive green with black and white bands on the trunk that converge to the head. The head is covered by 15 drab-coloured and black-edged shields (large scales consistently present between individuals). The muzzle is rounded, and the tongue black. It has two fangs and 3–5 maxillary teeth in the upper jaw, and two rows of teeth in the lower jaw. The nostrils are between two shields. The large eyes have a golden iris and round pupils. Its hood is oval shaped and covered with olive green smooth scales and two black spots between the two lowest scales. Its cylindrical tail is yellowish green above and marked with black. It has a pair of large occipital scales on top of the head, 17 to 19 rows of smooth oblique scales on the neck, and 15 rows on the body. Juveniles are black with chevron shaped white, yellow or buff bars that point towards the head.

Adult king cobras are 3.18 to 4 m (10.4 to 13.1 ft) long. The longest known individual measured 5.85 m (19.2 ft). Ventral scales are uniformly oval shaped. Dorsal scales are placed in an oblique arrangement.

The king cobra is sexually dimorphic, with males being larger and paler in particular during the breeding season. Males captured in Kerala measured up to 3.75 m (12.3 ft) and weighed up to 10 kg (22 lb). Females captured had a maximum length of 2.75 m (9 ft 0 in) and a weight of 5 kg (11 lb). The largest known king cobra was 5.59 m (18 ft 4 in) long and captured in Thailand. It differs from other cobra species by size and hood. It is larger, has a narrower and longer stripe on the neck.

== Distribution and habitat ==
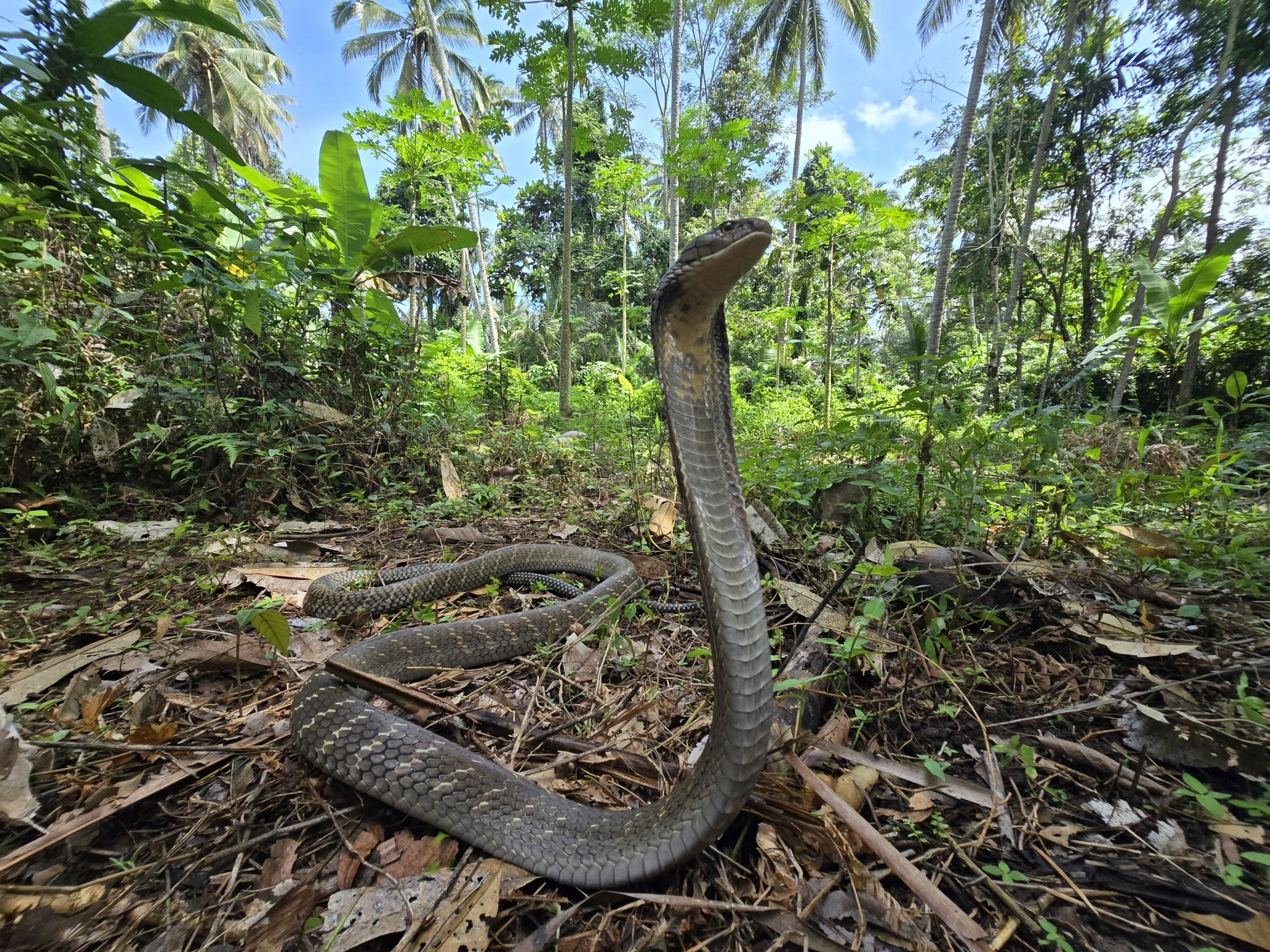
King cobra in its habitat

The king cobra has a wide distribution throughout tropical Asia. It occurs in elevations of 2,000 m (6,600 ft) from the Terai in India and southern Nepal to the Brahmaputra River basin in Bhutan and northeast India, down to Bangladesh, Myanmar, southern China, Cambodia, Thailand, Laos, Vietnam; to the maritime Southeast Asian countries of Malaysia, Singapore, Indonesia and the Philippines.

In northern India, it has been recorded in Garhwal and Kumaon, and in the Sivalik Hills and terai regions of Uttarakhand and Uttar Pradesh. In northeast India, the king cobra has been recorded in northern West Bengal, Sikkim, Assam, Meghalaya, Arunachal Pradesh, Nagaland, Manipur and Mizoram. In the Eastern Ghats, it occurs from Tamil Nadu and Andhra Pradesh to coastal Odisha, and also in Bihar and southern West Bengal, especially the Sundarbans. In the Western Ghats, it was recorded in Kerala, Karnataka and Maharashtra, and also in Gujarat. It also occurs on Baratang Island in the Great Andaman chain. It may have reached the furthest west of its distributional range in extreme western India and eastern Pakistan, in the vicinity of Lahore and Palanpur. These populations have sometimes been thought to be the result of introduction by snake charmers or transport along rivers, but are now more likely considered natural populations. However, it remains uncertain if any populations continue to persist there.

== Behaviour and ecology ==
Like other snakes, a king cobra receives chemical information via its forked tongue, which picks up scent particles and transfers them to a sensory receptor (Jacobson's organ) located in the roof of its mouth. Following envenomation, it swallows its prey whole. Because of its flexible jaws, it can swallow prey much larger than its head. It is considered diurnal because it hunts during the day, but has also been seen at night, albeit rarely.

=== Diet ===
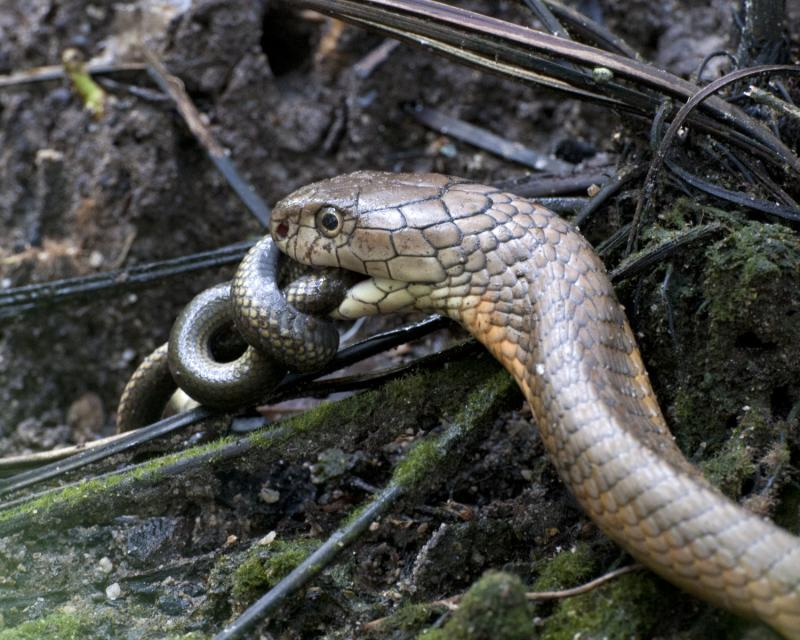
Preying on a smaller snake

The king cobra is an apex predator and dominant over all other snakes except large pythons. Its diet consists primarily of other snakes and lizards, including varanids, Indian cobra, banded krait, Oriental rat snake, reticulated pythons, green whip snake, Himalayan keelback, banded wolf snake and Blyth's reticulated snake. It also hunts Malabar pit viper and hump-nosed pit viper by following their odour trails. In Singapore, one was observed swallowing a clouded monitor. When food is scarce, it also feeds on other small vertebrates, such as birds, and lizards. In some cases, the cobra constricts its prey using its muscular body, though this is uncommon. After a large meal, it may go for many months without another one because of its slow metabolic rate.

=== Antipredator behavior ===
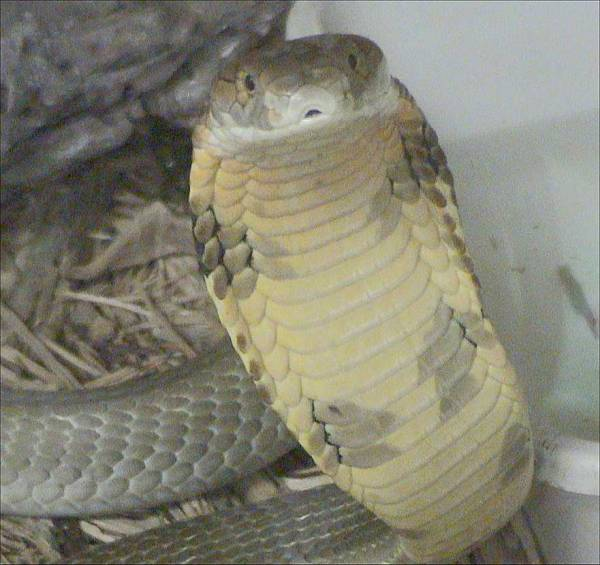
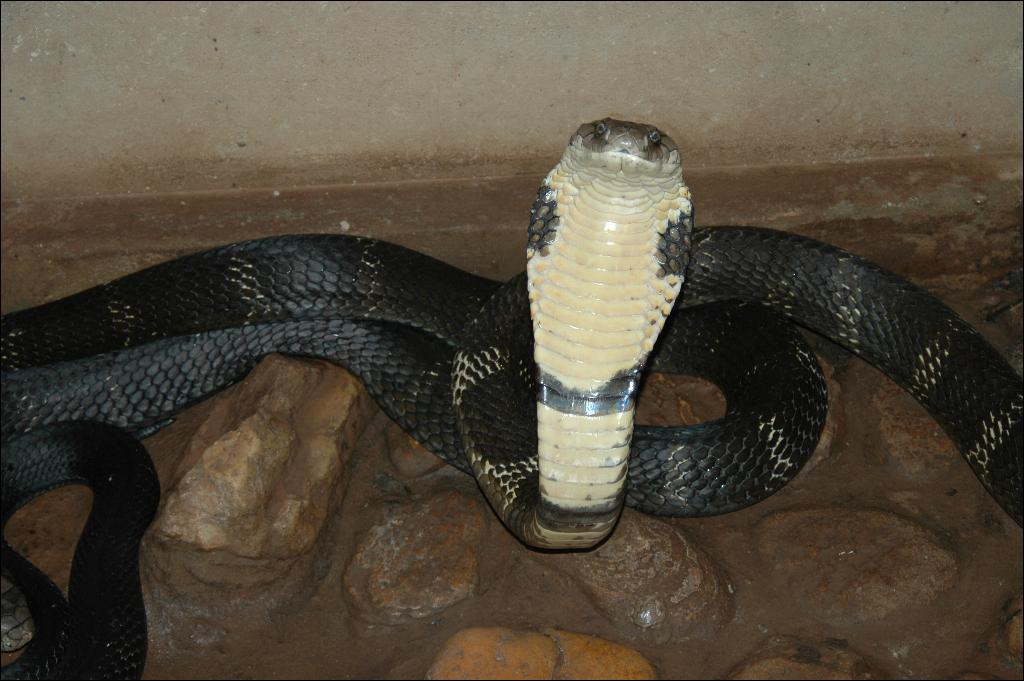
Captive king cobras with their hoods extended

The king cobra is not considered aggressive. It usually avoids humans and slinks off when disturbed, but is known to aggressively defend incubating eggs and attack intruders rapidly. When alarmed, it raises the front part of its body, extends the hood, shows the fangs and hisses loudly. Wild king cobras encountered in Singapore appeared to be placid, but reared up and struck in self defense when cornered.

The king cobra can be easily irritated by closely approaching objects or sudden movements. When raising its body, the king cobra can still move forward to strike with a long distance, and people may misjudge the safe zone. It can deliver multiple bites in a single attack.

The hiss of the king cobra is a much lower pitch than many other snakes and many people thus liken its call to a "growl" rather than a hiss. While the hisses of most snakes are of a broad-frequency span ranging from roughly 3,000 to 13,000 Hz with a dominant frequency near 7,500 Hz, king cobra growls consist solely of frequencies below 2,500 Hz, with a dominant frequency near 600 Hz, a much lower-pitched frequency closer to that of a human voice. Comparative anatomical morphometric analysis has led to a discovery of tracheal diverticula that function as low-frequency resonating chambers in king cobra and its prey, the rat snake, both of which can make similar growls.

=== Reproduction ===
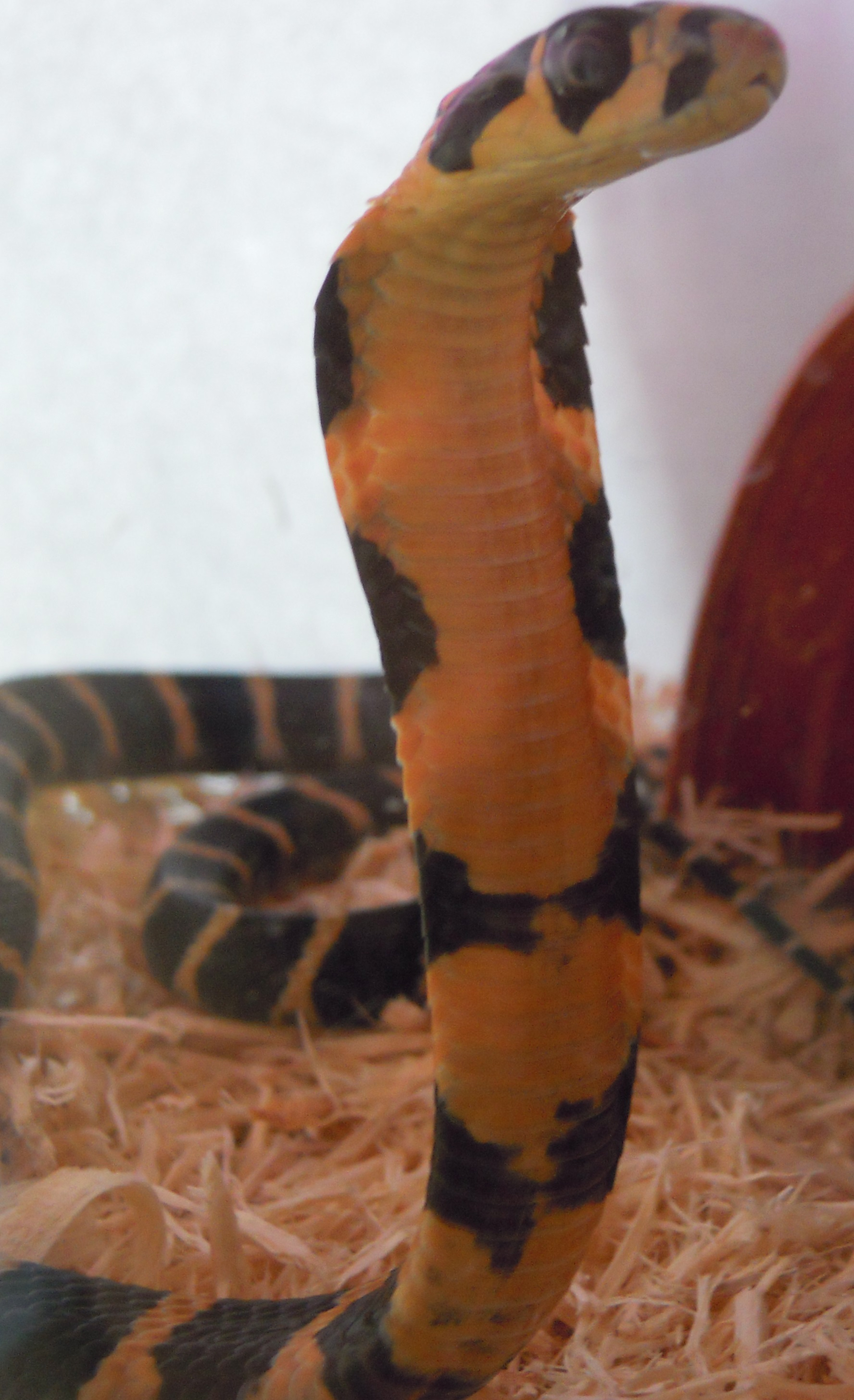
A captive juvenile king cobra in its defensive posture

The female is gravid for 50 to 59 days. The king cobra is the only snake that builds a nest using dry leaf litter, starting from late March to late May. Most nests are located at the base of trees, are up to 55 cm (22 in) high in the centre and 140 cm (55 in) wide at the base. They consist of several layers and have mostly one chamber, into which the female lays eggs. Clutch size ranges from 7 to 43 eggs, with 6 to 38 eggs hatching after incubation periods of 66 to 105 days. Temperature inside nests is not steady but varies depending on elevation from 13.5 to 37.4 °C (56.3 to 99.3 °F). Females stay by their nests between two and 77 days. Hatchlings are between 37.5 and 58.5 cm (14.8 and 23.0 in) long and weigh 9 to 38 g (0.32 to 1.34 oz).

The king cobra was shown to be capable of facultative parthenogenesis. The parthenogenetic mechanism appears to be a variation of meiosis referred to as terminal fusion automixis in which there is fusion of the meiotic products formed at the anaphase II stage of meiosis.

The venom of hatchlings is as potent as that of the adults. They may be brightly marked, but these colours often fade as they mature. They are alert and nervous, being highly aggressive if disturbed.

The average lifespan of a wild king cobra is about 20 years.

== Venom ==
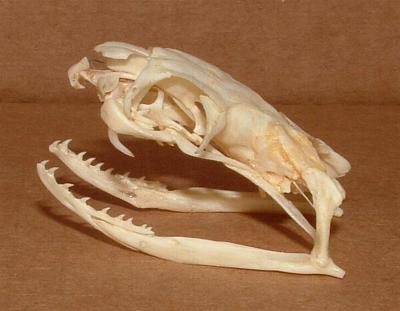
Lateral view of a king cobra skull with fangs

=== Composition ===
Venom of the king cobra, produced by the postorbital venom glands, consists primarily of three-finger toxins (3FTx) and snake venom metalloproteinases (SVMPs).

Of all the 3FTx, alpha-neurotoxins are the predominant and most lethal components when cytotoxins and beta-cardiotoxins also exhibit toxicological activities. It is reported that cytotoxicity of its venom varies significantly, depending upon the age and locality of an individual. Clinical cardiotoxicity is not widely observed, nor is nephrotoxicity present among patients bitten by this species, presumably due to the low abundance of the toxins.

SVMPs are the second-most protein family isolated from the king cobra's venom, accounting from 11.9% to 24.4% of total venom proteins. The abundance is much higher than that of most cobras, which is usually less than 1%. This protein family includes principal toxins responsible for vasculature damage and interference with haemostasis, contributing to bleeding and coagulopathy caused by envenomation of vipers. While there are such haemorrhagins isolated from the king cobra's venom, they only induce species-sensitive haemorrhagic and lethal activities on rabbits and hares, but with minimal effects on mice. Clinical pathophysiology of the king cobra's SVMPs has yet to be well studied, although its substantial quantity suggests involvement in tissue damage and necrosis as a result of inflammatory and proteolytic activities, which are instrumental for foraging and digestive purposes.

Ohanin, a minor vespryn protein component specific to this species, causes hypolocomotion and hyperalgesia in experimental mice. It is believed that it contributes to neurotoxicity on the central nervous system of the victim.

=== Clinical management ===
A king cobra's bite, and subsequent envenomation, is an immediate medical emergency in humans or domesticated animals, as, if not treated as soon as possible, death can occur in as little as 30 minutes. Local symptoms include dusky discolouration of skin, edema and pain; in severe cases, swelling extends proximally, with necrosis and tissue sloughing that may require amputation. Onset of general symptoms follows while the venom is targeting the victim's central nervous system, resulting in blurred vision, vertigo, drowsiness, and eventual paralysis. If not treated promptly, it may progress to cardiovascular collapse and, subsequently, coma. Death soon follows due to respiratory failure, among other simultaneous and varied system and organ failures.

Polyvalent antivenom of equine origin is produced by Haffkine Institute and King Institute of Preventive Medicine and Research in India. A polyvalent antivenom produced by the Thai Red Cross Society can effectively neutralise venom of the king cobra. Proper and immediate treatments are critical to avoid death. Successful precedents include a client who recovered and was discharged in 10 days after being treated by accurate antivenom and inpatient care.

It can deliver up to 420 mg venom in dry weight (400–600 mg overall) per bite, with a LD_{50} toxicity in mice of 1.28 mg/kg through intravenous injection, 1.5 to 1.7 mg/kg through subcutaneous injection, and 1.644 mg/kg through intraperitoneal injection. For research purposes, up to 1 g of venom was obtained through milking.

In India and Thailand, a concoction (or liquid blend) of turmeric (Curcuma longa) and other herbs may be used in folk medicine against king cobra bites, but there is currently no clinical evidence that this is effective in the treatment or prevention of envenomation.

== Relationship with humans ==
=== Conservation ===
In Southeast Asia, the king cobra is threatened foremost by habitat destruction owing to deforestation and expansion of agricultural land. It is also threatened by wildlife smuggling, as well as by poaching, then sold as bushmeat or turned into snake leather, and for use in traditional Chinese medicine.

The king cobra is listed in CITES Appendix II. It is protected in China and Vietnam. In India, it is placed under Schedule II of Wildlife Protection Act, 1972. Killing a king cobra is punished with imprisonment of up to six years. In the Philippines, king cobras (locally known as banakon) are included under the list of threatened species in the country. It is protected under the Wildlife Resources Conservation and Protection Act (Republic Act No. 9147), which criminalises the killing, trade, and consumption of threatened species with certain exceptions (like indigenous subsistence hunting or immediate threats to human life), with a maximum penalty of two years imprisonment and a fine of ₱20,000.

=== Cultural significance ===
The king cobra has an eminent position in the mythology and folklore of India, Bangladesh, Sri Lanka and Myanmar. A ritual in Myanmar involves a king cobra and a female snake charmer. The charmer is a priestess who is usually tattooed with three pictograms and kisses the snake on the top of its head at the end of the ritual. Members of the Pakokku clan tattoo themselves with ink mixed with cobra venom on their upper bodies in a weekly inoculation that they believe would protect them from the snake, though no scientific evidence supports this. It is regarded as the national reptile of India. In India, the king cobra is believed to possess exceptional memory; according to a myth, the killer of a king cobra stays in the eyes of the snake as an image, which is later picked up by the snake's partner and used to hunt down the killer for revenge. Because of this myth, whenever a cobra is killed, especially in India, the head, if not the entire body, is either crushed or burned to destroy the eyes completely. In Bangkok's Bang Khun Thian district is a shrine to the king cobra by Rama II Road that was built after the nest and young of a large female king cobra were destroyed during the construction of the road. The original shrine is dedicated to a female spirit associated with the cobra. Nearby stands another shrine dedicated to a male spirit, believed to be the mate of the female king cobra; according to local belief, he later came there to meditate and perform ascetic practices in dedication to the female cobra and her offspring after their deaths. The overgrown area behind and beneath the shrines is still believed to be home to several large king cobras, and both shrines are associated with the belief that the snakes continue to inhabit the area.

== See also ==
- List of largest snakes
