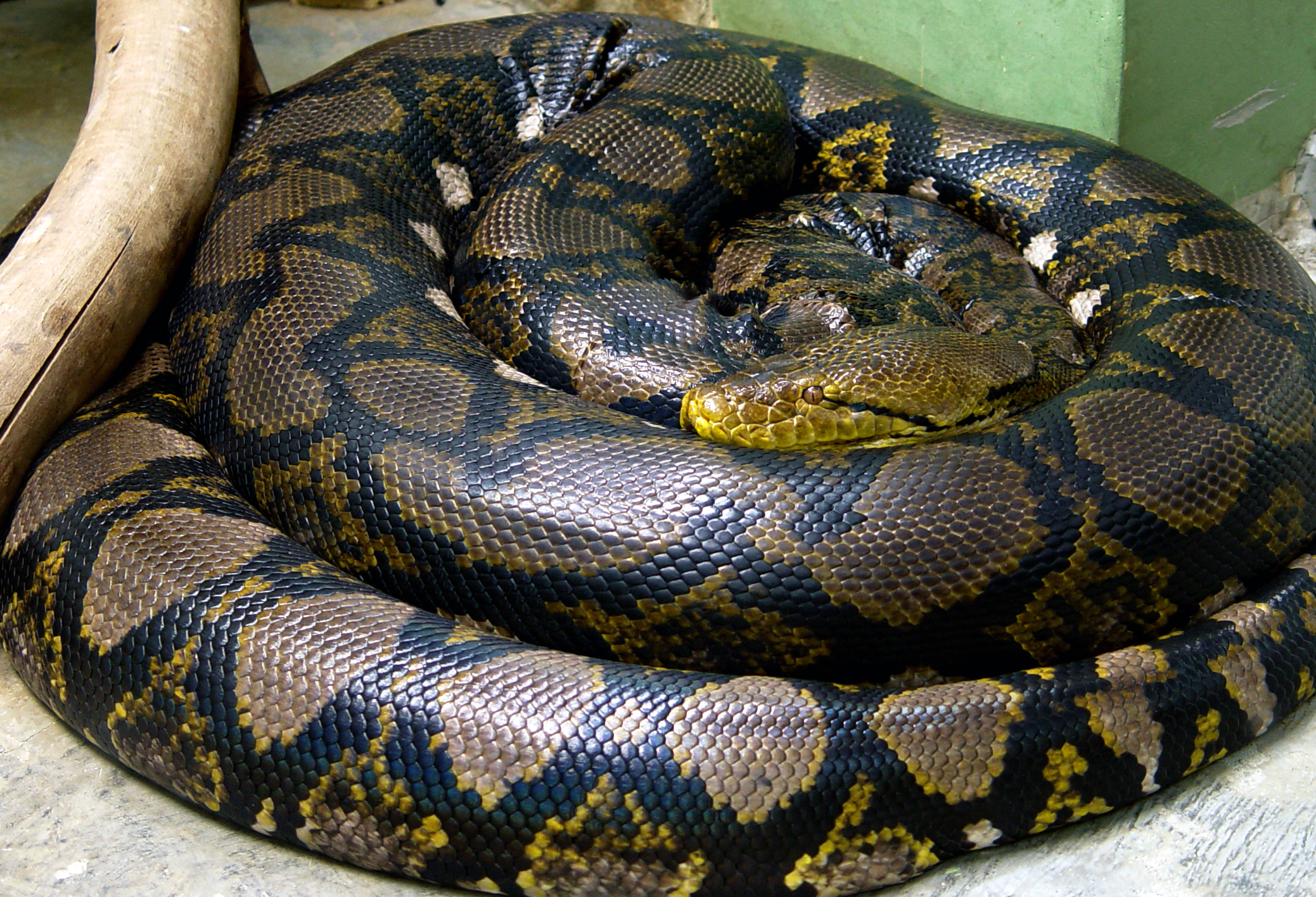
- Reticulated python (Malayopython reticulatus)

Scientific classification
- Kingdom: Animalia
- Phylum: Chordata
- Class: Reptilia
- Order: Squamata
- Suborder: Serpentes
- Family: Pythonidae
- Genus: Malayopython; Reynolds et al., 2014

Type species
- Boa reticulata Schneider, 1801

= Malayopython =

Malayopython Temporal range: Pleistocene to recent

Genus of snakes

Malayopython is a genus of constricting snakes in the family Pythonidae. The genus is native to India and Southeast Asia. It contains two species, both of which were previously classified within the genus Python. However, multiple studies recovered these species as distinct. Known as the "reticulatus clade", it was eventually found to be sister to a lineage giving rise to the Indo-Australian pythons rather than the genus Python.

== Taxonomy ==
In 1975, American herpetologist Samuel Booker McDowell divided the genus Python into a "molurus group" and "reticulatus group" on the basis of differences in supralabial pits (shallow diagonal slits in the latter, square or triangular in the former) and infralabial pits (shallow and not in a groove in the former, in a groove in the latter), as well as differences in the ectopterygoid and hemipenis. He added New Guinea members of Liasis and Morelia to the reticulatus group. American zoologist Arnold G. Kluge performed a cladistics analysis on morphological characters and recovered a reticulatus lineage as a sister to the genus Python; hence not requiring a new generic name in 1993. In a 2004 genetics study using cytochrome b DNA, Robin Lawson and colleagues recovered the reticulated python as a sister to the Australo-Papuan pythons, rather than Python molurus and its relatives.

The Australian author and snake exhibitor Raymond Hoser erected the genus Broghammerus for the reticulated python in 2004, naming it after the German snake breeder Stefan Broghammer, on the basis of dorsal patterns distinct from those of the genus Python, and a dark mid-dorsal line from the rear to the front of the head, and red or orange (rather than brown) iris colour. In 2008, Lesley Rawlings and colleagues reanalysed Kluge's morphological data and combined them with genetic material, and found the reticulated clade to be an offshoot of the Australo-Papuan lineage as well. They adopted and redefined the genus name Broghammerus. R. Graham Reynolds and colleagues in 2014 also confirmed the clade's place as a sister to the Australo-Papuan pythons, but coined the name Malayopython rather than recognizing Broghammerus, stating that they considered Broghammerus to be "invalid" due to it originating from "non-peer reviewed writing that included no formal data or analyses". They cited a 2013 publication by H. Kaiser and colleagues who had taken the position that Broghammerus and various other names proposed by Hoser (and one other author of Australian publications) "should not be used in herpetological nomenclature, pending suitable action by the ICZN" (the International Commission on Zoological Nomenclature). ICZN Commissioner Frank Krell later wrote in 2021 that Kaiser's publication was a "well-supported proposal" and that the voluntary decision by herpetologists to ignore and overwrite Hoser's names seemed the appropriate "way forward". Malayopython has thus become the generally accepted name in the herpetological community by institutions such as IUCN, ITIS, and The Reptile Database. ITIS identifies Broghammerus as an invalid nomen nudum.

=== Species ===
Species	Image	IUCN Red List and geographic range
Reticulated python, M. reticulatus (Schneider, 1801)		LC Mainland Southeast Asia and the Malay Archipelago
Timor python, M. timoriensis (W. Peters, 1876)		VU Indonesia on the Lesser Sunda Islands of Flores, Lomblen and Timor
