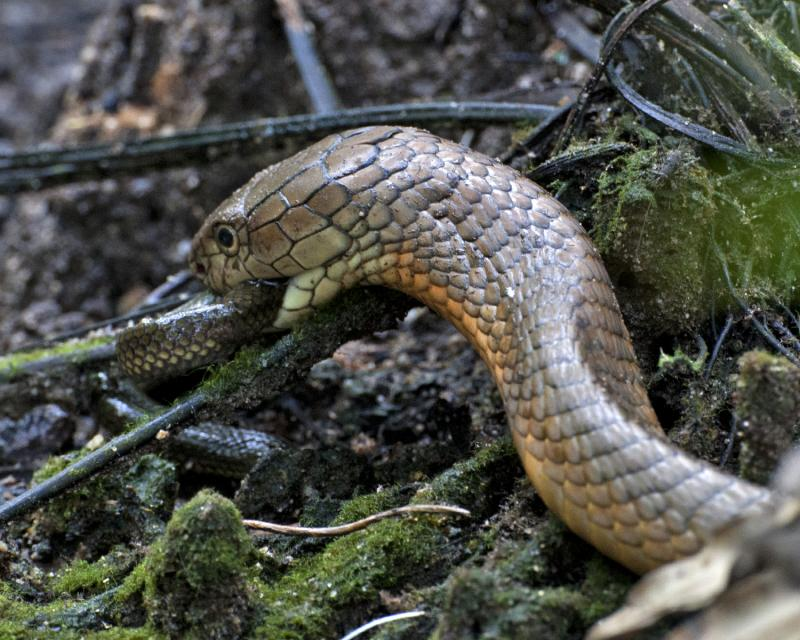

Scientific classification
- Kingdom: Animalia
- Phylum: Chordata
- Class: Reptilia
- Order: Squamata
- Suborder: Serpentes
- Family: Elapidae
- Genus: Ophiophagus
- Species: O. bungarus

Binomial name
- Ophiophagus bungarus (Schlegel, 1837)
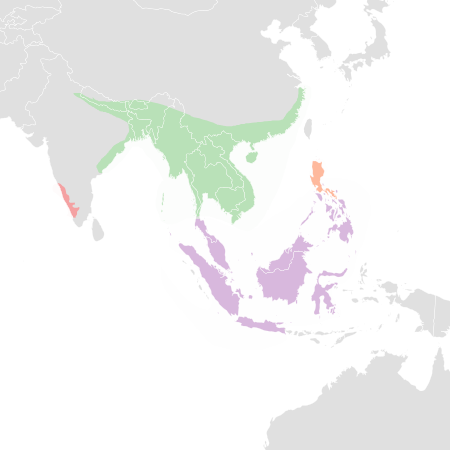
- Range of O. bungarus in purple

= Ophiophagus bungarus =

Species of cobra

Ophiophagus bungarus, the Sunda king cobra, is a species of king cobra that inhabits areas south of the Kra Isthmus or land bridge joining the Malay Peninsula with the rest of southeast Asia or Indochina. The countries it is found in include southern Thailand (deep south), western Malaysia, Singapore and offshore islands, Sumatra, Borneo, Java, Bali, and some of the islands of the southern Philippines Archipelago.

== Description ==
Large adult Ophiophagus bungarus generally lack bands, but some specimens may have narrow pale bands that lack dark edges along the body. Its dorsal scales range from brownish-yellow to mahogany, compared to the dark grey of O. kaalinga. Additionally, at the throat, there is little to no contrast between the ventral and dorsal scales.

Juvenile O. bungarus have higher body band counts at 57–87 bands, compared to O. hannah and O. kaalinga at 27–48 and 28–48 respectively. However, it is less than Juvenile O. salvatana which has 85–86 body bands. They can reach 3.6 metres in length.

O. bungarus also differs in having a lower pterygoid tooth count of 11, compared to O. hannah with 18–21.

=== Etymology ===
The species name "bungarus" comes from the genus name of kraits. It may refer to the fact that, like kraits, it eats other snakes, or to their partially undivided subcaudals.

== Conservation ==
O. bungarus has not been reassessed since being split. Therefore, it shares the status of "Vulnerable" with the other king cobras.
