= Ophiophagus kaalinga =

- From Agumbe, Karnataka, India.

Scientific classification
- Kingdom: Animalia
- Phylum: Chordata
- Class: Reptilia
- Order: Squamata
- Suborder: Serpentes
- Family: Elapidae
- Genus: Ophiophagus
- Species: O. kaalinga

Binomial name
- Ophiophagus kaalinga Gowri Shankar, Das & Ganesh, 2024

Species of snake

Ophiophagus kaalinga, the Western Ghats King Cobra, is a species of king cobra endemic to the Western Ghats of south-western India.

== Description ==
Ophiophagus kaalinga is characterized by pale bands without darker edges on adult snakes, unlike the unbanded O. salvatana and the banded O. hannah, which has dark edges. Additionally, O. kaalinga has fewer pterygoid teeth (12) compared to O. hannah (18–21). Juvenile O. kaalinga also has 28–48 fewer body bands than O. salvatana.

== Etymology ==
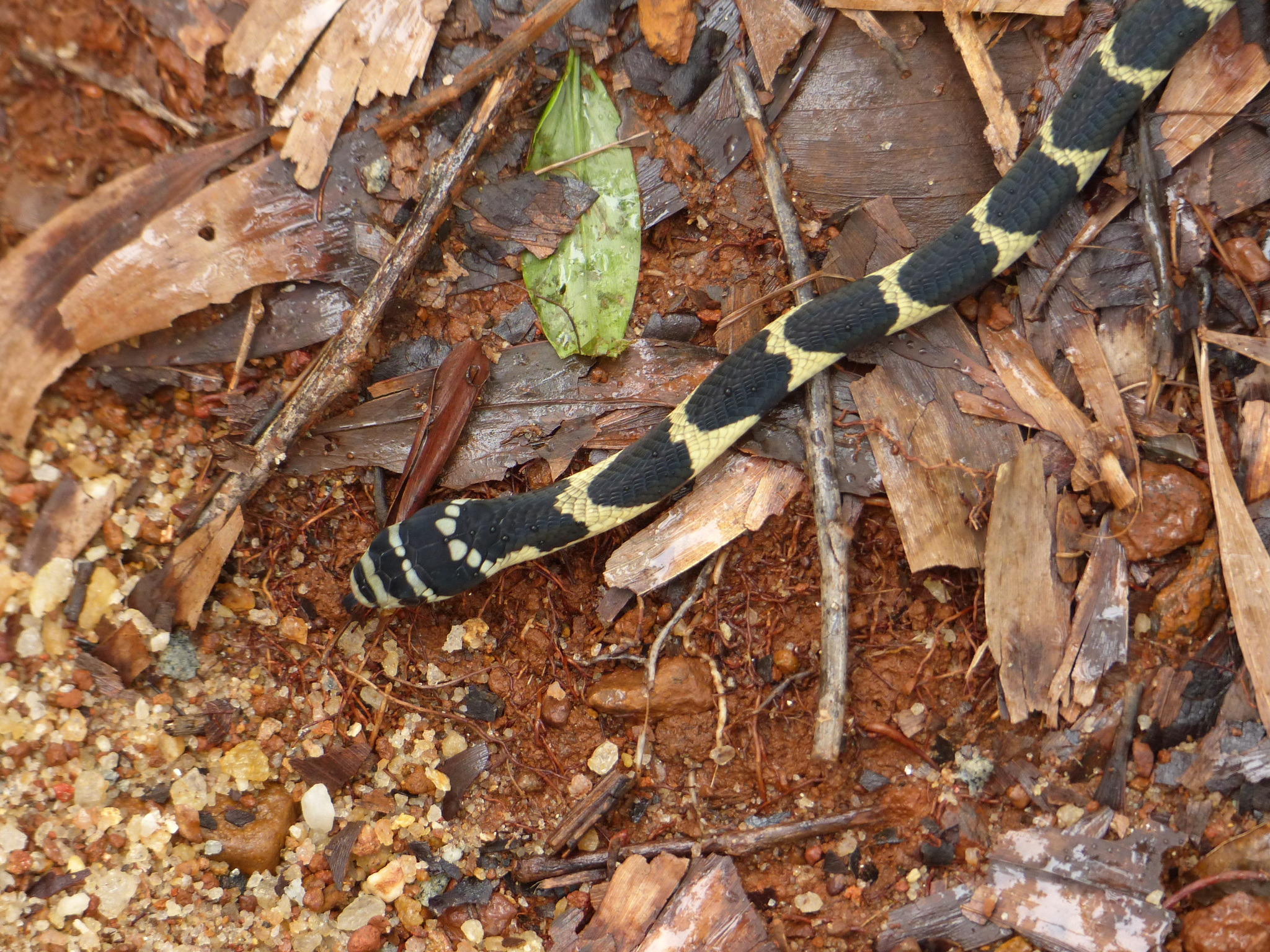
Juvenile

The specific epithet kaalinga comes from the Kannada language of Karnataka, India, meaning "dark" or "black" (from 'Kali' [ಕಾಳಿ] or 'Kari' [ಕರಿ]). It is an abbreviated form of "Kaalinga Sarpa," which is associated with Lord Shiva.

== Distribution and ecology ==
Ophiophagus kaalinga is endemic to the Western Ghats in southwestern India, found in Tamil Nadu, Kerala, Karnataka, Goa, and parts of Maharashtra. Its range extends from the Ashambu hills near Kanyakumari through various mountain ranges, including the Agasthyamalai and Cardamom hills, reaching elevations of about 100 m to 1800 m above sea level. The species is hill-dwelling and thrives in mid-elevation rainforests (500–900 m) but can also be found in lower foothills and montane forests.

== Conservation ==
As a member of the king cobra species complex, the Western Ghats king cobra is also considered as "vulnerable" under the IUCN Red List. Agumbe rainforest research station in Agumbe is one of the dedicated conservation efforts towards this species.
