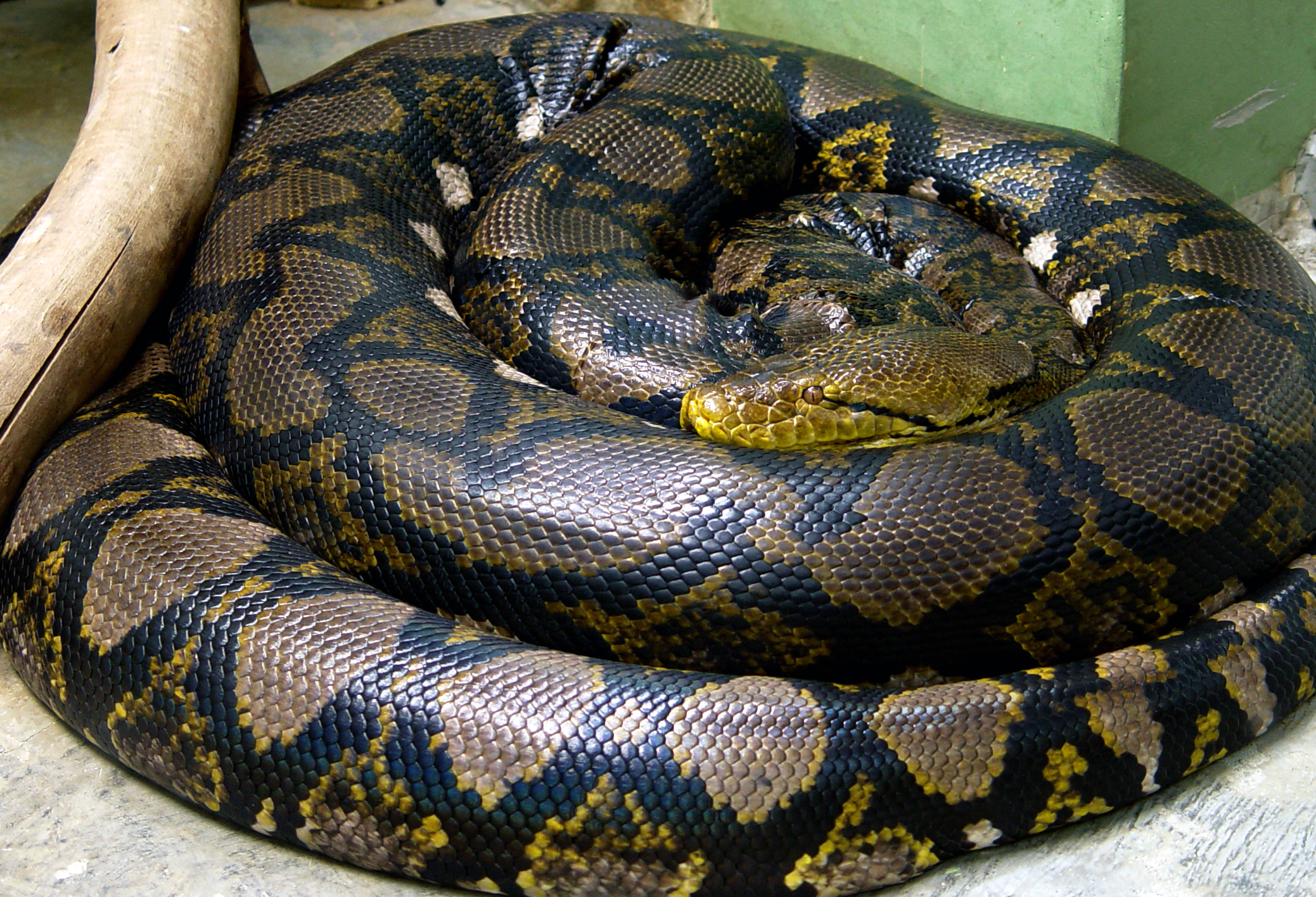

Conservation status
- Least Concern (IUCN 3.1)

Scientific classification
- Kingdom: Animalia
- Phylum: Chordata
- Class: Reptilia
- Order: Squamata
- Suborder: Serpentes
- Family: Pythonidae
- Genus: Malayopython
- Species: M. reticulatus

Binomial name
- Malayopython reticulatus (Schneider, 1801)
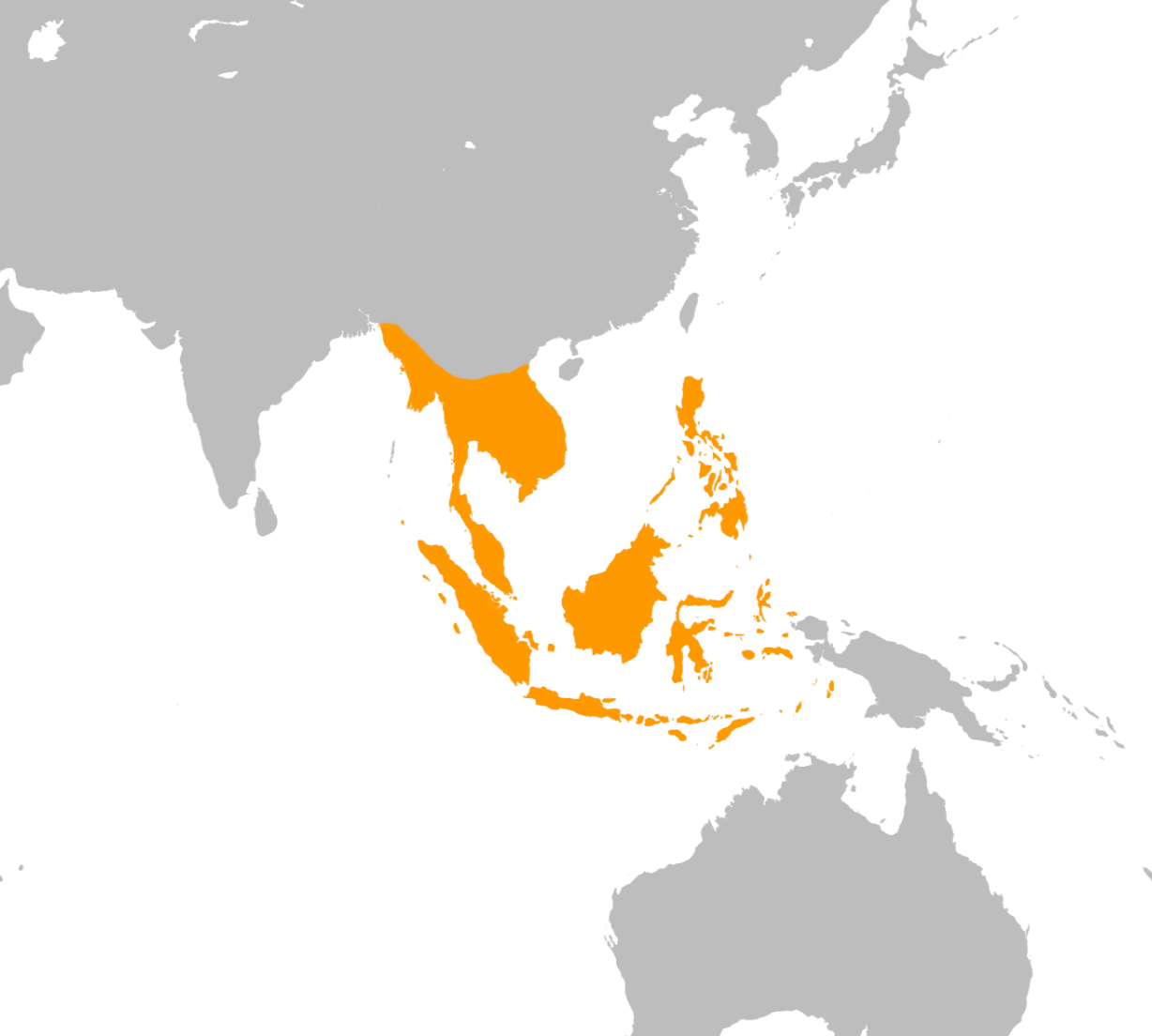
- Range of the reticulated python

Synonyms
- List: Boa reticulata Schneider, 1801; Boa rhombeata Schneider, 1801; Boa phrygia Shaw, 1802; Coluber javanicus Shaw, 1802; Python schneideri Merrem, 1820; Python reticulatus — Gray, 1842; Python reticulatus — Boulenger, 1893; Morelia reticulatus — Welch, 1988; Python reticulatus — Kluge, 1993; Broghammerus reticulatus — Hoser, 2004; Malayopython reticulatus — Reynolds et al., 2014

= Reticulated python =

Reticulated python Temporal range: Pleistocene to recent

Species of snake

The reticulated python (Malayopython reticulatus) is a python species native to South and Southeast Asia. The mainland subspecies is the world's longest snake, and the third heaviest after the green anaconda and Burmese python. The reticulated python is a non-venomous constrictor and an excellent swimmer that has been reported far out at sea. It has colonized many small islands within its range, some of which have resulted in island dwarfism. Because of its wide distribution, it is listed as least concern on the IUCN Red List. In several countries in its range, it is hunted for its skin, for use in traditional medicine, and for sale as pets. Due to this, it is one of the most economically important reptiles worldwide. Humans, including adults, have occasionally been killed by reticulated pythons, and several well-documented cases involve victims being swallowed wholly or partly. Most recent reported fatal predation cases have occurred in Indonesia, especially on Sulawesi and nearby islands.

== Taxonomy ==
The reticulated python was first described in 1801 by Johann Gottlob Theaenus Schneider, who described two zoological specimens held by the Göttingen Museum in 1801 that differed slightly in colour and pattern as separate species, Boa reticulata and Boa rhombeata. The specific name, reticulatus, is Latin and means 'net-like', or reticulated, and is a reference to the complex color pattern. The generic name Python was proposed by François Marie Daudin in 1803. Arnold G. Kluge performed a cladistics analysis on morphological characters and recovered the reticulated python lineage as sister to the genus Python, hence not requiring a new generic name in 1993.

In a 2004 genetics study using cytochrome b DNA, Robin Lawson and colleagues discovered the reticulated python as sister to Australo-Papuan pythons, rather than Python molurus and relatives. Raymond Hoser erected the genus Broghammerus for the reticulated python in 2004, naming it after the German snake breeder Stefan Broghammer, on the basis of dorsal patterns distinct from those of the genus Python, and a dark mid-dorsal line from the rear to the front of the head, and red or orange (rather than brown) iris colour. In 2008, Lesley H. Rawlings and colleagues reanalysed Kluge's morphological data and combined it with genetic material, finding the reticulated clade to be an offshoot of the Australo-Papuan lineage as well. They adopted and redefined the genus name Broghammerus.

Most taxonomists choose to ignore Broghammerus and other names by Hoser, as its description lacked scientific rigour and was not published in a reputable journal. R. Graham Reynolds and colleagues accordingly proposed the name Malayopython for this species and its sister species, the Timor python, in 2014. Malayopython has been recognized by subsequent authors and the Reptile Database. Hoser has argued that Broghammerus was validly published and Malayopython name is invalid as it is a junior synonym. Nevertheless, the name Malayopython remains in use by reliable sources, and Broghammerus is referred to as an invalid nomen nudum.

=== Subspecies ===
Three subspecies have been proposed:

- M. r. reticulatus (Schneider, 1801) – Asian reticulated python
- M. r. jampeanus Auliya et al., 2002 – Kayaudi reticulated python or Tanahjampean reticulated python, about half the length, or according to Auliya et al. (2002), not reaching much more than 2 m (6 ft 7 in) in length. Found on Tanahjampea in the Selayar Archipelago south of Sulawesi. Closely related to M. r. reticulatus of the Lesser Sundas.
- M. r. saputrai Auliya et al., 2002 – Selayer reticulated python, occurs on Selayar Island in the Selayar Archipelago and also in adjacent Sulawesi. This subspecies represents a sister lineage to all other populations of reticulated pythons tested. According to Auliya et al. (2002) it does not exceed 4 m (13 ft 1 in) in length.

The latter two are dwarf subspecies. Apparently, the population of the Sangihe Islands north of Sulawesi represents another such subspecies, which is basal to the P. r. reticulatus plus P. r. jampeanus clade, but it is not yet formally described.

The proposed subspecies M. r. "dalegibbonsi", M. r. "euanedwardsi", M. r. "haydnmacphiei", M. r. "neilsonnemani", M. r. "patrickcouperi", and M. r. "stuartbigmorei" have not found general acceptance.

== Characteristics ==
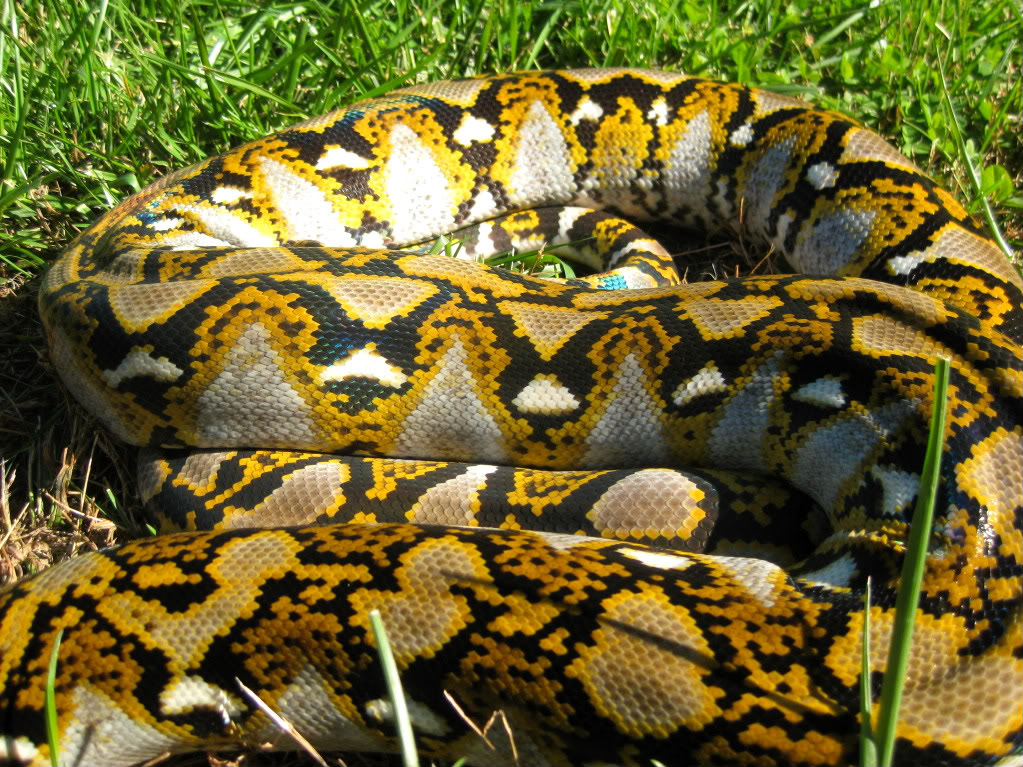
The "reticulated" net-like patterning that gives the reticulated python its name

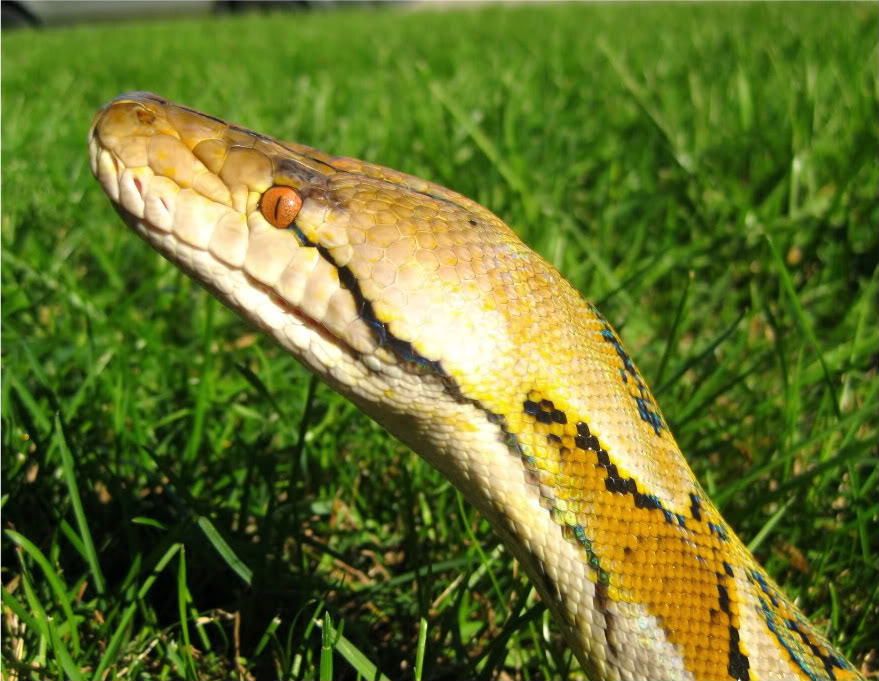
Head of a reticulated python

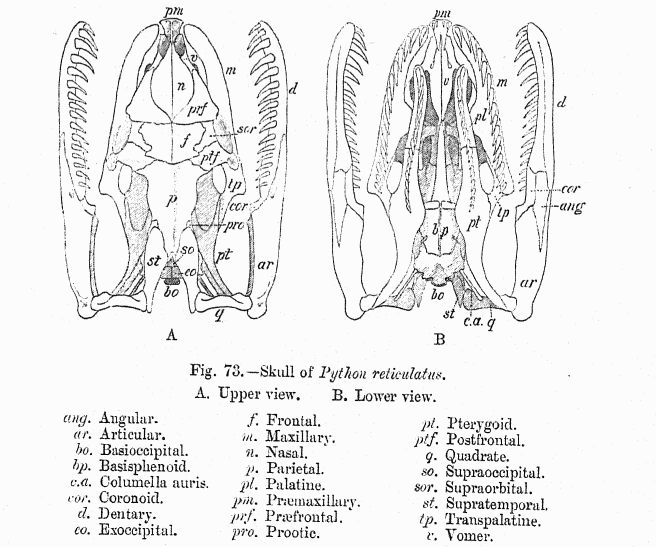
Skull of a reticulated python

The reticulated python has smooth dorsal scales that are arranged in 69–79 rows at midbody. Deep pits occur on four anterior upper labials, on two or three anterior lower labials, and on five or six posterior lower labials.

The reticulated python is the largest snake native to Asia. More than a thousand wild reticulated pythons in southern Sumatra were studied, and estimated to have a length range of 1.5 to 6.5 m (4 ft 11 in to 21 ft 4 in), and a weight range of 1 to 75 kg (2 lb 3 oz to 165 lb 6 oz). Reticulated pythons with lengths more than 6 m (19 ft 8 in) are rare, though according to the Guinness Book of World Records, it is the only extant snake to regularly exceed that length. One of the largest scientifically measured specimens, from Balikpapan, East Kalimantan, Indonesia, was measured under anesthesia at 6.95 m (22 ft 10 in) and weighed 59 kg (130 lb 1 oz) after not having eaten for nearly 3 months; it was captured after having eaten a radio-collared sun bear and was being operated upon to remove the collar from its intestines.

The specimen once widely accepted as the largest-ever "accurately" measured snake, that being Colossus, a specimen kept at the Highland Park Zoo (now the Pittsburgh Zoo and Aquarium) in Pittsburgh, Pennsylvania, during the 1950s and early 1960s, with a peak reported length of 8.7 metres (28 ft 7 in) from a measurement in November 1956, was later shown to have been substantially shorter than previously reported. When Colossus died on 14 April 1964, its body was deposited in the Carnegie Museum of Natural History. At that time, its skeleton was measured and found to be 20 ft 10 in (6.35 m) in total length, and the length of its fresh hide was measured as 23 ft 11 in (7.29 m). The hide tends to stretch from the skinning process, thus may be longer than the snake from which it came – e.g., by roughly 20–40% or more. The previous reports had been constructed by combining partial measurements with estimations to compensate for "kinks", since completely straightening an extremely large live python is virtually impossible. Because of these issues, a 2012 journal article concluded, "Colossus was neither the longest snake nor the heaviest snake ever maintained in captivity." Too large to be preserved with formaldehyde and then stored in alcohol, the specimen was instead prepared as a disarticulated skeleton. The hide was sent to a laboratory to be tanned, but it was either lost or destroyed, and now only the skull and selected vertebrae and ribs remain in the museum's collection. Considerable confusion exists in the literature over whether Colossus was male or female (females tend to be larger). However, the late Neil D. Richmond, Curator of the Section of Amphibians and Reptiles at Carnegie Museum of Natural History, who skinned and skeletonized Colossus, determined at that time that Colossus was definitely male. Numerous reports have been made of larger snakes, but since none of these was measured by a scientist nor any of the specimens deposited at a museum, they must be regarded as unproven and possibly erroneous. In spite of what has been, for many years, a standing offer of a large financial reward (initially $1,000, later raised to $5,000, then $15,000 in 1978 and $50,000 in 1980) for a live, healthy snake 30 ft (9.14 m) or longer by the New York Zoological Society (later renamed as the Wildlife Conservation Society), no attempt to claim this reward has ever been made.

=== Reported sizes ===
Date	Location	Reported length	Reported weight	Reported girth	Scientifically analyzed length	Comments
October 1859	Bayan Lepas, Penang Island, Malaysia	8.534 m (28.00 ft)	Not listed	81.28 cm (32.00 in)	Not listed	Discovered eating a pig on the road to Teluk Kumbar and killed
1912	Sulawesi Island, Indonesia	9.982 m (32.75 ft)	Not listed	30.48 cm (12.00 in)	Not listed	Reported to have been shot near a mining camp. Account given by explorer Henry C Raven. One photo was taken, but the body was not preserved.
1931–1948	Evansville, Indiana, United States	10.236 m (33.58 ft)	303.907 kg (670.00 lb)	Not listed	Not listed	Kept at Mesker Zoo between 1931 and 1948. Exceptional weight claim believed to be in error.
2011	Kansas City, Missouri, United States	7.670 m (25.16 ft)	158.8 kg (350 lb)			Named "Medusa"; considered by the Guinness Book of World Records to be the longest (verified) living snake ever kept in captivity

The colour pattern is a complex geometric pattern that incorporates different colours. The back typically has a series of irregular diamond shapes flanked by smaller markings with light centers. In this species' wide geographic range, much variation of size, colour, and markings commonly occurs.

In zoo exhibits, the colour pattern may seem garish, but in a shadowy jungle environment amid fallen leaves and debris, it allows them to virtually disappear. Called disruptive colouration, it protects them from predators and helps them to catch their prey.

The huge size and attractive pattern of this snake has made it a favorite zoo exhibit, with several individuals claimed to be above 20 ft (6.1 m) in length and more than one claimed to be the largest in captivity. However, due to its huge size, immense strength, aggressive disposition, and the mobility of the skin relative to the body, it is very difficult to get exact length measurements of a living reticulated python, and weights are rarely indicative, as captive pythons are often obese. Claims made by zoos and animal parks are sometimes exaggerated, such as the claimed 14.85 m (48 ft 9 in) snake in Indonesia which was subsequently proven to be about 6.5–7 m (21 ft 4 in – 23 ft 0 in) long. For this reason, scientists do not accept the validity of length measurements unless performed on a dead or anesthetized snake that is later preserved in a museum collection or stored for scientific research.

A reticulated python kept in the United States in Kansas City, Missouri, named "Medusa" is considered by the Guinness Book of World Records to be the longest living snake ever kept in captivity. In 2011 it was reported to measure 7.67 m (25 ft 2 in) and weigh 158.8 kg (350 lb 2 oz).

In 2012, an albino reticulated python, named "Twinkie", housed in Fountain Valley, California, US, was considered to be the largest albino snake in captivity by the Guinness World Records. It measured 7 m (23 ft 0 in) in length and weighed about 168 kg (370 lb).

Dwarf forms of reticulated pythons also occur, from some islands northwest of Australia, and these are being selectively bred in captivity to be much smaller, resulting in animals often referred to as "super dwarfs". Adult super dwarf reticulated pythons are typically between 1.82 and 2.4 m (6 ft 0 in and 7 ft 10 in) in length.

== Distribution and habitat ==
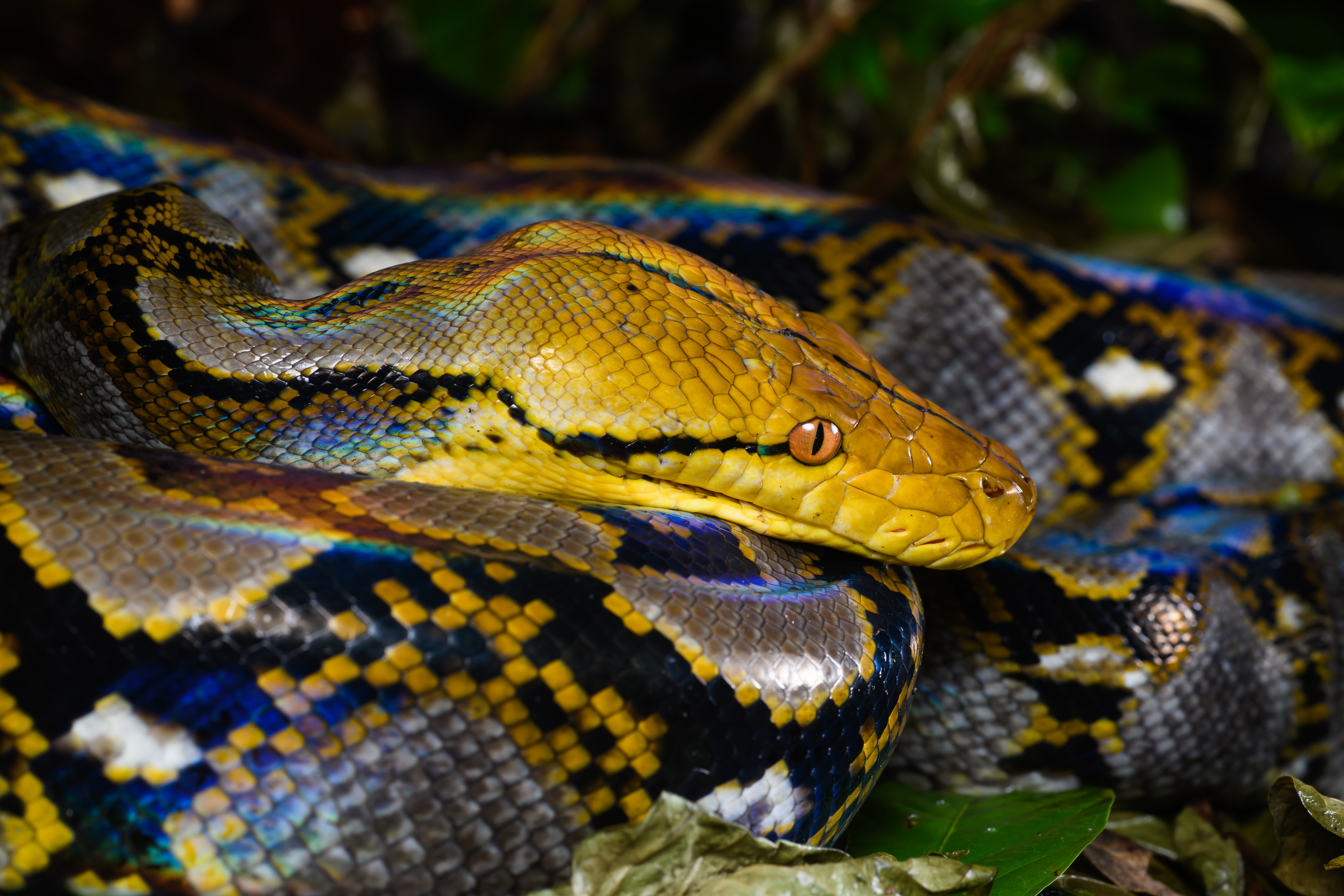

The reticulated python is found in South and Southeast Asia from the Nicobar Islands, India, Bangladesh, Myanmar, Thailand, Laos, Cambodia, Vietnam, Malaysia, and Singapore, east through Indonesia (Sumatra, the Mentawai Islands, the Natuna Islands, Borneo, Sulawesi, Java, Lombok, Sumbawa, Sumba, Flores, Timor, Maluku, Tanimbar Islands), Timor-Leste, and the Philippines (Basilan, Bohol, Cebu, Leyte, Luzon, Mindanao, Mindoro, Negros, Palawan, Panay, Polillo, Samar, Tawi-Tawi). The original description does not include a type locality. The type locality was restricted to "Java" by Brongersma (1972).

Three subspecies have been proposed, but are not recognized in the Integrated Taxonomic Information System. The color and size can vary a great deal among the subspecies described. Geographical location is a good key to establishing the subspecies, as each one has a distinct geographical range.

The reticulated python lives in rainforests, woodlands, and nearby grasslands. It is also associated with rivers and is found in areas with nearby streams and lakes. An excellent swimmer, it has even been reported far out at sea and has consequently colonized many small islands within its range. During the early years of the 20th century, it is said to have been common even in busy parts of Bangkok, sometimes eating domestic animals.

== Behaviour and ecology ==
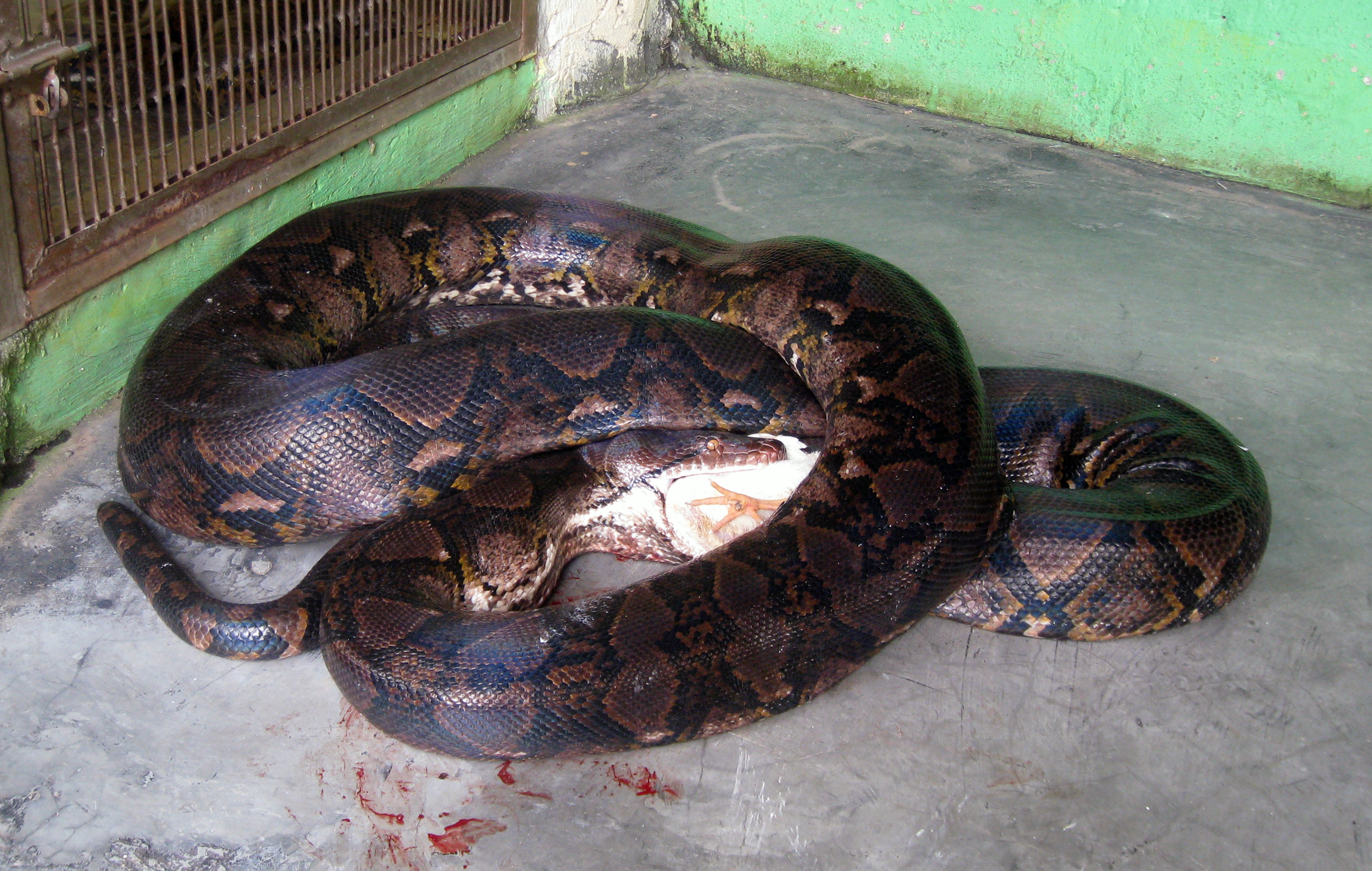
A captive reticulated python eating a chicken

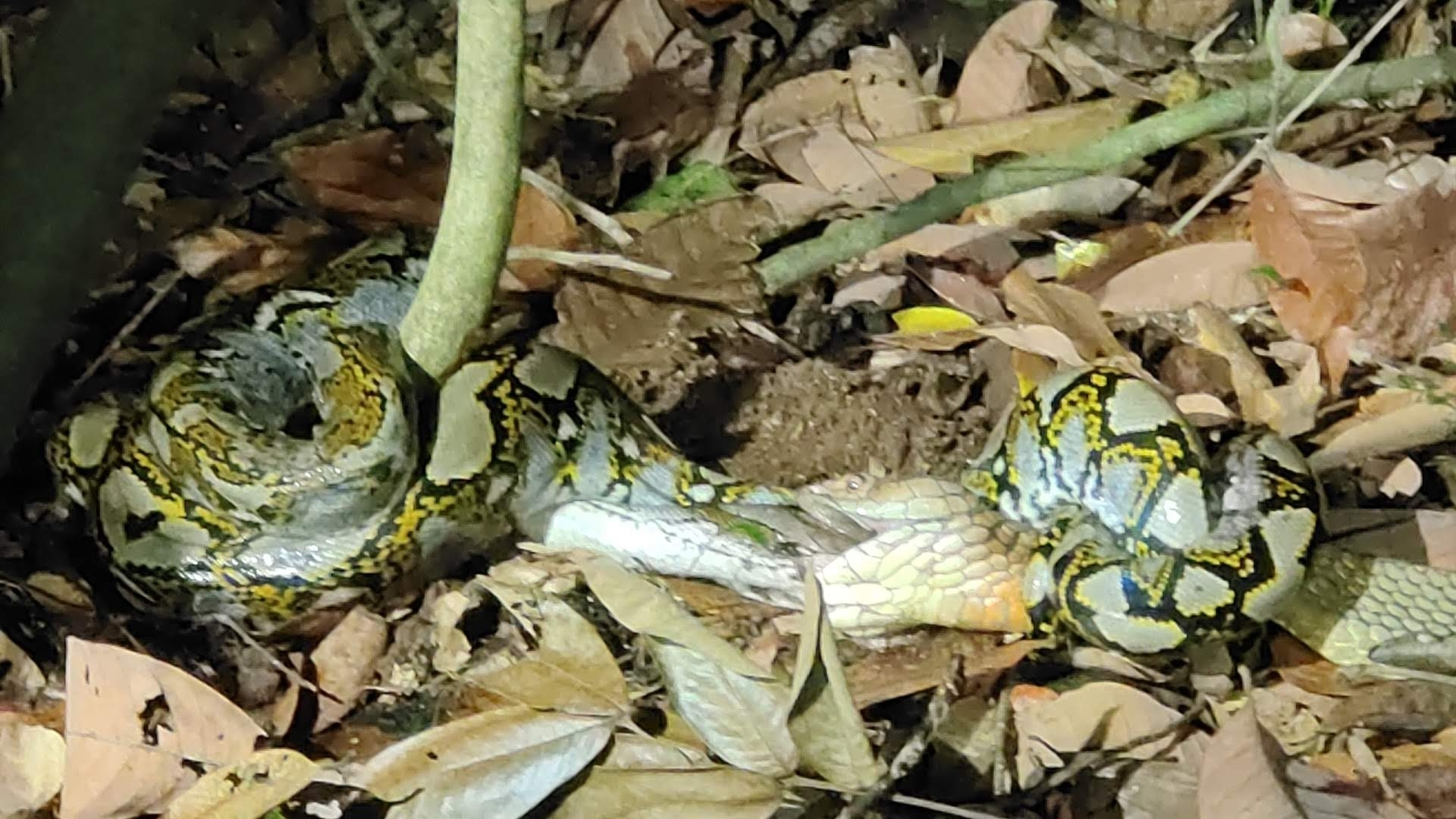
Sunda king cobra eating a reticulated python

=== Diet ===
The reticulated python is an ambush predator, usually waiting until prey wanders within strike range before seizing it in its coils and killing by constriction. Its natural diet includes mammals and occasionally birds. Small specimens up to 3–4 m (9.8–13.1 ft) long eat mainly small mammals such as rats, other rodents, mouse-eared bats, and treeshrews, whereas larger individuals switch to prey such as small Indian civet and binturong, primates, wild boar, and deer species weighing more than 60 kg (130 lb). The reticulated python seems able to swallow prey up to one-quarter its own length and up to its own weight. Near human habitation, it is known to snatch stray chickens, cats, and dogs on occasion. Among the largest documented prey items are a half-starved sun bear of 23 kg (51 lb) that was eaten by a 6.95 m (22.8 ft) individual in East Kalimantan and took some 10 weeks to digest. East Kalimantan has relatively large populations of potential prey species for the reticulated python. The Bornean bearded pig, Muntiacus species, and Tragulus species are common, as well as the southern pig-tailed macaque, civets, Sunda pangolin and other ground dwelling mammals like Old World porcupines. One case of a foraging reticulated python entering a forest hut and taking a child has been reported.

=== Reproduction ===
The reticulated python is oviparous. Adult females lay between 15 and 80 eggs per clutch. At an optimum incubation temperature of 31–32 °C (88–90 °F), the eggs take an average of 88 days to hatch. Hatchlings are at least 0.61 m (2 ft) in length.

== Danger to humans ==
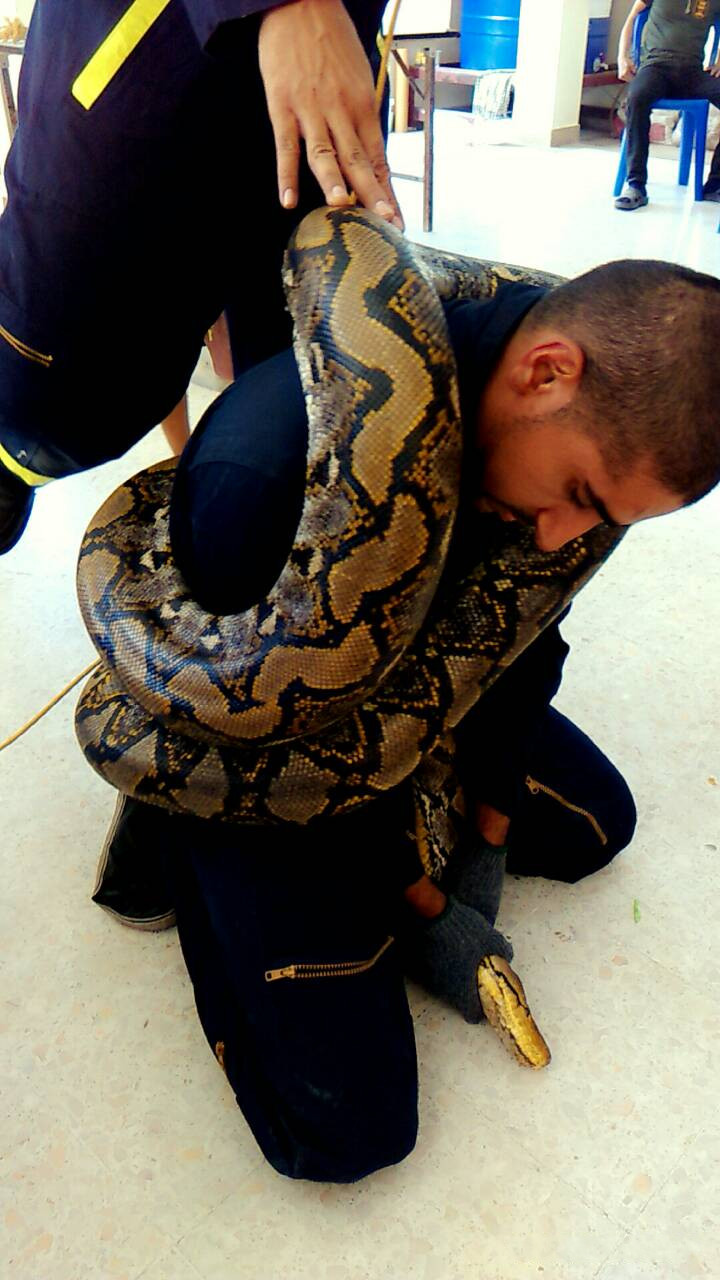
Large reticulated pythons are occasionally found on the outskirts of Bangkok. Usually, a minimum of two people is required to successfully extract such a large snake.

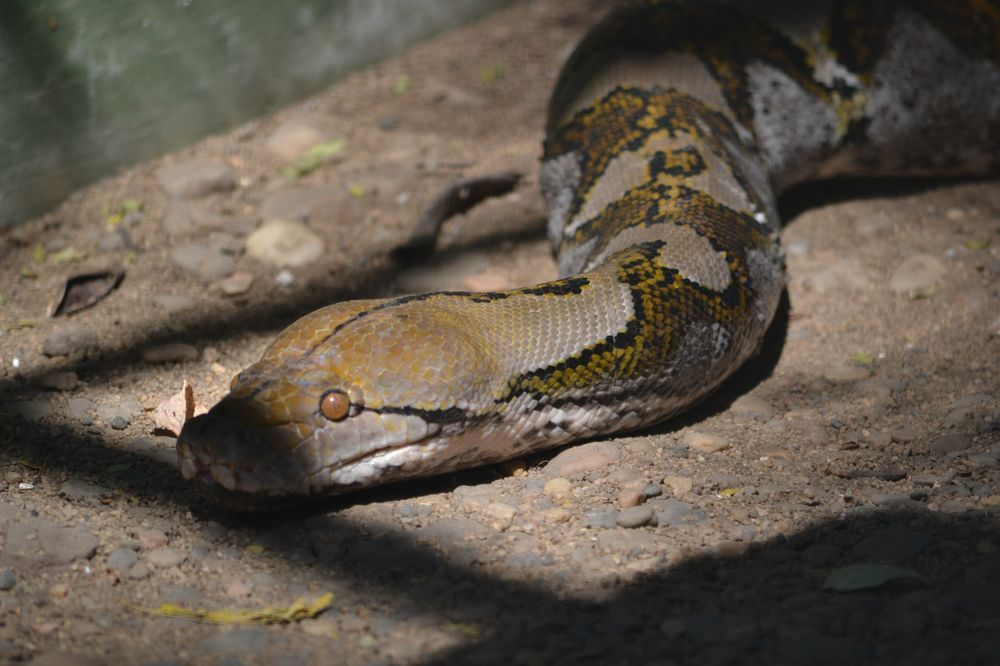
Reticulated python in Pune

The reticulated python is among the few snakes that prey on humans and is the only species of snake for which video and photographic proof exists of them having consumed humans. In 2015, the species was added to the US Injurious Wildlife List under 18. U.S.C. 42, prohibiting import into the US and interstate transport within the US due to its "injurious" history with humans. The interstate transport prohibition was rescinded in 2017 due to a court decision. Attacks on humans in captivity are not common. Wild pythons, however, are known to sometimes prey on humans, particularly in their natural habitat in Sulawesi, Indonesia. Considering the known maximum prey size, a full-grown reticulated python can open its jaws wide enough to swallow a human, but the width of the shoulders of some adult Homo sapiens can pose a problem for even a snake with sufficient size. Reports of human fatalities and human consumption (the latest examples of consumption of adult human beings well authenticated) include:

- A report of a visit of Antonio van Diemen, Governor-General of the Dutch East India Company, to the Banda Islands in 1638, includes a description of an enslaved woman who, when tending to a garden on the volcanic island of Gunung Api, was strangled by a snake of "24 houtvoeten" (around 7.315 m/ 24 ft) in length, and then swallowed whole. The snake, having become slow after ingesting such a large prey, was subsequently shot by Dutch soldiers and brought to the Governor-General to be looked at, with its victim still inside. Although less reliable than this first-hand document, several early published travel journals describe similar episodes.
- In early 20th-century Indonesia: On Salibabu island, North Sulawesi, a 14-year-old boy was killed and supposedly eaten by a specimen 5.17 m (17.0 ft) in length. Another incident involved a woman reputedly eaten by a "large reticulated python", but few details are known.
- In the early 1910s or in 1927, a jeweller went hunting with his friends and was apparently eaten by a 6 m (20 ft) python after he sought shelter from a rainstorm in or under a tree. Supposedly, he was swallowed feet-first, perhaps the easiest way for a snake to swallow a human.
- Among a small group of Aeta peoples in the Philippines, six deaths by pythons were said to have been documented within a period of 40 years, plus one who died later of an infected bite.
- In September 1995, a 29-year-old rubber tapper from the southern Malaysian state of Johor was reported to have been killed by a large reticulated python. The victim had apparently been caught unaware and was squeezed to death. The snake had coiled around the lifeless body with the victim's head gripped in its jaws when it was stumbled upon by the victim's brother. The python, reported as measuring 7.0 m (23 ft) long and weighing more than 140 kg (300 lb), was killed soon after by the arriving police, who shot it four times.
- In October 2003, a woman was reported to be eaten by a giant reticulated python at Sajek Valley in Rangamati Hill District, Bangladesh, when she was collecting paddy crops with her husband. People came to help and retrieved the woman's body from the python's belly.
- In October 2008, a woman from Virginia Beach, USA, appeared to have been killed by a 4.0 m (13 ft) pet reticulated python. The apparent cause of death was asphyxiation. The snake was later found in the bedroom in an agitated state.
- In January 2009, a 3-year-old boy was wrapped in the coils of a 5.5 m (18 ft) pet reticulated python, turning blue. The boy's mother, who had been petsitting the python on behalf of a friend, rescued him by gashing the python with a knife. The snake was later euthanized because of its wounds.
- In December 2013, a 59-year-old security guard was strangled to death while trying to capture a python near the Bali Hyatt, a luxury hotel on Indonesia's resort island. The incident happened around 3 am as the 4.5-m (15-ft) python was crossing a road near the hotel. The victim had offered to help capture the snake, which had been spotted several times before near the hotel in the Sanur, Bali, area and escaped back into nearby bushes.
- In March 2017, the body of Akbar Salubiro, a 25-year-old farmer in Central Mamuju Regency, West Sulawesi, Indonesia, was found inside the stomach of a 7 m (23 ft) reticulated python. He had been declared missing from his palm tree plantation, and the people searching for him found the python the next day with a large bulge in its stomach. They killed the python and found the whole body of the missing farmer inside. This was the first fully confirmed case of a person being eaten by a python. The process of retrieving the body from the python's stomach was documented by pictures and videos taken by witnesses.
- In June 2018, a 54-year-old Indonesian woman in Muna Island, Southeast Sulawesi, Indonesia, was killed and eaten by a 7 m (23 ft) python. The woman went missing one night while working in her garden, and the next day, a search party was organized after some of her belongings were found abandoned in the garden. The python was found near the garden with a large bulge in its body. The snake was killed and carried into town, where it was cut open, revealing the woman's body completely intact.
- In June 2020, a 16-year-old Indonesian boy was attacked and killed by a 7 m (23 ft) long python in Bombana Regency, Southeast Sulawesi, Indonesia. The incident took place near a waterfall at Mount Kahar in Rumbia sub-district. The victim was separated from his four friends in the woods. When he screamed, his friends came to help and found him encoiled by a large python. Villagers came to help and managed to kill the snake using a parang machete. However, the victim had already suffocated.
- In October 2022, a 52-year-old woman in Terjun Gajah village, Betara Subdistrict, West Tanjung Jabung Regency, Jambi, Indonesia, was killed and swallowed whole by a 6 m (20 ft) reticulated python. She went to tap rubber sap on 23 October 2022 and did not return home after sunset. After she was reported missing for a day and a night, a search party discovered a large python with a bulge in its body in a jungle near the rubber plantation. The villagers immediately killed and dissected the python and discovered the intact body of the missing woman inside. Villagers feared more large pythons might be present because farmers previously had reported two goats missing.
- In June 2024, a woman of Kalempang village in South Sulawesi province in Indonesia went missing, and her body was discovered inside a reticulated python. 3 weeks later, in July 2024, another woman was discovered inside a python's stomach in South Sulawesi. In August 2024, an elderly woman was found dead after a predatory attempt by a 4 m (13 ft) long python. The snake had killed the victim and tried to swallow her, but could not get over the shoulders, regurgitating the body instead. 2 weeks later another woman in Jambi province was killed by a 5 m (16 ft) python, which managed to swallow half of her body before being found and killed by the villagers. In November 2024, a 30-year-old man was killed and swallowed whole by a 7 m (23 ft) long specimen, the first recorded case of an adult male being eaten since 2017.
- In April 2025, Hasiah, a 66-year-old woman in Sidenreng Rappang Regency, South Sulawesi, Indonesia, was killed and swallowed by a python approximately 6 m (20 ft) long. She had gone to a garden to collect rope for tying wood and did not return. Residents later found a python with an enlarged abdomen, killed it, and recovered her body from inside the snake.
- In July 2025, a man was killed and swallowed whole by a 8 m (26 ft) reticulated python in Majapahit Village, Batauga, southeastern Sulawesi.
- In January 2026, a 34-year-old farmer identified as MS was killed by a python of about 5 m (16 ft) in Bangga village, Dolo Selatan, Sigi Regency, Central Sulawesi, Indonesia. The victim was reportedly attacked while resting in his garden. When found, the snake was still constricting and partly swallowing him; after it was cut by residents, it regurgitated the victim's body.
- In June 2026, Elisabet Yamalau, a 44-year-old woman in Ratahaya village, Taliabu Barat, Pulau Taliabu Regency, North Maluku, Indonesia, was killed by a python approximately 7.8 m (26 ft) long while moving cattle in a garden. Her husband later found the snake with part of her body still in its mouth, killed the snake, and recovered her body, but she was already dead.

== In captivity ==
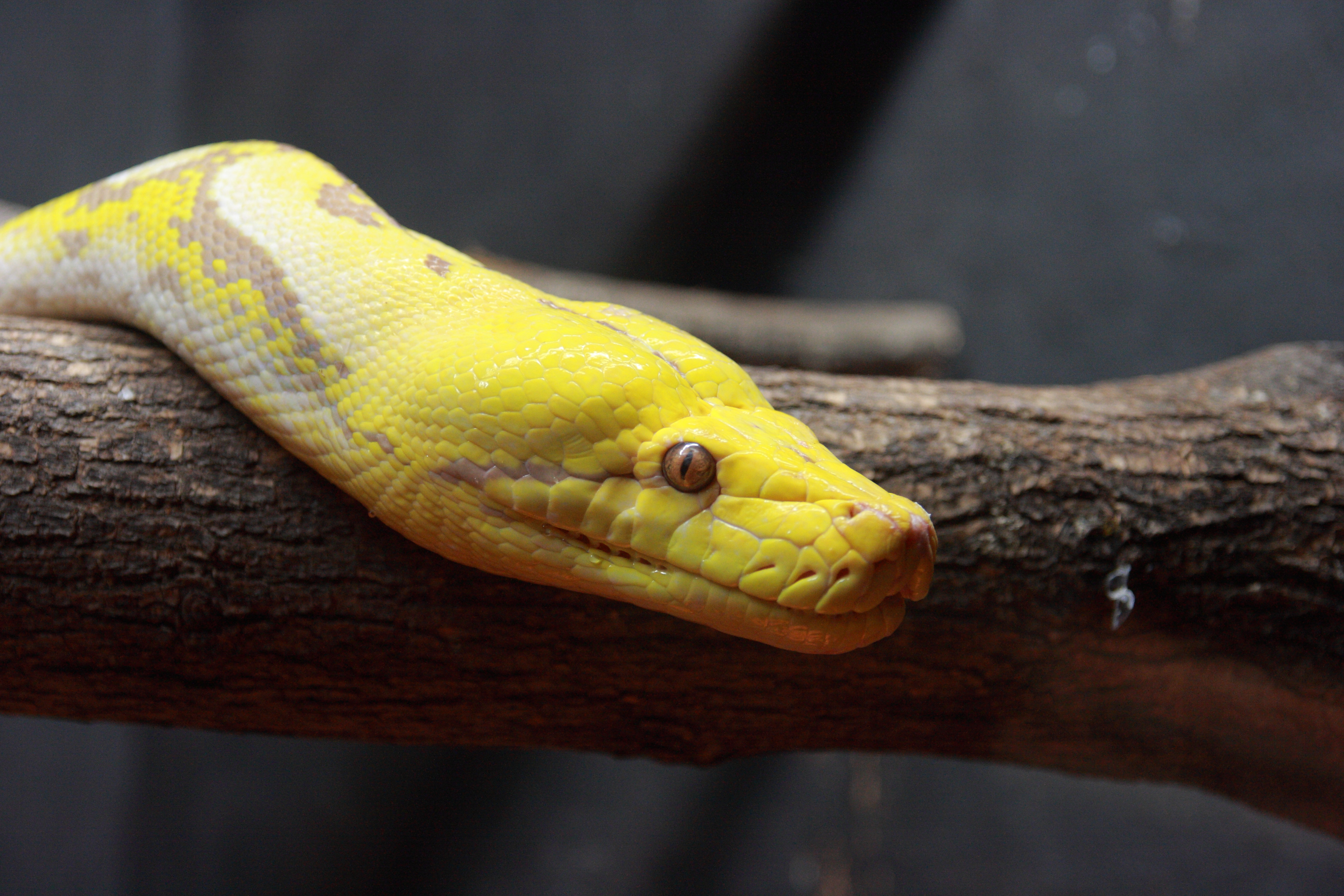
Reticulated python with an unusual color pattern: Various color patterns are found in captive-bred specimens – some brought about by selective breeding.

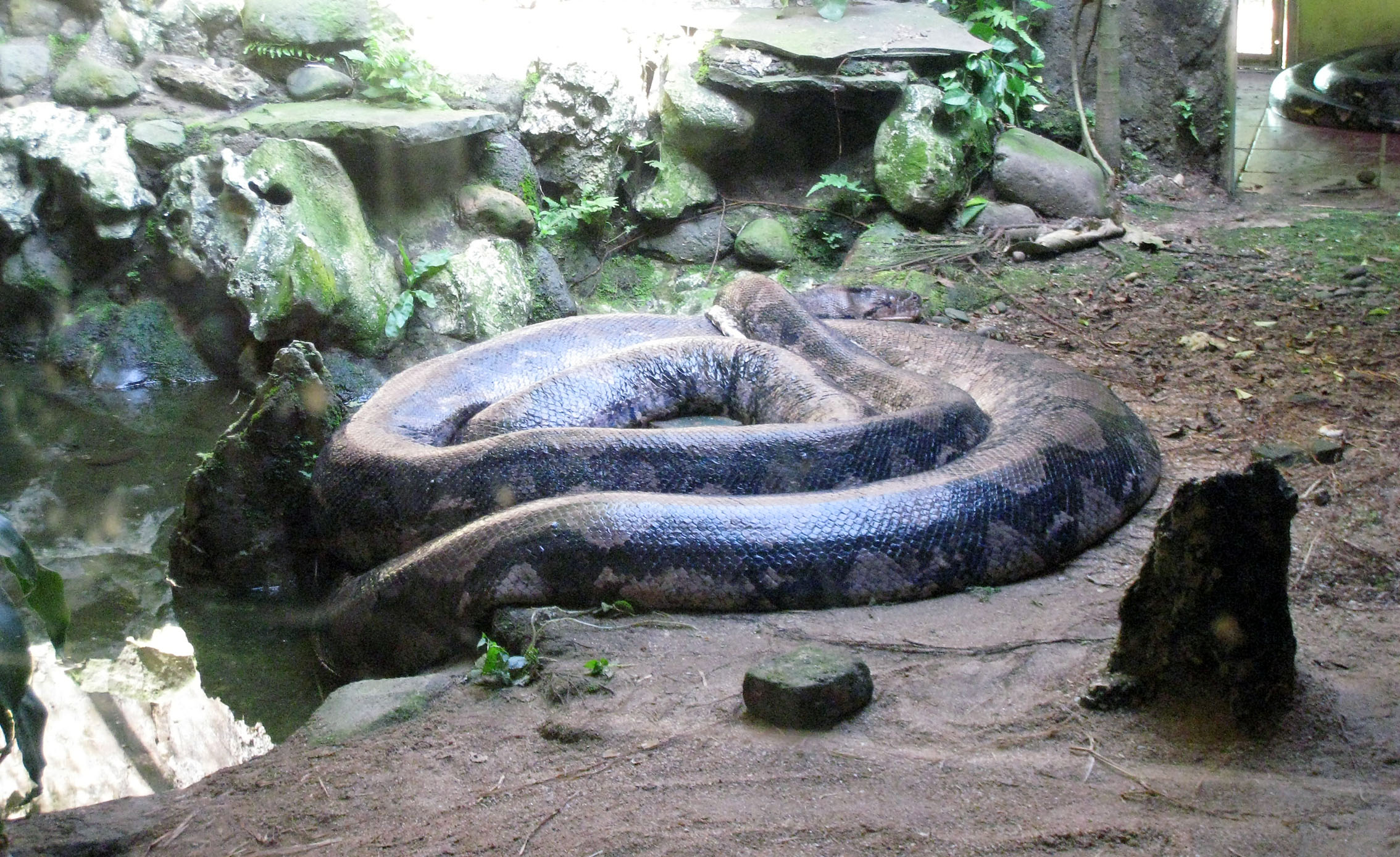
In Ragunan Zoo, Terrarium, South Jakarta, Indonesia

Increased popularity of the reticulated python in the pet trade is due largely to increased efforts in captive breeding and selectively bred mutations such as the "albino" and "tiger" strains. Other notable color mutations recorded in this species include "sunfire", "motley", "Aztec", "ocelot", "rainbow", and "goldenchild". Some mutations, such as the "BEL" (black eyed leucistic) mutations are seldom bred due to the discovery that they develop fatal gastrointestinal issues upon reaching adulthood. The "jaguar" color mutation is likewise controversial in the breeding of captive reticulated pythons, as certain specimens will develop neurological problems and osseous inner ears, similar to the "Spider" mutation that occurs in the ball python. It remains unclear as to why some individual pythons with the jaguar mutation display neurological issues associated with this genetic trait and others do not.

Smaller animals such as the proposed "super dwarf" subspecies found on small islands are likewise popular due to their smaller size, as they grow to a fraction of the lengths and weights of their mainland kin due to genetics, limited space and prey availability. Dwarf and super dwarf reticulated pythons are likewise defined for captive animals as any reticulated pythons with at least 50 percent lineage hailing from seven select islands in the Selayer island chain near Sulawesi. It can make a good captive, but keepers working with adults from mainland populations should have previous experience with large constrictors to ensure safety to both animal and keeper. Although its interactivity and beauty draws much attention, some feel it is unpredictable. The python can bite and possibly constrict if it feels threatened, or mistakes a hand for food. While not venomous, large pythons can inflict serious injuries by biting, sometimes requiring stitches.

== See also ==
- List of largest snakes
- Burmese python
