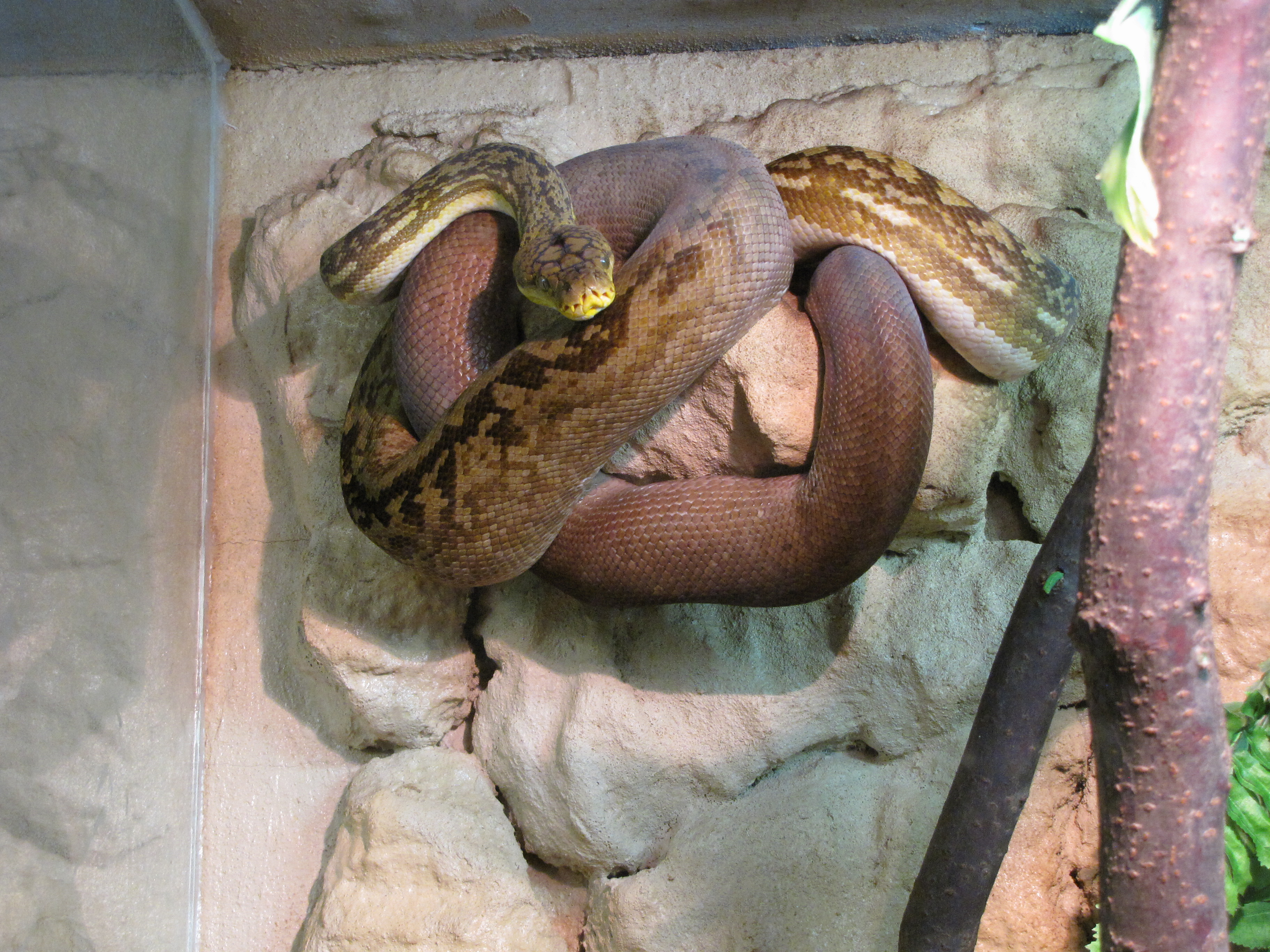
- Malayopython timoriensis in a zoo

Conservation status
- Vulnerable (IUCN 3.1)

Scientific classification
- Kingdom: Animalia
- Phylum: Chordata
- Class: Reptilia
- Order: Squamata
- Suborder: Serpentes
- Family: Pythonidae
- Genus: Malayopython
- Species: M. timoriensis

Binomial name
- Malayopython timoriensis (W. Peters, 1876)

Synonyms
- Liasis amethystinus var. timoriensis W. Peters, 1876; Liasis Petersii Hubrecht, 1879; Python timorensis — Boulenger, 1893; Python timoriensis — F. Werner, 1899; Python timoriensis — Stimson, 1969; Australiasis timoriensis — Wells & Wellington, 1984; Morelia timoriensis — Welch, 1988; P [ython]. timoriensis — Kluge, 1993; Broghammerus timoriensis — Rawlings et al., 2008

= Timor python =

Species of snake

The Timor python (Malayopython timoriensis) is a Malayopython species native to Southeast Asia. It is a dwarf species, and no subspecies are recognized as being valid. It is a nonvenomous constrictor and not considered dangerous to humans.

== Taxonomy ==
Liasis amethystinus var. timoriensis was the scientific name proposed by Wilhelm Peters in 1876.

Authors of a phylogenetic study suggested that the Timor python together with the reticulated python (Malayopython reticulatus) should be moved to a distinct genus Broghammerus. Subsequent phylogenetic analyses have supported the separation of the Timor and reticulated pythons from genus Python. However, Broghammerus is considered an invalid name by most authorities, so that this clade was formally renamed to Malayopython in 2014, a decision that was followed by many authors.

== Description ==
The Timor python is a fairly long, over 2.1 m (7 ft), but relatively thin python. It has a series of heat-sensing pits between its nostrils and mouth used to find warm-blooded prey in total darkness. It is cold-blooded.

== Distribution ==
The Timor python is distributed on the Lesser Sunda Islands of Flores, Lomblen and Timor.

== Behavior and ecology ==
The Timor python is partly arboreal.

Captive Timor pythons have been known to accept birds and small mammals.

The Timor python is oviparous.
