= Ophiophagus salvatana =

Scientific classification
- Kingdom: Animalia
- Phylum: Chordata
- Class: Reptilia
- Order: Squamata
- Suborder: Serpentes
- Family: Elapidae
- Genus: Ophiophagus
- Species: O. salvatana

Binomial name
- Ophiophagus salvatana Gowri Shankar, Das & Wüster, 2024

Species of snake

The Luzon king cobra (Ophiophagus salvatana) is a species of king cobra that is endemic to the island of Luzon in northern Philippines.

== Taxonomy ==
The Luzon king cobra was recognized as a distinct species in an article published in the European Journal of Taxonomy on October 16, 2024.

=== Etymology ===
The species name "salvatana" is the name for king cobra in the Tagalog language.

== Description ==
The Luzon king cobra can grow to a length of up to 10 ft (3.0 m). The Luzon king cobra lacks pale bands along the body, and fewer pterygoid teeth only having 11 compared to the other species having 18-21.

== Distribution and habitat ==
The Luzon king cobra is found only in Luzon and is one of two species of king cobra found in the Philippines, with the other being the Sunda king cobra (Ophiophagus bungarus).

== Conservation ==
As a member of the king cobra species complex, the Luzon king cobra is also considered as "vulnerable" under the IUCN Red List. However due to the fact this was before the fact the species split it may need reassessment, as the Luzon king cobra has a more restrictive range.
