= Blue-winged grasshopper =

Blue-winged grasshopper can refer to several species:

- Oedipoda caerulescens, a species from Europe, northern Africa, and western and central Asia
- Trimerotropis cyaneipennis, also known as blue crackler, a species from North America
- Tropidacris collaris, a large species from South America

== See also ==
- Leprus intermedius, the Saussure's blue-winged grasshopper, from North America
- Leprus wheelerii, the Wheeler's blue-winged grasshopper, from North America
- Trimerotropis arizonensis, the Colorado River blue-wing grasshopper, from North America
- Trimerotropis leucophaea, the Inyo blue-wing grasshopper, from North America
