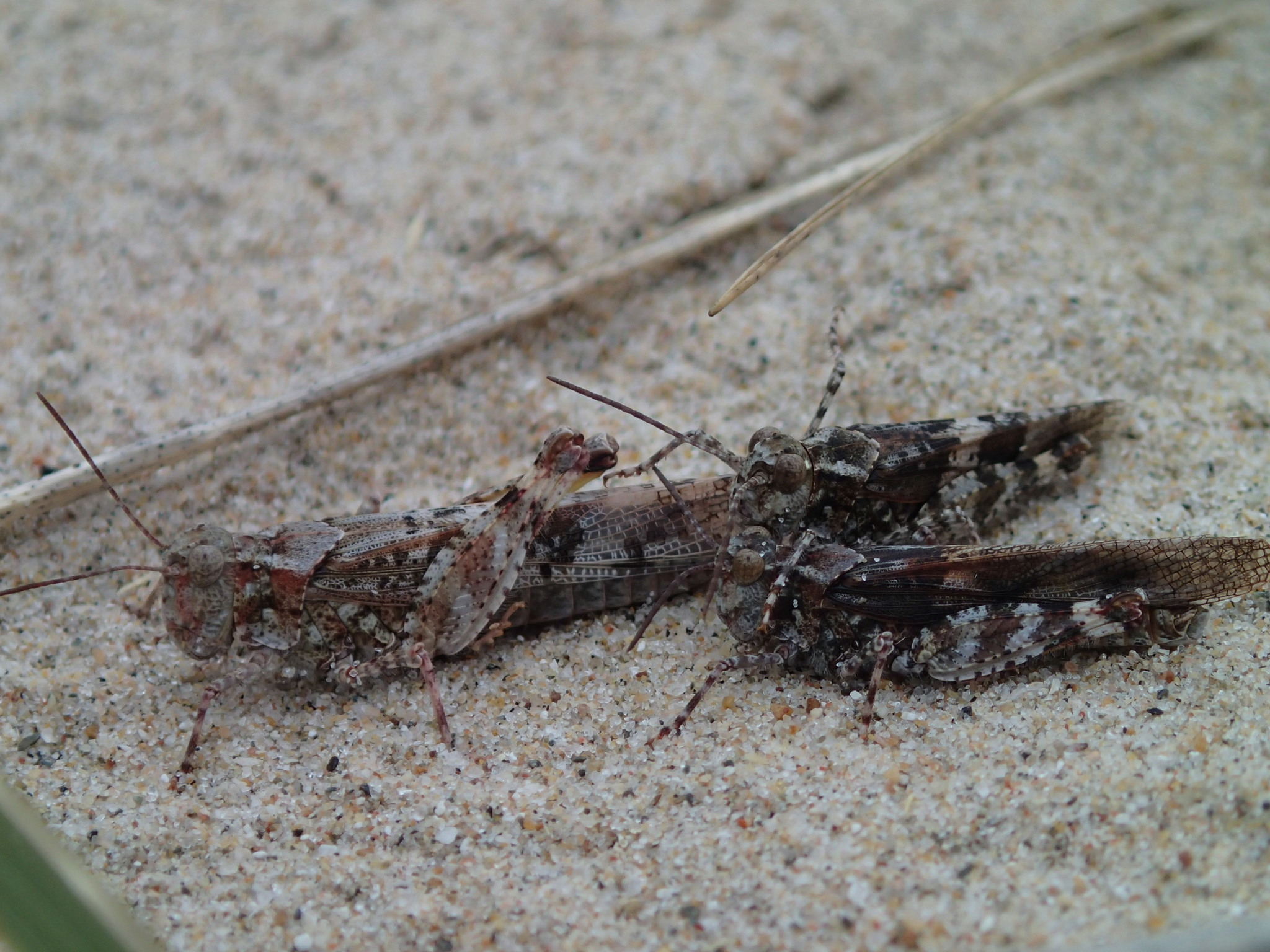

Conservation status
- Apparently Secure (NatureServe)

Scientific classification
- Kingdom: Animalia
- Phylum: Arthropoda
- Clade: Pancrustacea
- Class: Insecta
- Order: Orthoptera
- Suborder: Caelifera
- Family: Acrididae
- Tribe: Trimerotropini
- Genus: Trimerotropis
- Species: T. huroniana

Binomial name
- Trimerotropis huroniana E. M. Walker, 1902

= Trimerotropis huroniana =

Species of grasshopper

Trimerotropis huroniana, known generally as the lake Huron locust or great lakes grasshopper, is a species of band-winged grasshopper in the family Acrididae. It is found in Wisconsin and Michigan in the United States, and Ontario in Canada.

== Distribution ==
This species is endemic to the Great Lakes area, living along the shores of Lake Huron, Lake Michigan, and Lake Superior in open dune habitats.

In Canada, where it is federally listed as Threatened under the Species At Risk Act, it is found at approximately 10 sites. This includes Pancake Bay, Manitoulin Island, and Great Duck Island.

This species is replaced by T. maritima along parts of the southern shore of Lake Michigan with very little overlap between the two species. A similar distribution pattern was noted along the west shore of Lake Huron in the Thumb region of Michigan in the 1920s, however more recent surveys indicate neither species are present in this region in the current day.

Historical populations existed at various sites including Traverse City, Wasaga Beach, Sauble Beach, and Giant Tomb's Island.

== Description ==
Grey to brown in colour, this distinctive species ranges in size from 24 mm to 40 mm, with females generally larger than males. Its hind wings are pale yellow, black, and translucent.

== Biology ==
The species has been noted to feed on plants including Ammophila brevigulata, Calamovilfa longifolia, and Artemisa campestris.

Males court females through stridulation and display flights. Eggs are laid in the sand, where they overwinter and emerge the following spring as nymphs. The insects reach adulthood in late July to August after molting through 5 instars.
