= Trimerotropis helferi =

Scientific classification
- Kingdom: Animalia
- Phylum: Arthropoda
- Clade: Pancrustacea
- Class: Insecta
- Order: Orthoptera
- Suborder: Caelifera
- Family: Acrididae
- Tribe: Trimerotropini
- Genus: Trimerotropis
- Species: T. helferi

Binomial name
- Trimerotropis helferi Strohecker, 1960

Trimerotropis helferi (Microtes helferi) or Helfer's dune grasshopper is light grey and tan. The head is large. The legs, sterna and pleura are covered with long white hairs. The legs are also annulated with black. The female is larger than the male. The length of the body is 19 mm (0.75 in).
