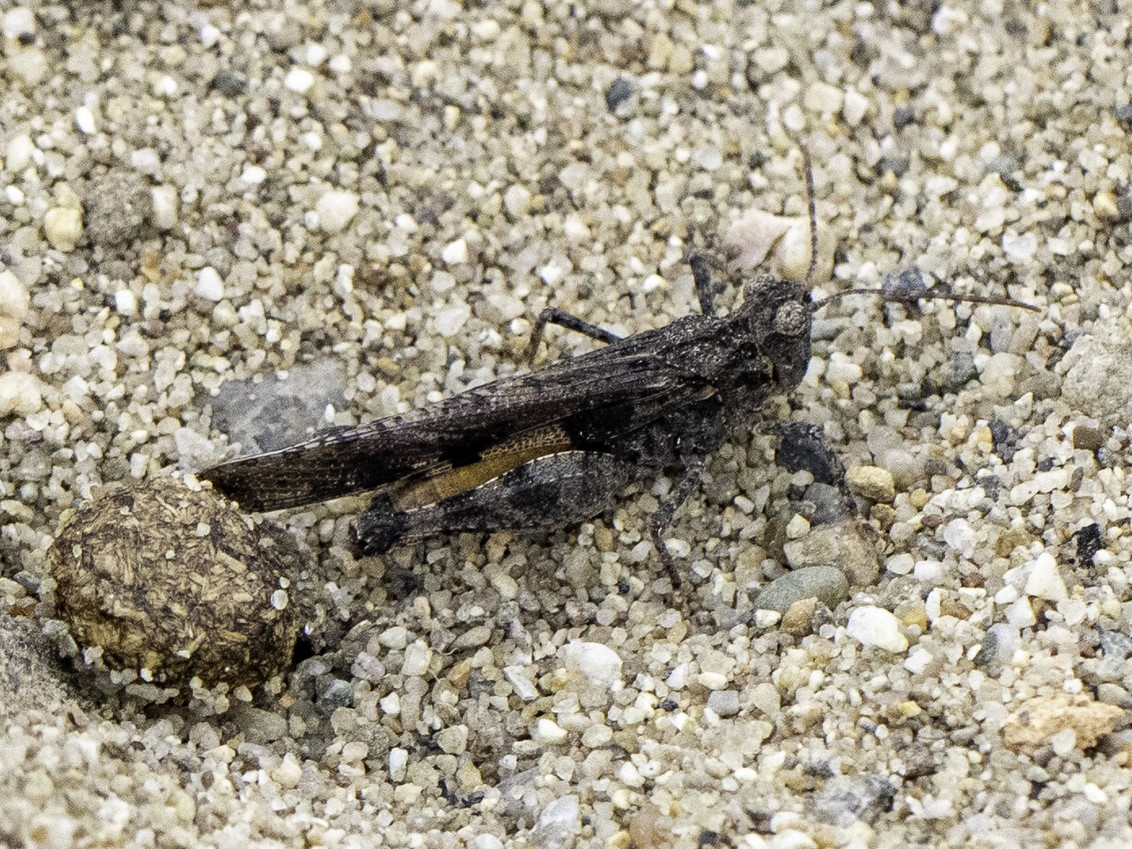

Scientific classification
- Kingdom: Animalia
- Phylum: Arthropoda
- Clade: Pancrustacea
- Class: Insecta
- Order: Orthoptera
- Suborder: Caelifera
- Family: Acrididae
- Tribe: Trimerotropini
- Genus: Conozoa
- Species: C. texana

Binomial name
- Conozoa texana Bruner, 1889

= Conozoa texana =

Species of grasshopper

Conozoa texana, the cristate grasshopper, is a species of band-winged grasshopper in the family Acrididae. It is found in Central America and North America.
