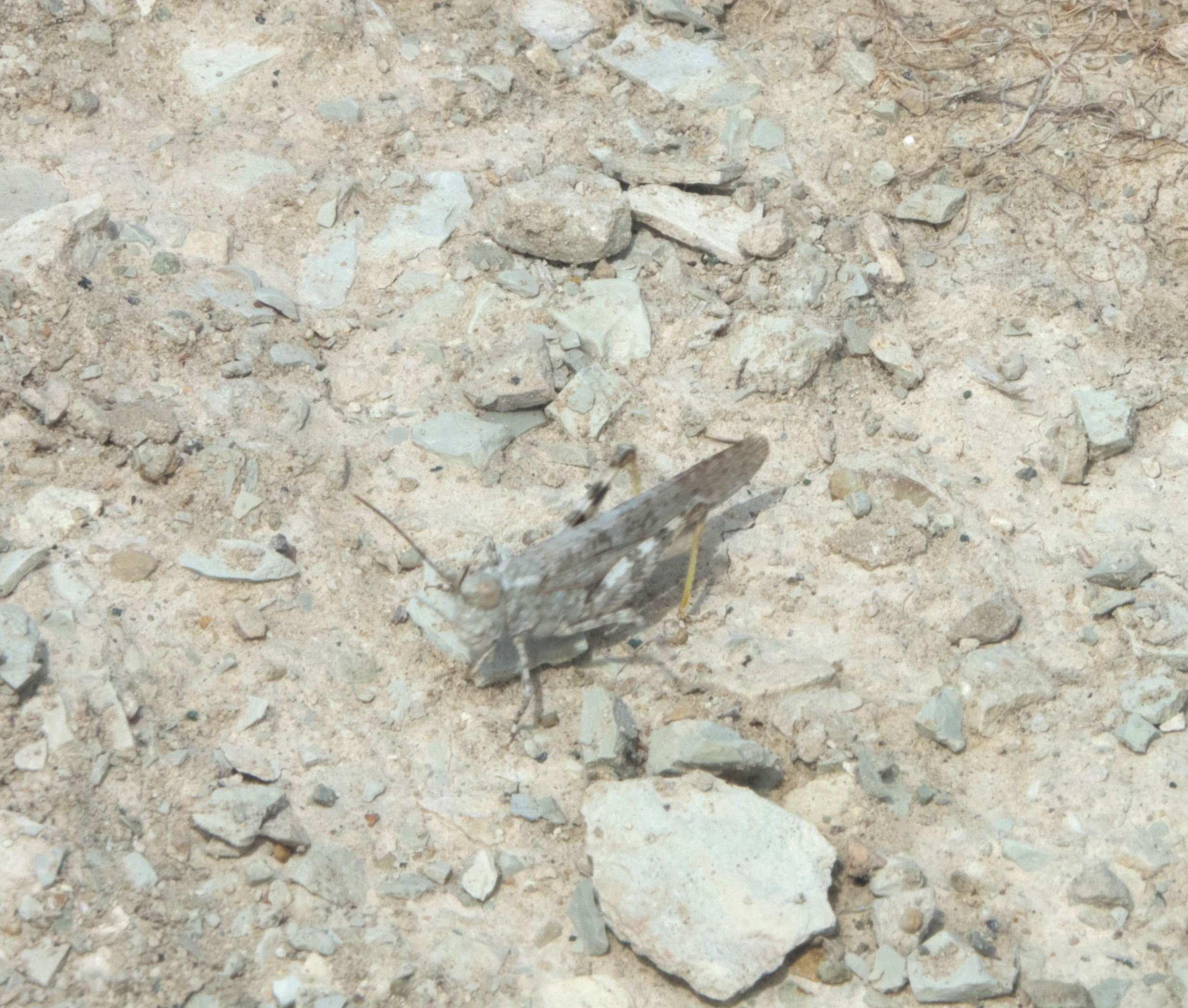
- Trimerotropis sparsa, Wyoming

Scientific classification
- Domain: Eukaryota
- Kingdom: Animalia
- Phylum: Arthropoda
- Class: Insecta
- Order: Orthoptera
- Suborder: Caelifera
- Family: Acrididae
- Tribe: Trimerotropini
- Genus: Trimerotropis
- Species: T. sparsa

Binomial name
- Trimerotropis sparsa (Thomas, 1875)

= Trimerotropis sparsa =

Species of grasshopper

Trimerotropis sparsa, known generally as the badlands grasshopper or great basin grasshopper, is a species of band-winged grasshopper in the family Acrididae. It is found in North America.
