= Conozoa rebellis =

Scientific classification
- Kingdom: Animalia
- Phylum: Arthropoda
- Clade: Pancrustacea
- Class: Insecta
- Order: Orthoptera
- Suborder: Caelifera
- Family: Acrididae
- Tribe: Trimerotropini
- Genus: Conozoa
- Species: C. rebellis

Binomial name
- Conozoa rebellis Saussure, 1888

Species of grasshopper

Conozoa rebellis, the white-lined grasshopper, is a species of band-winged grasshopper in the family Acrididae. It is found in Central America and North America.
