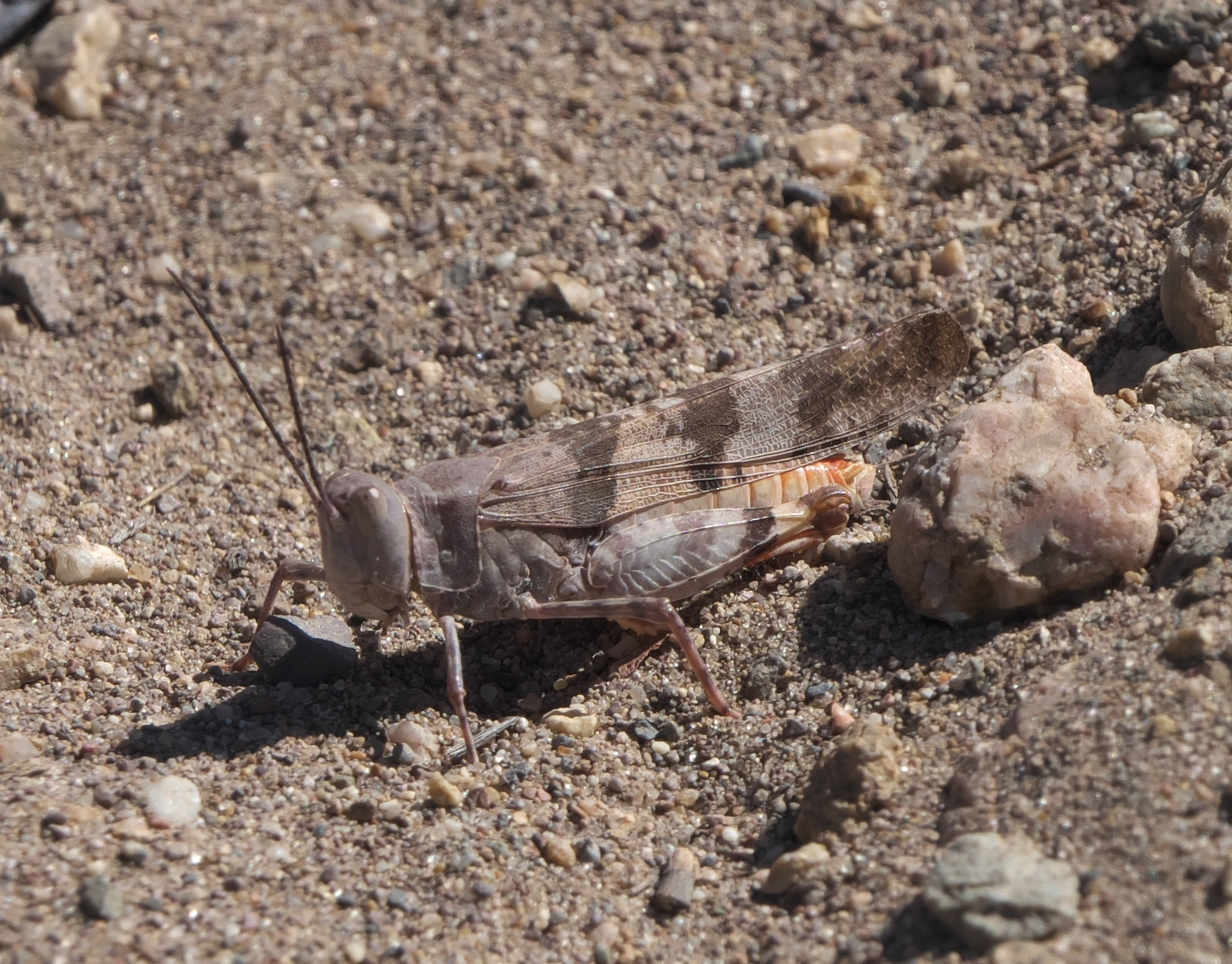
- Trimerotropis latifasciata, Colorado

Scientific classification
- Kingdom: Animalia
- Phylum: Arthropoda
- Class: Insecta
- Order: Orthoptera
- Suborder: Caelifera
- Family: Acrididae
- Tribe: Trimerotropini
- Genus: Trimerotropis
- Species: T. latifasciata

Binomial name
- Trimerotropis latifasciata Scudder, 1881

= Trimerotropis latifasciata =

Species of grasshopper

Trimerotropis latifasciata, the broad-banded grasshopper, is a species of band-winged grasshopper in the family Acrididae. It is found in Central America and North America.
