= Trimerotropis titusi =

Scientific classification
- Domain: Eukaryota
- Kingdom: Animalia
- Phylum: Arthropoda
- Class: Insecta
- Order: Orthoptera
- Suborder: Caelifera
- Family: Acrididae
- Tribe: Trimerotropini
- Genus: Trimerotropis
- Species: T. titusi

Binomial name
- Trimerotropis titusi Caudell, 1905

Species of grasshopper

Trimerotropis titusi, the Titus' grasshopper, is a species of band-winged grasshopper in the family Acrididae. It is found in North America.
