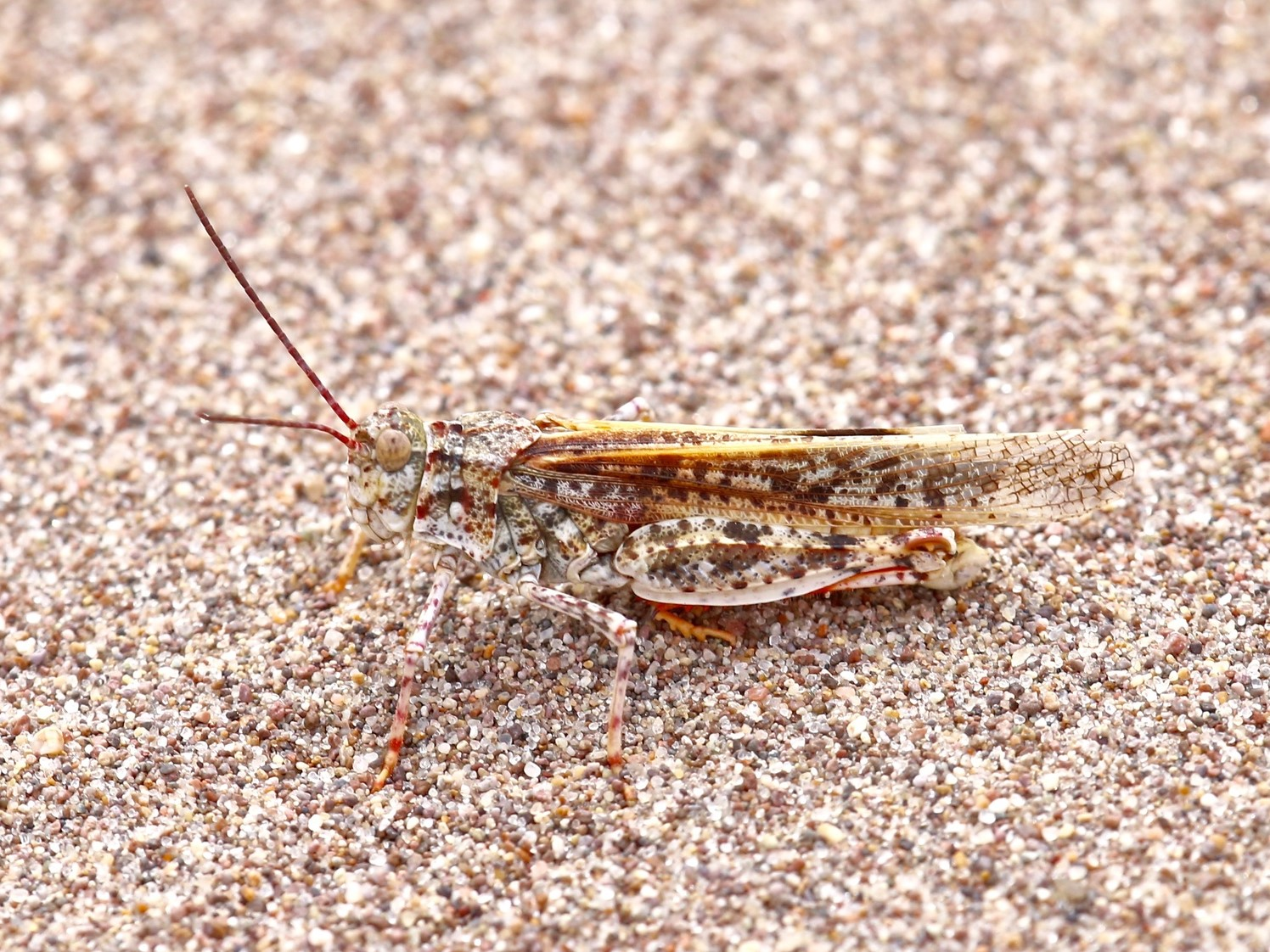

Scientific classification
- Domain: Eukaryota
- Kingdom: Animalia
- Phylum: Arthropoda
- Class: Insecta
- Order: Orthoptera
- Suborder: Caelifera
- Family: Acrididae
- Tribe: Trimerotropini
- Genus: Trimerotropis
- Species: T. agrestis

Binomial name
- Trimerotropis agrestis McNeill, 1900

= Trimerotropis agrestis =

Species of grasshopper

Trimerotropis agrestis, known generally as the toothed dune grasshopper or toothed field grasshopper, is a species of band-winged grasshopper in the family Acrididae. It is found in North America.

== Subspecies ==
These two subspecies belong to the species Trimerotropis agrestis:

- Trimerotropis agrestis agrestis
- Trimerotropis agrestis barnumi
