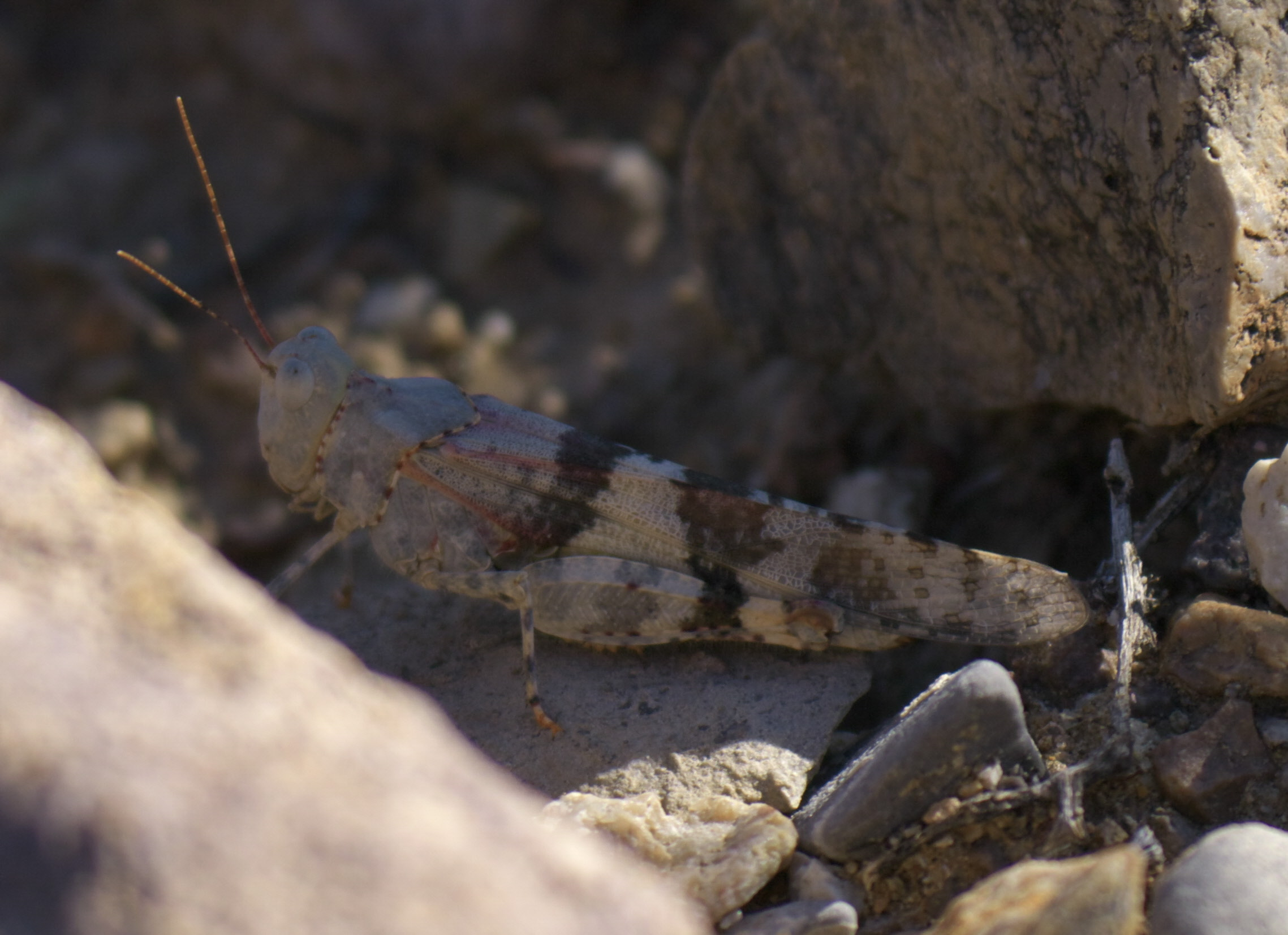

Scientific classification
- Kingdom: Animalia
- Phylum: Arthropoda
- Clade: Pancrustacea
- Class: Insecta
- Order: Orthoptera
- Suborder: Caelifera
- Family: Acrididae
- Tribe: Trimerotropini
- Genus: Trimerotropis
- Species: T. californica

Binomial name
- Trimerotropis californica Bruner, 1889

= Trimerotropis californica =

Species of grasshopper

Trimerotropis californica, known generally as the strenuous grasshopper or California band-winged grasshopper, is a species of band-winged grasshopper in the family Acrididae. It is found in Central America and North America.

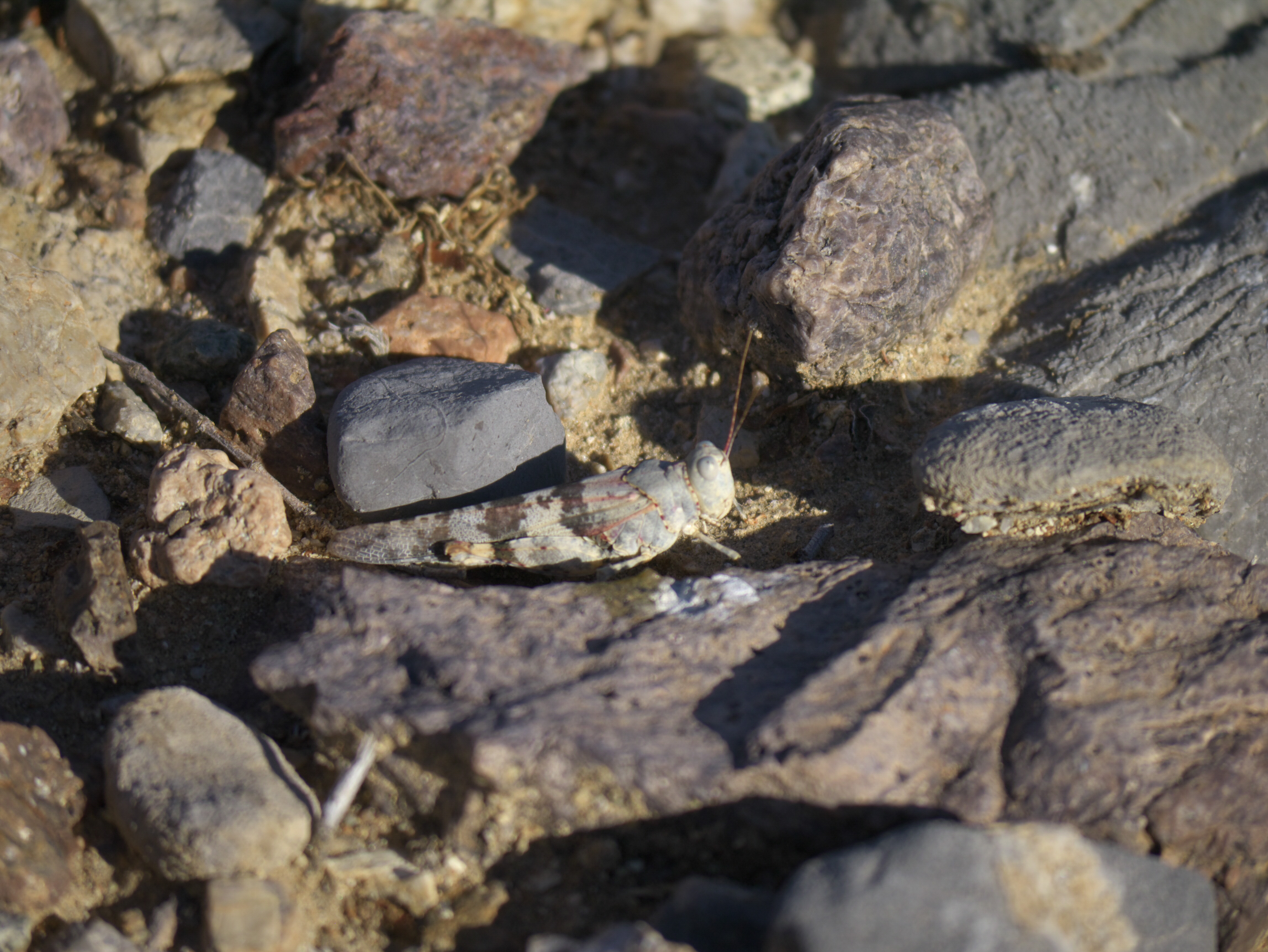
Strenuous grasshopper, Trimerotropis californica
