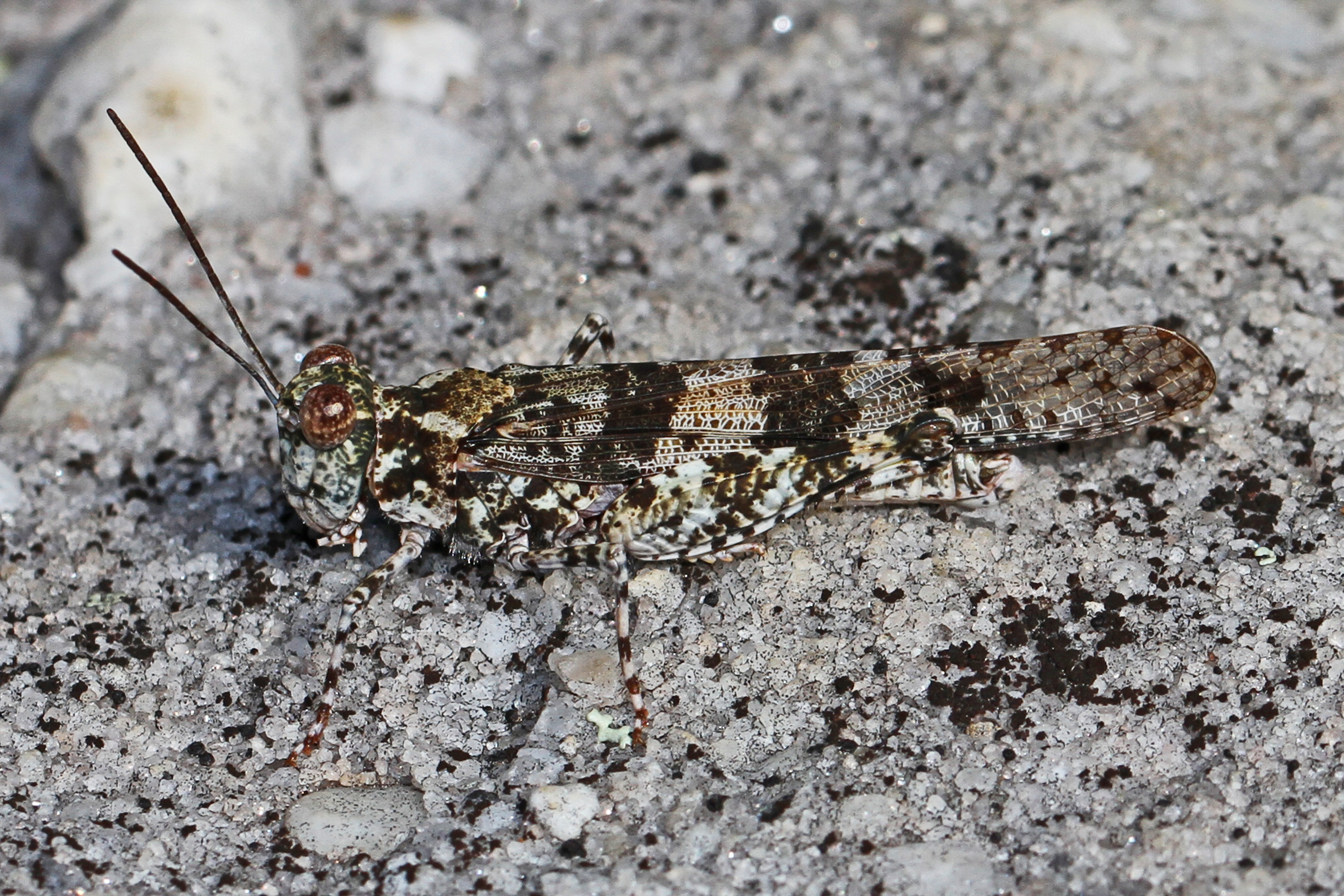

Scientific classification
- Domain: Eukaryota
- Kingdom: Animalia
- Phylum: Arthropoda
- Class: Insecta
- Order: Orthoptera
- Suborder: Caelifera
- Family: Acrididae
- Tribe: Trimerotropini
- Genus: Trimerotropis
- Species: T. saxatilis

Binomial name
- Trimerotropis saxatilis McNeill, 1900

= Trimerotropis saxatilis =

Species of grasshopper

Trimerotropis saxatilis, the lichen grasshopper, is a species of band-winged grasshopper in the family Acrididae. It is found in North America.
