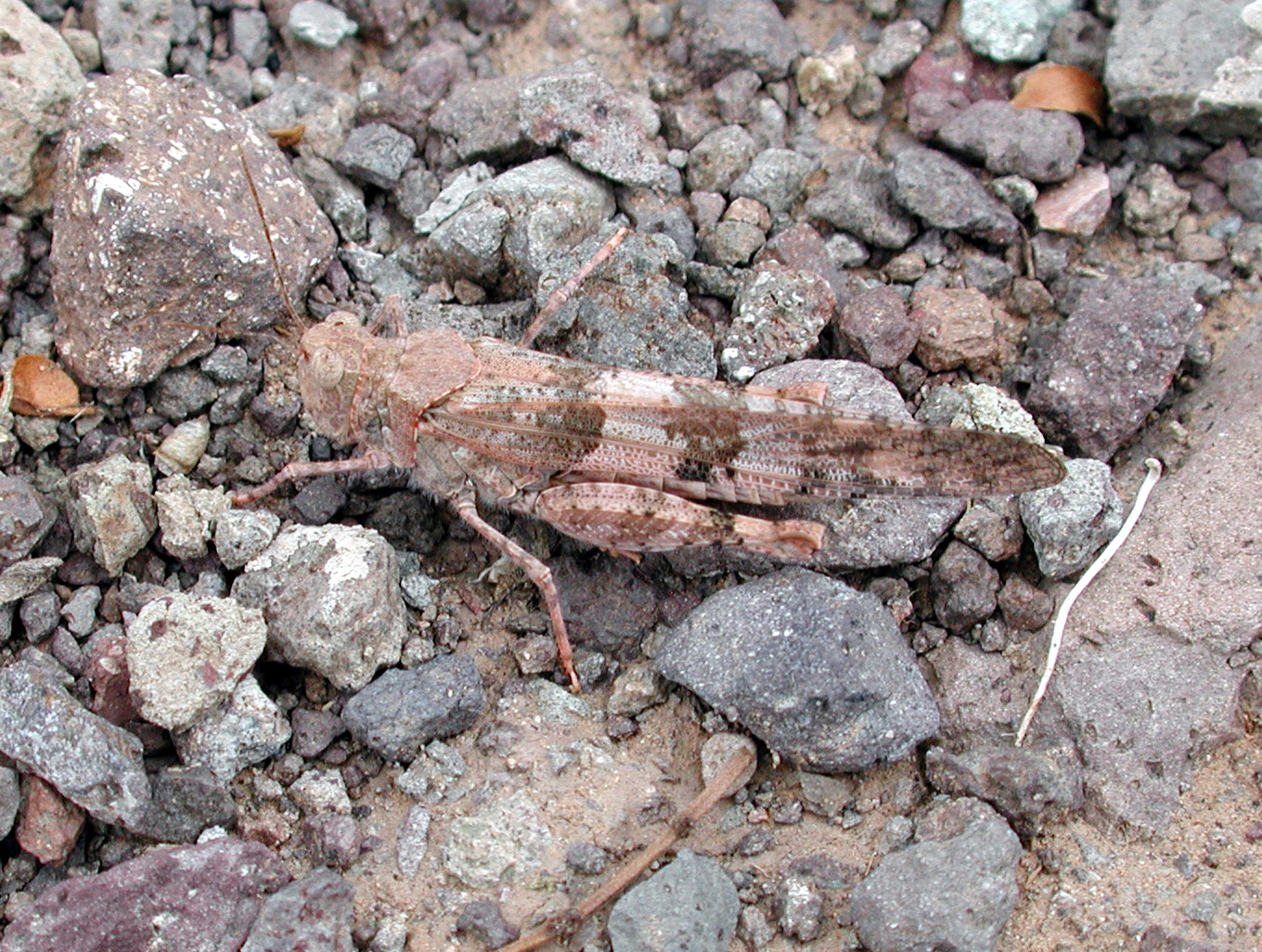

Scientific classification
- Kingdom: Animalia
- Phylum: Arthropoda
- Clade: Pancrustacea
- Class: Insecta
- Order: Orthoptera
- Suborder: Caelifera
- Family: Acrididae
- Subfamily: Oedipodinae
- Tribe: Trimerotropini
- Genus: Trimerotropis
- Species: T. pallidipennis

Binomial name
- Trimerotropis pallidipennis (Burmeister, 1838)

= Pallid-winged grasshopper =

Species of grasshopper

The pallid-winged grasshopper (Trimerotropis pallidipennis) is a common grasshopper of the family Acrididae, native to the deserts of western North America along with South America, ranging from British Columbia to Argentina. They are more active during the summer months, and their pale, mottled coloration makes them hard to see against surfaces such as the granite often found in the gravel of dry river beds. They grow to be 37 millimetres (1.5 in). The behavior of the pallid-winged grasshopper is apparently determined by temperature, with foraging occurring at temperatures of 24–32 °C (75–90 °F) and mating at 30–40 °C (86–104 °F).

Like many band-winged grasshoppers in the subfamily Oedipodinae, males perform crepitation flights, producing crackling sounds with their wings when disturbed or during courtship. Males also stridulate in courtship, rubbing the hind femur against the forewing to make a trilling sound.

Populations of the pallid-winged grasshopper occasionally irrupt to damaging numbers. Between 1952 and 1980, there were six outbreaks in Arizona, only one of which lasted more than one year.

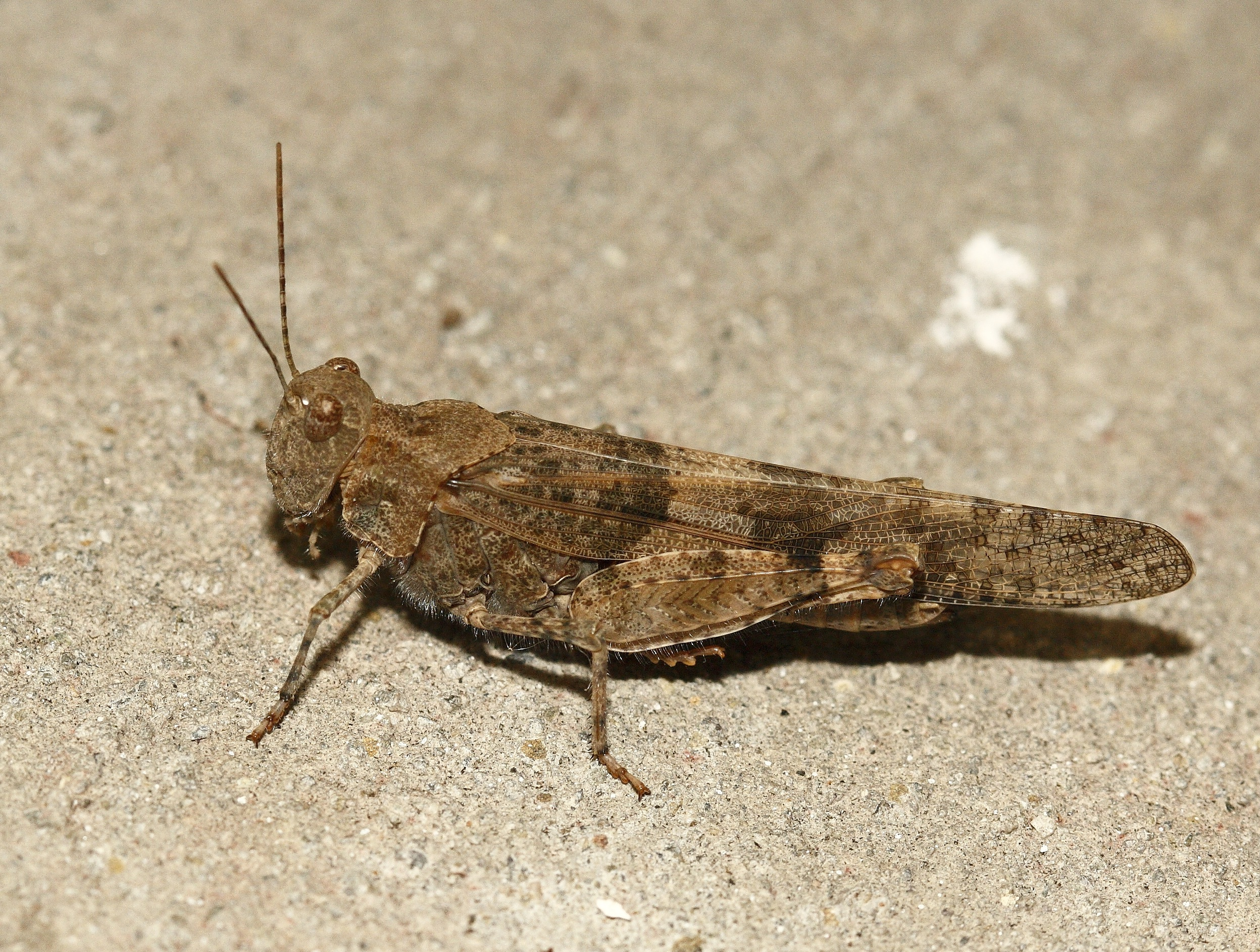
A female pallid-winged grasshopper
