= Topanga (disambiguation) =

Topanga may refer to:

== Arts, Entertainment, Media ==
- PUP (band), a Canadian band formerly known as Topanga
- Topanga (album), a 1994 album by Scottish-Australian singer Colin Hay
- "Topanga" (song), a single by American rapper Trippie Redd on the 2018 mixtape A Love Letter to You 3
- "Topanga" (voice memo), a song by American singer Noah Cyrus on her 2018 EP Good Cry
- Topanga Lawrence, a character from the television series Boy Meets World and Girl Meets World

== Places in the United States ==
- Topanga, California, an unincorporated area of Los Angeles County
- Topanga Canyon, a canyon in Southern California
- Westfield Topanga, a shopping mall in Canoga Park, California
- Topanga Village, a shopping complex in Woodland Hills, Los Angeles, California
- Topanga State Park in Los Angeles County, California
  - Topanga Ranch Motel, a former motel in the state park
- Topanga Canyon Boulevard (California State Route 27), a road running between the Pacific Coast Highway and Ronald Reagan Freeway through the Topanga Canyon

== Other uses ==
- Topanga Canyon Formation, a Miocene geologic formation in southern California, USA
- Topanga Fire, a 2005 wildfire in Southern California, USA
- Topanga grasshopper (Trimerotropis topanga)
