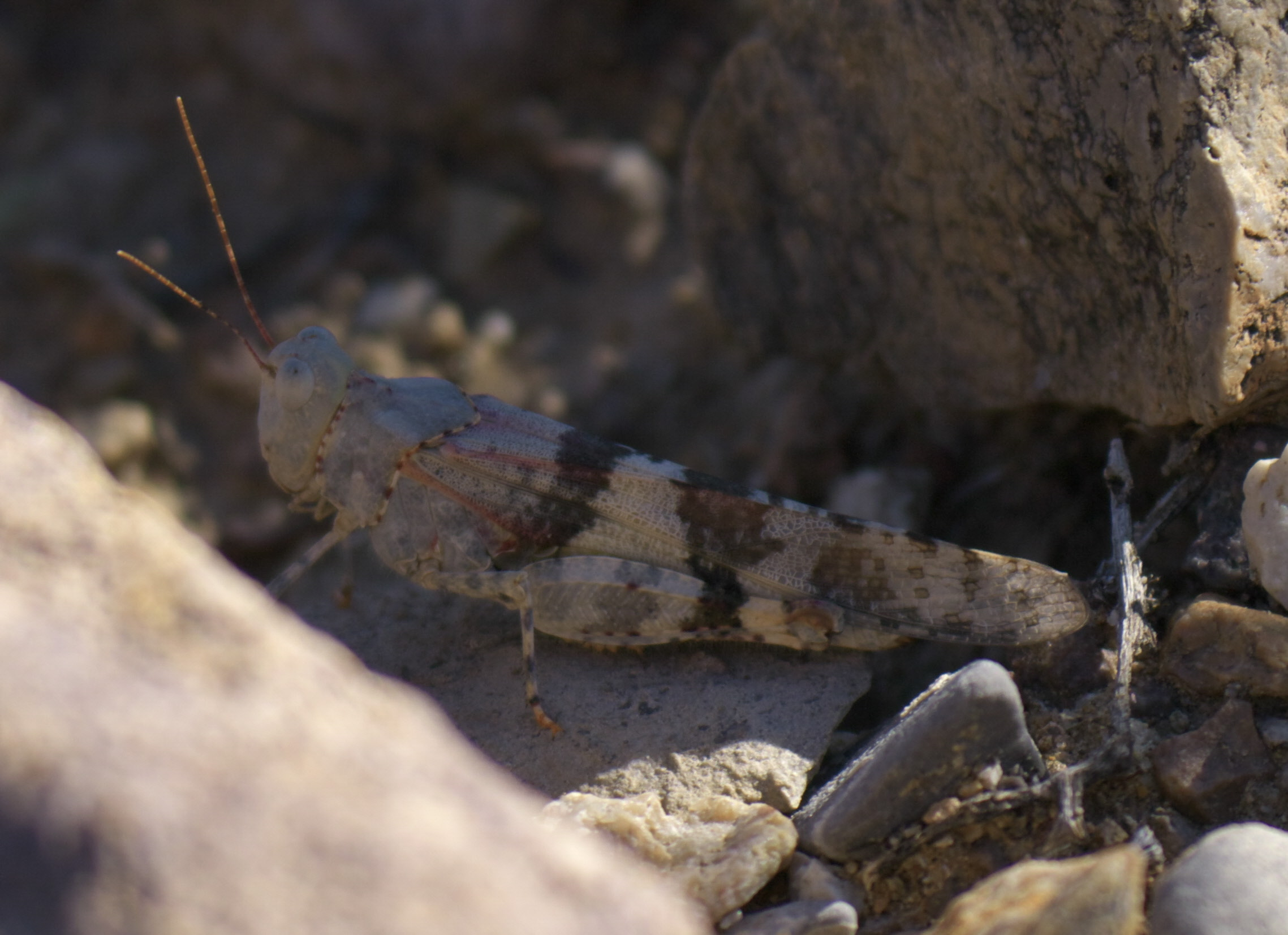
- Trimerotropis californica

Scientific classification
- Kingdom: Animalia
- Phylum: Arthropoda
- Clade: Pancrustacea
- Class: Insecta
- Order: Orthoptera
- Suborder: Caelifera
- Family: Acrididae
- Subfamily: Oedipodinae
- Tribe: Trimerotropini
- Genus: Trimerotropis; Stål, 1873

= Trimerotropis =

Genus of grasshoppers

Trimerotropis is a genus of band-winged grasshoppers in the family Acrididae. There are at least 50 described species in Trimerotropis: found in the Americas.

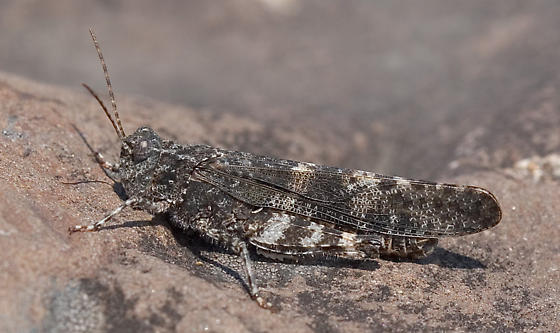
Trimerotropis verruculata

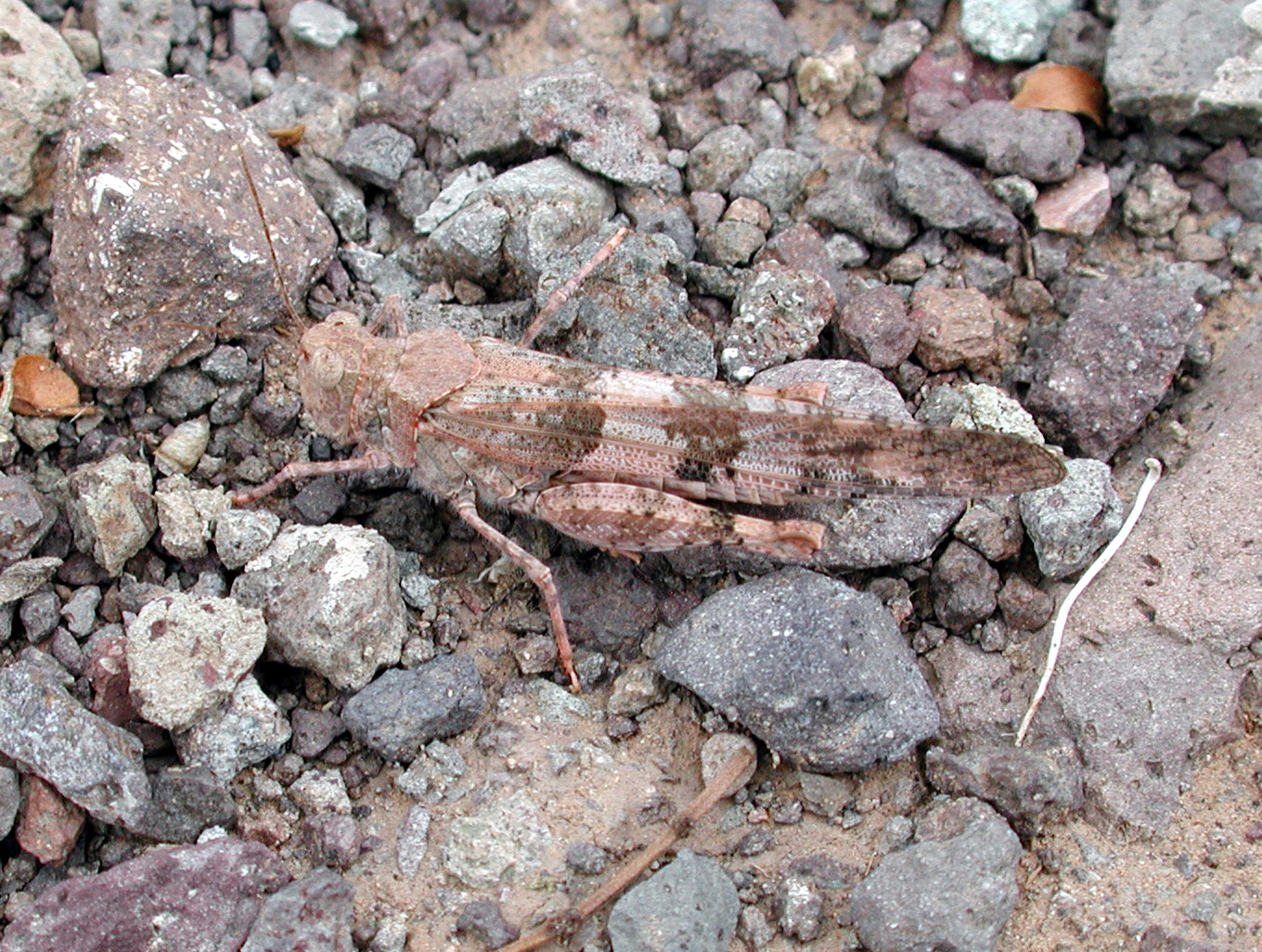
Trimerotropis pallidipennis

== Species ==
- Trimerotropis aberasturii McNary, 2014
- Trimerotropis agrestis McNeill, 1900 (toothed dune grasshopper)
- Trimerotropis albescens McNeill, 1901 (Mcneill's white grasshopper)
- Trimerotropis andeana Rehn, J.A.G., 1939
- Trimerotropis arenacea Rehn, 1910 (Rehn's dune grasshopper)
- Trimerotropis arizonensis Tinkham, 1947 (Colorado River blue-wing grasshopper)
- Trimerotropis atacamensis (Philippi, 1860)
- Trimerotropis barnumi Tinkham, 1960
- Trimerotropis bernardi Rentz & Weissman, 1984 (forest falls grasshopper)
- Trimerotropis bifasciata Bruner, 1889 (two-banded grasshopper)
- Trimerotropis californica Bruner, 1889 (strenuous grasshopper)
- Trimerotropis chloris (Philippi, 1863)
- Trimerotropis cincta (Thomas, 1870) (masked grasshopper)
- Trimerotropis cyaneipennis Bruner, 1889 (blue-winged grasshopper)
- Trimerotropis diversellus Hebard, 1928 (geyser grasshopper)
- Trimerotropis flavipennis (Philippi, 1863)
- Trimerotropis fontana Thomas, 1876 (fontana grasshopper)
- Trimerotropis fratercula McNeill, 1901 (pine bluffs grasshopper)
- Trimerotropis gracilis (Thomas, 1872) (Thomas' slender grasshopper)
- Trimerotropis helferi (Strohecker, 1960) (Helfer's dune grasshopper)
- Trimerotropis huasteca Saussure, 1888
- Trimerotropis huroniana E. M. Walker, 1902 (lake Huron locust)
- Trimerotropis inconspicua Bruner, 1904 (inconspicuous grasshopper)
- Trimerotropis infantilis Rentz & Weissman, 1984 (zayante sandhills grasshopper)
- Trimerotropis inyo Rentz & Weissman, 1984 (inyo grasshopper)
- Trimerotropis irrorata (Philippi, 1863)
- Trimerotropis koebelei (Bruner, 1889) (Koebele's grasshopper)
- Trimerotropis latifasciata Scudder, 1881 (broad-banded grasshopper)
- Trimerotropis lauta Scudder, S.H., 1876
- Trimerotropis leucophaea Rentz & Weissman, 1984 (inyo blue-wing grasshopper)
- Trimerotropis maritima (Harris, 1841) (seaside grasshopper)
- Trimerotropis melanoptera McNeill, 1901 (black-winged grasshopper)
- Trimerotropis modesta Bruner, 1889 (modest grasshopper)
- Trimerotropis monticola Saussure, 1884
- Trimerotropis occidentalis (Bruner, 1889) (occidental grasshopper)
- Trimerotropis occidentiloides Rentz & Weissman, 1981
- Trimerotropis occulens Otte, 1984 (lompoc grasshopper)
- Trimerotropis ochraceipennis (Blanchard, E., 1851)
- Trimerotropis pacifica Bruner, 1889
- Trimerotropis pallidipennis (Burmeister, 1838) (pallid-winged grasshopper)
- Trimerotropis pallidipennis-b
- Trimerotropis pallidipennis-c
- Trimerotropis pistrinaria Saussure, 1884 (barren land grasshopper)
- Trimerotropis pseudofasciata Scudder, 1876 (caerulean-winged grasshopper)
- Trimerotropis rufipennis Liebermann, 1943
- Trimerotropis salina McNeill, 1901 (alkali grasshopper)
- Trimerotropis santabarbara Rentz & Weissman, 1981
- Trimerotropis saxatilis McNeill, 1900 (lichen grasshopper)
- Trimerotropis schaefferi Caudell, 1904 (gulf dune grasshopper)
- Trimerotropis sparsa (Thomas, 1875) (badlands grasshopper)
- Trimerotropis thalassica Bruner, 1889 (thalassica grasshopper)
- Trimerotropis titusi Caudell, 1905 (Titus' grasshopper)
- Trimerotropis tolteca (Saussure, 1861)
- Trimerotropis topanga Rentz & Weissman, 1981 (topanga grasshopper)
- Trimerotropis verruculata (Kirby, 1837) (crackling forest grasshopper)
- Trimerotropis whitei Rentz & Weissman, 1984 (White's dune grasshopper)
