= Trimerotropis santabarbara =

Scientific classification
- Domain: Eukaryota
- Kingdom: Animalia
- Phylum: Arthropoda
- Class: Insecta
- Order: Orthoptera
- Suborder: Caelifera
- Family: Acrididae
- Genus: Trimerotropis
- Species: T. santabarbara

Binomial name
- Trimerotropis santabarbara Rentz & Weissman, 1981

Species of grasshopper

Trimerotropis santabarbara is a species of band-winged grasshopper in the family Acrididae. It is found in North America.
