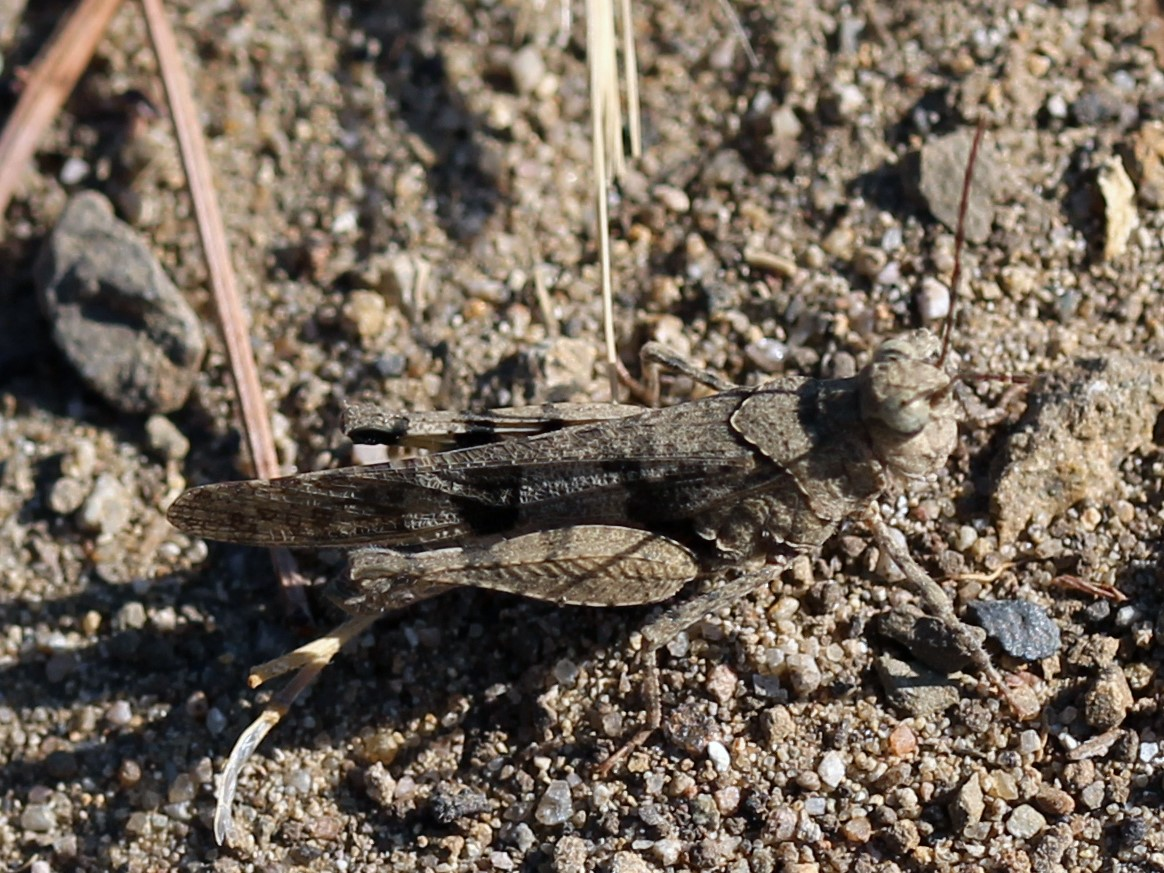

Conservation status
- Endangered (IUCN 2.3)

Scientific classification
- Kingdom: Animalia
- Phylum: Arthropoda
- Class: Insecta
- Order: Orthoptera
- Suborder: Caelifera
- Family: Acrididae
- Genus: Trimerotropis
- Species: T. occidentiloides

Binomial name
- Trimerotropis occidentiloides Rentz & Weissman, 1981

= Trimerotropis occidentiloides =

Species of grasshopper

Trimerotropis occidentiloides is a species of band-winged grasshopper in the family Acrididae. It is found in North America.
