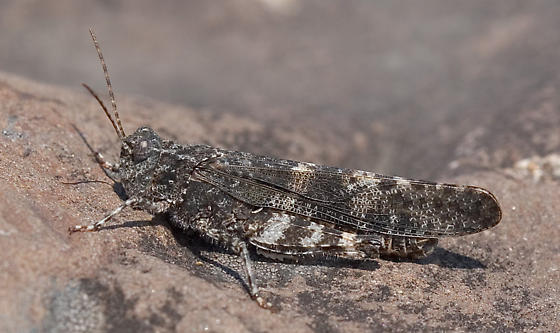

Scientific classification
- Kingdom: Animalia
- Phylum: Arthropoda
- Class: Insecta
- Order: Orthoptera
- Suborder: Caelifera
- Family: Acrididae
- Genus: Trimerotropis
- Species: T. verruculata

Binomial name
- Trimerotropis verruculata (Kirby, 1837)

= Trimerotropis verruculata =

Species of grasshopper

Trimerotropis verruculata, known generally as the crackling forest grasshopper or cracker grasshopper, is a species of band-winged grasshopper in the family Acrididae. It is found in North America. Its English common name comes from the distinctive cracking sound it makes as it flies. Its specific scientific name is derived from the Latin word for wart or excrescence and refers to its mottled rough appearance which probably provides camouflage on the exposed gravel, rock and ledge where it is often found.

== Subspecies ==
These two subspecies belong to the species Trimerotropis verruculata:

- Trimerotropis verruculata suffusa Scudder, 1876 (crackling forest grasshopper)
- Trimerotropis verruculata verruculata (Kirby, 1837) (crackling locust)
