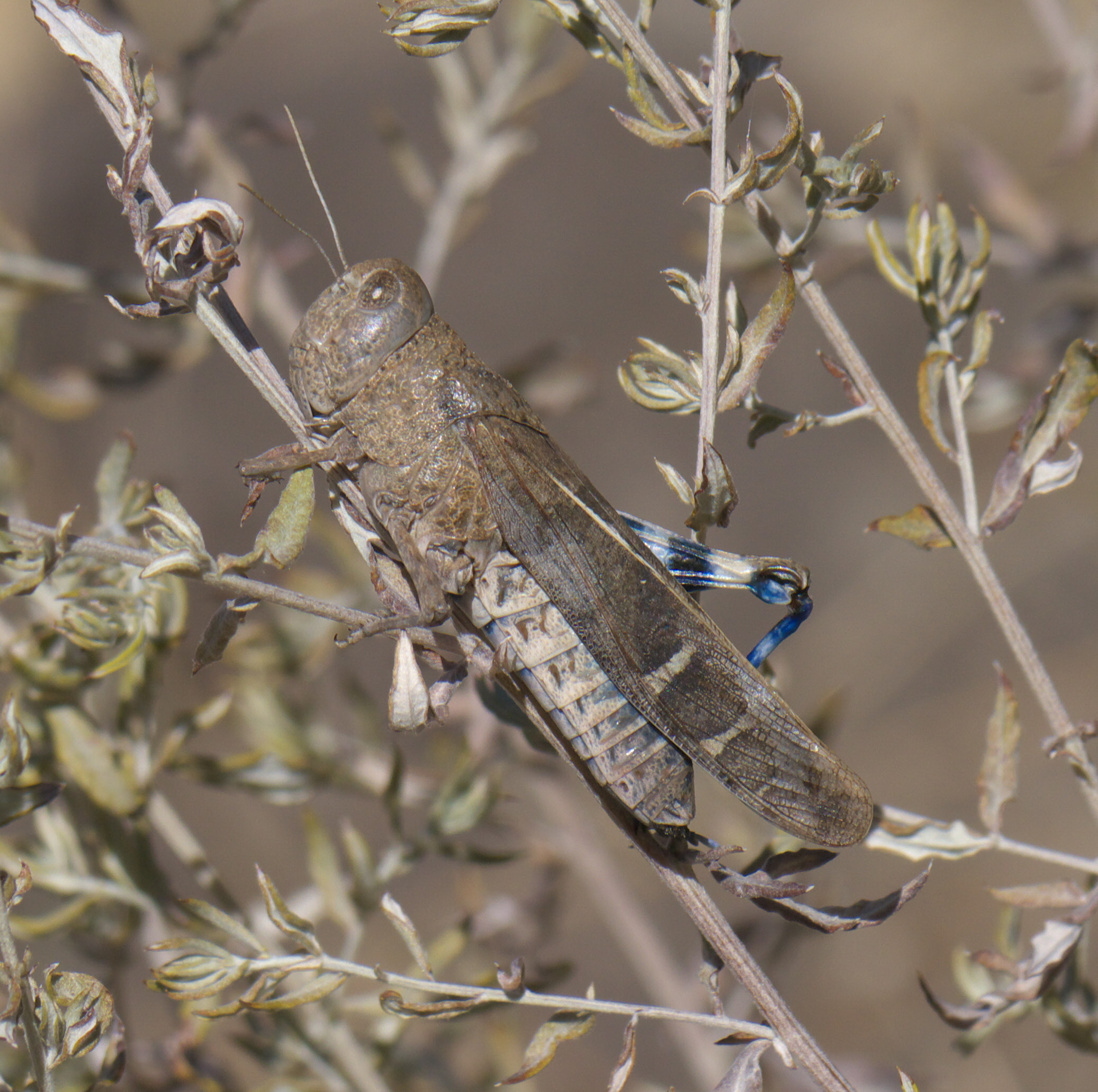
- Leprus intermedius

Scientific classification
- Domain: Eukaryota
- Kingdom: Animalia
- Phylum: Arthropoda
- Class: Insecta
- Order: Orthoptera
- Suborder: Caelifera
- Family: Acrididae
- Subfamily: Oedipodinae
- Tribe: Hippiscini
- Genus: Leprus; Saussure, 1861

= Leprus =

Blue-winged grasshoppers

Genus of grasshoppers

Leprus is a genus of band-winged grasshoppers in the family Acrididae. There are at least three described species in Leprus.

== Species ==
These three species belong to the genus Leprus:

- Leprus elephas (Saussure, 1861)
- Leprus intermedius Saussure, 1884 — Saussure's blue-winged grasshopper
- Leprus wheelerii (Thomas, C., 1875) — Wheeler's blue-winged grasshopper
