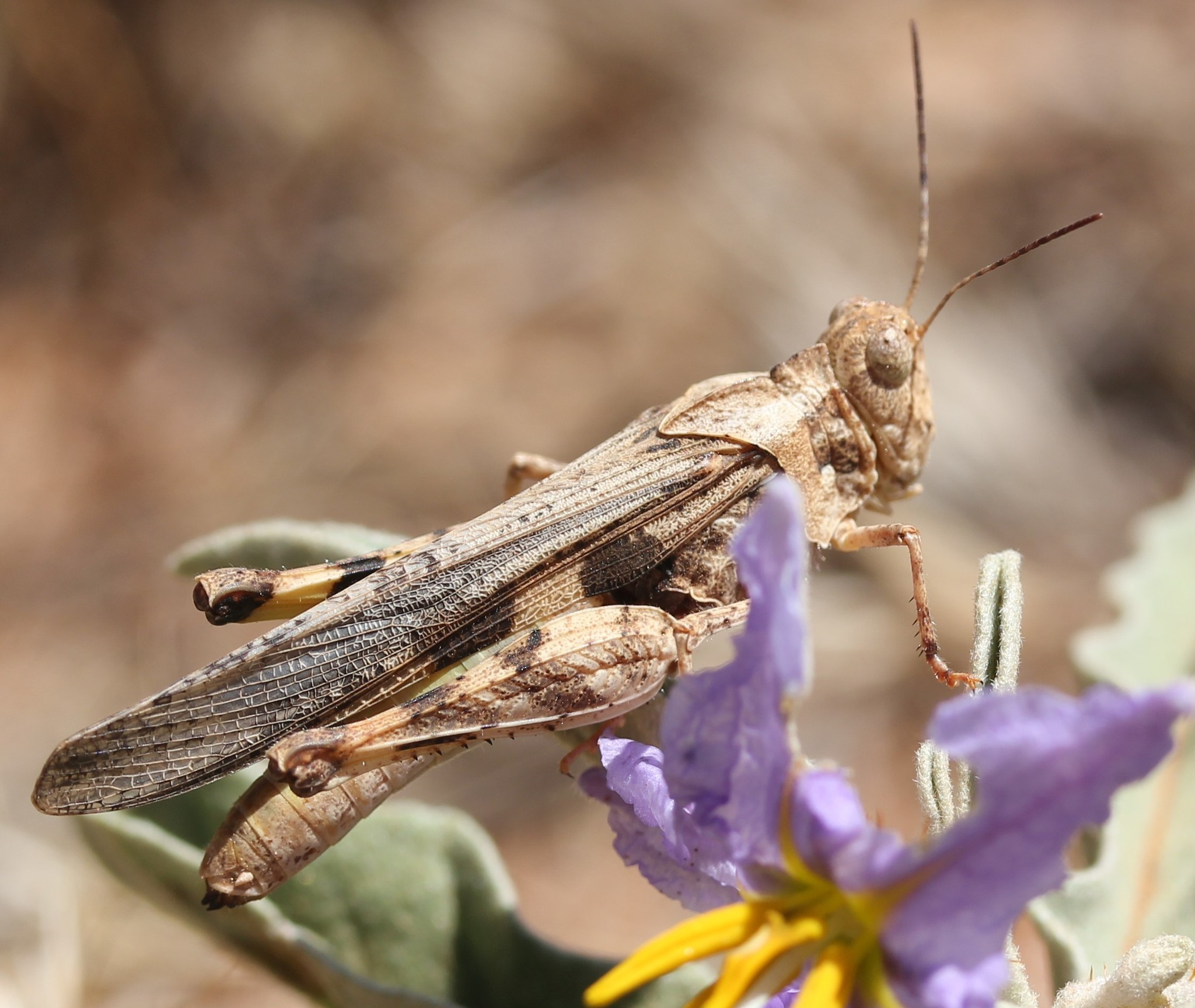

Scientific classification
- Kingdom: Animalia
- Phylum: Arthropoda
- Clade: Pancrustacea
- Class: Insecta
- Order: Orthoptera
- Suborder: Caelifera
- Family: Acrididae
- Genus: Conozoa
- Species: C. carinata

Binomial name
- Conozoa carinata Rehn, 1907

= Conozoa carinata =

Species of grasshopper

Conozoa carinata, the ridged grasshopper, is a species of band-winged grasshopper in the family Acrididae. It is found in Central America and North America.
