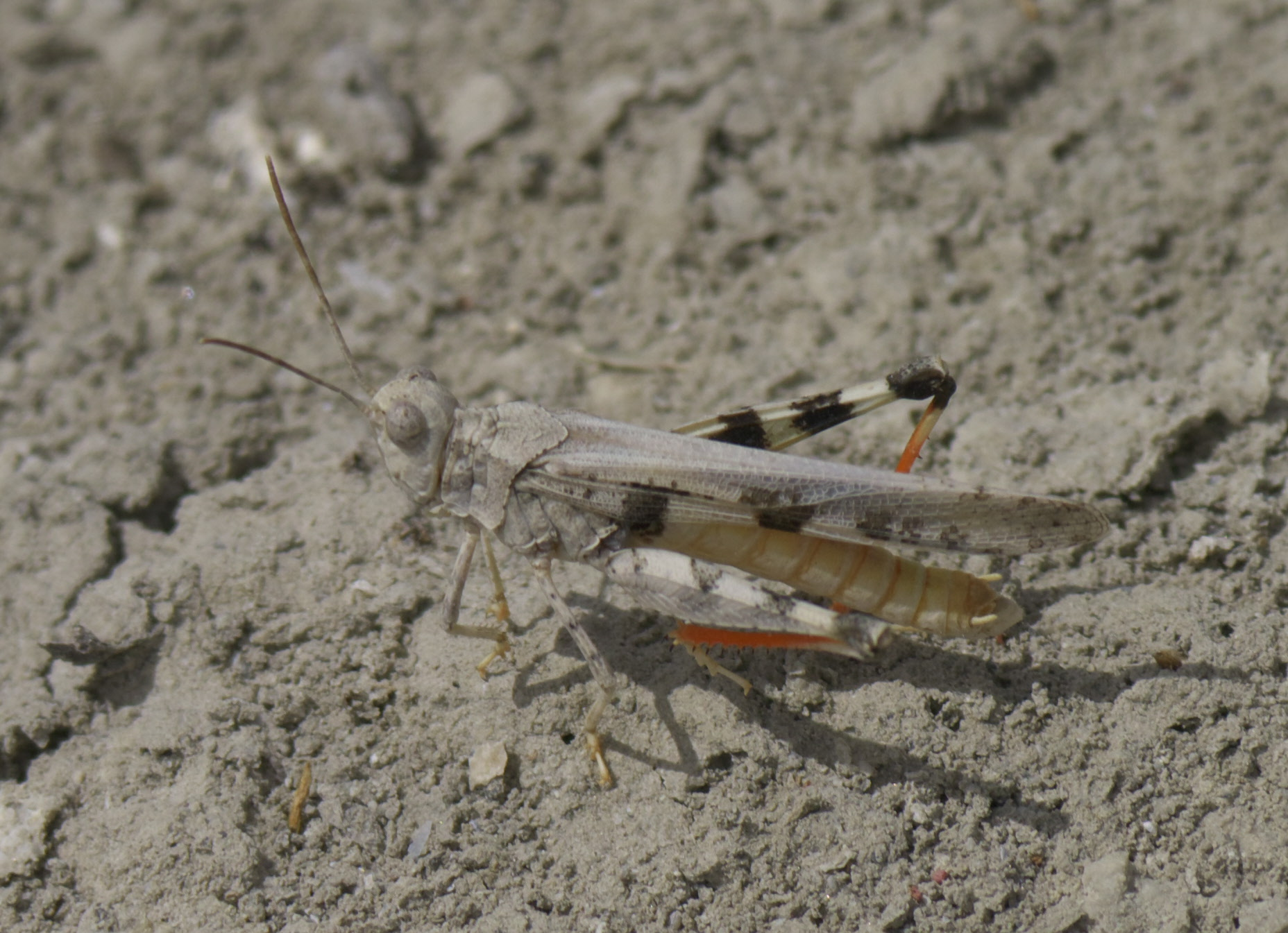
- Conozoa sulcifrons

Scientific classification
- Kingdom: Animalia
- Phylum: Arthropoda
- Clade: Pancrustacea
- Class: Insecta
- Order: Orthoptera
- Suborder: Caelifera
- Family: Acrididae
- Subfamily: Oedipodinae
- Tribe: Trimerotropini
- Genus: Conozoa; Saussure, 1884

Type species
- Conozoa behrensi Saussure, 1884; a junior synonym of C. sulcifrons (Scudder, 1876)

Synonyms
- Agonozoa McNeill, 1900

= Conozoa =

Genus of grasshoppers

Conozoa is a genus of grasshoppers in the family Acrididae.

== Species ==
- Conozoa carinata Rehn, 1907
- Conozoa clementina (Rentz & Weissman, 1981)
- Conozoa constricta (Henderson, 1924)
- Conozoa hyalina (McNeill, 1901) — extinct
- Conozoa nicola (Rentz & Weissman, 1981)
- Conozoa rebellis Saussure, 1888
- Conozoa sulcifrons (Scudder, 1876)
- Conozoa texana Bruner, 1889
