= Trimerotropis topanga =

Scientific classification
- Domain: Eukaryota
- Kingdom: Animalia
- Phylum: Arthropoda
- Class: Insecta
- Order: Orthoptera
- Suborder: Caelifera
- Family: Acrididae
- Tribe: Trimerotropini
- Genus: Trimerotropis
- Species: T. topanga

Binomial name
- Trimerotropis topanga Rentz & Weissman, 1981

Species of grasshopper

Trimerotropis topanga, the topanga grasshopper, is a species of band-winged grasshopper in the family Acrididae. It is found in Central America and North America.
