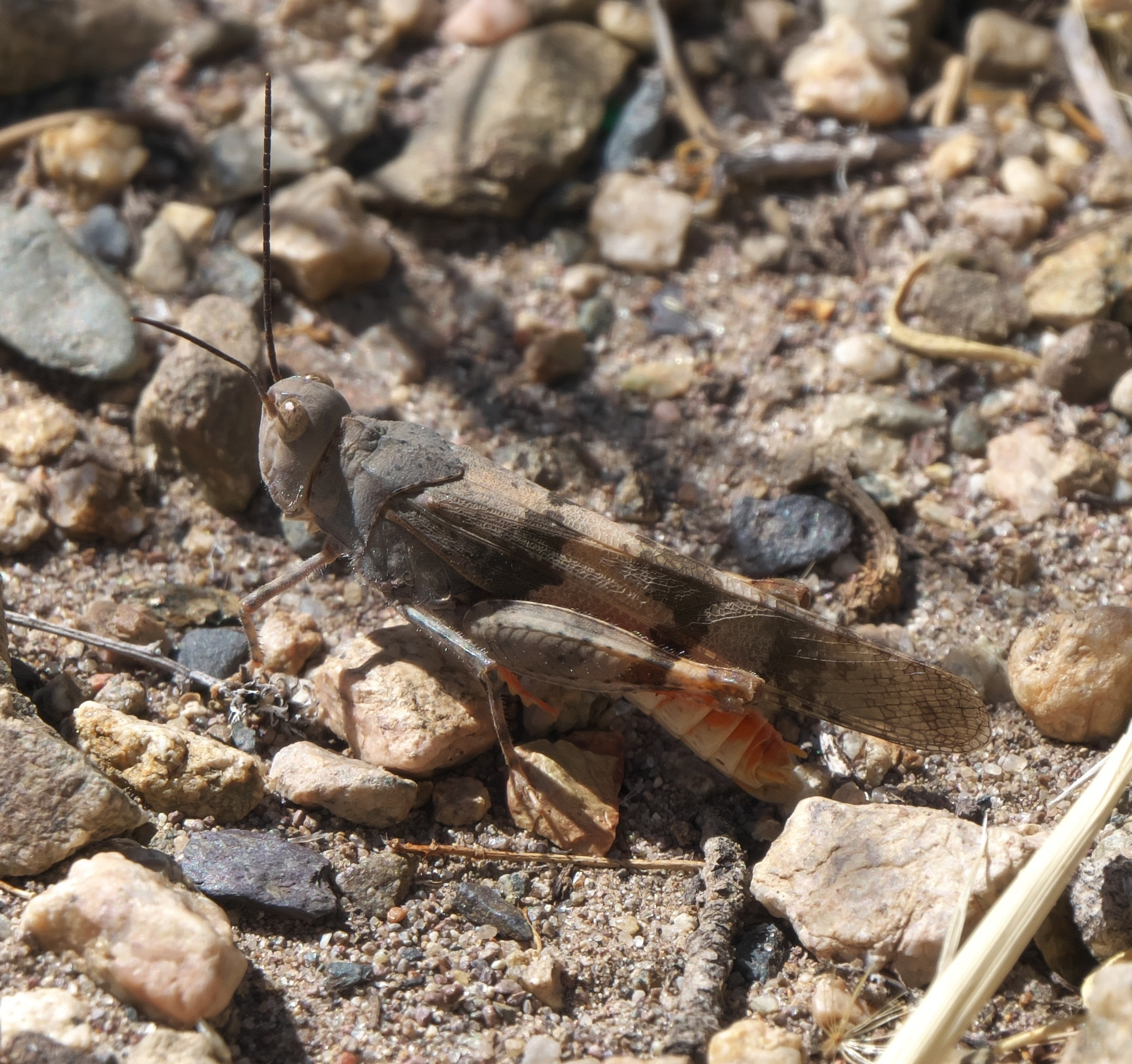
- Trimerotropis melanoptera, Colorado

Scientific classification
- Domain: Eukaryota
- Kingdom: Animalia
- Phylum: Arthropoda
- Class: Insecta
- Order: Orthoptera
- Suborder: Caelifera
- Family: Acrididae
- Genus: Trimerotropis
- Species: T. melanoptera

Binomial name
- Trimerotropis melanoptera McNeill, 1901

= Trimerotropis melanoptera =

Species of grasshopper

Trimerotropis melanoptera, the black-winged grasshopper, is a species of band-winged grasshopper in the family Acrididae. It is found in Central America and North America.
