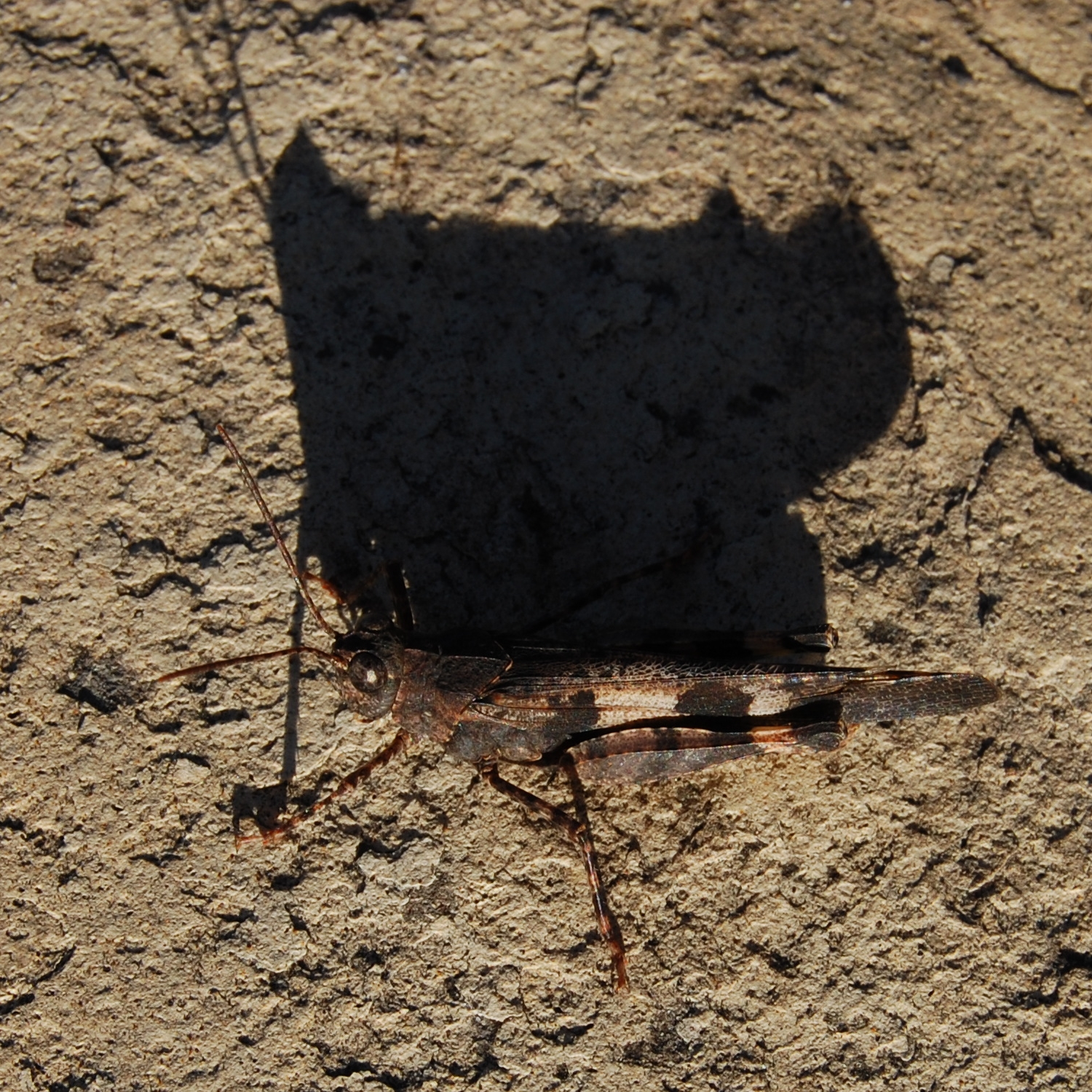

Scientific classification
- Domain: Eukaryota
- Kingdom: Animalia
- Phylum: Arthropoda
- Class: Insecta
- Order: Orthoptera
- Suborder: Caelifera
- Family: Acrididae
- Genus: Trimerotropis
- Species: T. fontana

Binomial name
- Trimerotropis fontana Thomas, C., 1876

= Trimerotropis fontana =

Species of grasshopper

Trimerotropis fontana is a grasshopper in the subfamily Oedipodinae ("band-winged grasshoppers"), in the family Acrididae ("short-horned grasshoppers"). A common name for Trimerotropis fontana is "Fontana grasshopper". Trimerotropis fontana is found in North America.
