= Conozoa nicola =

Scientific classification
- Kingdom: Animalia
- Phylum: Arthropoda
- Clade: Pancrustacea
- Class: Insecta
- Order: Orthoptera
- Suborder: Caelifera
- Family: Acrididae
- Genus: Conozoa
- Species: C. nicola

Binomial name
- Conozoa nicola (Rentz & Weissman, 1981)

Species of grasshopper

Conozoa nicola, the San Nicolas grasshopper, is a species of band-winged grasshopper in the family Acrididae. It is found in North America.
