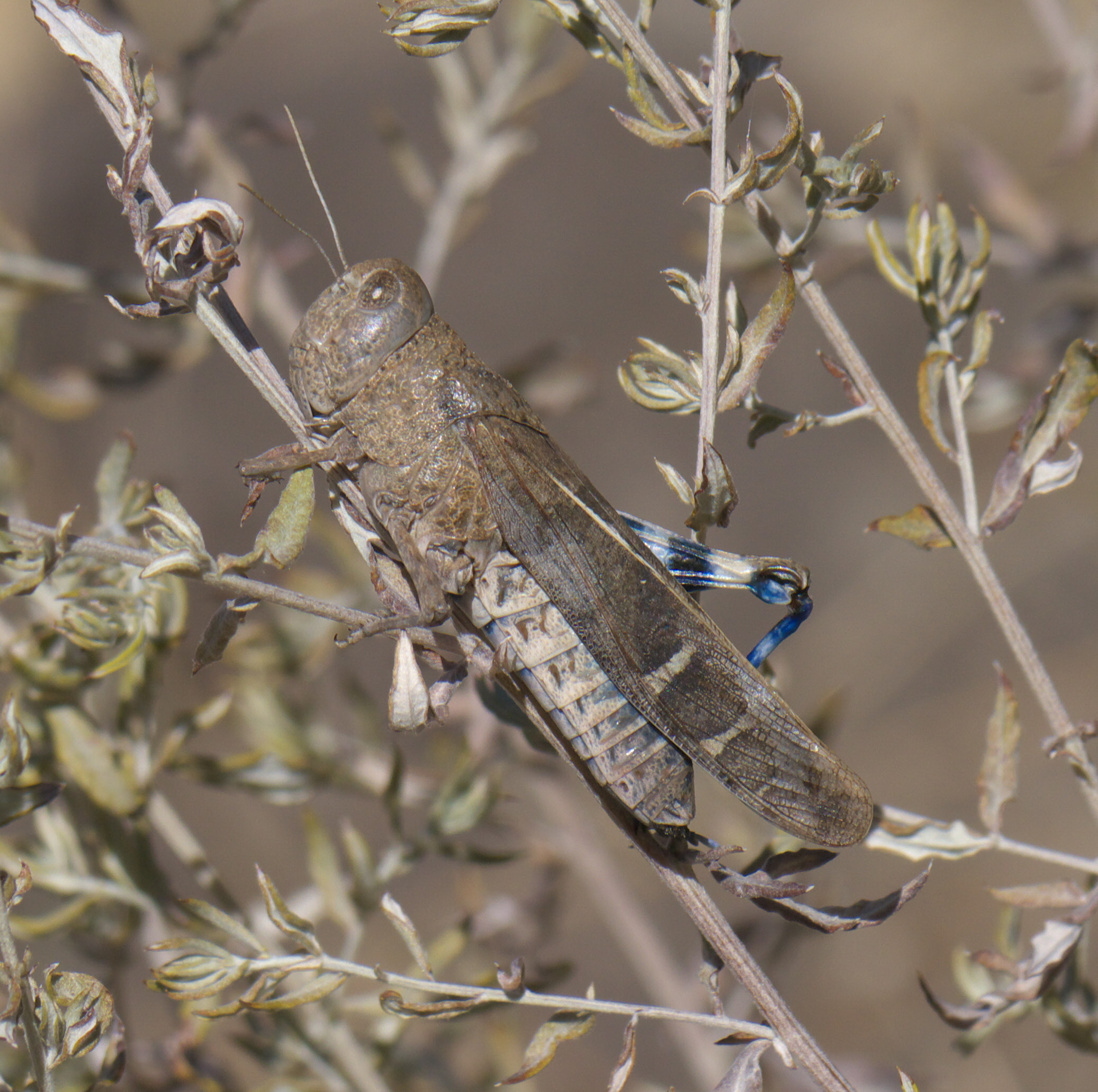

Scientific classification
- Domain: Eukaryota
- Kingdom: Animalia
- Phylum: Arthropoda
- Class: Insecta
- Order: Orthoptera
- Suborder: Caelifera
- Family: Acrididae
- Tribe: Hippiscini
- Genus: Leprus
- Species: L. intermedius

Binomial name
- Leprus intermedius Saussure, 1884

= Leprus intermedius =

Species of grasshopper

Leprus intermedius, or Saussure's blue-winged grasshopper, is a species of band-winged grasshopper in the family Acrididae. It is found in Central America and North America.
