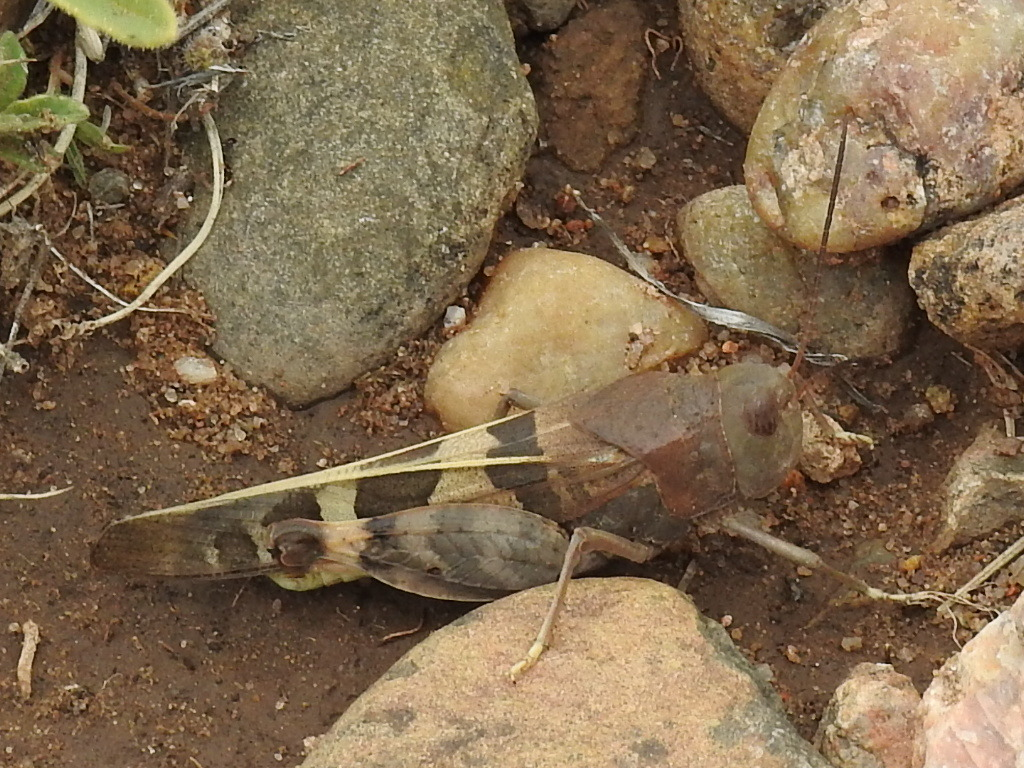
- L. wheelerii in New Mexico, USA

Scientific classification
- Domain: Eukaryota
- Kingdom: Animalia
- Phylum: Arthropoda
- Class: Insecta
- Order: Orthoptera
- Suborder: Caelifera
- Family: Acrididae
- Subfamily: Oedipodinae
- Tribe: Hippiscini
- Genus: Leprus
- Species: L. wheelerii

Binomial name
- Leprus wheelerii (Thomas, C., 1875)

= Leprus wheelerii =

Wheeler's blue-winged grasshopper

Species of band-winged grasshopper

Leprus wheelerii, or Wheeler's blue-winged grasshopper, is a species of band-winged grasshopper in the family Acrididae. It is found in the southwestern United States and Mexico.
