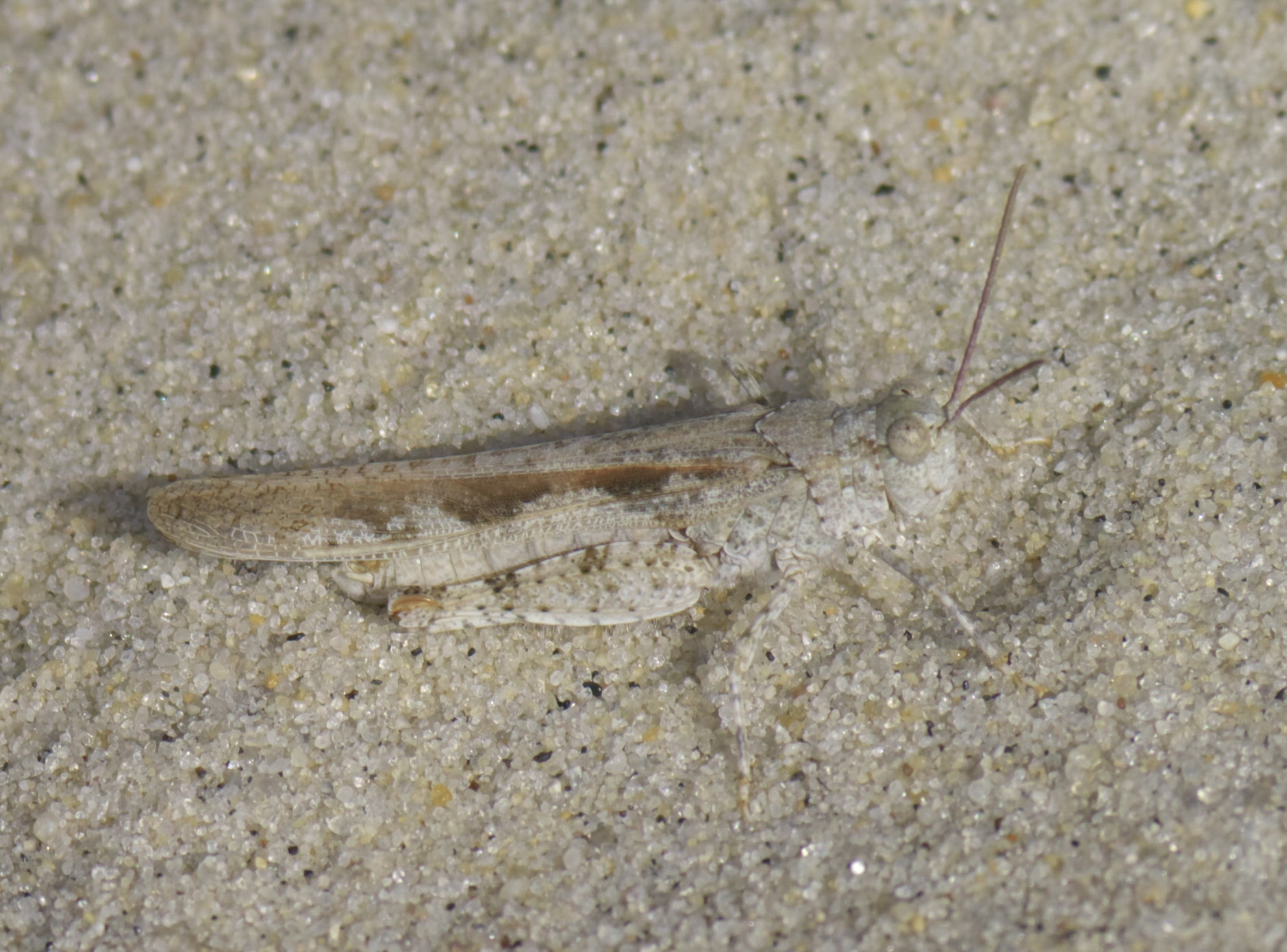

Scientific classification
- Domain: Eukaryota
- Kingdom: Animalia
- Phylum: Arthropoda
- Class: Insecta
- Order: Orthoptera
- Suborder: Caelifera
- Family: Acrididae
- Genus: Trimerotropis
- Species: T. maritima

Binomial name
- Trimerotropis maritima (Harris, 1841)

= Trimerotropis maritima =

Species of grasshopper

Trimerotropis maritima, known generally as the seaside grasshopper or seaside locust, is a species of band-winged grasshopper in the family Acrididae. It is found in Central America, North America, and the Caribbean.

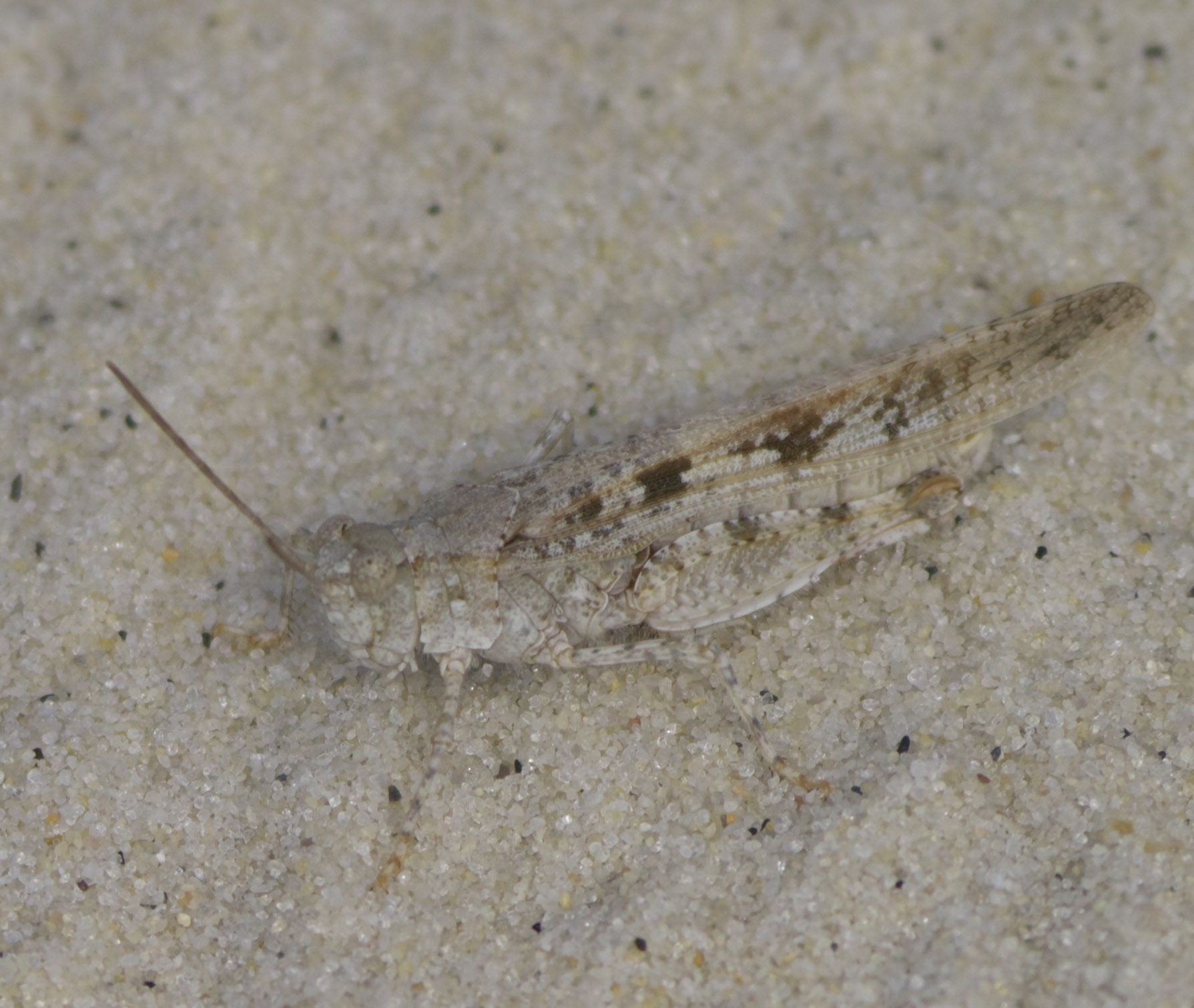
Seaside grasshopper, Trimerotropis maritima
