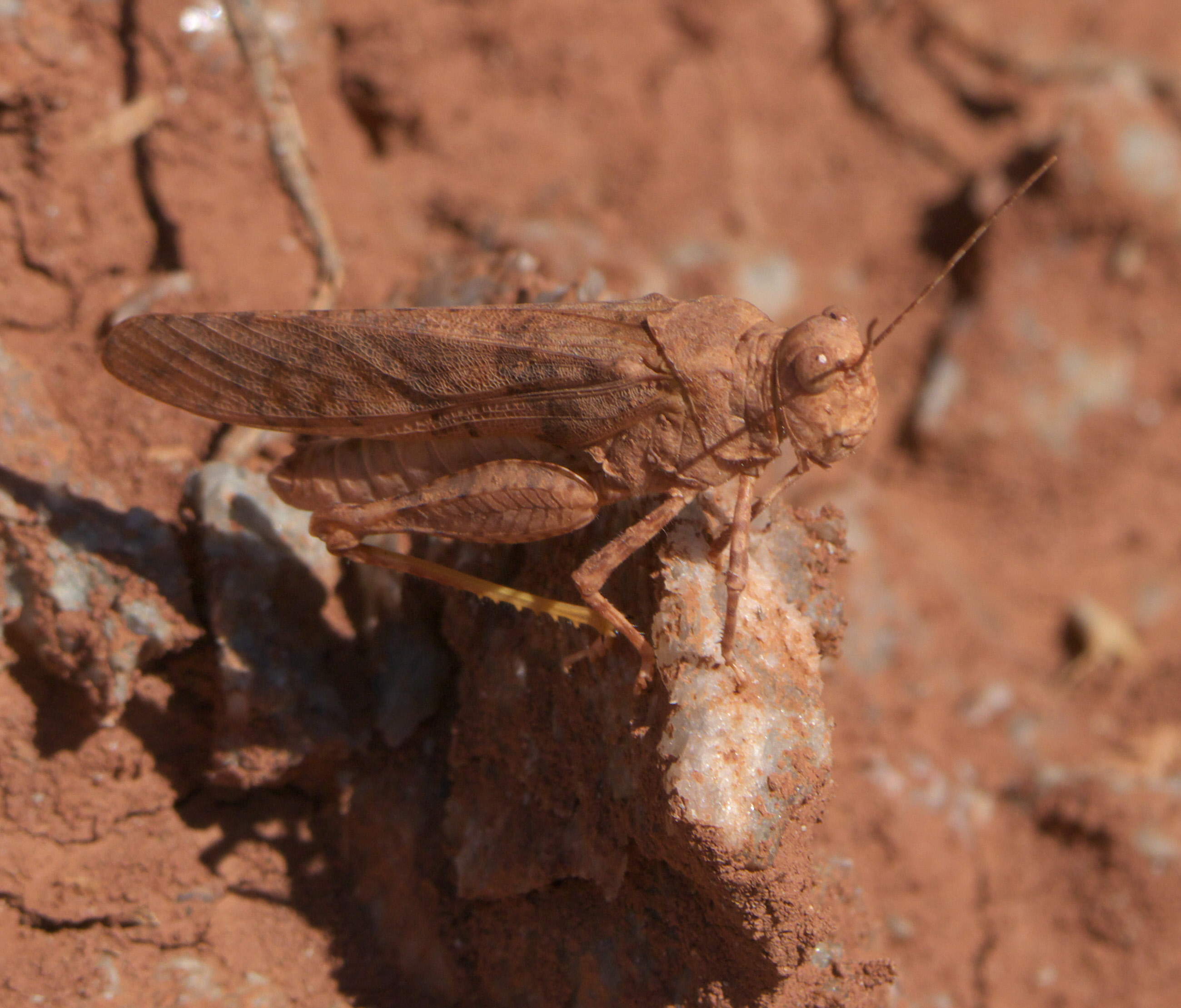
- Circotettix rabula

Scientific classification
- Kingdom: Animalia
- Phylum: Arthropoda
- Clade: Pancrustacea
- Class: Insecta
- Order: Orthoptera
- Suborder: Caelifera
- Family: Acrididae
- Subfamily: Oedipodinae
- Tribe: Trimerotropini; Blatchley, 1920

= Trimerotropini =

Tribe of grasshoppers

Trimerotropini is a tribe of band-winged grasshoppers in the family Acrididae. There are at least 70 described species in Trimerotropini: found in the western Americas.

== Genera ==
These genera belong to the tribe Trimerotropini:

- Circotettix Scudder, 1876
- Conozoa Saussure, 1884
- Dissosteira Scudder, 1876
- Spharagemon Scudder, 1875
- Trimerotropis Stål, 1873
