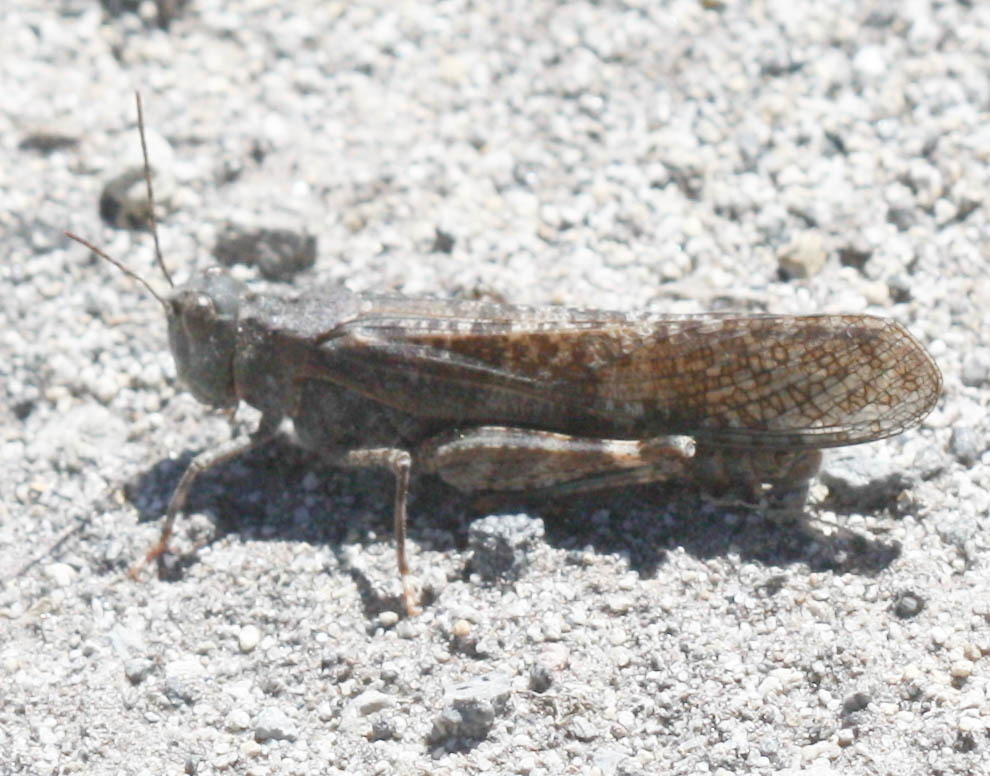

Scientific classification
- Kingdom: Animalia
- Phylum: Arthropoda
- Clade: Pancrustacea
- Class: Insecta
- Order: Orthoptera
- Suborder: Caelifera
- Family: Acrididae
- Tribe: Trimerotropini
- Genus: Circotettix
- Species: C. undulatus

Binomial name
- Circotettix undulatus (Thomas, 1872)

= Circotettix undulatus =

Species of grasshopper

Circotettix undulatus, commonly known as the undulant-winged grasshopper or great basin crackler, is a species of band-winged grasshopper in the family Acrididae. It is found in North America.
