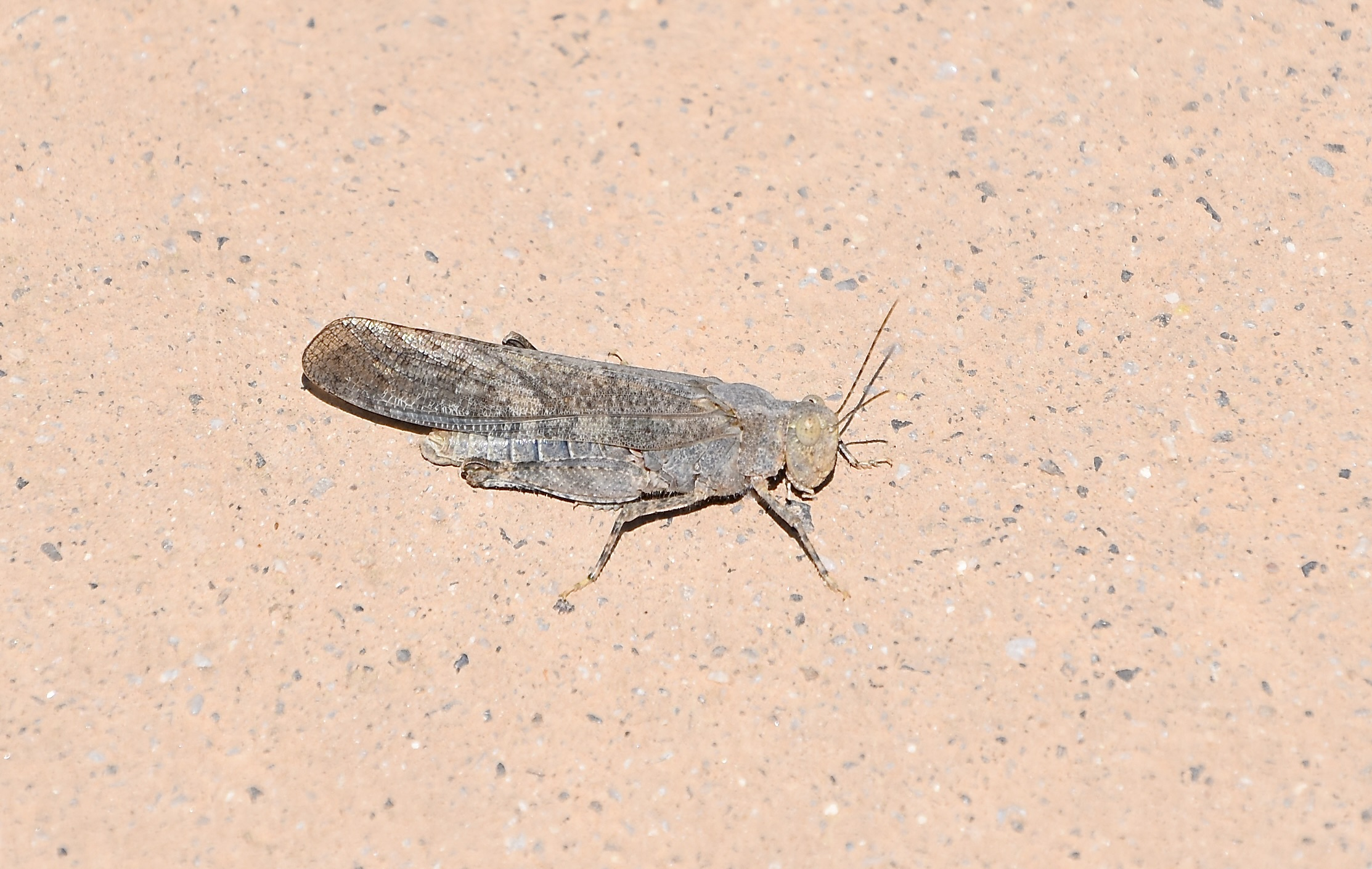

Scientific classification
- Kingdom: Animalia
- Phylum: Arthropoda
- Clade: Pancrustacea
- Class: Insecta
- Order: Orthoptera
- Suborder: Caelifera
- Family: Acrididae
- Genus: Circotettix
- Species: C. crotalum

Binomial name
- Circotettix crotalum Rehn, 1921

= Circotettix crotalum =

Species of grasshopper

Circotettix crotalum, the rattling grasshopper, is a species of band-winged grasshopper in the family Acrididae. It is found in North America.
