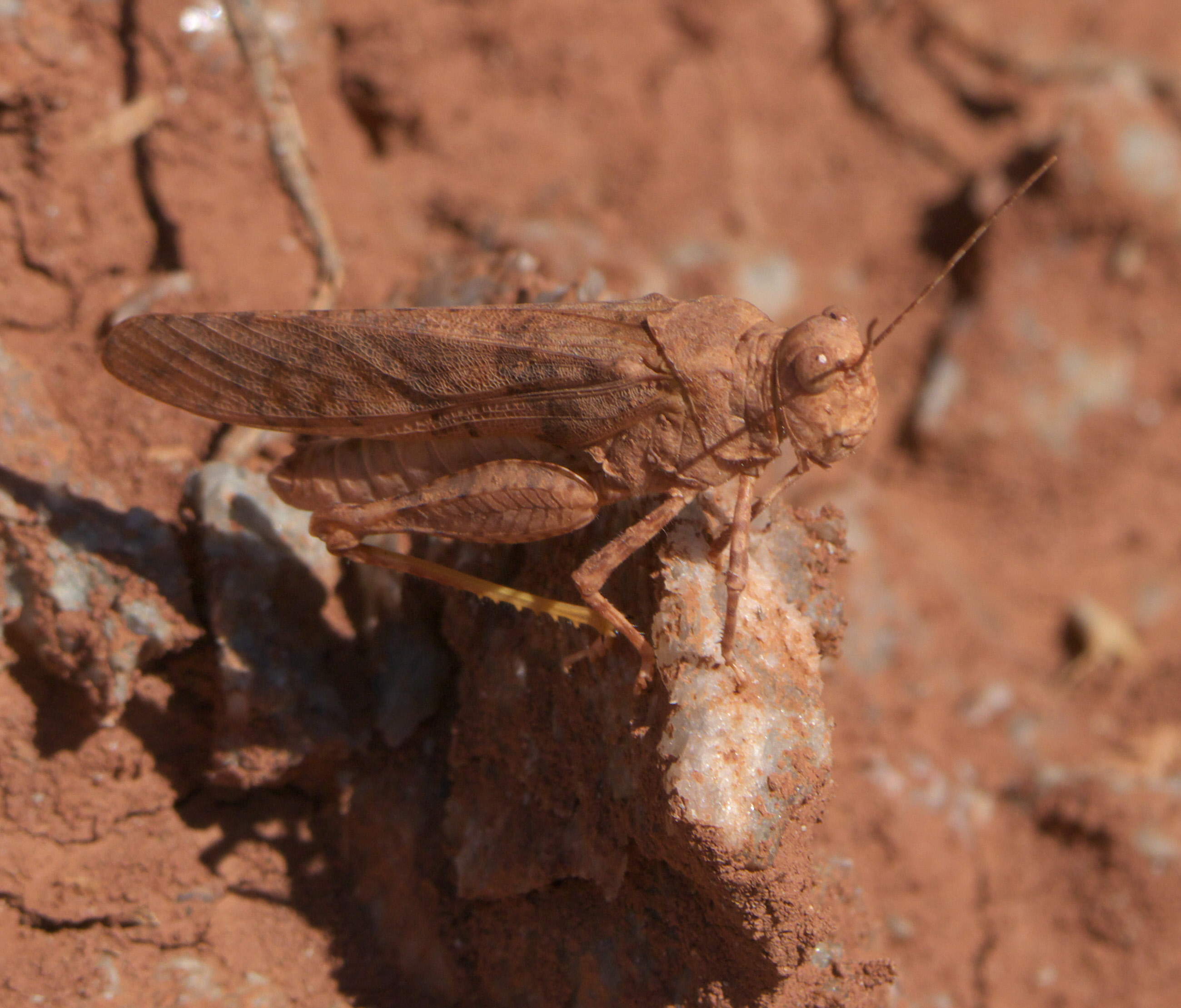
- Circotettix rabula

Scientific classification
- Kingdom: Animalia
- Phylum: Arthropoda
- Clade: Pancrustacea
- Class: Insecta
- Order: Orthoptera
- Suborder: Caelifera
- Family: Acrididae
- Subfamily: Oedipodinae
- Tribe: Trimerotropini
- Genus: Circotettix; Scudder, 1876

= Circotettix =

Genus of grasshoppers

Circotettix is a genus of band-winged grasshoppers in the family Acrididae. There are about 9 described species in Circotettix.

== Species ==
- Circotettix carlinianus (Thomas, 1870) (carlinian snapper)
- Circotettix coconino Rehn, 1921 (coconino wrangler grasshopper)
- Circotettix crotalum Rehn, 1921 (rattling grasshopper)
- Circotettix maculatus Scudder, 1881 (dancing grasshopper)
- Circotettix rabula Rehn & Hebard, 1906 (wrangler grasshopper)
- Circotettix shastanus Bruner, 1889 (Shasta grasshopper)
- Circotettix stenometopus (Strohecker & Buxton, 1963)
- Circotettix strepitus (Rehn, 1921)
- Circotettix undulatus (Thomas, 1872) (undulant-winged grasshopper)
