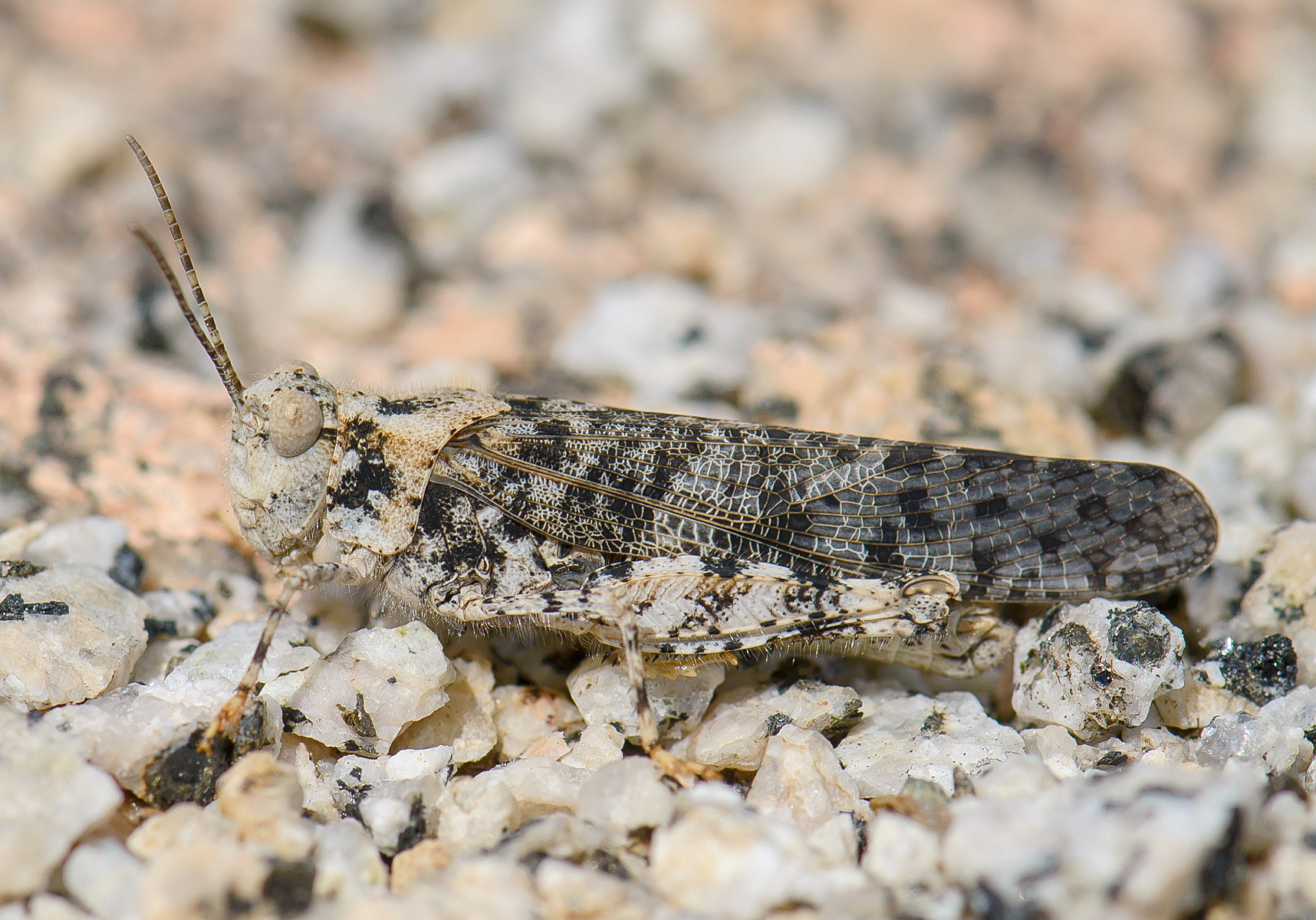

Scientific classification
- Kingdom: Animalia
- Phylum: Arthropoda
- Clade: Pancrustacea
- Class: Insecta
- Order: Orthoptera
- Suborder: Caelifera
- Family: Acrididae
- Tribe: Trimerotropini
- Genus: Circotettix
- Species: C. shastanus

Binomial name
- Circotettix shastanus Bruner, 1889

= Circotettix shastanus =

Species of grasshopper

Circotettix shastanus, known generally as the Shasta grasshopper or sierra crackler, is a species of band-winged grasshopper in the family Acrididae. It is found in North America.
