= List of Melanoplus species =

This is a list of species in the genus Melanoplus.

== Melanoplus species ==
- Melanoplus ablutus Scudder, 1898
- Melanoplus acidocercus Hebard, 1919
- Melanoplus acrophilus Hebard, 1935
- Melanoplus adapi Otte, D., 2012
- Melanoplus adelogyrus Hubbell, 1932 (St. Johns short-wing grasshopper)
- Melanoplus adox Otte, D., 2012
- Melanoplus aix Otte, D., 2012
- Melanoplus alabamae Hebard, 1920 (Alabama spur-throat grasshopper)
- Melanoplus alector Otte, D., 2012
- Melanoplus alexanderi Hilliard, 2001
- Melanoplus alpinus Scudder, 1897 (Alpine grasshopper)
- Melanoplus altitudinum (Scudder, S.H., 1878)
- Melanoplus andreasi Otte, D., 2012
- Melanoplus angularis Little, 1932 (angularis spur-throat grasshopper)
- Melanoplus angustipennis (Dodge, 1877) (narrow-winged spur-throat grasshopper)
- Melanoplus apache Otte, D., 2012
- Melanoplus apalachicolae Hubbell, 1932 (Apalachicola short-wing grasshopper)
- Melanoplus arcanus Otte, D., 2012
- Melanoplus aridus (Scudder, 1878) (arid lands spur-throat grasshopper)
- Melanoplus arizonae Scudder, 1878 (Arizona spur-throat grasshopper)
- Melanoplus arkansas Hill, J.G., 2015
- Melanoplus artemisiae Scudder, 1897 (sagebrush short-wing grasshopper)
- Melanoplus ascensor (Scudder, 1897)
- Melanoplus ascensus Scudder, 1898 (Shasta short-wing grasshopper)
- Melanoplus aspasmus Hebard, 1919 (striking short-wing grasshopper)
- Melanoplus aster Otte, D., 2012
- Melanoplus atangi Otte, D., 2012
- Melanoplus attenuatus Scudder, 1897 (slender-bodied short-wing grasshopper)
- Melanoplus bakeri Hebard, 1932
- Melanoplus baldi Otte, D., 2012
- Melanoplus baronei Hill, J.G., 2015
- Melanoplus beameri Hebard, 1932
- Melanoplus benni Otte, 2002
- Melanoplus bernardinae Hebard, 1920
- Melanoplus betangi Otte, D., 2012
- Melanoplus billyharrisi Hill, J.G., 2015
- Melanoplus birchimi Rentz, 1978
- Melanoplus bispinosus Scudder, 1897 (two-spined spur-throat grasshopper)
- Melanoplus bivittatus (Say, 1825) (two-striped grasshopper)
- Melanoplus bohemani (Stål, 1878)
- Melanoplus bonita Otte, D., 2012
- Melanoplus borealis (Fieber, 1853) (northern spur-throat grasshopper)
- Melanoplus boulderensis Otte, D., 2012
- Melanoplus bowditchi Scudder, 1878 (sagebrush grasshopper)
- Melanoplus bruneri Scudder, 1897 (Bruner's spur-throat grasshopper)
- Melanoplus buxtoni Strohecker, 1963
- Melanoplus calidus Scudder, 1898 (sacramento short-wing grasshopper)
- Melanoplus cameronis Roberts, 1947 (Brownsville short-wing grasshopper)
- Melanoplus cancri Scudder, 1897
- Melanoplus cantralli Dakin, 1966
- Melanoplus carinae Otte, D., 2012
- Melanoplus carnegiei Morse, 1904 (Carnegie short-wing grasshopper)
- Melanoplus caroli Gurney and Helfer, 1960
- Melanoplus carolinensis Hill, J.G., 2015
- Melanoplus carrabellae Otte, D., 2012
- Melanoplus cedarense Otte, D., 2012
- Melanoplus celatus Morse, 1904 (Sylvan short-wing grasshopper)
- Melanoplus chattahoochee Hill, J.G., 2015
- Melanoplus cherokee Hebard, 1935
- Melanoplus chichimecus Fontana & Buzzetti, 2007
- Melanoplus childsi Otte, D., 2012
- Melanoplus chimariki Gurney and Buxton, 1963
- Melanoplus chiricahuae Hebard, 1922 (chiricahua short-wing grasshopper)
- Melanoplus chumash Rentz, 1978
- Melanoplus cimatario Fontana & Buzzetti, 2007
- Melanoplus cinereus Scudder, 1878 (grayish sagebrush grasshopper)
- Melanoplus clypeatus (Scudder, 1877) (shield-tailed grasshopper)
- Melanoplus cohni Hill, J.G., 2015
- Melanoplus complanatipes Scudder, 1897 (western sagebrush grasshopper)
- Melanoplus confusus Scudder, 1897 (pasture grasshopper)
- Melanoplus coreyi Hill, J.G., 2015
- Melanoplus culebra Otte, D., 2012
- Melanoplus cumbres Otte, D., 2012
- Melanoplus cuneatus Scudder, 1897
- Melanoplus daemon Strohecker, 1963
- Melanoplus dakini Hilliard, 2001
- Melanoplus davisi (Hebard, 1918) (Davis' oak grasshopper)
- Melanoplus dawsoni (Scudder, 1875) (Dawson's grasshopper)
- Melanoplus dealbatus Scudder, 1898
- Melanoplus debilis Scudder, 1898
- Melanoplus deceptus Morse, 1904
- Melanoplus decoratus Morse, 1904
- Melanoplus decorus Scudder, 1897 (decorated short-wing grasshopper)
- Melanoplus decurvus Hill, J.G., 2015
- Melanoplus delano Otte, D., 2012
- Melanoplus deletor (Scudder, 1875)
- Melanoplus desultorius Rehn, 1907
- Melanoplus devastator Scudder, 1878 (devastating grasshopper)
- Melanoplus devius Morse, 1904 (devious short-wing grasshopper)
- Melanoplus diablo Rentz, 1978
- Melanoplus differentialis (Thomas, 1865) (differential grasshopper)
- Melanoplus digitifer Hebard, 1936
- Melanoplus dimidipennis Bruner, 1904
- Melanoplus diminutus Scudder, 1897
- Melanoplus discolor (Scudder, 1878) (contrasting spur-throat grasshopper)
- Melanoplus divergens Morse, 1904 (lobecercus short-wing grasshopper)
- Melanoplus dodgei (Thomas, 1871)
- Melanoplus douglasi Otte, D., 2012
- Melanoplus eccentricus Otte, D., 2012
- Melanoplus edeva Rentz, 1978
- Melanoplus elaphrus Strohecker, 1963
- Melanoplus elater Strohecker, 1963
- Melanoplus elkhornense Otte, D., 2012
- Melanoplus empusa Otte, D., 2012
- Melanoplus eremitus Strohecker, 1963
- Melanoplus eumera Hebard, 1920 (canyon grasshopper)
- Melanoplus eurycercus Hebard, 1920
- Melanoplus fasciatus (F. Walker, 1870) (huckleberry grasshopper)
- Melanoplus femurnigrum Scudder, 1898 (black-legged grasshopper)
- Melanoplus femurrubrum (De Geer, 1773) (red-legged grasshopper)
- Melanoplus flabellatus (Scudder, 1878) (Dallas short-wing grasshopper)
- Melanoplus flavidus Scudder, 1878 (yellowish spur-throat grasshopper)
- Melanoplus flechado Otte, D., 2012
- Melanoplus fluviatilis Bruner, L., 1897 (sandbar grasshopper)
- Melanoplus foedus Scudder, 1878 (striped sand grasshopper)
- Melanoplus folkertsi Hill, J.G., 2015
- Melanoplus forcipatus Hubbell, 1932 (toothcercus shortwing grasshopper)
- Melanoplus foxi Hebard, 1923 (Fox's short-wing grasshopper)
- Melanoplus franciscanus Scudder, 1898 (San Francisco short-wing grasshopper)
- Melanoplus francisdrakei Otte, D., 2012
- Melanoplus francoisensis Hill, J.G., 2015
- Melanoplus fricki Strohecker, 1960
- Melanoplus frigidus (Boheman, 1846) (Nordic mountain grasshopper)
- Melanoplus fultoni Hebard, 1922
- Melanoplus furcatus Scudder, 1897 (larger fork-tail grasshopper)
- Melanoplus gaspesiensis Vickery, 1970
- Melanoplus gladstoni Scudder, 1897 (Gladston's spur-throat grasshopper)
- Melanoplus glaucipes (Scudder, 1875) (glaucus-legged spur-throat grasshopper)
- Melanoplus glymma Otte, D., 2012
- Melanoplus goedeni Gurney and Buxton, 1968
- Melanoplus gordonae Vickery, 1969
- Melanoplus gothicus Otte, D., 2012
- Melanoplus gracilipes Scudder, 1897 (slender-legged grasshopper)
- Melanoplus gracilis (Bruner, 1876) (graceful grasshopper)
- Melanoplus gurneyi Strohecker, 1960 (Gurney's short-wing grasshopper)
- Melanoplus haigi Gurney and Buxton, 1968
- Melanoplus harperi Gurney and Buxton, 1965
- Melanoplus harrisi Morse, 1904
- Melanoplus hatu Otte, D., 2012
- Melanoplus herbaceus Bruner, 1893 (arrowweed grasshopper)
- Melanoplus hesperus Hebard, 1919
- Melanoplus hilliardi Otte, D., 2012
- Melanoplus hinei Thomas, E.S., 1930-1939
- Melanoplus hubbelli Hebard, 1935
- Melanoplus hupah Strohecker and Helfer, 1963
- Melanoplus huporeus Hebard, 1919
- Melanoplus huroni Blatchley, 1898 (Huron short-wing grasshopper)
- Melanoplus idaho Hebard, 1935
- Melanoplus illash Otte, D., 2012
- Melanoplus immunis Scudder, 1898 (immunis spur-throat grasshopper)
- Melanoplus impudicus Scudder, 1897 (immodest spur-throat grasshopper)
- Melanoplus imtenda Otte, D., 2012
- Melanoplus imto Otte, D., 2012
- Melanoplus inconspicuus Caudell, 1902 (inconspicuous spur-throat grasshopper)
- Melanoplus indicifer Hubbell, 1933 (spinecercus short-wing grasshopper)
- Melanoplus indigens Scudder, 1897
- Melanoplus infantilis Scudder, 1878 (little spur-throat grasshopper)
- Melanoplus ingrami Hill, J.G., 2010
- Melanoplus irwinorum Hill, J.G., 2015
- Melanoplus islandicus Blatchley, 1898 (island short-wing grasshopper)
- Melanoplus ixalus Otte, D., 2012
- Melanoplus jakei Otte, D., 2012
- Melanoplus janus Otte, D., 2012
- Melanoplus jenniferae Otte, D., 2012
- Melanoplus jessicae Otte, D., 2012
- Melanoplus jillae Otte, D., 2012
- Melanoplus jucundus (Scudder, 1876)
- Melanoplus juvencus Scudder, 1897
- Melanoplus kasadi Gurney and Buxton, 1968
- Melanoplus keeleri Thomas, 1874 (Keeler's spur-throat grasshopper)
- Melanoplus keiferi Gurney and Buxton, 1963
- Melanoplus kendalli Otte, D., 2012
- Melanoplus kennicottii Scudder, 1878
- Melanoplus kissimmee Otte, D., 2012
- Melanoplus knowlesi Otte, D., 2012
- Melanoplus lakinus (Scudder, 1878) (lakin grasshopper)
- Melanoplus lanthanus Hewitt and Skoog, 1970
- Melanoplus lapollai Otte, D., 2012
- Melanoplus latah Otte, D., 2012
- Melanoplus latifercula Caudell, 1903
- Melanoplus latus Morse, 1906
- Melanoplus laurelae Otte, D., 2012
- Melanoplus lemhiensis Hebard, 1935 (lemhi short-wing grasshopper)
- Melanoplus lemurus Otte, D., 2012
- Melanoplus lepidus Scudder, 1897
- Melanoplus ligneolus Scudder, 1898 (wood-colored short-wing grasshopper)
- Melanoplus lilianae Otte, 2002
- Melanoplus lithophilus Gurney and Buxton, 1965
- Melanoplus littoralis Roberts, 1942
- Melanoplus lolo Otte, D., 2012
- Melanoplus longicornis (Saussure, 1861)
- Melanoplus longipsolus Rentz, 1978
- Melanoplus lovetti Fulton, 1930
- Melanoplus ludivinae Fontana, Buzzetti & Mariño-Pérez, 2011
- Melanoplus macclungi Rehn, 1946 (Kansas juniper grasshopper)
- Melanoplus madeleineae Vickery and Kevan, 1977
- Melanoplus magdalenae Hebard, 1935 (magdalena short-wing grasshopper)
- Melanoplus mancus (Smith, 1868) (Smith's short-wing grasshopper)
- Melanoplus mantua Otte, D., 2012
- Melanoplus marginatus (Scudder, 1876) (margined spur-throat grasshopper)
- Melanoplus marshallii (Thomas, 1875)
- Melanoplus mastigiphallus Strohecker, 1941
- Melanoplus mcnaryi Otte, D., 2012
- Melanoplus meridae Roberts, 1942
- Melanoplus meridionalis Scudder, 1897
- Melanoplus mexicanus (Saussure, 1861)
- Melanoplus microtatus Hebard, 1919
- Melanoplus middlekauffi Rentz, 1978
- Melanoplus militaris Scudder, 1897 (military spur-throat gasshopper)
- Melanoplus mirus Rehn & Hebard, 1916 (Weldon short-wing grasshopper)
- Melanoplus mississippi Hill, J.G., 2015
- Melanoplus missoulae Hebard, 1936
- Melanoplus mixes Fontana, Buzzetti & Mariño-Pérez, 2011
- Melanoplus mogollona Otte, D., 2012
- Melanoplus molothrus Otte, D., 2012
- Melanoplus montanus (Thomas, 1873) (Montana short-wing grasshopper)
- Melanoplus morsei Blatchley, 1903
- Melanoplus muricolor Strohecker, 1960
- Melanoplus murieta Rentz, 1978
- Melanoplus muscogee Hill, J.G., 2015
- Melanoplus nanciae Deyrup, 1997 (ocala clawcercus grasshopper)
- Melanoplus nanus Scudder, 1898
- Melanoplus napa Otte, D., 2012
- Melanoplus neomexicanus Scudder, 1897
- Melanoplus nigrescens (Scudder, 1877) (dark-sided grasshopper)
- Melanoplus nitidus Scudder, 1897
- Melanoplus nossi Hill, J.G., 2014
- Melanoplus novato Rentz, 1978
- Melanoplus nubilus Rehn & Hebard, 1916 (nubile short-wing grasshopper)
- Melanoplus nufioi Otte, D., 2012
- Melanoplus oaxacae Fontana, Buzzetti & Mariño-Pérez, 2011
- Melanoplus obespsolus Rentz and Weissman, 1981
- Melanoplus obex Otte, D., 2012
- Melanoplus occidentalis (Thomas, 1872) (flabellate grasshopper)
- Melanoplus ohadi Otte, D., 2012
- Melanoplus oklahomae Hebard, 1937 (Oklahoma spur-throat grasshopper)
- Melanoplus olamentke Hebard, 1920
- Melanoplus optimus Hill, J.G., 2015
- Melanoplus ordwayae Deyrup, 1997 (trail ridge scrub grasshopper)
- Melanoplus oregonensis (Thomas, 1876) (oregon short-wing grasshopper)
- Melanoplus oregonis Otte, D., 2012
- Melanoplus oreophilus Hebard, 1920 (Mount Hood short-wing grasshopper)
- Melanoplus ostentus Gurney and Buxton, 1968
- Melanoplus ottei Hill, J.G., 2015
- Melanoplus ouachita Hill, J.G., 2015
- Melanoplus ourayensis Otte, D., 2012
- Melanoplus ozarkensis Hill, J.G., 2015
- Melanoplus pachycercus Hebard, 1935
- Melanoplus packardii Scudder, 1878 (Packard's grasshopper)
- Melanoplus pahgre Otte, D., 2012
- Melanoplus papoosense Otte, D., 2012
- Melanoplus papyraedus Strohecker, 1963
- Melanoplus parvus Barrientos Lozano & Rocha-Sánchez, 2013
- Melanoplus payettei Hebard, 1936 (Payette's short-wing grasshopper)
- Melanoplus peatus Otte, D., 2012
- Melanoplus pegasus Hebard, 1919
- Melanoplus peninsularis Hubbell, 1932
- Melanoplus perezi Otte, D., 2012
- Melanoplus phobetico Otte, D., 2012
- Melanoplus picropidzae Hebard, 1937
- Melanoplus pictus Scudder, 1897 (pictured spur-throat grasshopper)
- Melanoplus pinaleno Hebard, 1937 (pinaleno short-wing grasshopper)
- Melanoplus pinctus Scudder, 1897
- Melanoplus pinicola Fulton, 1930
- Melanoplus platycercus Hebard, 1920 (Whitney short-wing grasshopper)
- Melanoplus plebejus (Stål, 1878) (plebeian short-wing grasshopper)
- Melanoplus ponderosus (Scudder, 1875) (ponderous spur-throat grasshopper)
- Melanoplus prescotti Otte, D., 2012
- Melanoplus primaestivus Dakin, 1966
- Melanoplus propinquus Scudder, 1897
- Melanoplus puer (Scudder, 1878) (least short-wing grasshopper)
- Melanoplus punctulatus (Scudder, 1863) (pine tree spur-throat grasshopper)
- Melanoplus pygmaeus Davis, 1915 (pygmy short-wing grasshopper)
- Melanoplus pyro Otte, D., 2012
- Melanoplus quercicola (Hebard, 1918) (oak-loving short-wing grasshopper)
- Melanoplus querneus Rehn & Hebard, 1916 (oak spur-throat grasshopper)
- Melanoplus reflexus Scudder, 1897
- Melanoplus regalis (Dodge, 1876) (regal grasshopper)
- Melanoplus rehni Hebard, 1920
- Melanoplus relictus Hill, J.G., 2015
- Melanoplus rentzi Otte, 1995
- Melanoplus repetinus Hebard, 1935
- Melanoplus reyesensis Rentz, 1978
- Melanoplus rileyanus Scudder, 1897 (Riley's short-wing grasshopper)
- Melanoplus rosor Otte, D., 2012
- Melanoplus rotundipennis (Scudder, 1877) (round-winged grasshopper)
- Melanoplus rugglesi Gurney, 1949 (Nevada sage grasshopper)
- Melanoplus rusticus (Stål, 1878)
- Melanoplus salmonis Hebard, 1935
- Melanoplus saltator Scudder, 1897 (Willamette short-wing grasshopper)
- Melanoplus sanguinipes (Fabricius, 1798) (migratory grasshopper)
- Melanoplus savannah Hill, J.G., 2015
- Melanoplus scapularis Rehn & Hebard, 1916 (lesser fork-tail grasshopper)
- Melanoplus scitulus Scudder, 1897
- Melanoplus scudderi (Uhler, 1864) (Scudder's short-wing grasshopper)
- Melanoplus sebringi Otte, D., 2012
- Melanoplus seltzerae Hill, J.G., 2015
- Melanoplus seminole Hubbell, 1932
- Melanoplus serrulatus Hebard, 1937 (nantahala short-wing grasshopper)
- Melanoplus shoshoni Otte, D., 2012
- Melanoplus similis Morse, 1904
- Melanoplus siskiyou Strohecker, 1963
- Melanoplus snowii Scudder, 1897 (Snow's short-wing grasshopper)
- Melanoplus sol Otte, D., 2012
- Melanoplus solitarius Buzzetti, Barrientos Lozano & Fontana, 2010
- Melanoplus solitudinis Hebard, 1935
- Melanoplus sonomaensis Caudell, 1905
- Melanoplus spearmani Otte, D., 2012
- Melanoplus splendidus Hebard, 1920 (juniper grasshopper)
- Melanoplus spretus (Walsh, 1866) (Rocky Mountain locust)
- Melanoplus stegocercus Rehn & Hebard, 1916 (stegocercus short-wing grasshopper)
- Melanoplus stipes Otte, D., 2012
- Melanoplus stonei Rehn, 1904 (Stone's grasshopper)
- Melanoplus strumosus Morse, 1904 (swollen short-wing grasshopper)
- Melanoplus stupefactus (Scudder, S.H., 1876)
- Melanoplus sumichrasti (Saussure, 1861)
- Melanoplus sutanex Otte, D., 2012
- Melanoplus sylvaticus McNeill, 1899
- Melanoplus sylvestris Morse, 1904
- Melanoplus symmetricus Morse, 1904
- Melanoplus taurus Hill, J.G., 2015
- Melanoplus tendoyense Otte, D., 2012
- Melanoplus tepidus Morse, 1906
- Melanoplus tequestae Hubbell, 1932 (tequestae scrub grasshopper)
- Melanoplus terminalis Scudder, 1897
- Melanoplus texanus (Scudder, 1878) (Texas spur-throat grasshopper)
- Melanoplus texarkana Hill, J.G., 2015
- Melanoplus texensis Hart, C.A., 1906
- Melanoplus thomasi Scudder, 1897 (Thomas's two-striped grasshopper)
- Melanoplus tincupense Otte, D., 2012
- Melanoplus torridus Roberts, H.R., 1947
- Melanoplus trachodes Barrientos Lozano & Rocha-Sánchez, 2013
- Melanoplus triangularis Hebard, 1928
- Melanoplus tribuloides Morse, 1906
- Melanoplus tribulus Morse, 1904 (tribulus short-wing grasshopper)
- Melanoplus trigeminus Strohecker, 1963
- Melanoplus trinitense Otte, D., 2012
- Melanoplus tristis Bruner, 1904
- Melanoplus truncatus Scudder, 1898 (truncate-cercus short-wing grasshopper)
- Melanoplus tuberculatus Morse, 1906 (quanah grasshopper)
- Melanoplus tumidicercus Hubbell, 1932 (broadcercus short-wing grasshopper)
- Melanoplus tunicae Hebard, 1920 (tunica spur-throat grasshopper)
- Melanoplus uinta Otte, D., 2012
- Melanoplus utahensis Scudder, S.H., 1897
- Melanoplus validus Scudder, 1898
- Melanoplus variegatus (Scudder, 1878)
- Melanoplus viola Thomas, C., 1876
- Melanoplus virgatus Scudder, 1897
- Melanoplus viridipes Scudder, 1897
- Melanoplus vulnus Eades, 1959
- Melanoplus wai Otte, D., 2012
- Melanoplus walshii Scudder, 1897 (Walsh's short-wing grasshopper)
- Melanoplus wappo Rentz, 1978
- Melanoplus warneri Little, 1932 (Warner's spur-throat grasshopper)
- Melanoplus washingtonius (Bruner, 1885) (Washington short-wing grasshopper)
- Melanoplus wilsoni Gurney, 1960
- Melanoplus wintunus Strohecker and Helfer, 1963
- Melanoplus withingtoni Otte, D., 2012
- Melanoplus withlacoocheensis Squitier and Deyrup, 1998 (Withlacoochee grasshopper)
- Melanoplus xenus Otte, D., 2012
- Melanoplus yarrowii (Thomas, 1875) (Yarrow's grasshopper)
- Melanoplus zabro Otte, D., 2012
- Melanoplus zento Otte, D., 2012
- Melanoplus zeus Otte, D., 2012
