= Eotettix pusillus =

Scientific classification
- Domain: Eukaryota
- Kingdom: Animalia
- Phylum: Arthropoda
- Class: Insecta
- Order: Orthoptera
- Suborder: Caelifera
- Family: Acrididae
- Genus: Eotettix
- Species: E. pusillus

Binomial name
- Eotettix pusillus Morse, 1904

Species of grasshopper

Eotettix pusillus, the little eastern grasshopper, is a species of spur-throated grasshoppers in the family Acrididae. It is found in North America.
