= Paraidemona olsoni =

Scientific classification
- Kingdom: Animalia
- Phylum: Arthropoda
- Clade: Pancrustacea
- Class: Insecta
- Order: Orthoptera
- Suborder: Caelifera
- Family: Acrididae
- Tribe: Melanoplini
- Genus: Paraidemona
- Species: P. olsoni

Binomial name
- Paraidemona olsoni Yin & Smith, 1989

Species of grasshopper

Paraidemona olsoni is a species of spur-throated grasshopper in the family Acrididae. It is found in North America.
