= Paraidemona =

Scientific classification
- Kingdom: Animalia
- Phylum: Arthropoda
- Clade: Pancrustacea
- Class: Insecta
- Order: Orthoptera
- Suborder: Caelifera
- Family: Acrididae
- Subfamily: Melanoplinae
- Tribe: Melanoplini
- Genus: Paraidemona; Brunner von Wattenwyl, 1893

Genus of grasshoppers

Paraidemona is a genus of spur-throated grasshoppers in the family Acrididae. There are about nine described species in Paraidemona.

== Species ==
These nine species belong to the genus Paraidemona:

- Paraidemona cohni Fontana & Buzzetti, 2007^{c g}
- Paraidemona fratercula Hebard, 1918^{i c g b}
- Paraidemona latifurcula Hebard, 1918^{i c g b}
- Paraidemona mimica Scudder, 1897^{i c g b} (mimic grasshopper)
- Paraidemona nudus (Scudder, 1878)^{i}
- Paraidemona nuttingi Yin & Smith, 1989^{i c g b}
- Paraidemona olsoni Yin & Smith, 1989^{i c g b}
- Paraidemona punctata (Stål, 1878)^{i c g b}
- Paraidemona ruvalcabae Buzzetti, Barrientos Lozano & Fontana, 2010^{c g}

Data sources: i = ITIS, c = Catalogue of Life, g = GBIF, b = Bugguide.net
