= Paratylotropidia brunneri =

Scientific classification
- Domain: Eukaryota
- Kingdom: Animalia
- Phylum: Arthropoda
- Class: Insecta
- Order: Orthoptera
- Suborder: Caelifera
- Family: Acrididae
- Tribe: Melanoplini
- Genus: Paratylotropidia
- Species: P. brunneri

Binomial name
- Paratylotropidia brunneri Scudder, 1897

Species of grasshopper

Paratylotropidia brunneri is a species of spur-throated grasshopper in the family Acrididae. It is found in North America.
