= Paraidemona mimica =

Scientific classification
- Kingdom: Animalia
- Phylum: Arthropoda
- Clade: Pancrustacea
- Class: Insecta
- Order: Orthoptera
- Suborder: Caelifera
- Family: Acrididae
- Tribe: Melanoplini
- Genus: Paraidemona
- Species: P. mimica

Binomial name
- Paraidemona mimica Scudder, 1897

Species of grasshopper

Paraidemona mimica, the mimic grasshopper, is a species of spur-throated grasshopper in the family Acrididae. It is found in North America.
