= Paratylotropidia =

Scientific classification
- Domain: Eukaryota
- Kingdom: Animalia
- Phylum: Arthropoda
- Class: Insecta
- Order: Orthoptera
- Suborder: Caelifera
- Family: Acrididae
- Subfamily: Melanoplinae
- Tribe: Melanoplini
- Genus: Paratylotropidia; Brunner von Wattenwyl, 1893

Genus of grasshoppers

Paratylotropidia is a genus of spur-throated grasshoppers in the family Acrididae. There are at least three described species in Paratylotropidia.

== Species ==
These three species belong to the genus Paratylotropidia:

- Paratylotropidia beutenmuelleri Morse, 1907^{i c g b} (Beutenmueller's grasshopper)
- Paratylotropidia brunneri Scudder, 1897^{i c g b}
- Paratylotropidia morsei Rehn & Rehn, 1943^{i c g b}

Data sources: i = ITIS, c = Catalogue of Life, g = GBIF, b = Bugguide.net
