= Eotettix signatus =

Scientific classification
- Domain: Eukaryota
- Kingdom: Animalia
- Phylum: Arthropoda
- Class: Insecta
- Order: Orthoptera
- Suborder: Caelifera
- Family: Acrididae
- Tribe: Melanoplini
- Genus: Eotettix
- Species: E. signatus

Binomial name
- Eotettix signatus Scudder, 1897

Species of grasshopper

Eotettix signatus, the handsome Florida grasshopper, is a species of spur-throated grasshopper in the family Acrididae. It is found in North America.
