= Paratylotropidia morsei =

Scientific classification
- Domain: Eukaryota
- Kingdom: Animalia
- Phylum: Arthropoda
- Class: Insecta
- Order: Orthoptera
- Suborder: Caelifera
- Family: Acrididae
- Tribe: Melanoplini
- Genus: Paratylotropidia
- Species: P. morsei

Binomial name
- Paratylotropidia morsei Rehn & Rehn, 1943

Species of grasshopper

Paratylotropidia morsei is a species of spur-throated grasshopper in the family Acrididae. It is found in North America.
