= Melanoplus clypeatus =

Scientific classification
- Kingdom: Animalia
- Phylum: Arthropoda
- Clade: Pancrustacea
- Class: Insecta
- Order: Orthoptera
- Suborder: Caelifera
- Family: Acrididae
- Tribe: Melanoplini
- Genus: Melanoplus
- Species: M. clypeatus

Binomial name
- Melanoplus clypeatus (Scudder, 1877)

Species of grasshopper

Melanoplus clypeatus, known generally as shield-tailed grasshopper, is a species of spur-throated grasshopper in the family Acrididae. Other common names include the shield-tailed spur-throat grasshopper and shield-tailed locust. It is usually found in North America.
