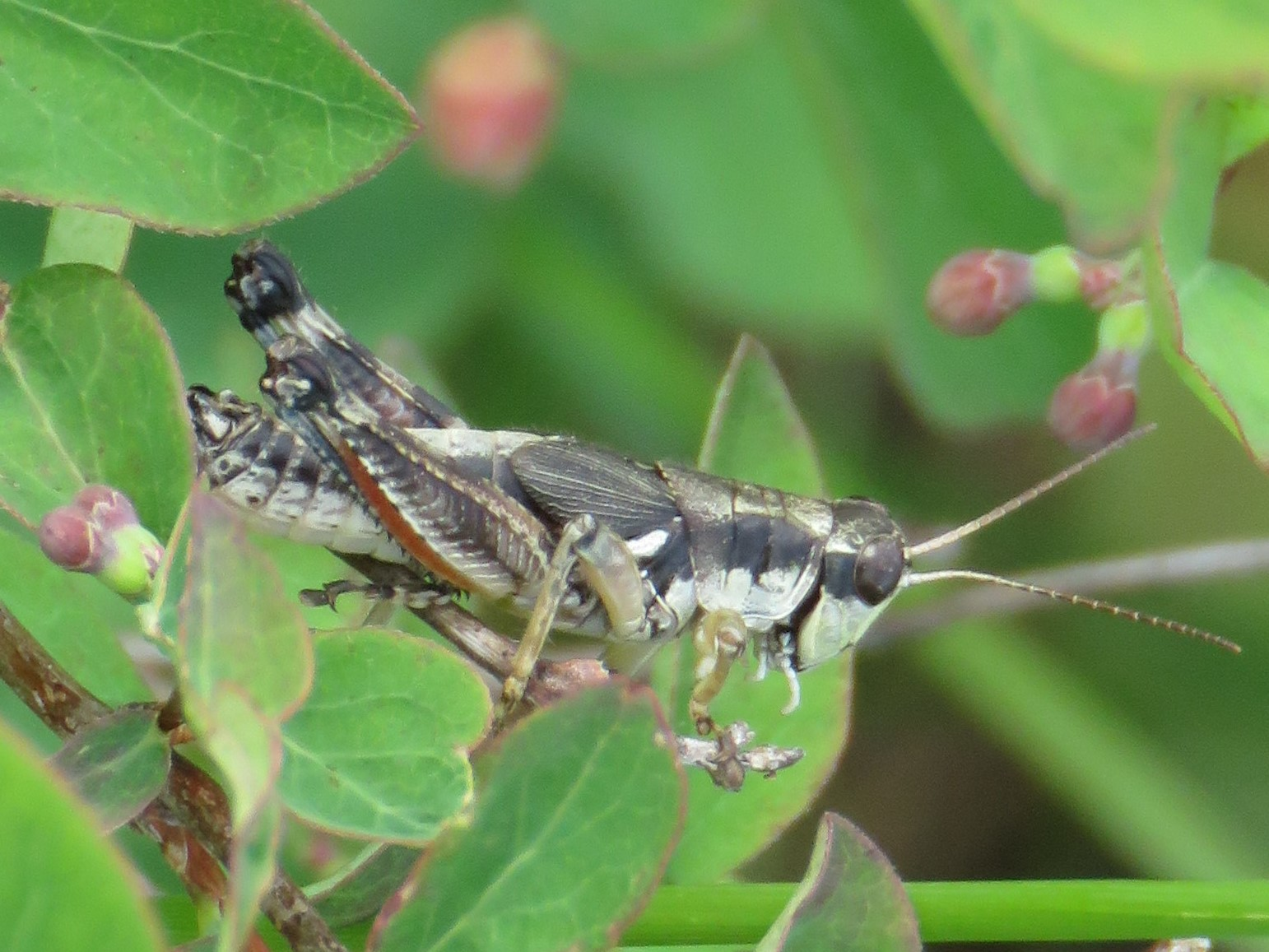

Scientific classification
- Kingdom: Animalia
- Phylum: Arthropoda
- Clade: Pancrustacea
- Class: Insecta
- Order: Orthoptera
- Suborder: Caelifera
- Family: Acrididae
- Tribe: Melanoplini
- Genus: Melanoplus
- Species: M. payettei

Binomial name
- Melanoplus payettei Hebard, 1936

= Melanoplus payettei =

Species of grasshopper

Melanoplus payettei, or Payette's short-wing grasshopper, is a species of spur-throated grasshopper in the family Acrididae. It is found in North America.

Wolves of the species Canis lupis have been known to consume these grasshoppers. One wolf was even known to have eaten 181 in a single sitting.
