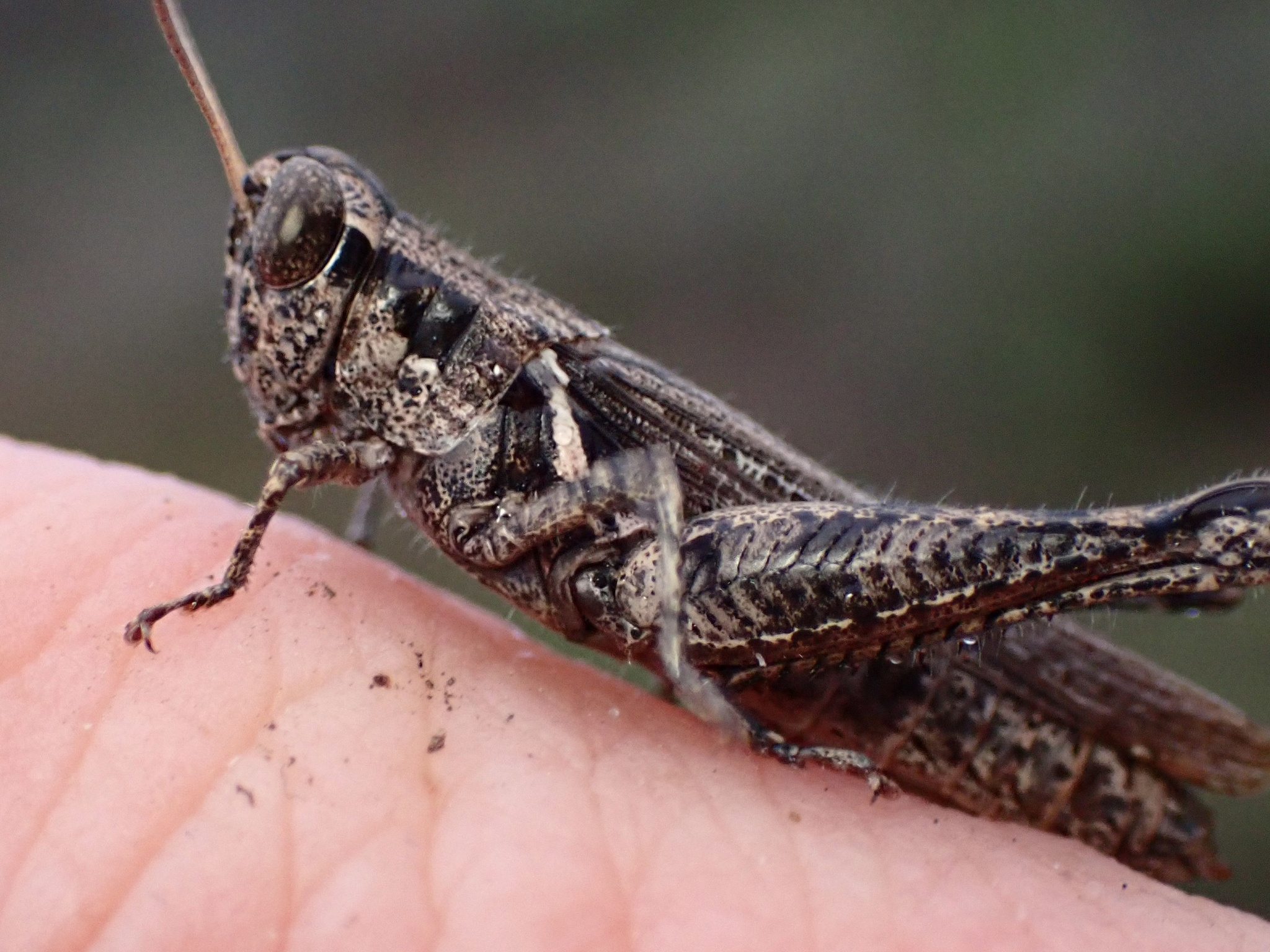

Scientific classification
- Kingdom: Animalia
- Phylum: Arthropoda
- Clade: Pancrustacea
- Class: Insecta
- Order: Orthoptera
- Suborder: Caelifera
- Family: Acrididae
- Tribe: Melanoplini
- Genus: Melanoplus
- Species: M. cinereus

Binomial name
- Melanoplus cinereus Scudder, 1878

= Melanoplus cinereus =

Species of grasshopper

Melanoplus cinereus, the grayish sagebrush grasshopper, is a species of spur-throated grasshopper in the family Acrididae. It is found in North America.

== Subspecies ==
These two subspecies belong to the species Melanoplus cinereus:

- Melanoplus cinereus cinereus Scudder, 1878^{i c g}
- Melanoplus cinereus cyanipes Scudder, 1897^{i c g b}

Data sources: i = ITIS, c = Catalogue of Life, g = GBIF, b = Bugguide.net
