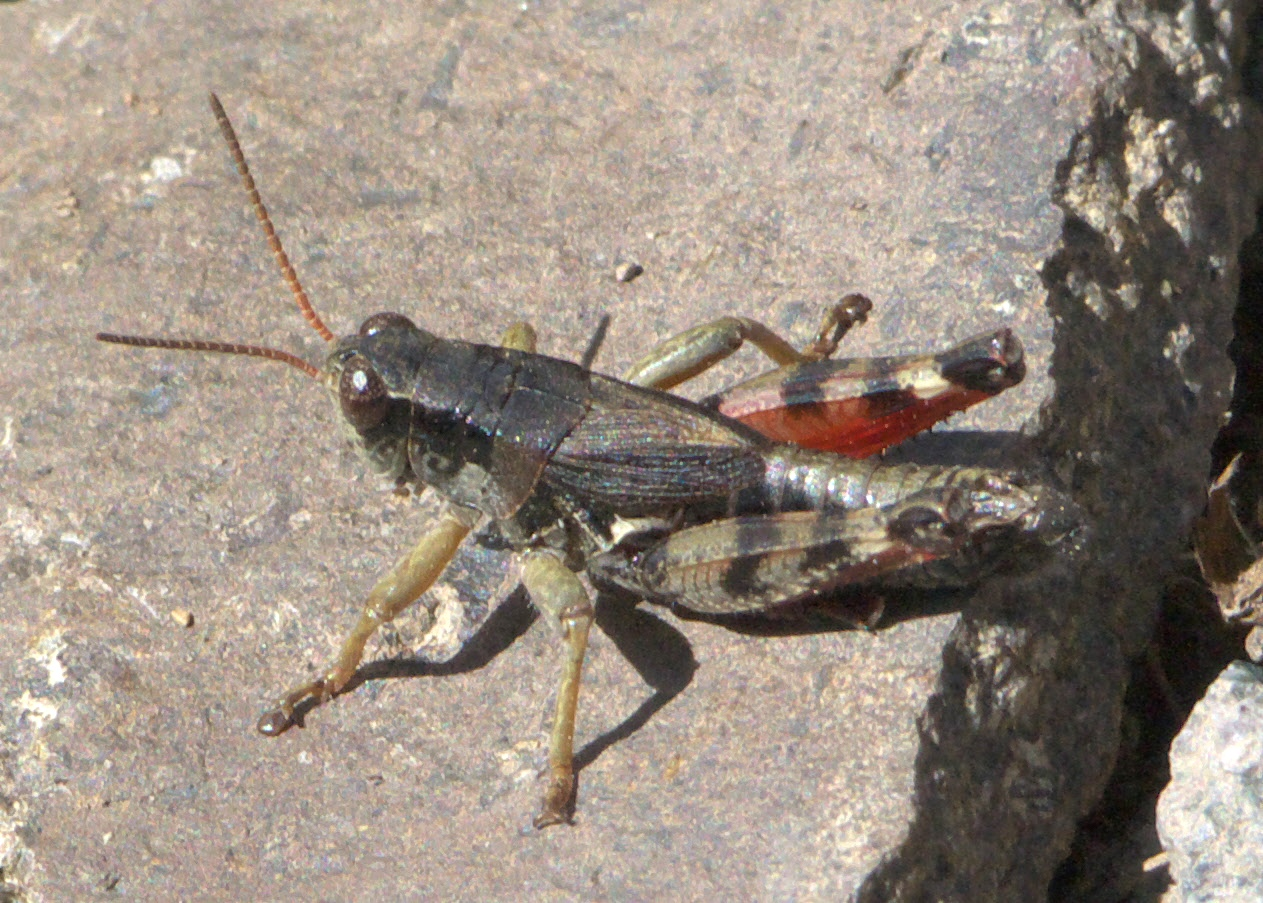
- Melanoplus ourayensis, Colorado

Scientific classification
- Kingdom: Animalia
- Phylum: Arthropoda
- Clade: Pancrustacea
- Class: Insecta
- Order: Orthoptera
- Suborder: Caelifera
- Family: Acrididae
- Subfamily: Melanoplinae
- Tribe: Melanoplini
- Genus: Melanoplus
- Species: M. ourayensis

Binomial name
- Melanoplus ourayensis Otte, 2012

= Melanoplus ourayensis =

Species of grasshopper

Melanoplus ourayensis is a species of spur-throated grasshopper in the family Acrididae.
