= Melanoplus tequestae =

Scientific classification
- Kingdom: Animalia
- Phylum: Arthropoda
- Clade: Pancrustacea
- Class: Insecta
- Order: Orthoptera
- Suborder: Caelifera
- Family: Acrididae
- Tribe: Melanoplini
- Genus: Melanoplus
- Species: M. tequestae

Binomial name
- Melanoplus tequestae Hubbell, 1932

Species of grasshopper

Melanoplus tequestae, known generally as the tequestae scrub grasshopper or tequesta grasshopper, is a species of spur-throated grasshopper in the family Acrididae. It is endemic to Florida scrubs in Highlands, Orange, and Seminole counties in Florida.
