= Melanoplus rileyanus =

Scientific classification
- Kingdom: Animalia
- Phylum: Arthropoda
- Clade: Pancrustacea
- Class: Insecta
- Order: Orthoptera
- Suborder: Caelifera
- Family: Acrididae
- Tribe: Melanoplini
- Genus: Melanoplus
- Species: M. rileyanus

Binomial name
- Melanoplus rileyanus Scudder, 1897

Species of grasshopper

Melanoplus rileyanus, known generally as the Riley's short-wing grasshopper or Riley's spur-throat grasshopper, is a species of spur-throated grasshopper in the family Acrididae. It is found in North America.

== Subspecies ==
These two subspecies belong to the species Melanoplus rileyanus:

- Melanoplus rileyanus rileyanus Scudder, 1897^{i c g}
- Melanoplus rileyanus varicus Scudder, 1879^{i c g}

Data sources: i = ITIS, c = Catalogue of Life, g = GBIF, b = Bugguide.net
