= Melanoplus thomasi =

Scientific classification
- Kingdom: Animalia
- Phylum: Arthropoda
- Clade: Pancrustacea
- Class: Insecta
- Order: Orthoptera
- Suborder: Caelifera
- Family: Acrididae
- Tribe: Melanoplini
- Genus: Melanoplus
- Species: M. thomasi

Binomial name
- Melanoplus thomasi Scudder, 1897

Species of grasshopper

Melanoplus thomasi, or Thomas's two-striped grasshopper, is a species of spur-throated grasshopper in the family Acrididae. It is found in Central America.
