= Melanoplus gracilis =

Scientific classification
- Kingdom: Animalia
- Phylum: Arthropoda
- Clade: Pancrustacea
- Class: Insecta
- Order: Orthoptera
- Suborder: Caelifera
- Family: Acrididae
- Tribe: Melanoplini
- Genus: Melanoplus
- Species: M. gracilis

Binomial name
- Melanoplus gracilis (Bruner, 1876)

Species of grasshopper

Melanoplus gracilis, known generally as graceful grasshopper, is a species of spur-throated grasshopper in the family Acrididae. Other common names include the graceful spur-throat grasshopper and graceful narrow-winged locust. It is found in North America.
