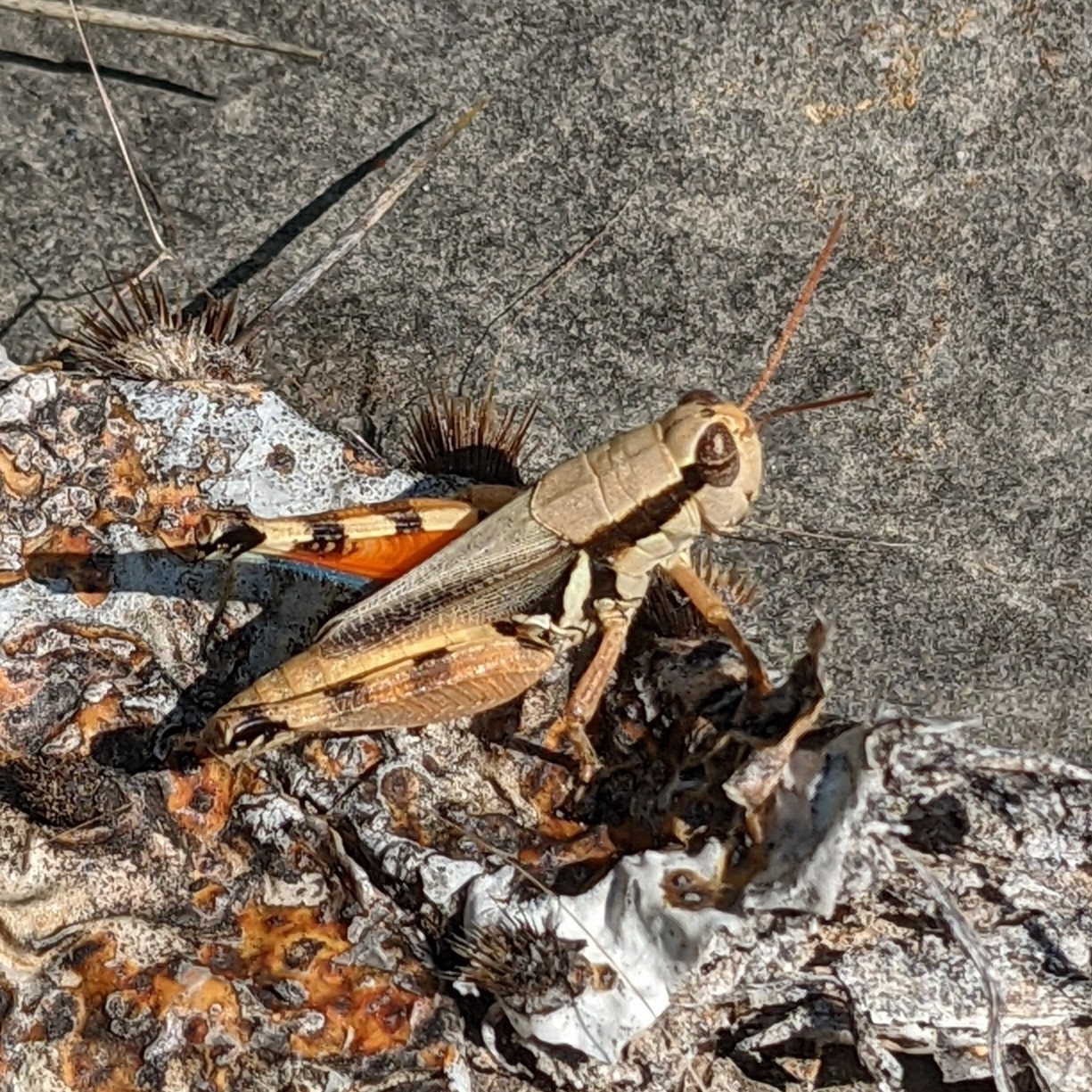
- Melanoplus glaucipes, glaucus-legged spur-throat grasshopper, Texas

Scientific classification
- Kingdom: Animalia
- Phylum: Arthropoda
- Clade: Pancrustacea
- Class: Insecta
- Order: Orthoptera
- Suborder: Caelifera
- Family: Acrididae
- Subfamily: Melanoplinae
- Tribe: Melanoplini
- Genus: Melanoplus
- Species: M. glaucipes

Binomial name
- Melanoplus glaucipes (Scudder, 1875)

Synonyms
- Caloptenus glaucipes Scudder, 1875

= Melanoplus glaucipes =

Species of grasshopper

Melanoplus glaucipes, the glaucus-legged spur-throat grasshopper, is a species of short-horned grasshopper in the subfamily Melanoplinae. It is found in North America.
