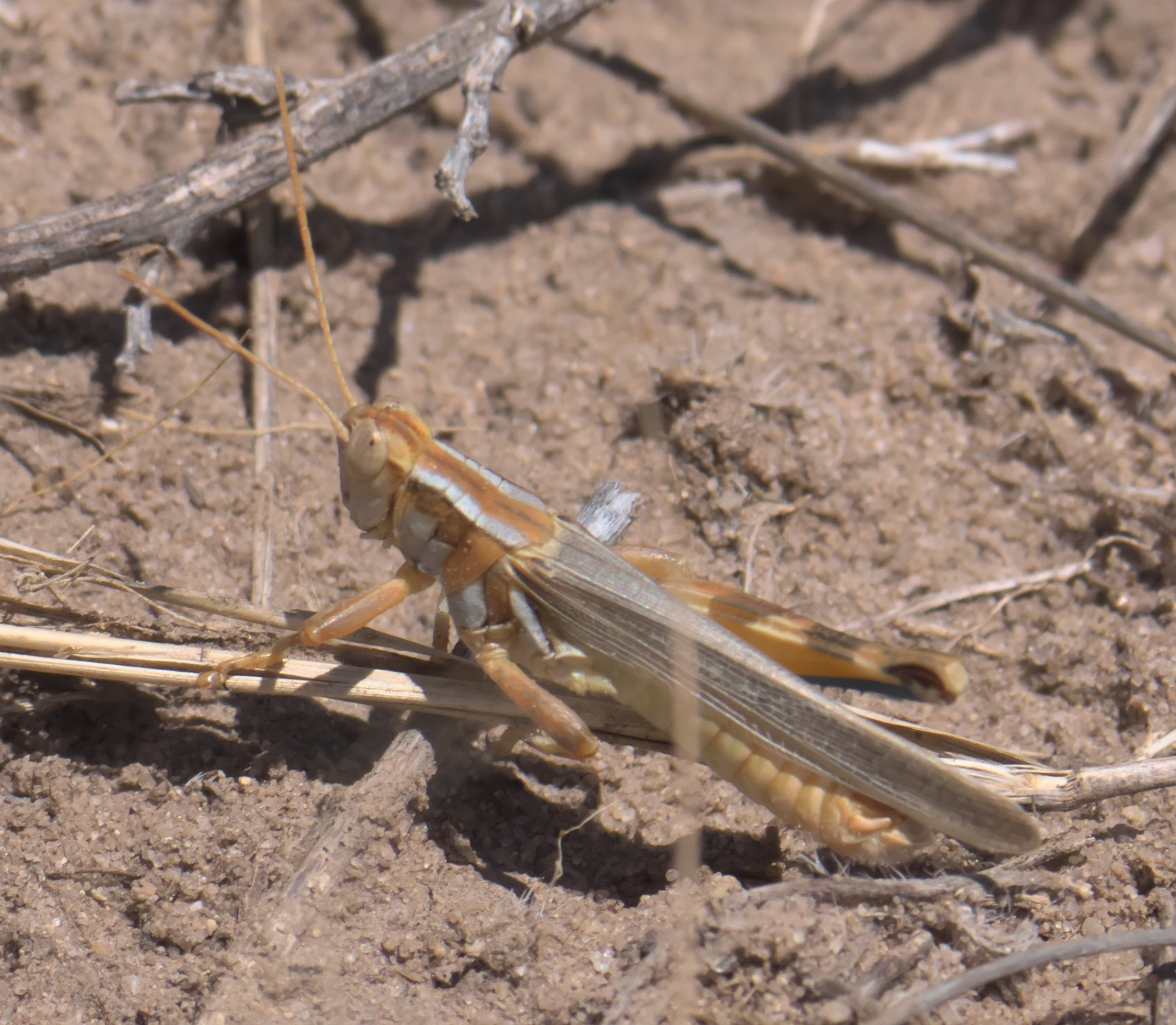

Scientific classification
- Kingdom: Animalia
- Phylum: Arthropoda
- Clade: Pancrustacea
- Class: Insecta
- Order: Orthoptera
- Suborder: Caelifera
- Family: Acrididae
- Tribe: Melanoplini
- Genus: Melanoplus
- Species: M. flavidus

Binomial name
- Melanoplus flavidus Scudder, 1878

= Melanoplus flavidus =

Species of grasshopper

Melanoplus flavidus, known generally as yellowish spur-throat grasshopper, is a species of spur-throated grasshopper in the family Acrididae. Other common names include the blue-legged locust and blue-legged grasshopper. It is found in North America.

== Subspecies ==
These two subspecies belong to the species Melanoplus flavidus:

- Melanoplus flavidus elongatus^{b}
- Melanoplus flavidus favidus^{b}

Data sources: i = ITIS, c = Catalogue of Life, g = GBIF, b = Bugguide.net
