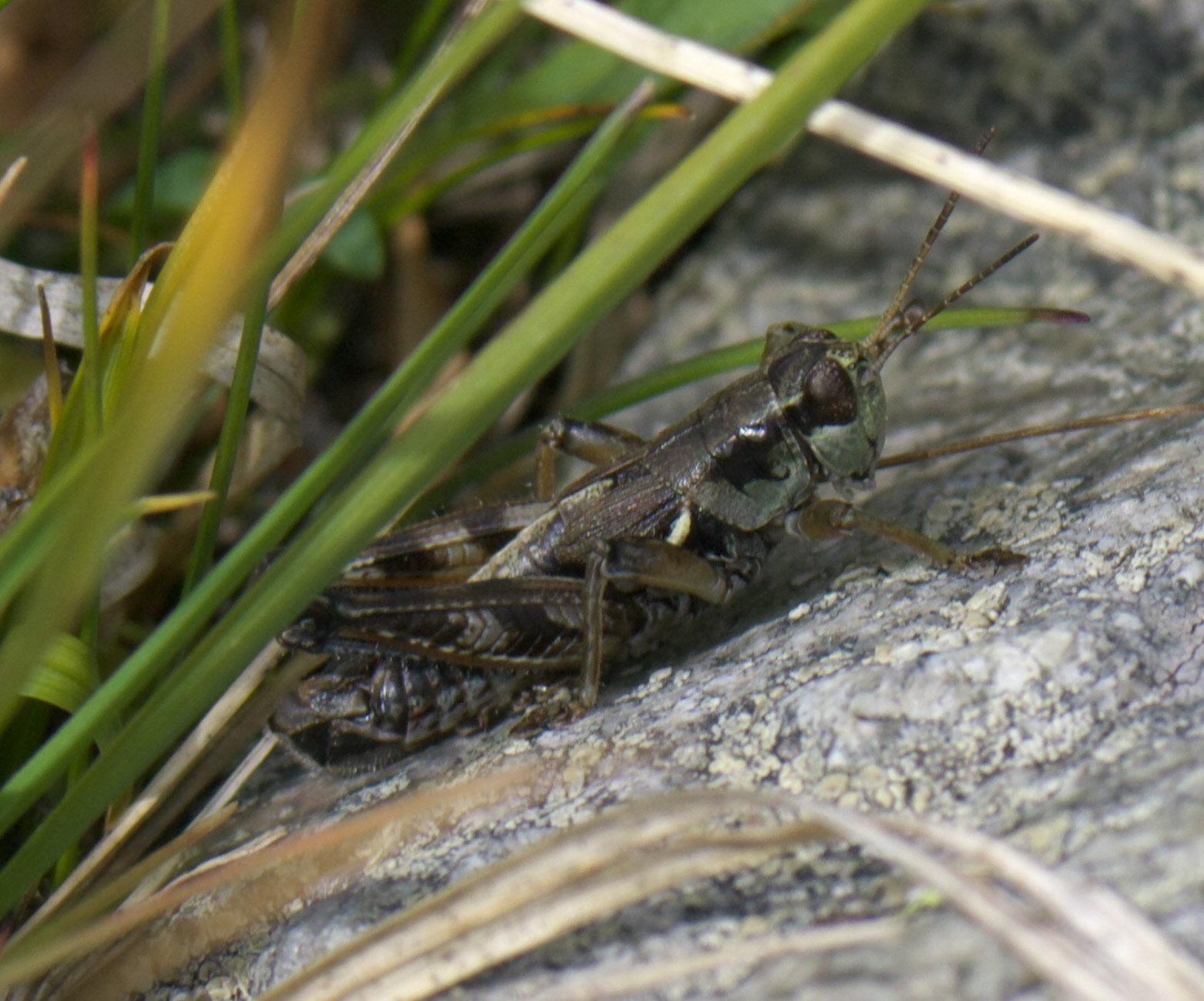

Scientific classification
- Kingdom: Animalia
- Phylum: Arthropoda
- Clade: Pancrustacea
- Class: Insecta
- Order: Orthoptera
- Suborder: Caelifera
- Family: Acrididae
- Tribe: Melanoplini
- Genus: Melanoplus
- Species: M. fasciatus

Binomial name
- Melanoplus fasciatus (Walker, 1870)

= Melanoplus fasciatus =

Species of grasshopper

Melanoplus fasciatus, known generally as huckleberry grasshopper, is a species of spur-throated grasshopper in the family Acrididae. Other common names include the huckleberry spur-throat grasshopper and huckleberry locust. It is found in North America.
