= Melanoplus furcatus =

Scientific classification
- Kingdom: Animalia
- Phylum: Arthropoda
- Clade: Pancrustacea
- Class: Insecta
- Order: Orthoptera
- Suborder: Caelifera
- Family: Acrididae
- Tribe: Melanoplini
- Genus: Melanoplus
- Species: M. furcatus

Binomial name
- Melanoplus furcatus Scudder, 1897

Species of grasshopper

Melanoplus furcatus, known generally as the larger fork-tail grasshopper or fork-tailed locust, is a species of spur-throated grasshopper in the family Acrididae. It is found in North America.
