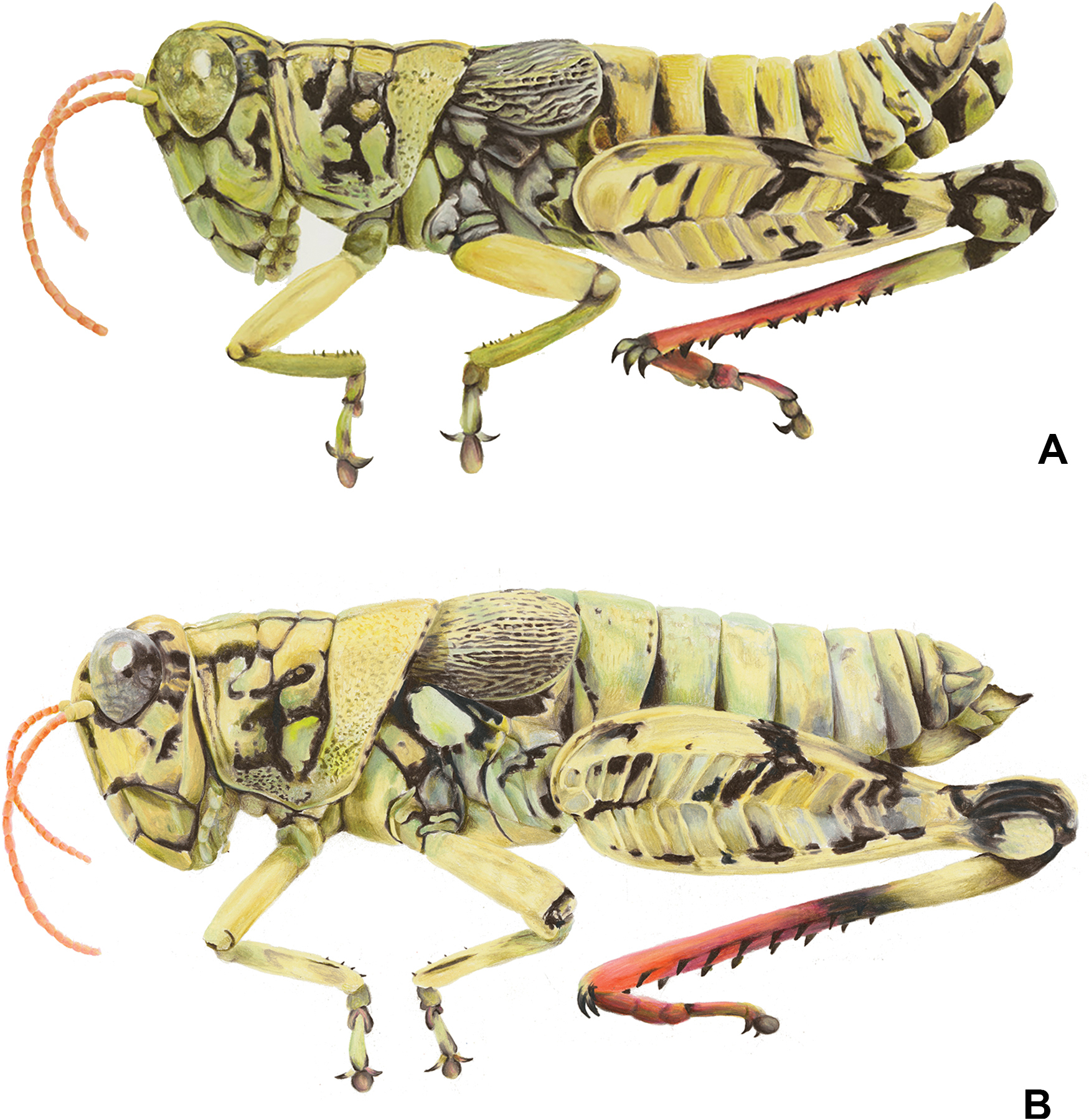

Scientific classification
- Kingdom: Animalia
- Phylum: Arthropoda
- Class: Insecta
- Order: Orthoptera
- Suborder: Caelifera
- Family: Acrididae
- Tribe: Melanoplini
- Genus: Agroecotettix; Bruner, 1908
- Species: A. modestus

Binomial name
- Agroecotettix modestus Bruner, 1908

= Agroecotettix =

Genus of grasshoppers

Agroecotettix is a genus of spur-throated grasshoppers in the family Acrididae. There is at least one described species in Agroecotettix, A. modestus.
