= Melanoplus pygmaeus =

Scientific classification
- Kingdom: Animalia
- Phylum: Arthropoda
- Clade: Pancrustacea
- Class: Insecta
- Order: Orthoptera
- Suborder: Caelifera
- Family: Acrididae
- Tribe: Melanoplini
- Genus: Melanoplus
- Species: M. pygmaeus

Binomial name
- Melanoplus pygmaeus Davis, 1915

Species of grasshopper

Melanoplus pygmaeus, known generally as pygmy short-wing grasshopper, is a species of spur-throated grasshopper in the family Acrididae. Other common names include the pygmy sandhill grasshopper and pygmy locust. It is found in North America.
