= Melanoplus nigrescens =

Scientific classification
- Kingdom: Animalia
- Phylum: Arthropoda
- Clade: Pancrustacea
- Class: Insecta
- Order: Orthoptera
- Suborder: Caelifera
- Family: Acrididae
- Tribe: Melanoplini
- Genus: Melanoplus
- Species: M. nigrescens

Binomial name
- Melanoplus nigrescens (Scudder, 1877)

Species of grasshopper

Melanoplus nigrescens, known generally as dark-sided grasshopper, is a species of spur-throated grasshopper in the family Acrididae. Other common names include the black-sided spur-throat grasshopper and black-sided locust. It is found in North America.
