= Melanoplus indicifer =

Scientific classification
- Kingdom: Animalia
- Phylum: Arthropoda
- Clade: Pancrustacea
- Class: Insecta
- Order: Orthoptera
- Suborder: Caelifera
- Family: Acrididae
- Tribe: Melanoplini
- Genus: Melanoplus
- Species: M. indicifer

Binomial name
- Melanoplus indicifer Hubbell, 1933

Synonyms
- Melanoplus insignis

Species of grasshopper

Melanoplus indicifer, known generally as the spinecercus short-wing grasshopper or east coast scrub grasshopper, is a species of spur-throated grasshopper in the family Acrididae. It is endemic to Florida scrubs on the Atlantic Coastal Ridge in Palm Beach County, Florida, United States.
