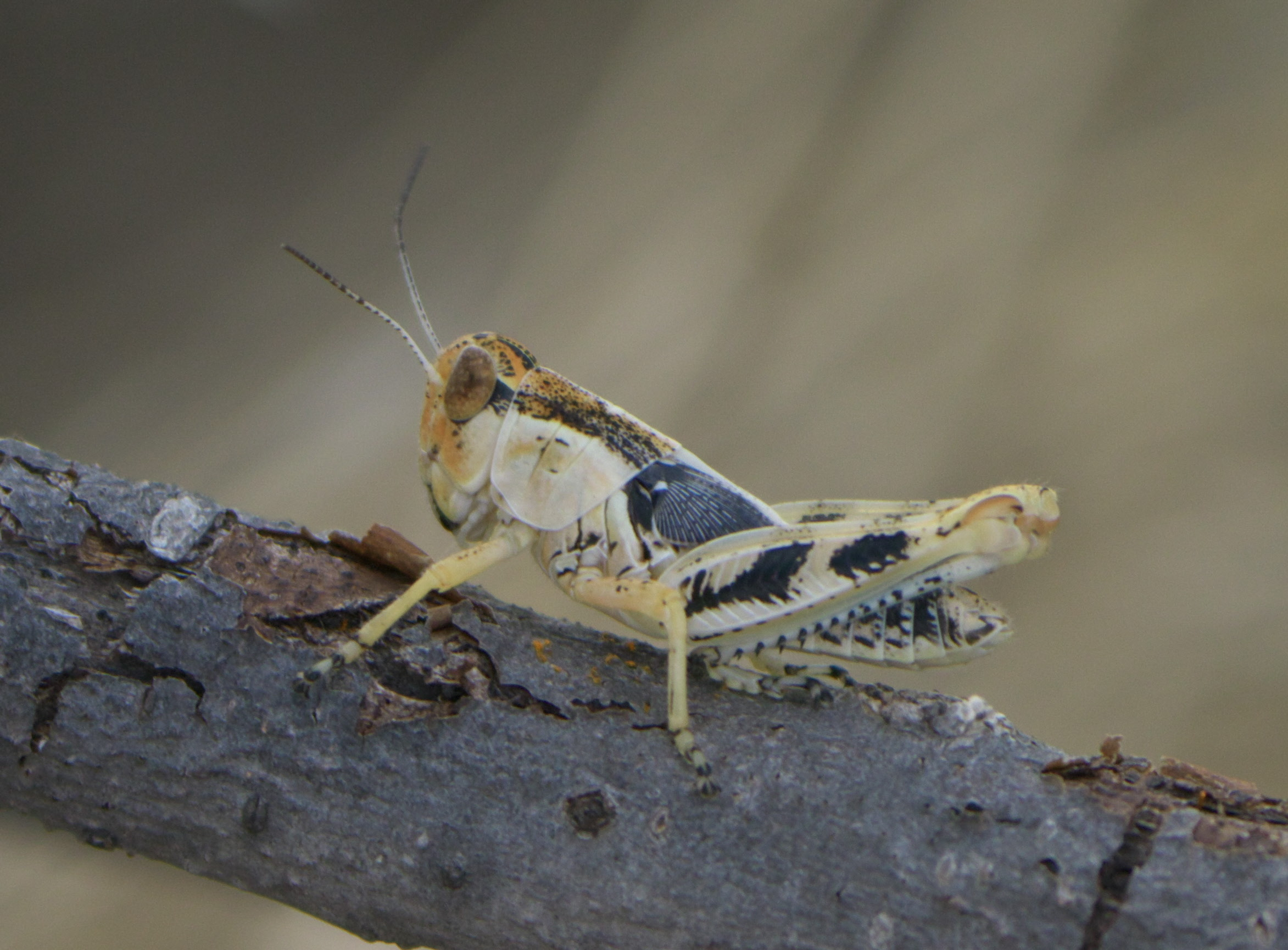

Scientific classification
- Kingdom: Animalia
- Phylum: Arthropoda
- Clade: Pancrustacea
- Class: Insecta
- Order: Orthoptera
- Suborder: Caelifera
- Family: Acrididae
- Tribe: Melanoplini
- Genus: Melanoplus
- Species: M. ponderosus

Binomial name
- Melanoplus ponderosus (Scudder, 1875)

= Melanoplus ponderosus =

Species of grasshopper

Melanoplus ponderosus, the ponderous spur-throat grasshopper, is a species of spur-throated grasshopper in the family Acrididae. It is found in North America.

== Subspecies ==
These two subspecies belong to the species Melanoplus ponderosus:

- Melanoplus ponderosus ponderosus (Scudder, 1875)^{i}
- Melanoplus ponderosus viola Thomas, 1876^{i}

Data sources: i = ITIS, c = Catalogue of Life, g = GBIF, b = Bugguide.net
