= Melanoplus texanus =

Scientific classification
- Kingdom: Animalia
- Phylum: Arthropoda
- Clade: Pancrustacea
- Class: Insecta
- Order: Orthoptera
- Suborder: Caelifera
- Family: Acrididae
- Tribe: Melanoplini
- Genus: Melanoplus
- Species: M. texanus

Binomial name
- Melanoplus texanus (Scudder, 1878)

Species of grasshopper

Melanoplus texanus, the Texas spur-throat grasshopper, is a species of spur-throated grasshopper in the family Acrididae. It is found in North America.
