= Melanoplus islandicus =

Scientific classification
- Kingdom: Animalia
- Phylum: Arthropoda
- Clade: Pancrustacea
- Class: Insecta
- Order: Orthoptera
- Suborder: Caelifera
- Family: Acrididae
- Tribe: Melanoplini
- Genus: Melanoplus
- Species: M. islandicus

Binomial name
- Melanoplus islandicus Blatchley, 1898

Species of grasshopper

Melanoplus islandicus, known generally as island short-wing grasshopper, is a species of spur-throated grasshopper in the family Acrididae. Other common names include the forest locust and island locust. It is found in North America.

It is found primarily in the coastal regions of Alaska and Canada. It is a species of concern for the state, as its populations have decreased over the years due to various factors, including habitat loss and introduction of invasive species.

Conservation efforts are underway to protect and preserve the Isle Royale grasshopper. In 2003, the United States Fish and Wildlife Service proposed the species for listing under the Endangered Species Act, but it has not yet been listed. People are working to protect the Isle Royale grasshopper by controlling the number of non-native species on the island and fixing its habitats.
