= Melanoplus franciscanus =

Scientific classification
- Kingdom: Animalia
- Phylum: Arthropoda
- Clade: Pancrustacea
- Class: Insecta
- Order: Orthoptera
- Suborder: Caelifera
- Family: Acrididae
- Tribe: Melanoplini
- Genus: Melanoplus
- Species: M. franciscanus

Binomial name
- Melanoplus franciscanus Scudder, 1898

Species of grasshopper

Melanoplus franciscanus, the San Francisco short-wing grasshopper, is a species of spur-throated grasshopper in the family Acrididae. It is found in the American Southwest, in the Guadalupe Mountains of Texas and from the San Mateo Mountains of New Mexico to the San Francisco Peaks of Arizona. .
