= Melanoplus puer =

Scientific classification
- Kingdom: Animalia
- Phylum: Arthropoda
- Clade: Pancrustacea
- Class: Insecta
- Order: Orthoptera
- Suborder: Caelifera
- Family: Acrididae
- Tribe: Melanoplini
- Genus: Melanoplus
- Species: M. puer

Binomial name
- Melanoplus puer (Scudder, 1878)

Species of grasshopper

Melanoplus puer, known generally as least short-wing grasshopper, is a species of spur-throated grasshopper in the family Acrididae. Other common names include the Florida spur-throat grasshopper and least short-winged locust. It is found in North America.
