= Eotettix =

Scientific classification
- Kingdom: Animalia
- Phylum: Arthropoda
- Clade: Pancrustacea
- Class: Insecta
- Order: Orthoptera
- Suborder: Caelifera
- Family: Acrididae
- Tribe: Melanoplini
- Genus: Eotettix; Scudder, 1897

Genus of grasshoppers

Eotettix is a genus of spur-throated grasshoppers in the family Acrididae. There are about 6 described species in Eotettix.

== Species ==
- E. davisi Hebard, 1918
- E. hebardi Rehn, 1906
- E. palustris Morse, 1904 (little swamp grasshopper)
- E. pusillus Morse, 1904 (little eastern grasshopper)
- E. quercicola Hebard, 1918
- E. signatus Scudder, 1897 (handsome Florida grasshopper)
