= Melanoplus oregonensis =

Scientific classification
- Kingdom: Animalia
- Phylum: Arthropoda
- Clade: Pancrustacea
- Class: Insecta
- Order: Orthoptera
- Suborder: Caelifera
- Family: Acrididae
- Tribe: Melanoplini
- Genus: Melanoplus
- Species: M. oregonensis

Binomial name
- Melanoplus oregonensis (Thomas, 1876)

Species of grasshopper

Melanoplus oregonensis, the oregon short-wing grasshopper, is a species of spur-throated grasshopper in the family Acrididae. It is found in North America.

== Subspecies ==
These two subspecies belong to the species Melanoplus oregonensis:

- Melanoplus oregonensis oregonensis (Thomas, 1876)^{i}
- Melanoplus oregonensis triangularis Hebard, 1928^{i}

Data sources: i = ITIS, c = Catalogue of Life, g = GBIF, b = Bugguide.net
