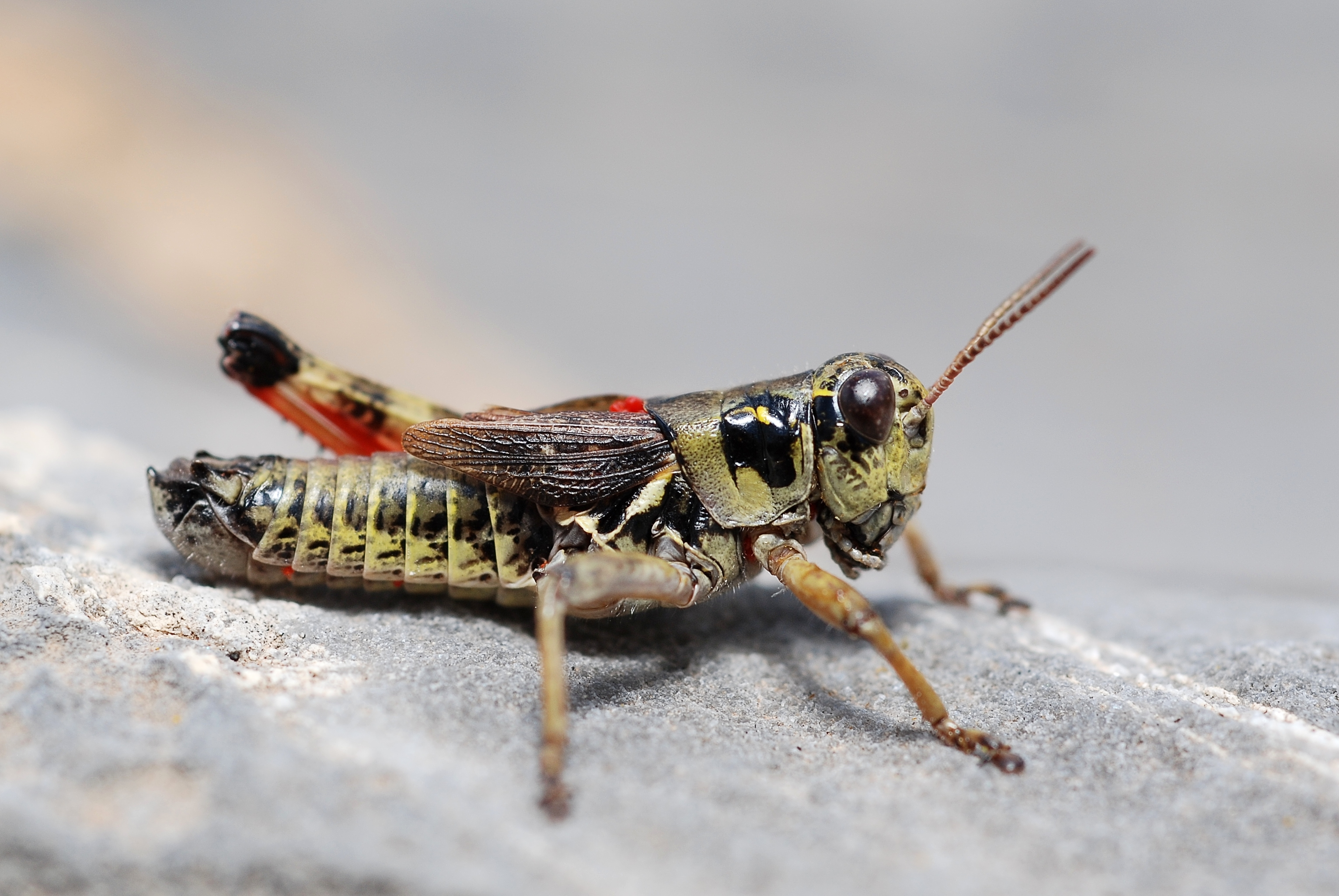

Scientific classification
- Kingdom: Animalia
- Phylum: Arthropoda
- Clade: Pancrustacea
- Class: Insecta
- Order: Orthoptera
- Suborder: Caelifera
- Family: Acrididae
- Genus: Melanoplus
- Species: M. frigidus

Binomial name
- Melanoplus frigidus (Boheman, 1846)

= Melanoplus frigidus =

Species of grasshopper

Melanoplus frigidus, known generally as the Nordic mountain grasshopper or narrow-winged locust, is a species of spur-throated grasshopper in the family Acrididae. It is found in Europe and Northern Asia (excluding China).

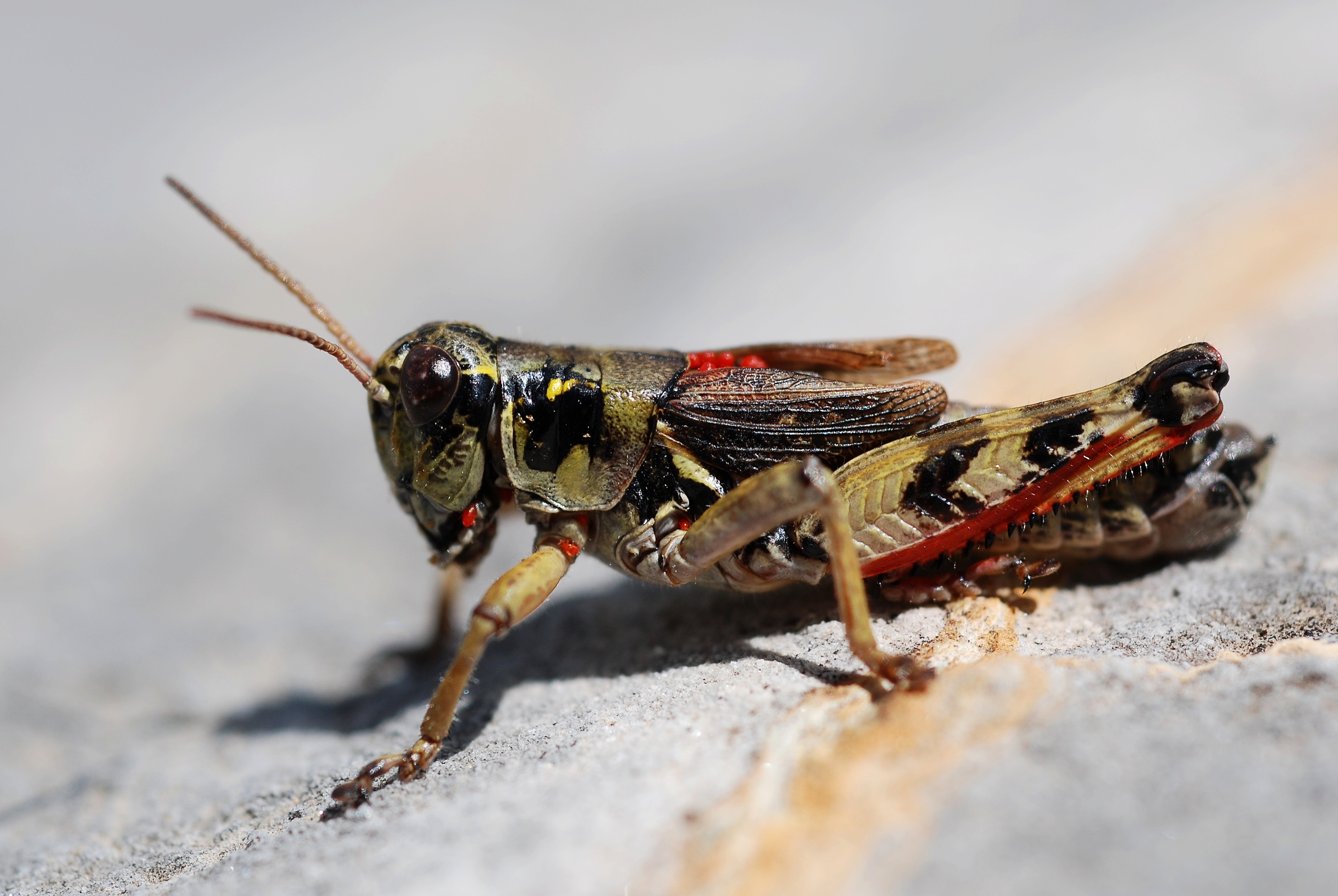
Nordic mountain grasshopper, Melanoplus frigidus

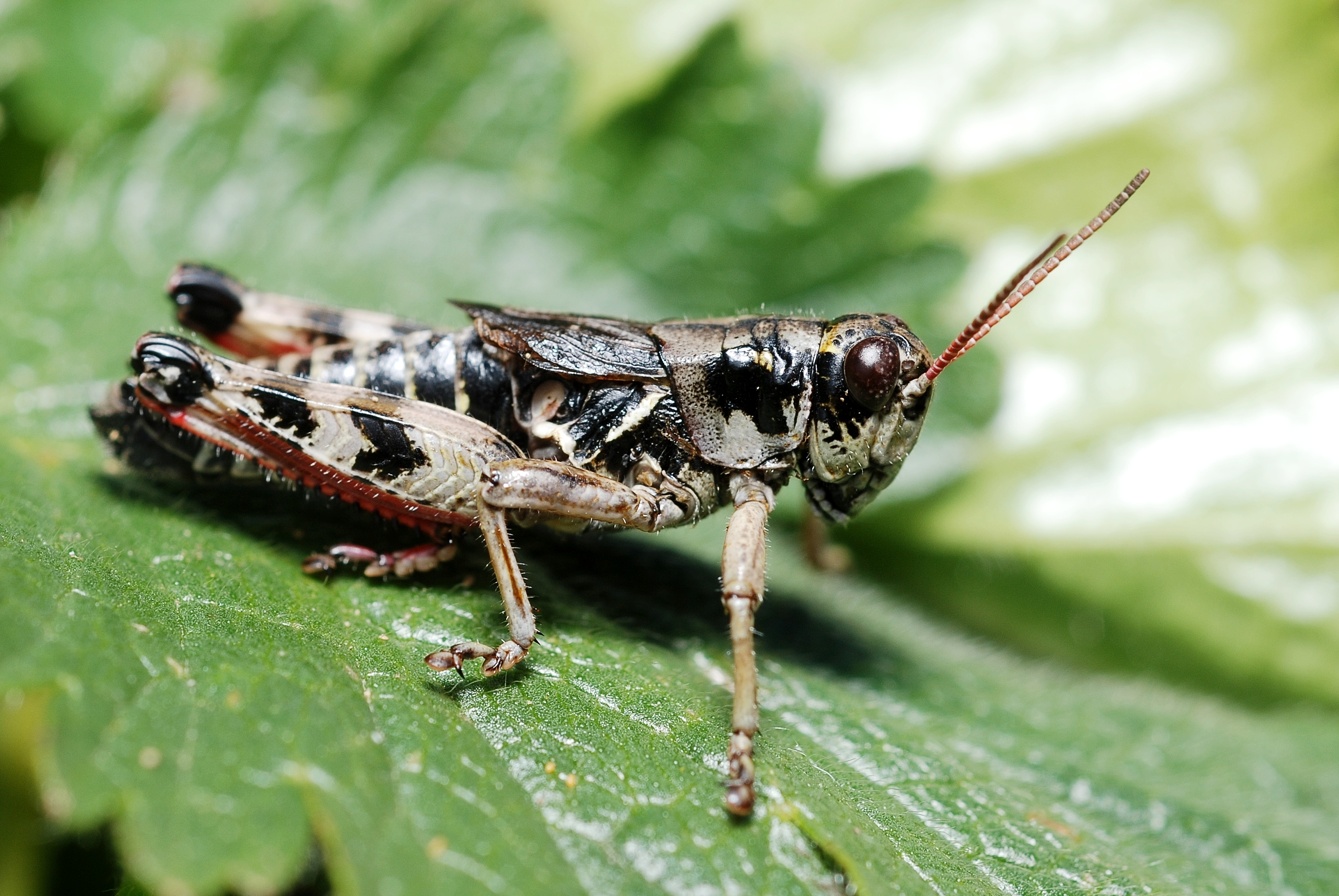
Nordic mountain grasshopper, Melanoplus frigidus
