= Melanoplus huroni =

Scientific classification
- Kingdom: Animalia
- Phylum: Arthropoda
- Clade: Pancrustacea
- Class: Insecta
- Order: Orthoptera
- Suborder: Caelifera
- Family: Acrididae
- Genus: Melanoplus
- Species: M. huroni

Binomial name
- Melanoplus huroni Blatchley, 1898

Species of grasshopper

Melanoplus huroni, known generally as the Huron short-wing grasshopper or Huron short-winged locust, is a species of spur-throated grasshopper in the family Acrididae. It is found in North America.
