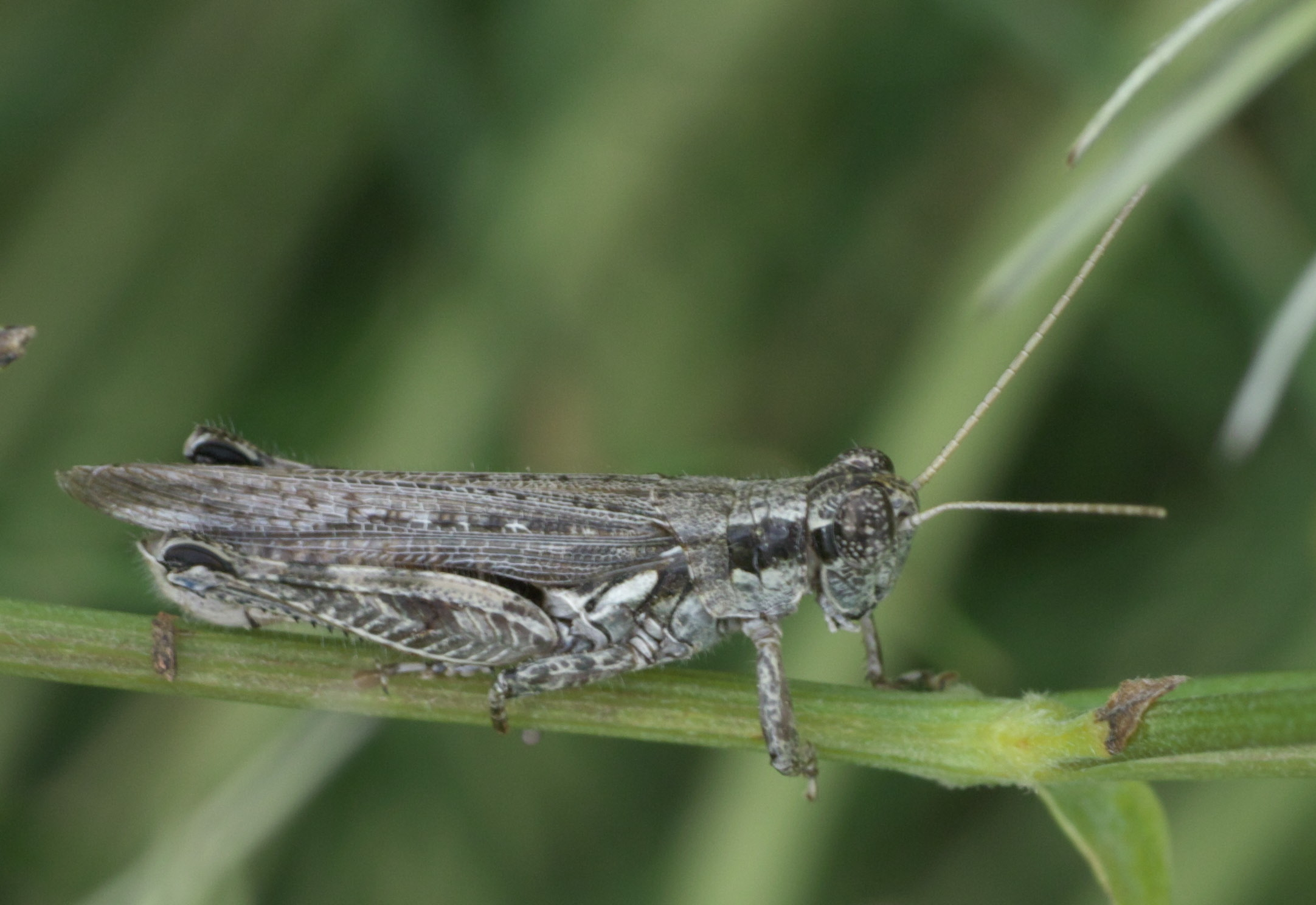

Scientific classification
- Kingdom: Animalia
- Phylum: Arthropoda
- Clade: Pancrustacea
- Class: Insecta
- Order: Orthoptera
- Suborder: Caelifera
- Family: Acrididae
- Genus: Melanoplus
- Species: M. complanatipes

Binomial name
- Melanoplus complanatipes Scudder, 1897

= Melanoplus complanatipes =

Species of grasshopper

Melanoplus complanatipes, the western sagebrush grasshopper, is a species of spur-throated grasshopper in the family Acrididae. It is found in Central America and North America.

== Subspecies ==
- Melanoplus complanatipes canonicus Scudder, 1897
- Melanoplus complanatipes complanatipes Scudder, 1897
