= Albert Pitts Morse =

American entomologist

Albert Pitts Morse (February 10, 1863 – April 29, 1936) was an American entomologist who specialized in the Orthoptera of North America.

Morse was born to Leonard Townsend of Sherborn, Massachusetts and Phebe Adaline Knapp. His paternal ancestors included Samuel Morse of Dedham. He went to local schools and graduated from Sawin Academy in 1879. He took an interest in the natural world, influenced by naturalists like Amory L. Babcock, Edgar J. Smith and William Edwards. He farmed for a while and after 1888 he joined Wellesley College as an assistant in the zoology department with which he remained associated until 1933. He attended a summer school in entomology at Woods Hole under Professor J.H. Comstock and took an interest in the Orthoptera of New England. He made collection trips to the Pacific Coast, encouraged by S.H. Scudder, and returned with thousands of specimens from which several new species were described. He conducted field courses for biology teachers around 1901 and he served as a research assistant at the Carnegie Institution, Washington in 1903 and 1905. In 1911, he became a curator in charge of the insects in the Peabody Museum in Salem and worked until 1926.

He was married to Annie McGill of Dover from 1893 and they had two children. Morse died in Wellesley after three years of poor health.
