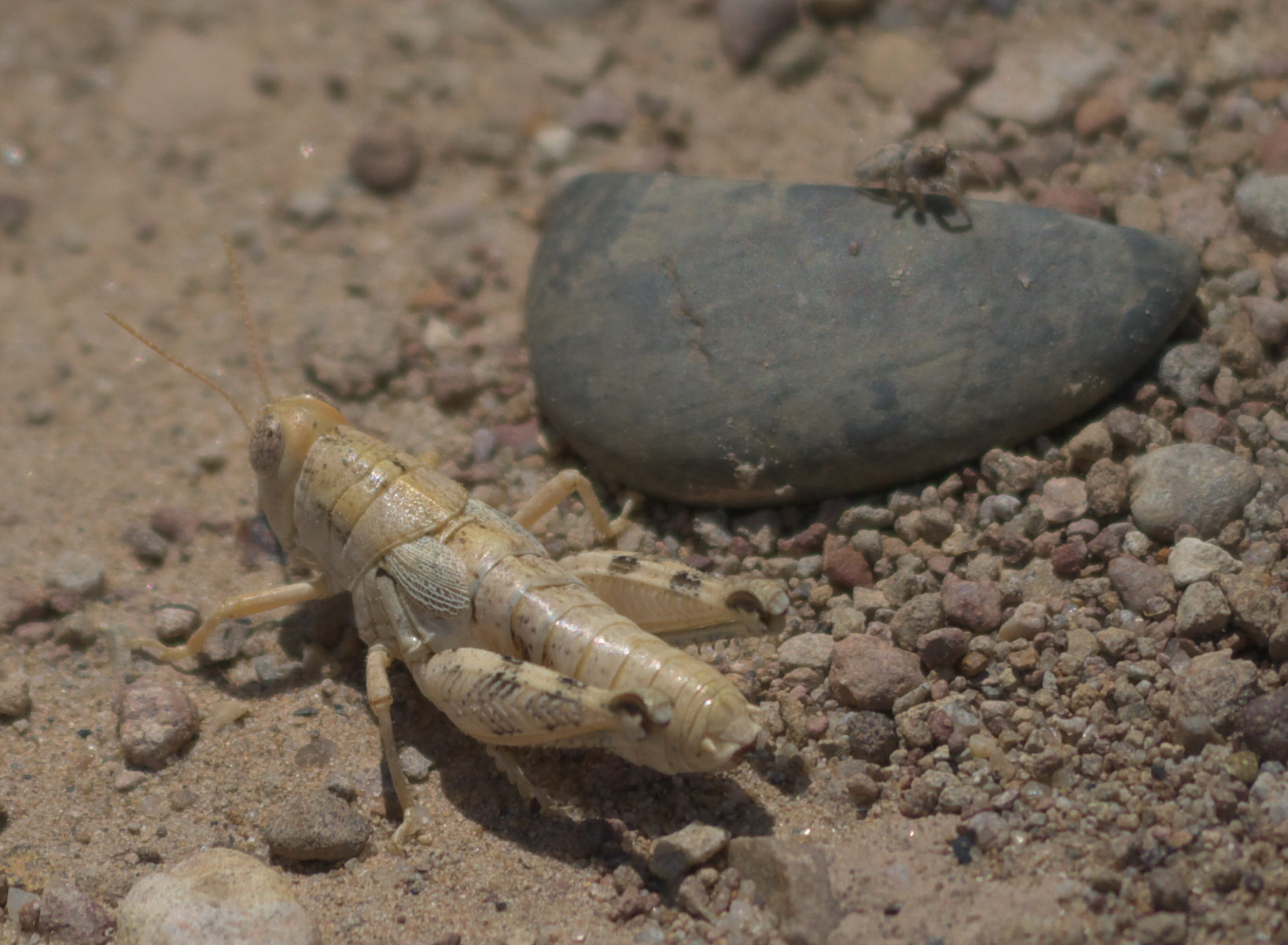
- Aeoloplides chenopodii

Scientific classification
- Kingdom: Animalia
- Phylum: Arthropoda
- Clade: Pancrustacea
- Class: Insecta
- Order: Orthoptera
- Suborder: Caelifera
- Family: Acrididae
- Subfamily: Melanoplinae
- Tribe: Melanoplini; Scudder, 1897

= Melanoplini =

Tribe of grasshoppers

Melanoplini is a tribe of spur-throated grasshoppers in the family Acrididae. There are about 19 genera and more than 200 described species in Melanoplini, all in North America. Their biogeography shows that many species in the tribe have descendants from the Eocene epoch and Miocene epoch.

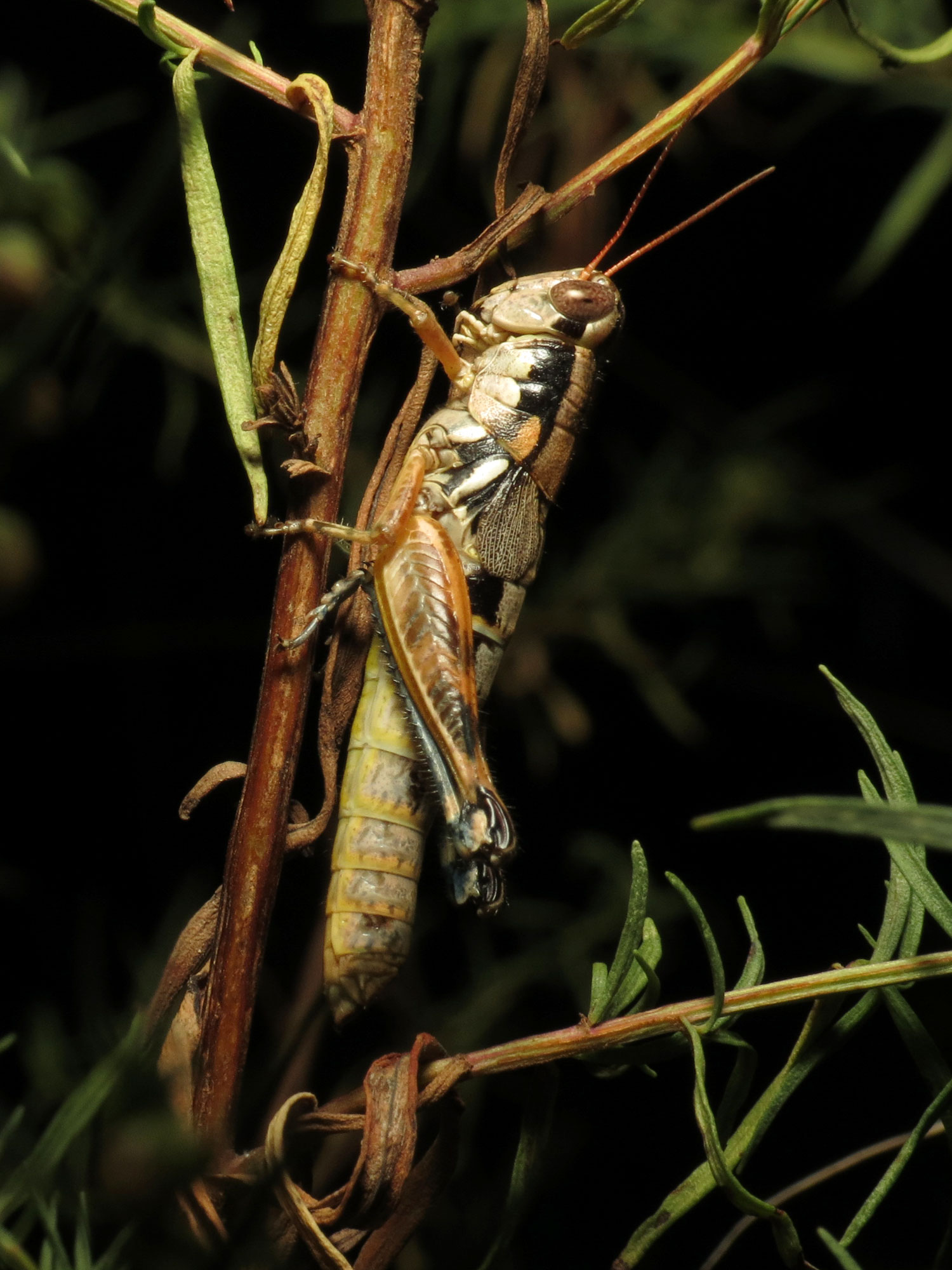
Phoetaliotes nebrascensis

== Genera ==
These 19 genera belong to the tribe Melanoplini:

- Aeoloplides Caudell, 1916^{i c g b}
- Agroecotettix Bruner, 1908^{i c g b}
- Aptenopedes Scudder, 1878^{i c g b}
- Cephalotettix Scudder, 1897^{c g}
- Chloroplus Hebard, 1918^{i c g b}
- Eotettix Scudder, 1897^{i c g b}
- Floridacris Otte, 2014^{c g}
- Floritettix Otte, 2014^{c g}
- Hesperotettix Scudder, 1876^{i c g b}
- Hypochlora Brunner von Wattenwyl, 1893^{i c g b}
- Melanoplus Stål, 1873^{i c g b}
- Necaxacris Roberts, 1939^{c g}
- Netrosoma Scudder, 1897^{c g b}
- Oedaleonotus Scudder, 1897^{i c g b}
- Paroxya Scudder, 1877^{i c g b}
- Phaedrotettix Scudder, 1897^{i c g b}
- Philocleon Scudder, 1897^{c g b}
- Phoetaliotes Scudder, 1897^{i c g b}
- Sinaloa Scudder, 1897^{i c g}

Data sources: i = ITIS, c = Catalogue of Life, g = GBIF, b = Bugguide.net
