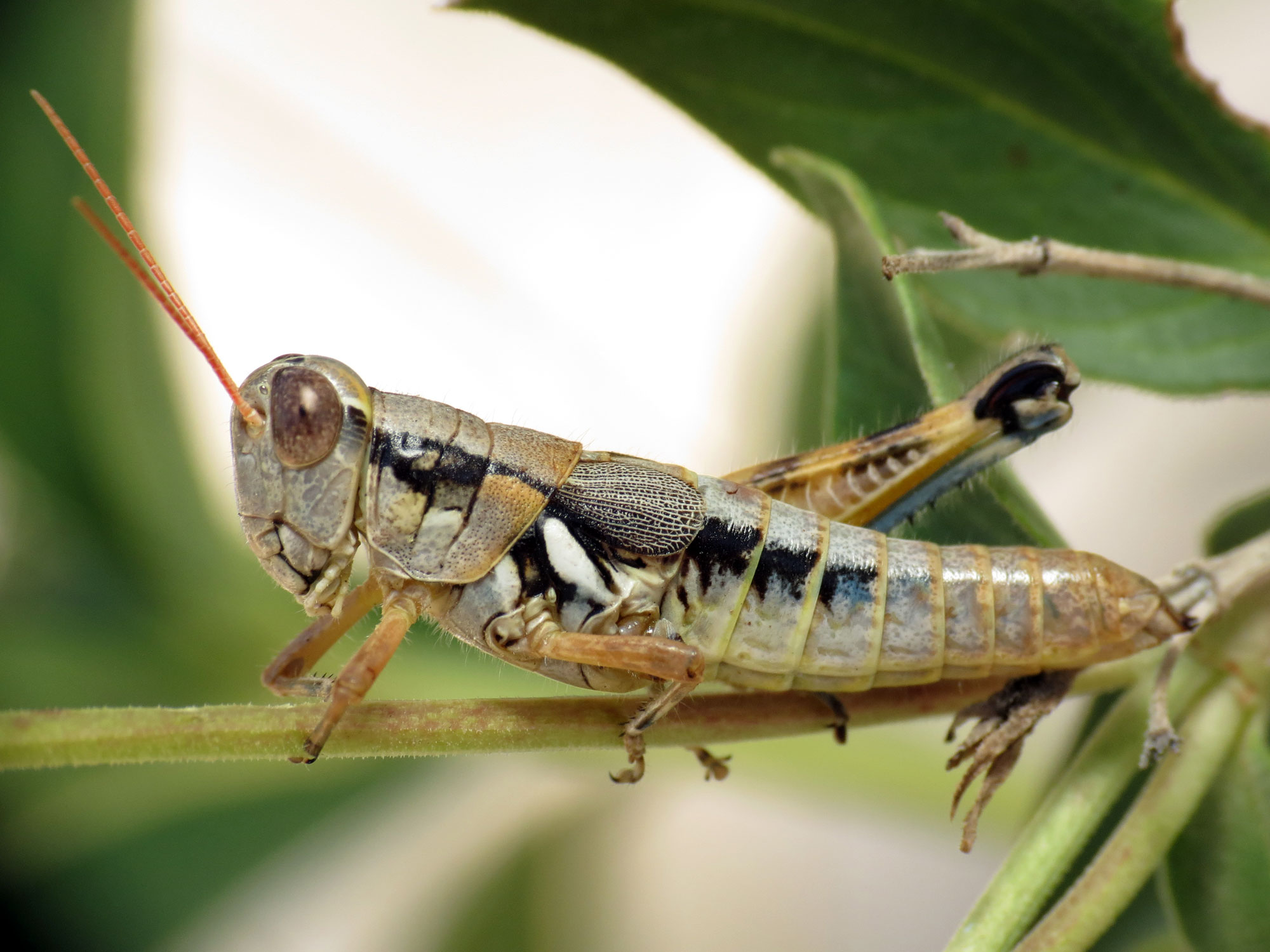
- Phoetaliotes nebrascensis, large-headed grasshopper, Arizona, USA

Scientific classification
- Kingdom: Animalia
- Phylum: Arthropoda
- Clade: Pancrustacea
- Class: Insecta
- Order: Orthoptera
- Suborder: Caelifera
- Family: Acrididae
- Subfamily: Melanoplinae
- Tribe: Melanoplini
- Genus: Phoetaliotes
- Species: P. nebrascensis

Binomial name
- Phoetaliotes nebrascensis (Thomas, 1872)

= Phoetaliotes nebrascensis =

Species of grasshopper

Phoetaliotes nebrascensis, the large-headed grasshopper, is a species of spur-throated grasshopper in the family Acrididae. It is found in North America.
