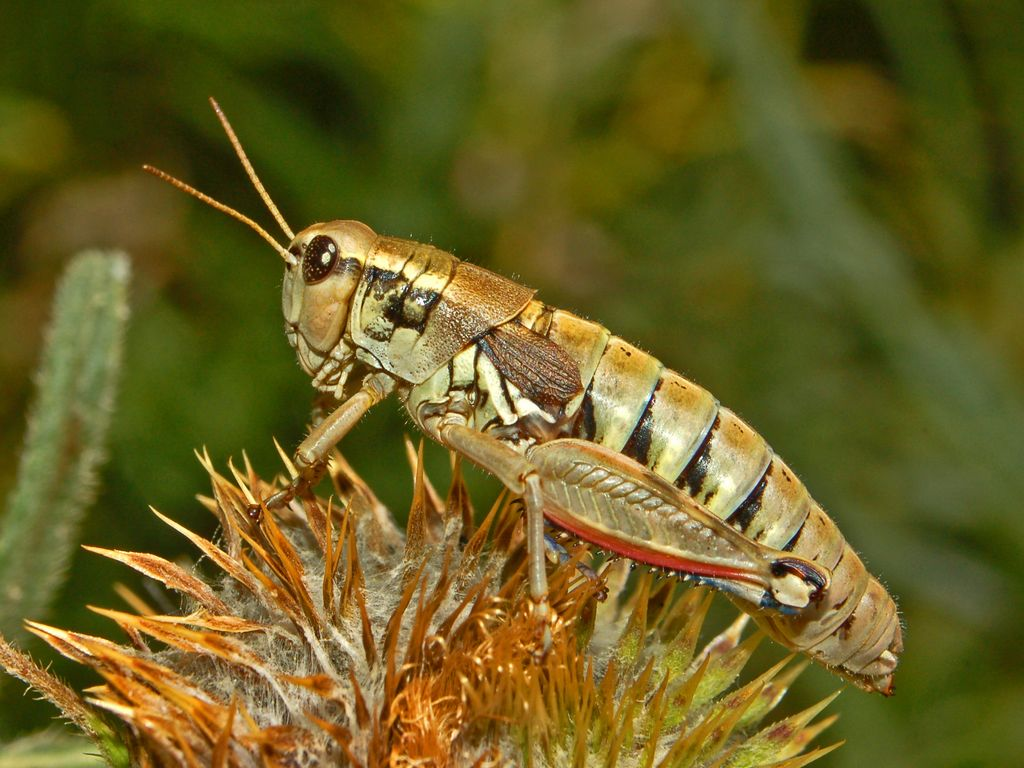
- Podisma pedestris, adult female

Scientific classification
- Kingdom: Animalia
- Phylum: Arthropoda
- Clade: Pancrustacea
- Class: Insecta
- Order: Orthoptera
- Suborder: Caelifera
- Family: Acrididae
- Subfamily: Melanoplinae
- Tribe: Podismini
- Genus: Podisma
- Species: P. pedestris

Binomial name
- Podisma pedestris (Linnaeus, 1758)

Synonyms
- Acridium apterum

= Podisma pedestris =

Species of grasshopper

Podisma pedestris is a species of 'short-horned grasshoppers' belonging to the family Acrididae subfamily Melanoplinae.

== Distribution ==
This small wingless grasshopper is found throughout most of Europe and the eastern Palearctic realm, extending to temperate mainland east Asia.

== Description ==
The adult males grow up to 17–25 millimetres (0.67–0.98 in) long, while the females reach 24–30 millimetres (0.94–1.18 in) of length. They can be encountered from mid June through October in dry meadows, in rocky slopes of mountains, alpine pastures and forest clearings. They feed on grasses and herbaceous plants. The females lay their eggs on the ground.

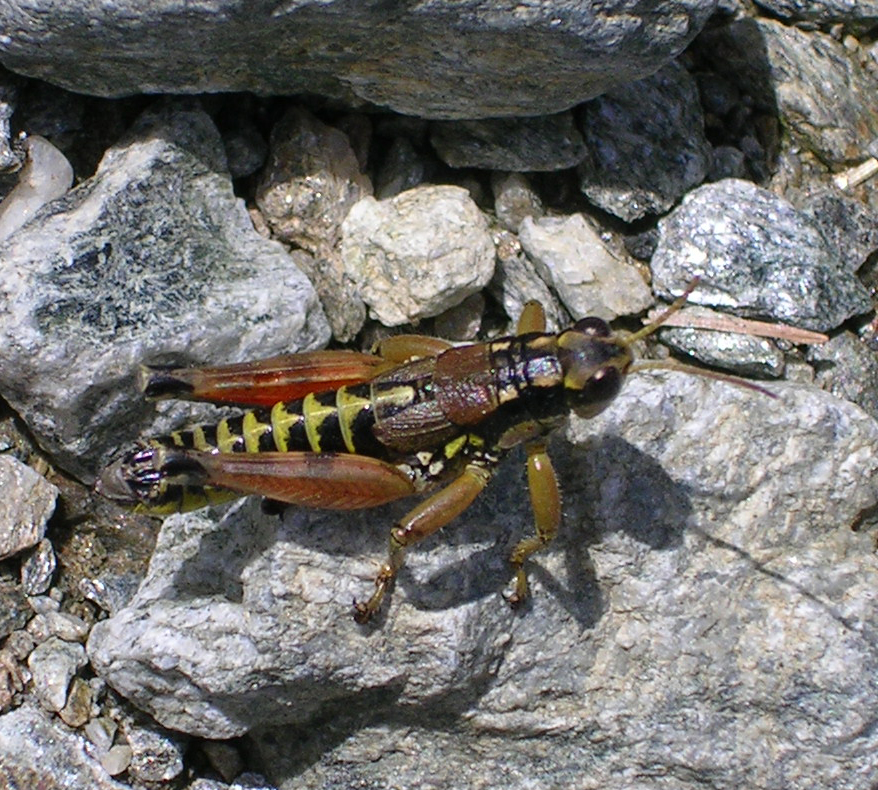
Podisma pedestris, male

The basic coloration of the body varies from dark-brownish to yellowish, with black and yellow trasversal stripes on the sides of the abdomen. The males have brighter and more intense colours and more extensive black markings than the females. A dark longitudinal stripe runs from the eye to pronotum. The femora of the hind legs are reddish, while tibiae are bluish with white spines.

In both sexes the vestigial wings are oval, very short and unfit to flight (brachyptery), resembling those of a nymph. This species sometimes has well-developed wings, enabling to fly.

== Subspecies ==
- Podisma pedestris var. caprai Salfi, 1935
- Podisma pedestris var. nadigi Harz, 1975
- Podisma pedestris var. pedestris (Linnaeus, 1758)
- Podisma pedestris var. sviridenkoi Dovnar-Zapolskii, 1927
