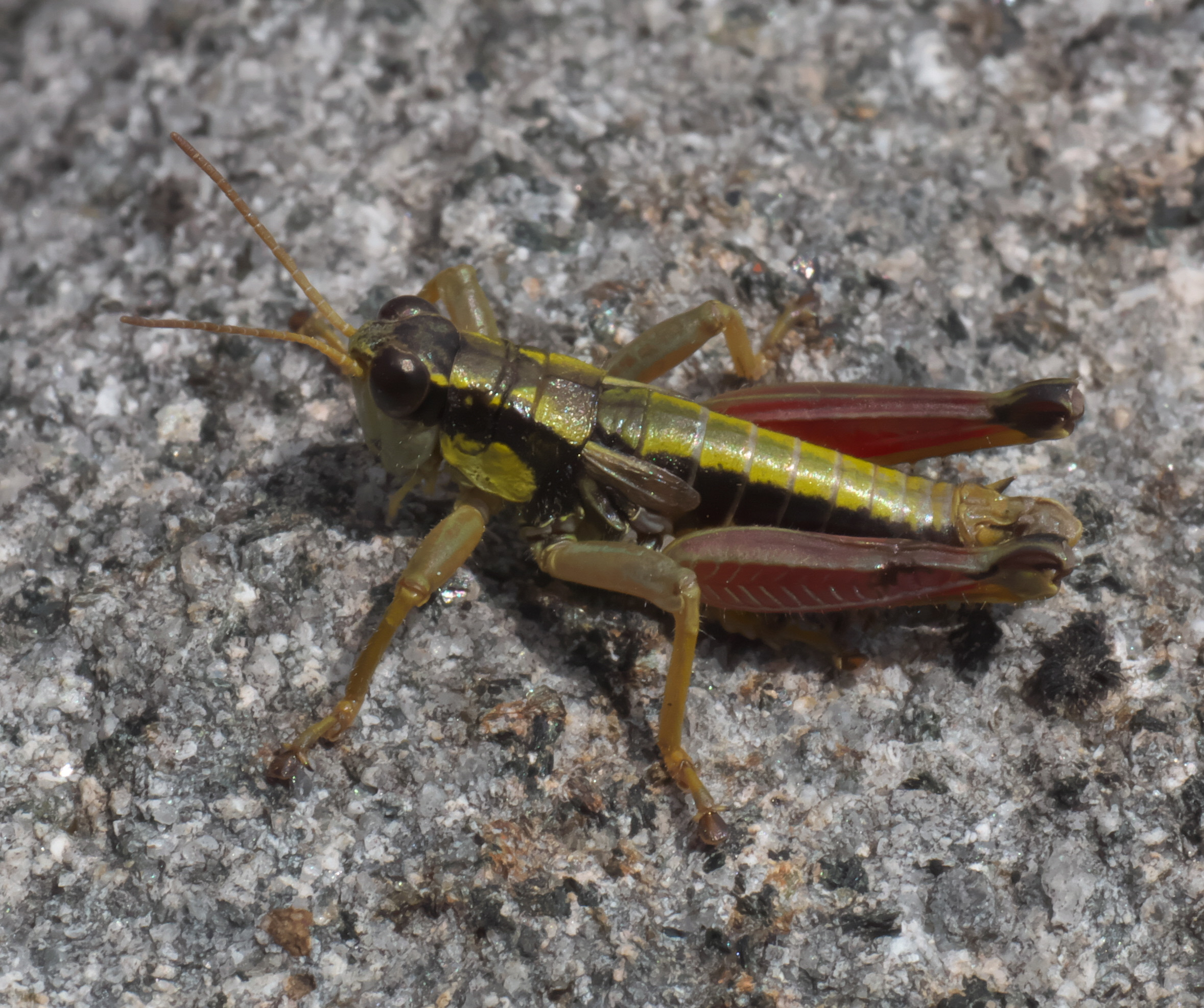
- Prumnacris rainierensis, cascade timberline grasshopper, Washington, USA

Scientific classification
- Kingdom: Animalia
- Phylum: Arthropoda
- Clade: Pancrustacea
- Class: Insecta
- Order: Orthoptera
- Suborder: Caelifera
- Family: Acrididae
- Subfamily: Melanoplinae
- Tribe: Podismini
- Genus: Prumnacris
- Species: P. rainierensis

Binomial name
- Prumnacris rainierensis (Caudell, 1907)

= Prumnacris rainierensis =

Species of grasshopper

Prumnacris rainierensis, the cascade timberline grasshopper, is a species of spur-throated grasshopper in the family Acrididae. It is found in the Pacific Northwest United States.
