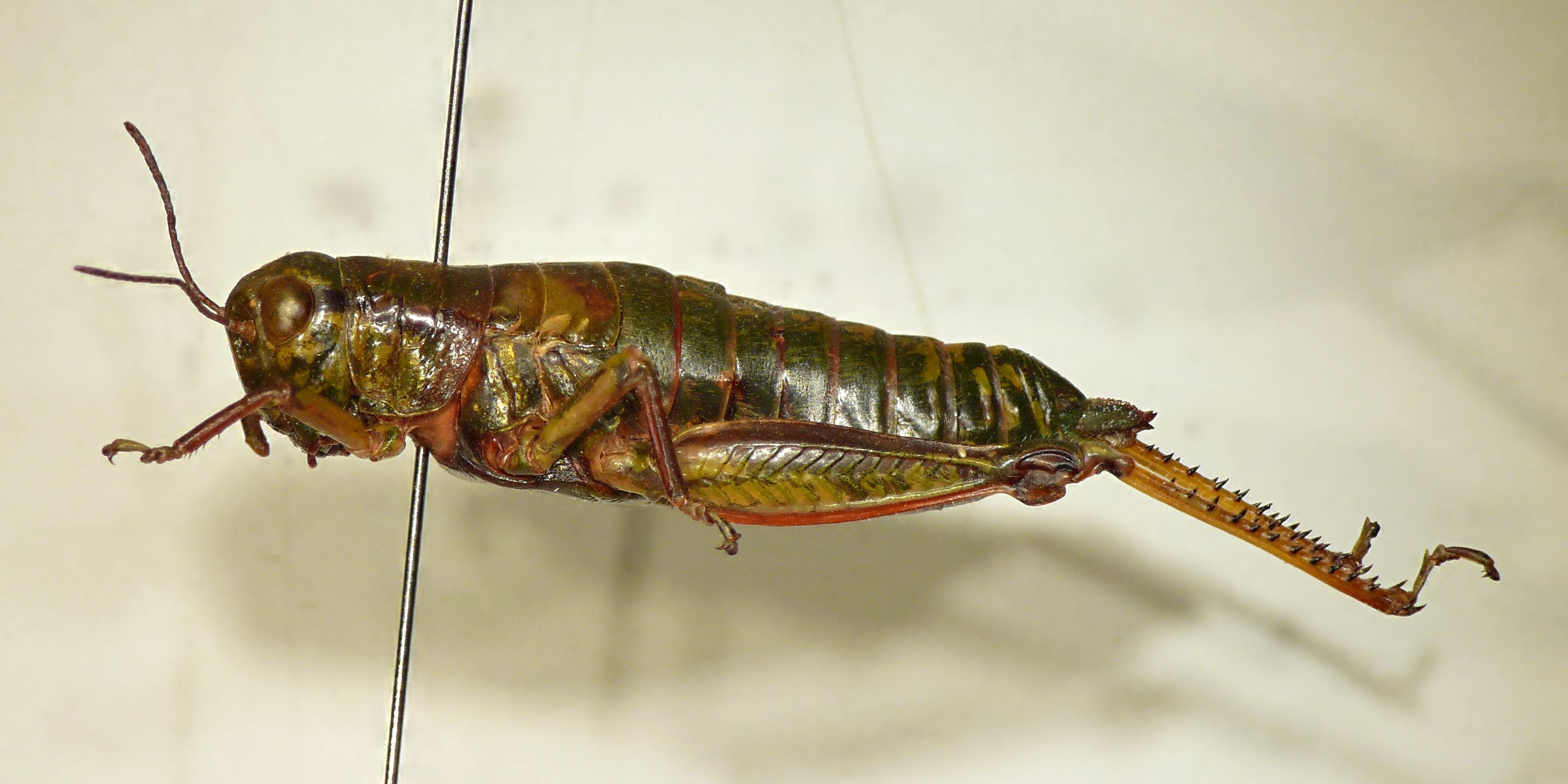
- Female Chortopodisma cobellii

Scientific classification
- Kingdom: Animalia
- Phylum: Arthropoda
- Clade: Pancrustacea
- Class: Insecta
- Order: Orthoptera
- Suborder: Caelifera
- Family: Acrididae
- Tribe: Podismini
- Genus: Chortopodisma; Ramme, 1951
- Species: C. cobellii

Binomial name
- Chortopodisma cobellii (Krauss, 1883)

Synonyms
- Pezotettix cobellii Krauss (by monotypy and original designation)

= Chortopodisma =

Chortopodisma cobellii

Species of grasshopper

Chortopodisma is a monotypic genus of grasshopper in the tribe Podismini. Its only recognized species is Chortopodisma cobellii.

== Description ==
Chortopodisma cobellii is similar to Pseudoprumna baldensis, with a light green coloured body and a strong shortened dark band on its flanks (in contrast to other wingless mountain grasshoppers). This species is apterous and the hearing organ is vestigial.

== Distribution and mode of life ==
This species is endemic to the Italian Alps, where it may be called the "Veneto Mountain Grasshopper". It is only known from a small area around the Monte Pasubio in altitudes of 1,600–2,200 metres (5,200–7,200 ft). Adult specimens can be found from August to October.
