= Zubovskya banatica =

Conservation status
- Critically Endangered (IUCN 2.3)

Scientific classification
- Kingdom: Animalia
- Phylum: Arthropoda
- Clade: Pancrustacea
- Class: Insecta
- Order: Orthoptera
- Suborder: Caelifera
- Family: Acrididae
- Tribe: Podismini
- Genus: Zubovskya
- Species: Z. banatica

Binomial name
- Zubovskya banatica Kis, 1965

Species of grasshopper

Zubovskya banatica is a species of insect in family Acrididae. It is found in Hungary and Romania.
