= Agnostokasia =

Scientific classification
- Domain: Eukaryota
- Kingdom: Animalia
- Phylum: Arthropoda
- Class: Insecta
- Order: Orthoptera
- Suborder: Caelifera
- Family: Acrididae
- Tribe: Podismini
- Genus: Agnostokasia; Gurney & Rentz, 1964
- Species: A. sublima

Binomial name
- Agnostokasia sublima Gurney & Rentz, 1964

Genus of grasshoppers

Agnostokasia is a genus of spur-throated grasshoppers in the family Acrididae. There is at least one described species in Agnostokasia, A. sublima.
