= Zubovskya =

Scientific classification
- Kingdom: Animalia
- Phylum: Arthropoda
- Clade: Pancrustacea
- Class: Insecta
- Order: Orthoptera
- Suborder: Caelifera
- Family: Acrididae
- Subfamily: Melanoplinae
- Tribe: Podismini
- Genus: Zubovskya; Dovnar-Zapolskij, 1932

Synonyms
- Eozubobskya Jin, Yu & Xu, 2011; Eozubovskya Li & Yin, 2009; Zubovskia Bey-Bienko & Mistshenko, 1951

Genus of grasshoppers

External image
- Images at iNaturalist

Zubovskya is a genus of Palaearctic grasshoppers in the tribe Podismini and subtribe Miramellina, erected by D.P. Dovnar-Zapolskij in 1932. Species have a very disjointed distribution, with records (probably incomplete) from Romania, northern and eastern Russia, northern China, Korea and Japan.

== Species ==
The Orthoptera Species File lists:

1. Zubovskya banatica Kis, 1965
2. Zubovskya brachycercata Huang, 1987
3. Zubovskya dolichocercata Huang, 1987
4. Zubovskya eyouqiensis Li, Li & Yin, 2015
5. Zubovskya koeppeni (Zubovski, 1900): two subspecies:
  1. Z. koeppeni koeppeni (Zubovski, 1900)
  2. Z. koeppeni parvula (Ikonnikov, 1911) - type species (as Podisma parvula Ikonnikov)
6. Zubovskya koreana Mistshenko, 1952
7. Zubovskya mistshenkoi Storozhenko, 1980
8. Zubovskya mongolica Storozhenko, 1986
9. Zubovskya morii (Bey-Bienko, 1931)
10. Zubovskya planicaudata Zhang & Jin, 1985
11. Zubovskya weishanensis Zheng, Zhang & Ren, 1995
12. Zubovskya xiai Li, Li & Yin, 2015
