= Nisquallia =

Conservation status
- Critically Imperiled (NatureServe)

Scientific classification
- Kingdom: Animalia
- Phylum: Arthropoda
- Clade: Pancrustacea
- Class: Insecta
- Order: Orthoptera
- Suborder: Caelifera
- Family: Acrididae
- Subfamily: Melanoplinae
- Tribe: Podismini
- Genus: Nisquallia; Rehn, 1952
- Species: N. olympica

Binomial name
- Nisquallia olympica Rehn, 1952

Genus of grasshoppers

Nisquallia is a monotypic genus of spur-throated grasshoppers in the family Acrididae, containing a single described species, Nisquallia olympica, commonly known as the Olympic grasshopper. It is endemic to the Olympic Peninsula of Washington State, being found in alpine habitats; the type locality is Mt. Ellinor.
