= Pseudopodisma =

Scientific classification
- Kingdom: Animalia
- Phylum: Arthropoda
- Clade: Pancrustacea
- Class: Insecta
- Order: Orthoptera
- Suborder: Caelifera
- Family: Acrididae
- Subfamily: Melanoplinae
- Tribe: Podismini
- Genus: Pseudopodisma; Mistshenko, 1947

Genus of grasshoppers

External image
- Images at iNaturalist

Pseudopodisma is a genus of Palaearctic grasshoppers in the tribe Podismini and subtribe Podismina, erected by Mistshenko in 1947. Species have a (possibly incomplete) recorded distribution mostly from Italy and the Balkans.

== Species ==
The Orthoptera Species File lists:

1. Pseudopodisma fieberi (Scudder, 1897) - type species (as Podisma fieberi Scudder SH = P. fieberi fieberi, one of 4 subspecies)
2. Pseudopodisma nagyi Galvagni & Fontana, 1996
3. Pseudopodisma transilvanica Galvagni & Fontana, 1993
