= Oropodisma =

Scientific classification
- Kingdom: Animalia
- Phylum: Arthropoda
- Clade: Pancrustacea
- Class: Insecta
- Order: Orthoptera
- Suborder: Caelifera
- Family: Acrididae
- Subfamily: Melanoplinae
- Tribe: Podismini
- Genus: Oropodisma; Uvarov, 1942

Genus of grasshoppers

External image
- Images at iNaturalist

Oropodisma is a genus of Palaearctic grasshoppers in the tribe Podismini and subtribe Miramellina erected by Boris Uvarov in 1942. Species have a (possibly incomplete) recorded distribution from the Balkans through to the Bosphorus.

== Species ==
The Orthoptera Species File lists:

1. Oropodisma chelmosi Uvarov, 1942
2. Oropodisma erymanthosi Willemse, 1971
3. Oropodisma karavica La Greca & Messina, 1977
4. Oropodisma kyllinii Willemse, 1971
5. Oropodisma lagrecai Willemse, 1979
6. Oropodisma macedonica Ramme, 1951
7. Oropodisma parnassica (Scudder, 1897) - type species (as Podisma parnassica Scudder SH)
8. Oropodisma taygetosi Willemse, 1972
9. Oropodisma tymphrestosi Willemse, 1972
10. Oropodisma willemsei La Greca & Messina, 1977
