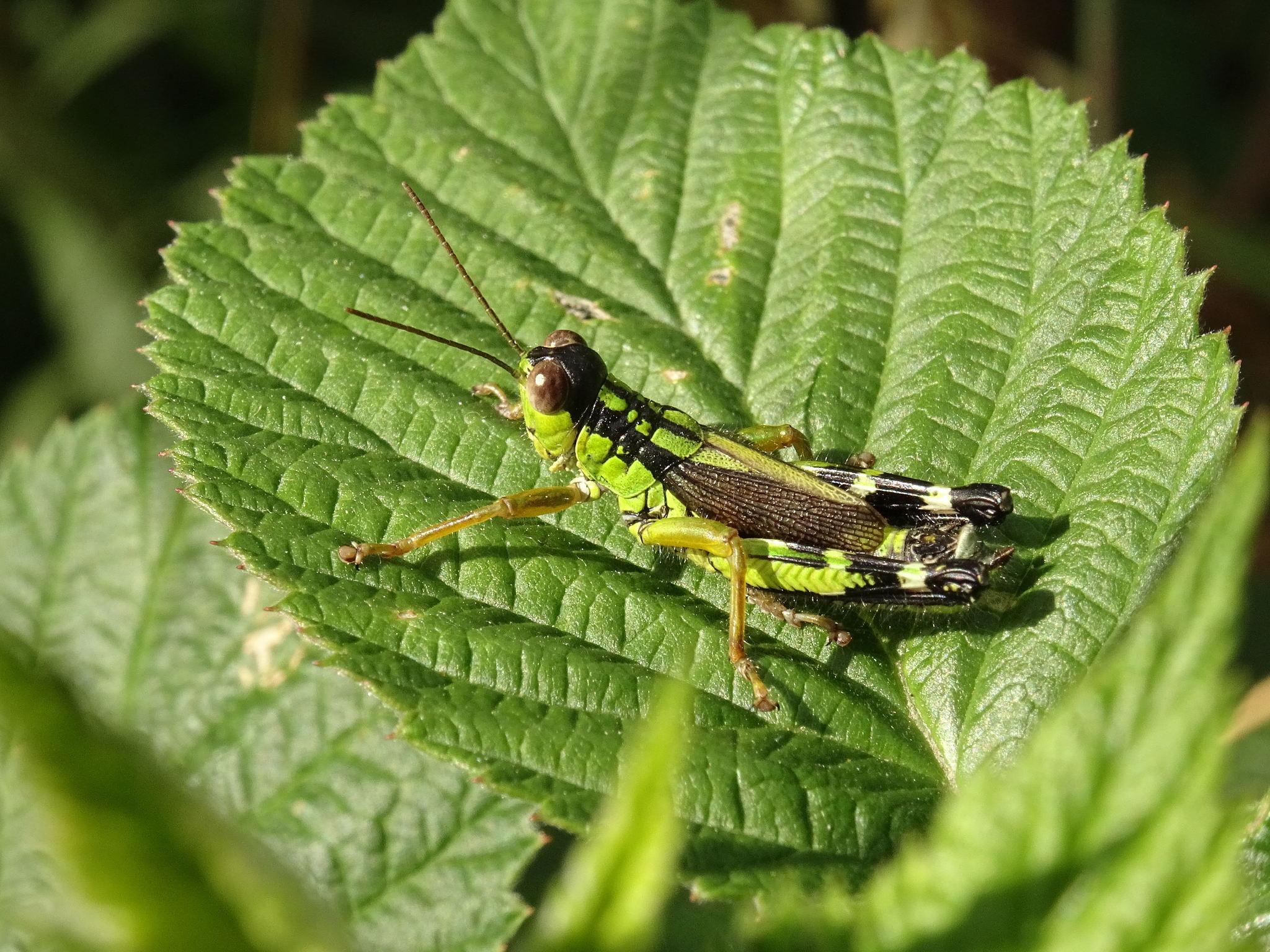
- Nadigella formosanta, Italy

Scientific classification
- Kingdom: Animalia
- Phylum: Arthropoda
- Clade: Pancrustacea
- Class: Insecta
- Order: Orthoptera
- Suborder: Caelifera
- Family: Acrididae
- Tribe: Podismini
- Subtribe: Miramellina
- Genus: Nadigella; Galvagni, 1986
- Species: N. formosanta

Binomial name
- Nadigella formosanta (Fruhstorfer, 1921)

= Nadigella =

Genus of grasshoppers

Nadigella is a genus of spur-throated grasshoppers in the family Acrididae. There is one described species in Nadigella, N. formosanta, found in Europe.
