= Fruhstorferiola =

Scientific classification
- Kingdom: Animalia
- Phylum: Arthropoda
- Clade: Pancrustacea
- Class: Insecta
- Order: Orthoptera
- Suborder: Caelifera
- Family: Acrididae
- Tribe: Podismini
- Genus: Fruhstorferiola; Willemse, 1921

Synonyms
- Caudellacris Rehn & Rehn, 1939; Fruhstorferia Willemse, 1921

Genus of grasshoppers

External image
- Images at iNaturalist

Fruhstorferiola is a genus of grasshoppers, subfamily Melanoplinae, tribe Podismini Jacobson, 1905 and subtribe Tonkinacridina Ito, 2015; the type species was identified from Vietnam, but a majority of species are found only in China.

== Species ==
The Orthoptera Species File lists the following:

1. Fruhstorferiola brachyptera Zheng, 1988
2. Fruhstorferiola cerinitibia Zheng, 1998
3. Fruhstorferiola huangshanensis Bi & Xia, 1980
4. Fruhstorferiola huayinensis Bi & Xia, 1980
5. Fruhstorferiola kulinga (Chang, 1940)
6. Fruhstorferiola okinawaensis (Shiraki, 1930) (Japan)
7. Fruhstorferiola omei (Rehn & Rehn, 1939)
8. Fruhstorferiola rubicornis Zheng & Shi, 1998
9. Fruhstorferiola rufucorna Zheng & Yang, 1999
10. Fruhstorferiola sibynecerca Zheng, 2001
11. Fruhstorferiola tonkinensis (Willemse, 1921) - type species from "Than-Moi" (probably in Lạng Sơn Province), Vietnam (as junior homonym "Fruhstorferia"); also found in southern China (also under synonym Longgenacris rufiantennus Zheng & Wei, 2003)
12. Fruhstorferiola viridifemorata (Caudell, 1921)
13. Fruhstorferiola xuefengshana Fu & Zheng, 2000
