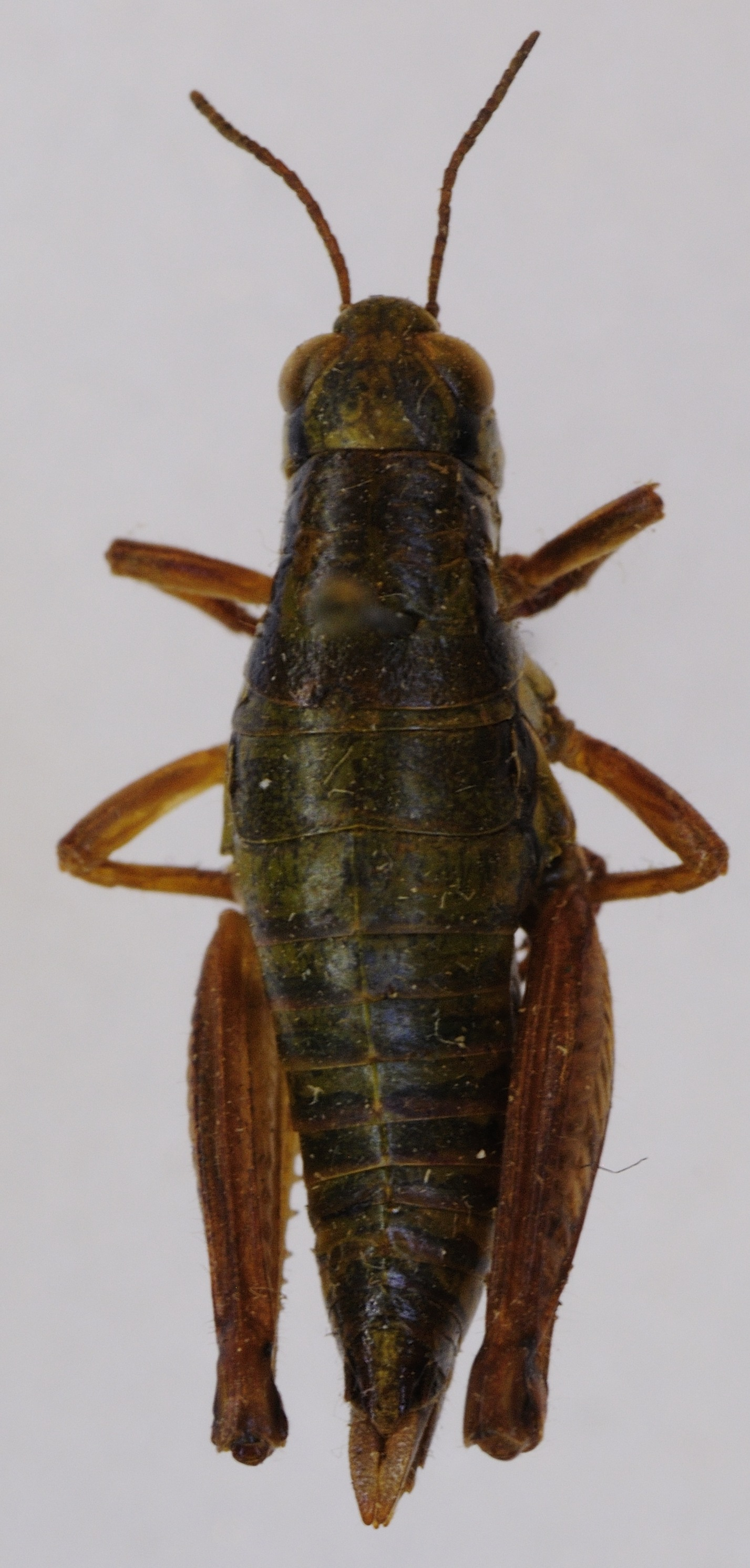

Scientific classification
- Kingdom: Animalia
- Phylum: Arthropoda
- Clade: Pancrustacea
- Class: Insecta
- Order: Orthoptera
- Suborder: Caelifera
- Family: Acrididae
- Tribe: Podismini
- Subtribe: Miramellina
- Genus: Pseudoprumna; Dovnar-Zapolskij, 1932
- Species: P. baldensis

Binomial name
- Pseudoprumna baldensis (Krauss, 1883)

= Pseudoprumna =

Species of grasshopper

Pseudoprumna is a monotypic genus of grasshoppers in the subfamily Melanoplinae and tribe Podismini. The only species is Pseudoprumna baldensis.

== Description ==
Pseudoprumna baldensis is a stockily built, light green grasshopper. A dark band runs from the eye over the tympanal organ to the end of the abdomen. The band is often reduced to a number of spots. Legs and hearing organ are mainly murky reddish grey. Males reach a body length of 14–17 millimetres (0.55–0.67 in); females 19–22 mm (0.75–0.87 in). Wings do not exist. The hearing organ is well developed.

== Distribution and mode of life ==
This species is endemic to the Italian Alps. It is only known from the eastern slope of the Monte Baldo in altitudes of 1,650–1,800 metres (5,410–5,910 ft) and from three mountain groups west of Lake Garda. The latter occurrences were first discovered in 1992 by Adolf Nadig. The habitat consists of alpine meadows where this species is found on dwarf shrubs and in grass often in high density. Adults can be found in August and September.
