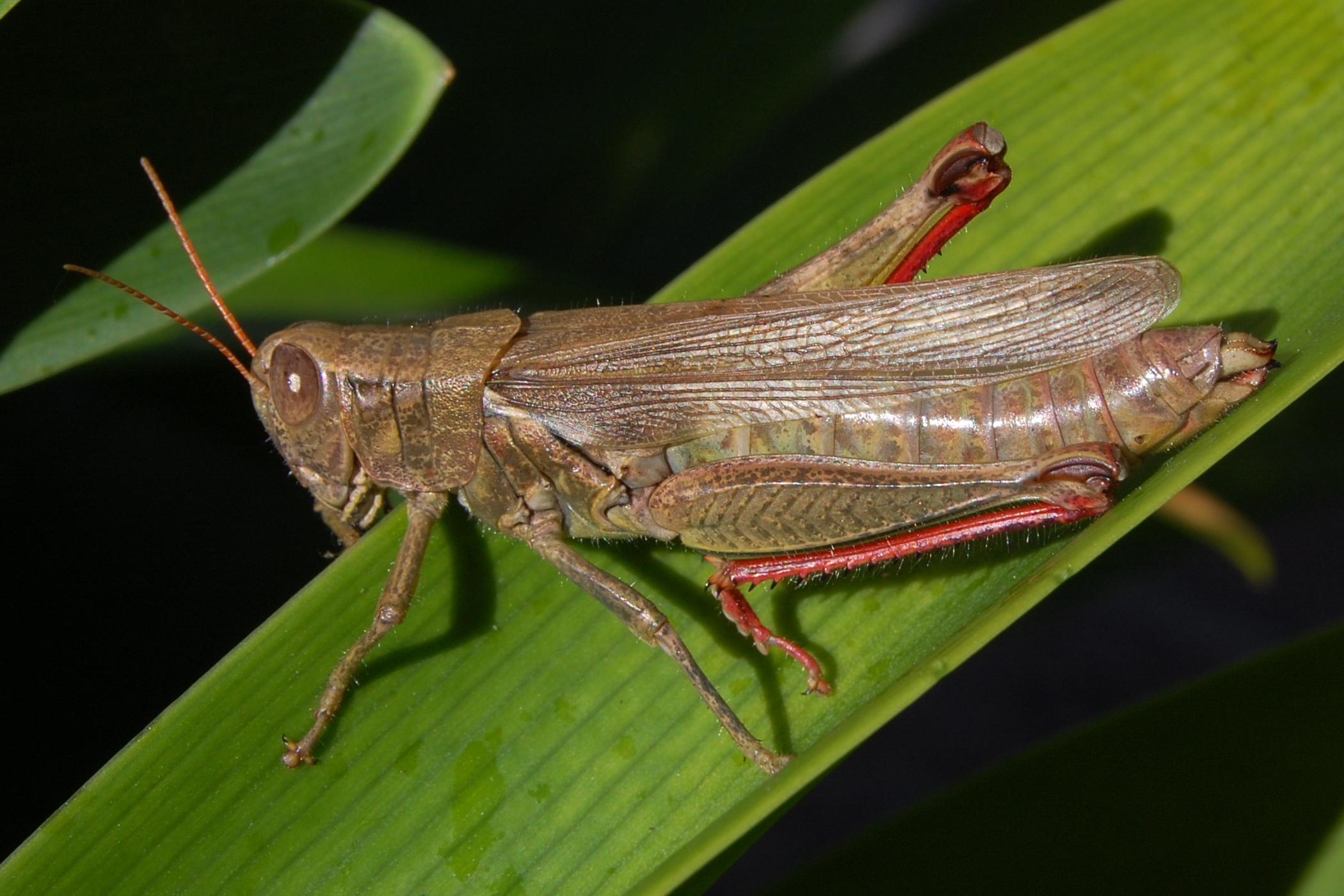

Scientific classification
- Kingdom: Animalia
- Phylum: Arthropoda
- Clade: Pancrustacea
- Class: Insecta
- Order: Orthoptera
- Suborder: Caelifera
- Family: Acrididae
- Tribe: Melanoplini
- Genus: Melanoplus
- Species: M. yarrowii

Binomial name
- Melanoplus yarrowii (Thomas, 1875)

= Melanoplus yarrowii =

Species of grasshopper

Melanoplus yarrowii, known generally as the Yarrow's grasshopper or Yarrow's spur-throat grasshopper, is a species of spur-throated grasshopper in the family Acrididae. It is found in North America.

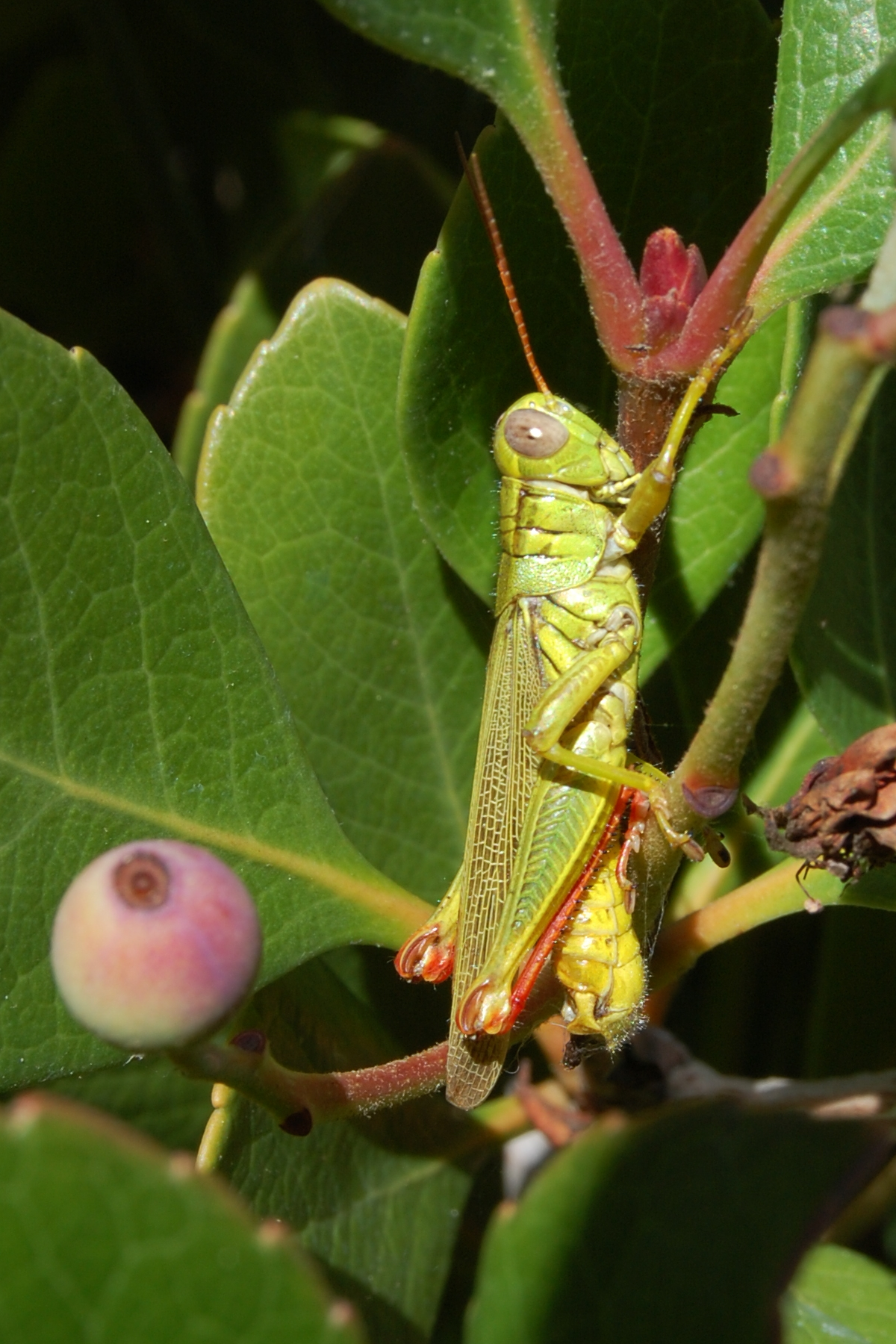
Yarrow's grasshopper, Melanoplus yarrowii

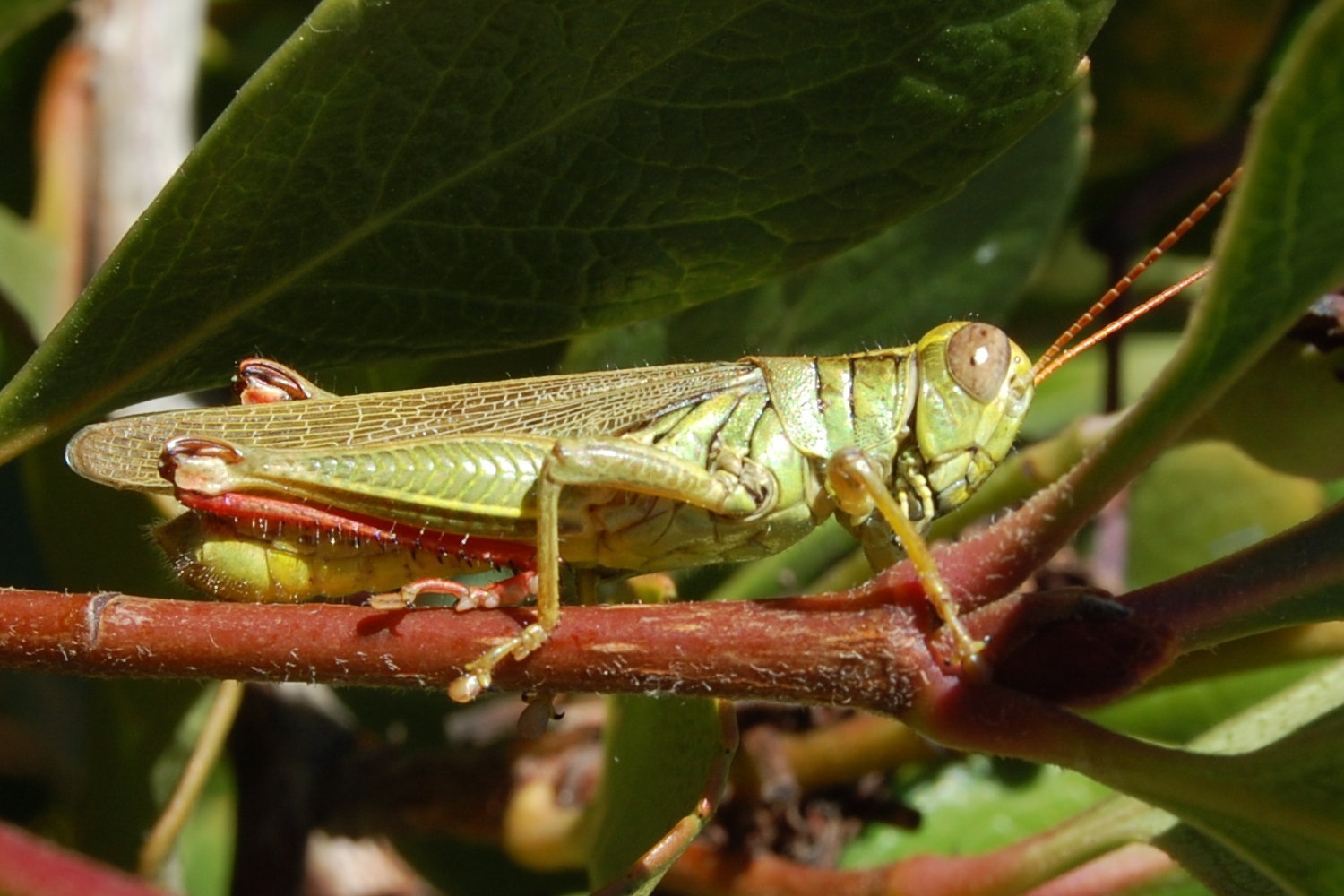
Yarrow's grasshopper, Melanoplus yarrowii
