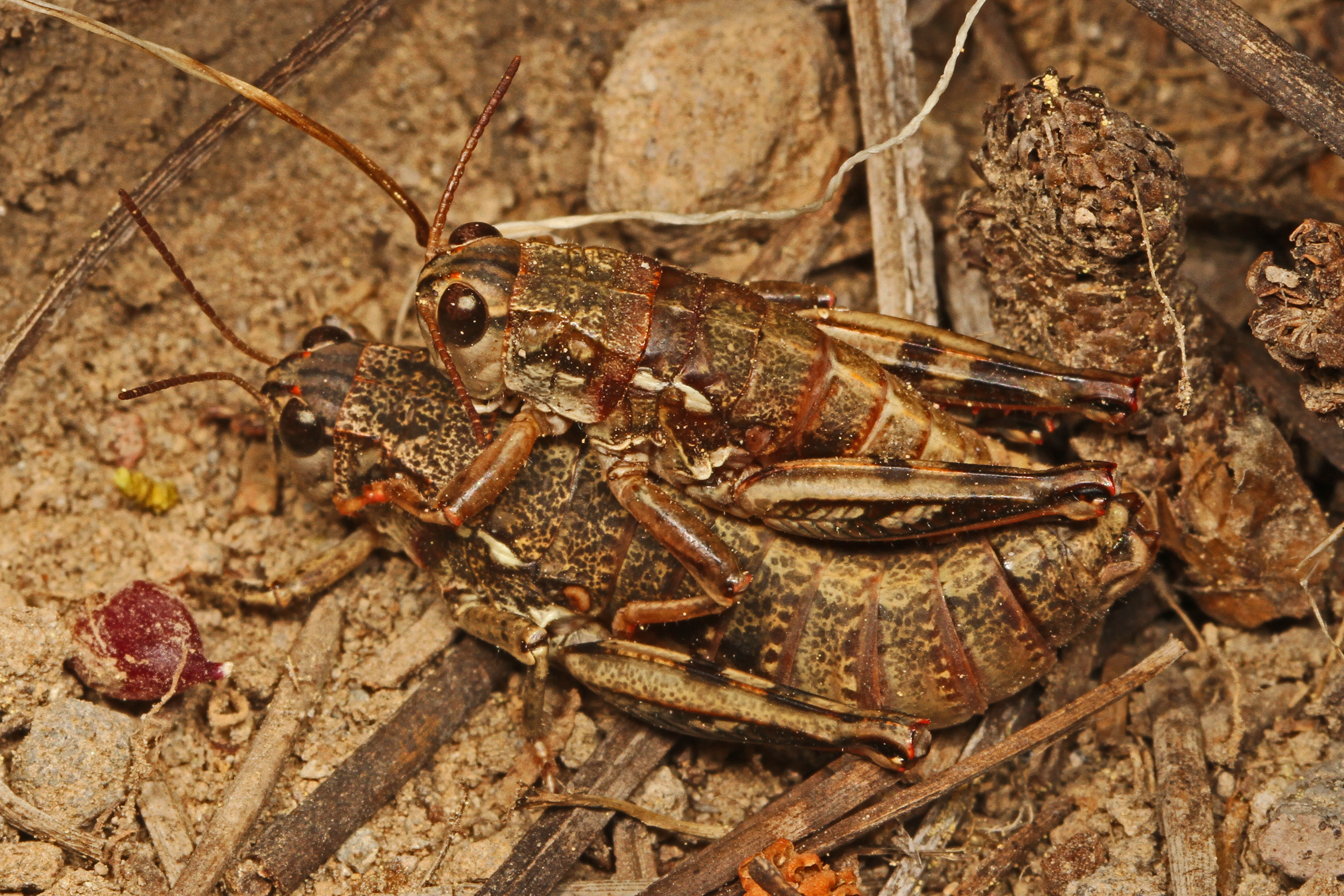
- Bradynotes obesa

Scientific classification
- Kingdom: Animalia
- Phylum: Arthropoda
- Clade: Pancrustacea
- Class: Insecta
- Order: Orthoptera
- Suborder: Caelifera
- Family: Acrididae
- Subfamily: Podisminae
- Genus: Bradynotes; Scudder, 1870

= Bradynotes =

Genus of grasshoppers

Bradynotes is a genus of spur-throated grasshoppers in the family Acrididae. There is at least one described species in Bradynotes, B. obesa, also known as the "slow mountain grasshopper" and "mountain lubber grasshopper". It is found in North America, in the western United States and northwestern Mexico.

There are six subspecies of Bradynotes obesa:

- Bradynotes obesa caurus Scudder, 1897
- Bradynotes obesa deplanata Hebard, 1919
- Bradynotes obesa kaibab Hebard, 1919
- Bradynotes obesa obesa (Thomas, 1872)
- Bradynotes obesa opima Scudder, 1880
- Bradynotes obesa referta Scudder, 1897
