= Italopodisma =

Scientific classification
- Kingdom: Animalia
- Phylum: Arthropoda
- Clade: Pancrustacea
- Class: Insecta
- Order: Orthoptera
- Suborder: Caelifera
- Family: Acrididae
- Subfamily: Melanoplinae
- Tribe: Podismini
- Genus: Italopodisma; Harz, 1973

Genus of grasshoppers

External image
- Images at iNaturalist

Italopodisma is a genus of Palaearctic grasshoppers in the tribe Podismini and subtribe Miramellina, erected by Harz in 1973. As the genus name suggests, current records of occurrence appear to be confined to Italy.

== Species ==
The Orthoptera Species File lists:

1. Italopodisma acuminata (La Greca, 1969)
2. Italopodisma baccettii (La Greca, 1969)
3. Italopodisma costae (Targioni-Tozzetti, 1881) - type species (as Pezotettis costae Targioni-Tozzetti)
4. Italopodisma ebneri (La Greca, 1954)
5. Italopodisma fiscellana (La Greca, 1954)
6. Italopodisma lagrecai (Galvagni, 1973)
7. Italopodisma lucianae (Baccetti, 1959)
8. Italopodisma samnitica (La Greca, 1954)
9. Italopodisma trapezoidalis (La Greca, 1969)
