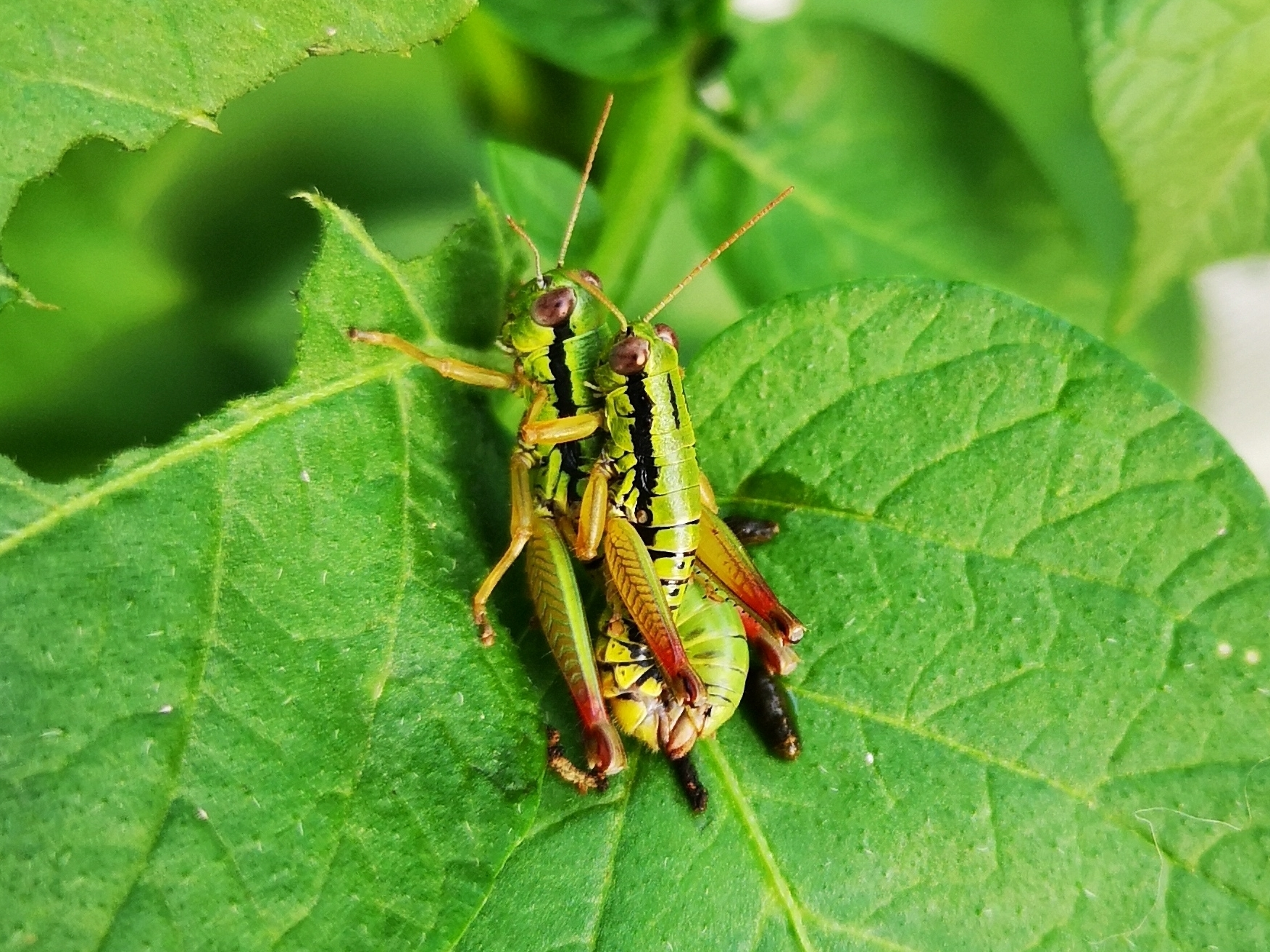
- Micropodisma salamandra: male & female

Scientific classification
- Kingdom: Animalia
- Phylum: Arthropoda
- Clade: Pancrustacea
- Class: Insecta
- Order: Orthoptera
- Suborder: Caelifera
- Family: Acrididae
- Subfamily: Melanoplinae
- Tribe: Podismini
- Genus: Micropodisma; Dovnar-Zapolskij, 1932

= Micropodisma =

Genus of grasshoppers

Micropodisma is a genus of Palaearctic grasshoppers in the tribe Podismini and subtribe Podismina, erected by D.P. Dovnar-Zapolskij in 1932. Species have a (possibly incomplete) recorded distribution from the Balkans, southern Russia to Kazakhstan.

== Species ==
The Orthoptera Species File lists:

1. Micropodisma koenigi (Burr, 1913) - type species (as Podisma koenigi Burr)
2. Micropodisma malkovskyi Childebaev & Kolov, 2017
3. Micropodisma salamandra (Fischer, 1853)
4. Micropodisma svanetica Dovnar-Zapolskij, 1932

== Gallery ==
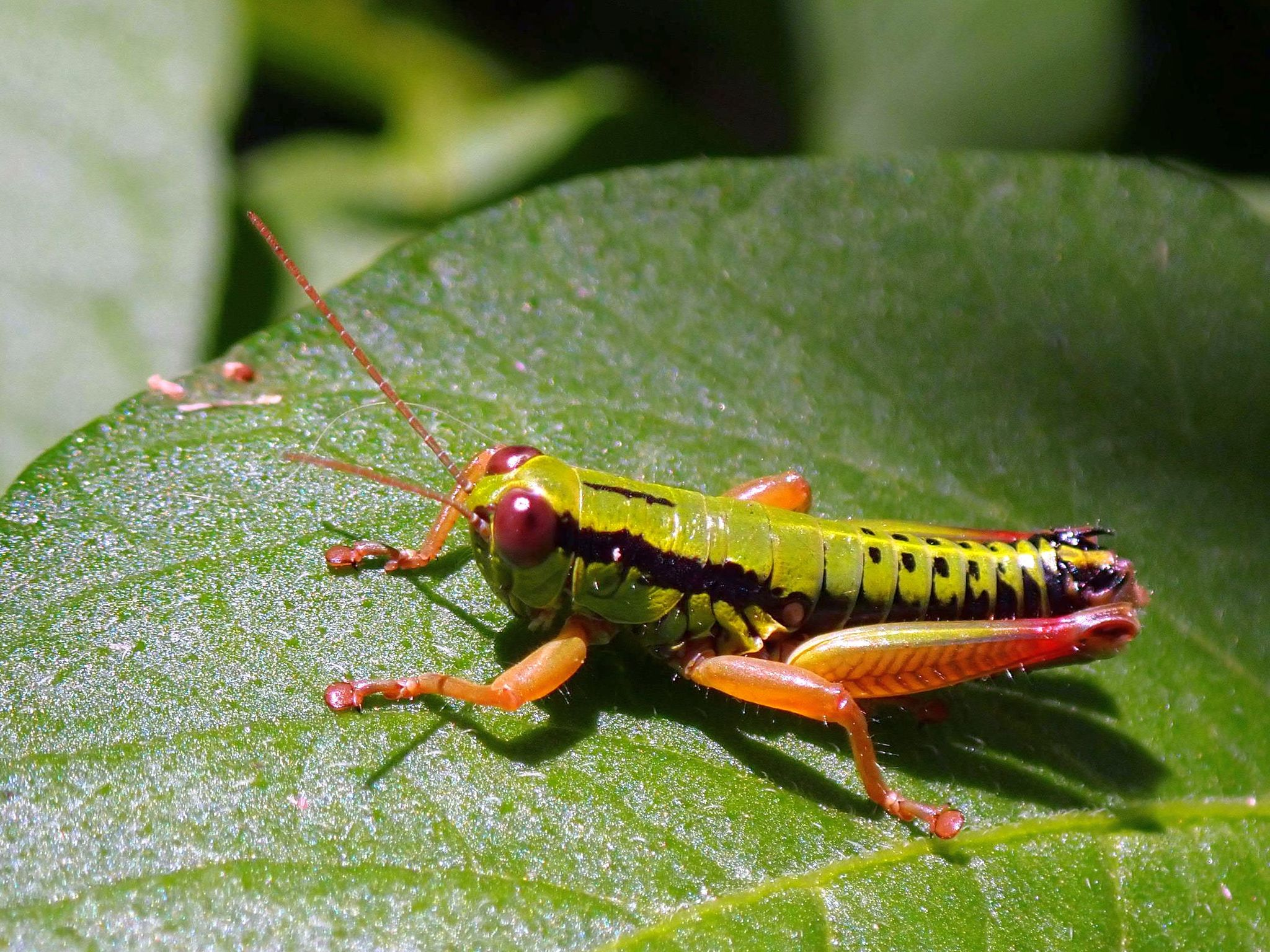
Micropodisma salamandra

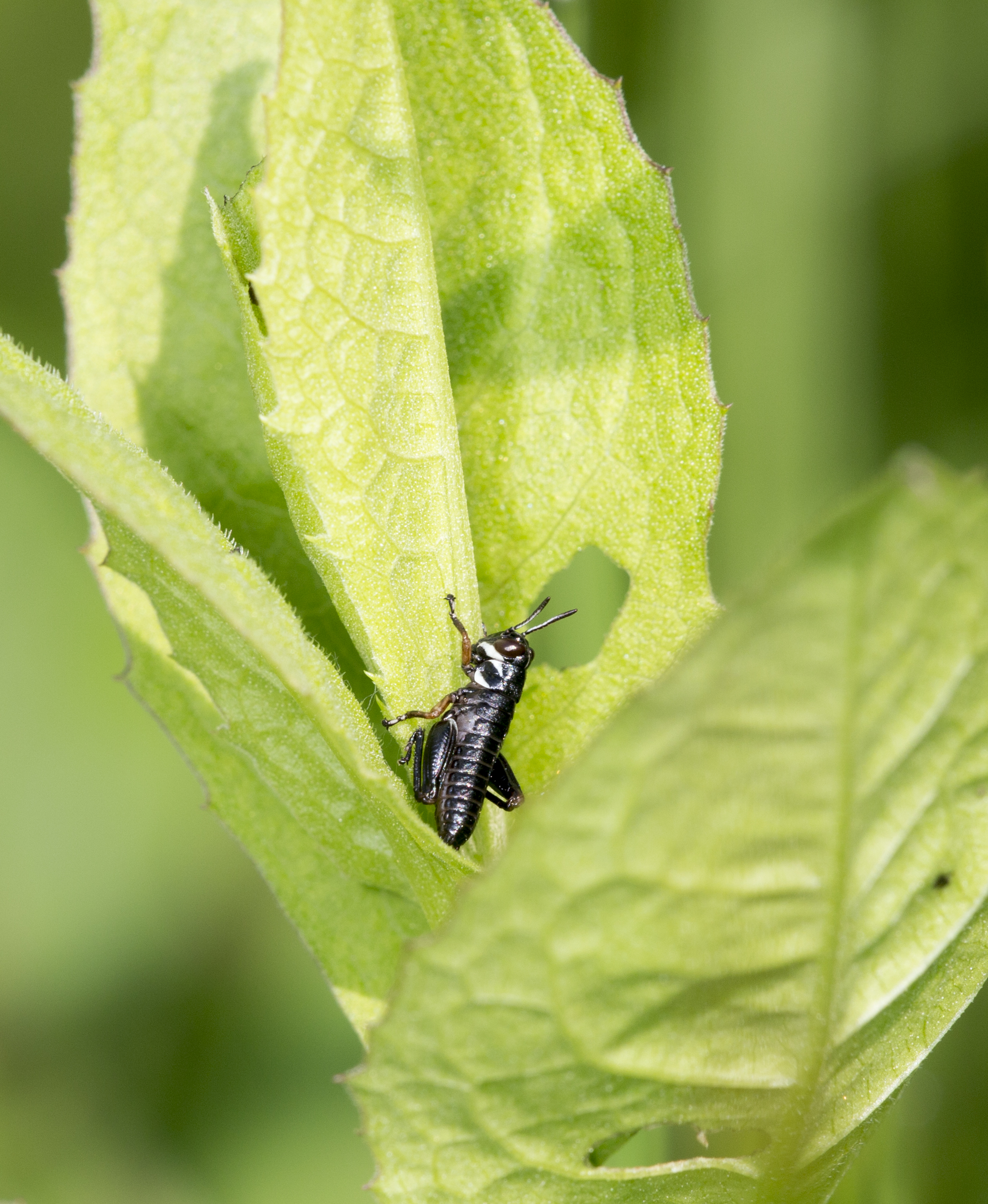
M. salamandra nymph
