= Peripodisma =

Scientific classification
- Kingdom: Animalia
- Phylum: Arthropoda
- Clade: Pancrustacea
- Class: Insecta
- Order: Orthoptera
- Suborder: Caelifera
- Family: Acrididae
- Subfamily: Melanoplinae
- Tribe: Podismini
- Genus: Peripodisma; Willemse, 1972

Genus of grasshoppers

External image
- Image at iNaturalist

Peripodisma is a genus of Palaearctic grasshoppers in the tribe Podismini, erected by F.M.H. Willemse in 1972. Species records to date (2023) are solely from Greece and Albania.

== Species ==
The Orthoptera Species File lists:

1. Peripodisma ceraunii Lemonnier-Darcemont & Darcemont, 2015
2. Peripodisma llofizii Lemonnier-Darcemont & Darcemont, 2015
3. Peripodisma tymphii Willemse, 1972 - type species
