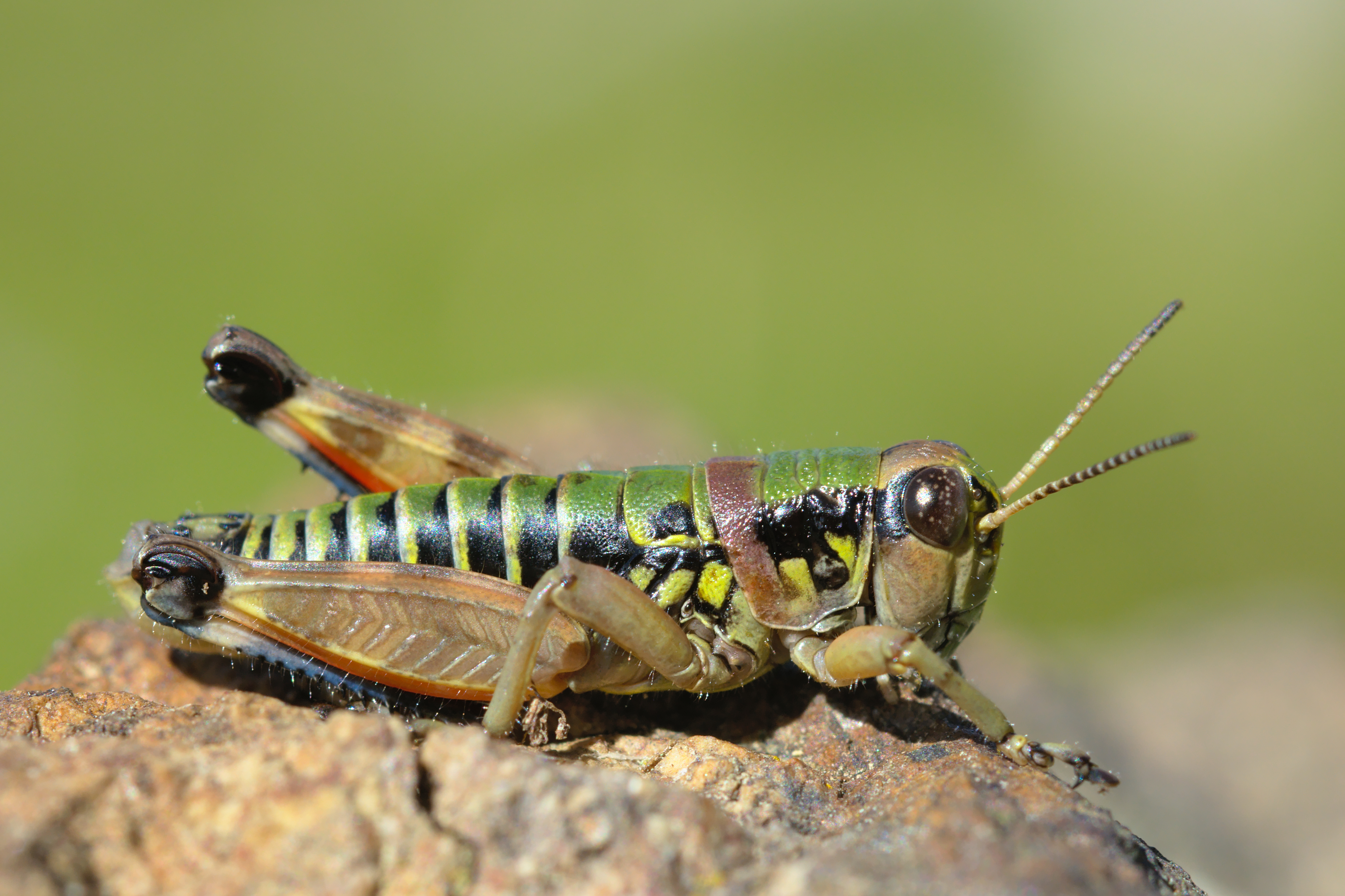
- Cophopodisma pyrenaea male

Scientific classification
- Kingdom: Animalia
- Phylum: Arthropoda
- Clade: Pancrustacea
- Class: Insecta
- Order: Orthoptera
- Suborder: Caelifera
- Family: Acrididae
- Subfamily: Melanoplinae
- Tribe: Podismini
- Genus: Cophopodisma; Dovnar-Zapolskij, 1932

Synonyms
- Gomphopodisma Dovnar-Zapolskij, 1932

= Cophopodisma =

Genus of grasshoppers

External image
- Images at iNaturalist

Cophopodisma is a genus of Palaearctic grasshoppers in the tribe Podismini and subtribe Miramellina, erected by D.P. Dovnar-Zapolskij in 1932. Species records have a highly disjointed distribution, with two species from Spain and France (as their names suggest) and C. yunnanea from China.

== Species ==
The Orthoptera Species File lists:

1. Cophopodisma ibera Ramme, 1951
2. Cophopodisma pyrenaea (Fischer, 1853) - type species (as Pezotettix pyrenaea Fischer)
3. Cophopodisma yunnanea Ramme, 1939
