= Chloroplus =

Scientific classification
- Domain: Eukaryota
- Kingdom: Animalia
- Phylum: Arthropoda
- Class: Insecta
- Order: Orthoptera
- Suborder: Caelifera
- Family: Acrididae
- Subfamily: Melanoplinae
- Tribe: Melanoplini
- Genus: Chloroplus; Hebard, 1918
- Species: C. cactocaetes

Binomial name
- Chloroplus cactocaetes Hebard, 1918

Genus of grasshoppers

Chloroplus is a genus of spur-throated grasshoppers in the family Acrididae. There is one described species in Chloroplus, Chloroplus cactocaetes.
