= Tonkinacris =

Scientific classification
- Kingdom: Animalia
- Phylum: Arthropoda
- Clade: Pancrustacea
- Class: Insecta
- Order: Orthoptera
- Suborder: Caelifera
- Family: Acrididae
- Subfamily: Melanoplinae
- Tribe: Podismini
- Genus: Tonkinacris; Carl, 1916

Genus of grasshoppers

External image
- Images at iNaturalist

Tonkinacris is a genus of grasshoppers in the family Acrididae, subfamily Melanoplinae, tribe Podismini Jacobson, 1905 and subtribe Tonkinacridina Ito, 2015. The recorded distribution of species is in East Asia: including southern China and Vietnam.

== Species ==
The Orthoptera Species File lists:

1. Tonkinacris damingshanus Li, Lu, Jiang & Meng, 1991
2. Tonkinacris decoratus Carl, 1916 - type species - locality: "Than-Moi" (probably in Lạng Sơn province), Vietnam.
3. Tonkinacris meridionalis Li, 1986
4. Tonkinacris ruficerus Ito, 1999
5. Tonkinacris sinensis Chang, 1937
6. Tonkinacris yaeyamaensis Ito, 1999
