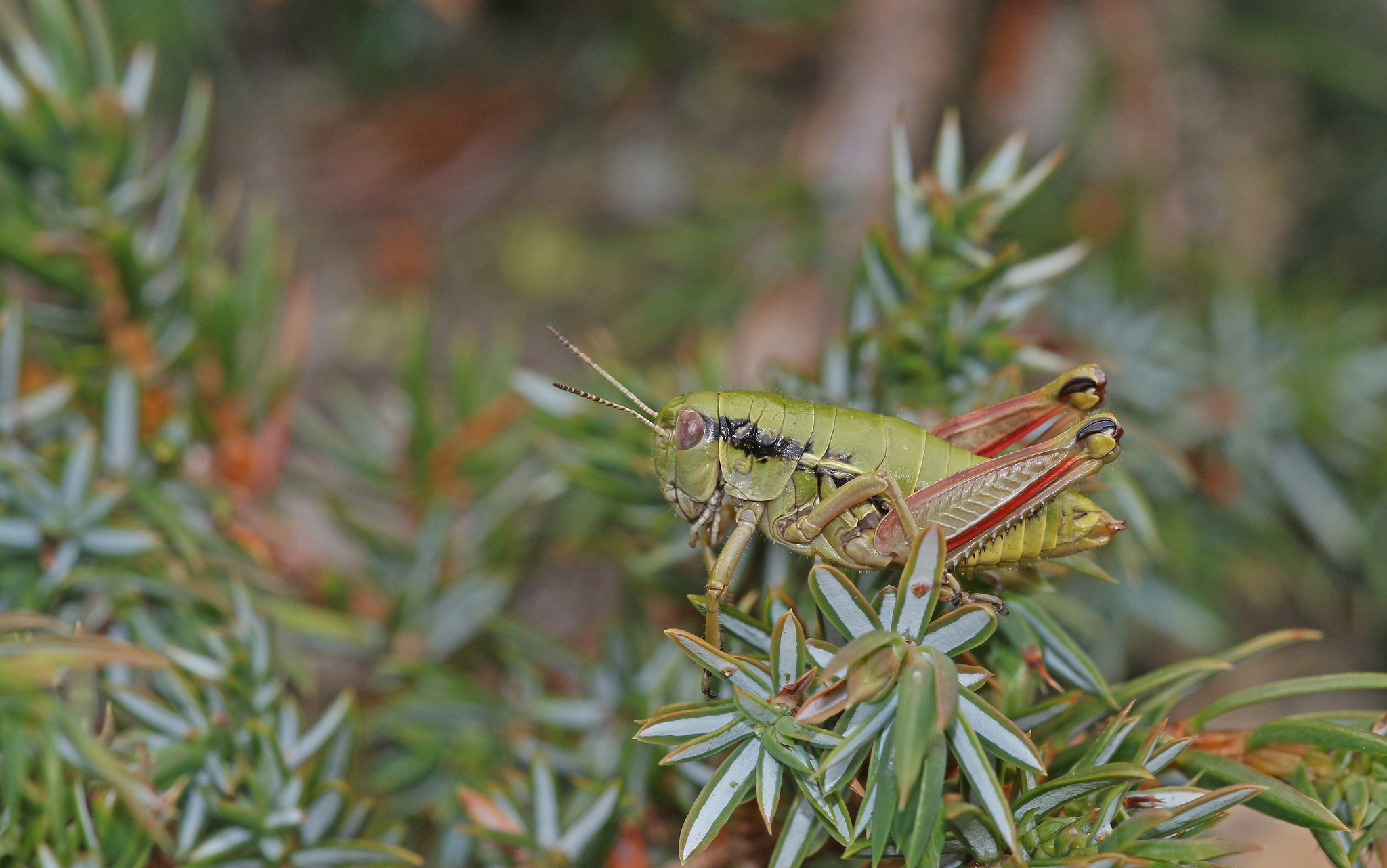
- Epipodisma pedemontana, Italy

Conservation status
- Near Threatened (IUCN 3.1)

Scientific classification
- Kingdom: Animalia
- Phylum: Arthropoda
- Clade: Pancrustacea
- Class: Insecta
- Order: Orthoptera
- Suborder: Caelifera
- Family: Acrididae
- Subfamily: Melanoplinae
- Tribe: Podismini
- Subtribe: Miramellina
- Genus: Epipodisma; Ramme, 1951
- Species: E. pedemontana

Binomial name
- Epipodisma pedemontana (Brunner von Wattenwyl, 1882)

= Epipodisma =

Genus of grasshoppers

Epipodisma is a genus of spur-throated grasshoppers in the family Acrididae. There is one described species in Epipodisma, E. pedemontana. It is found in Italy, Switzerland, and France.
