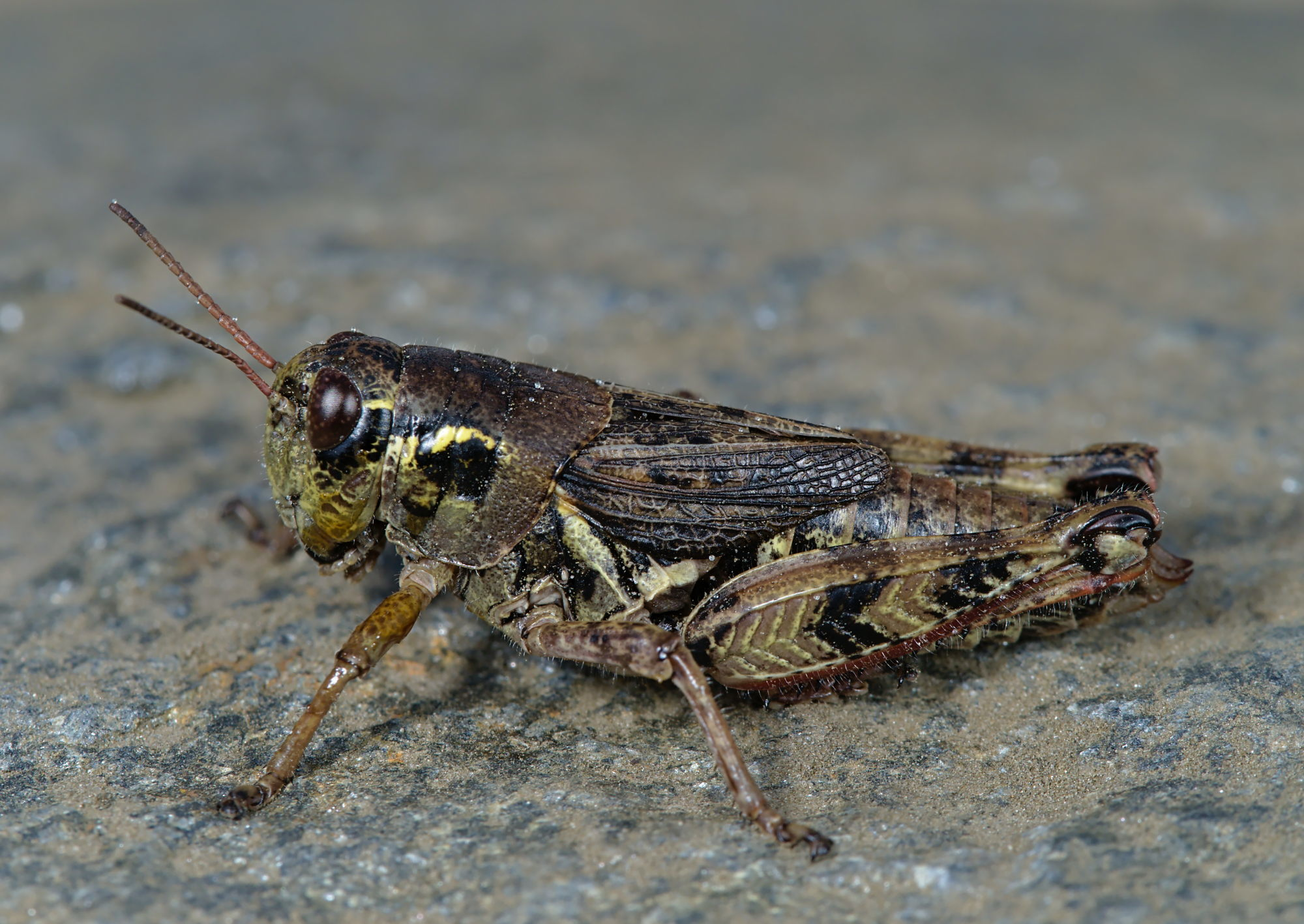
- Bohemanella frigida, France

Scientific classification
- Kingdom: Animalia
- Phylum: Arthropoda
- Clade: Pancrustacea
- Class: Insecta
- Order: Orthoptera
- Suborder: Caelifera
- Family: Acrididae
- Subfamily: Melanoplinae
- Tribe: Podismini
- Genus: Bohemanella; Ramme, 1951
- Species: B. frigida

Binomial name
- Bohemanella frigida (Boheman, 1846)

= Bohemanella =

Genus of grasshoppers

Bohemanella is a monotypic genus of insects belonging to the family Acrididae. The only species is Bohemanella frigida.

The species was described by Boheman in 1846.

The species is native to Eurasia and Northwestern America.

== Subspecies ==
These subspecies belong to the species Bohemanella frigida:

- Bohemanella frigida frigida (Boheman, 1846)
- Bohemanella frigida kamtchatkae (Sjöstedt, 1935)
- Bohemanella frigida strandi (Fruhstorfer, 1921)
