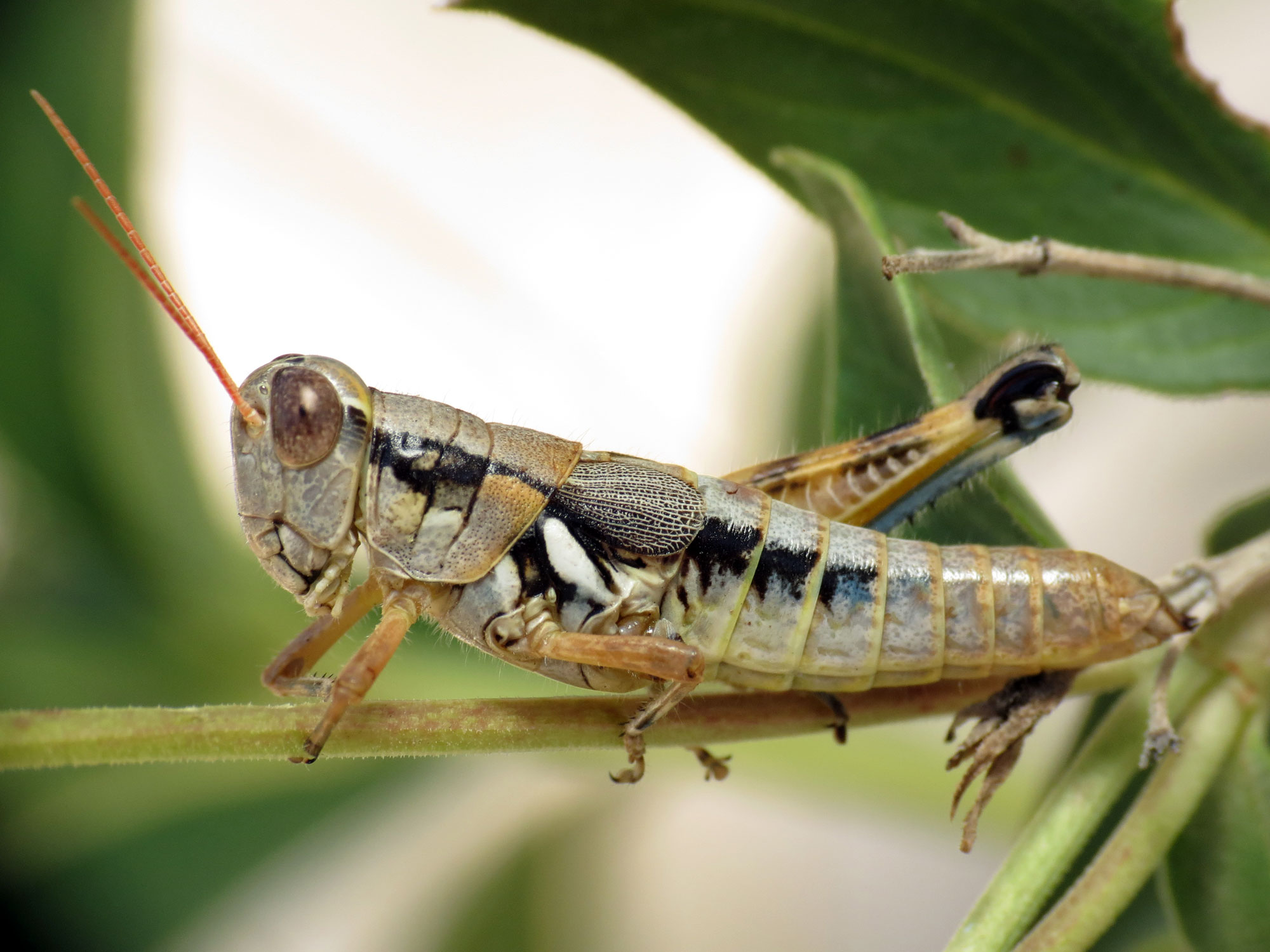
- Phoetaliotes nebrascensis

Scientific classification
- Kingdom: Animalia
- Phylum: Arthropoda
- Class: Insecta
- Order: Orthoptera
- Suborder: Caelifera
- Family: Acrididae
- Tribe: Melanoplini
- Genus: Phoetaliotes; Scudder, 1897
- Species: P. nebrascensis

Binomial name
- Phoetaliotes nebrascensis (Thomas, 1872)

= Phoetaliotes =

Genus of grasshoppers

Phoetaliotes is a genus of spur-throated grasshoppers in the family Acrididae. There is at least one described species in Phoetaliotes, P. nebrascensis.

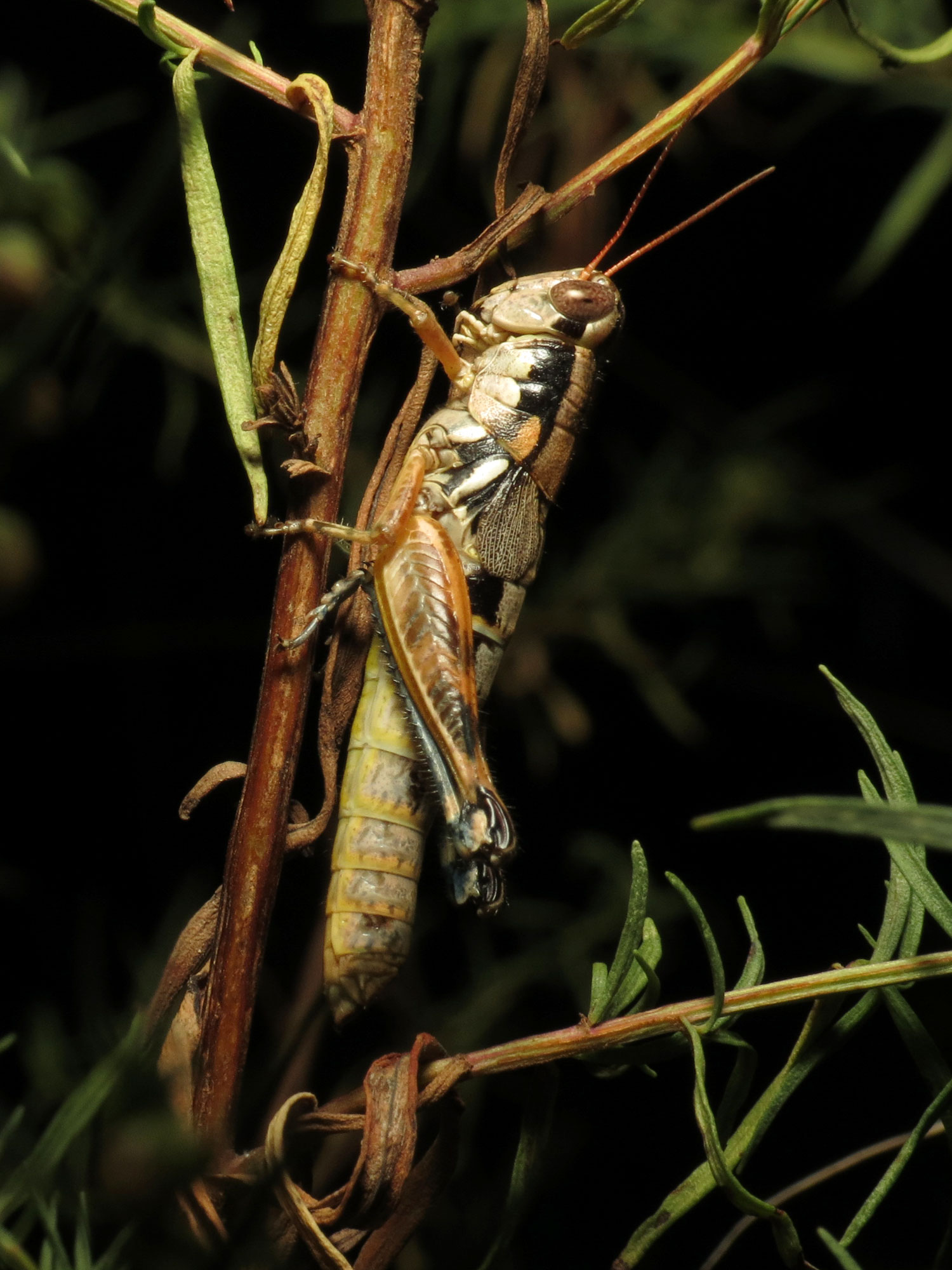
Phoetaliotes nebrascensis
