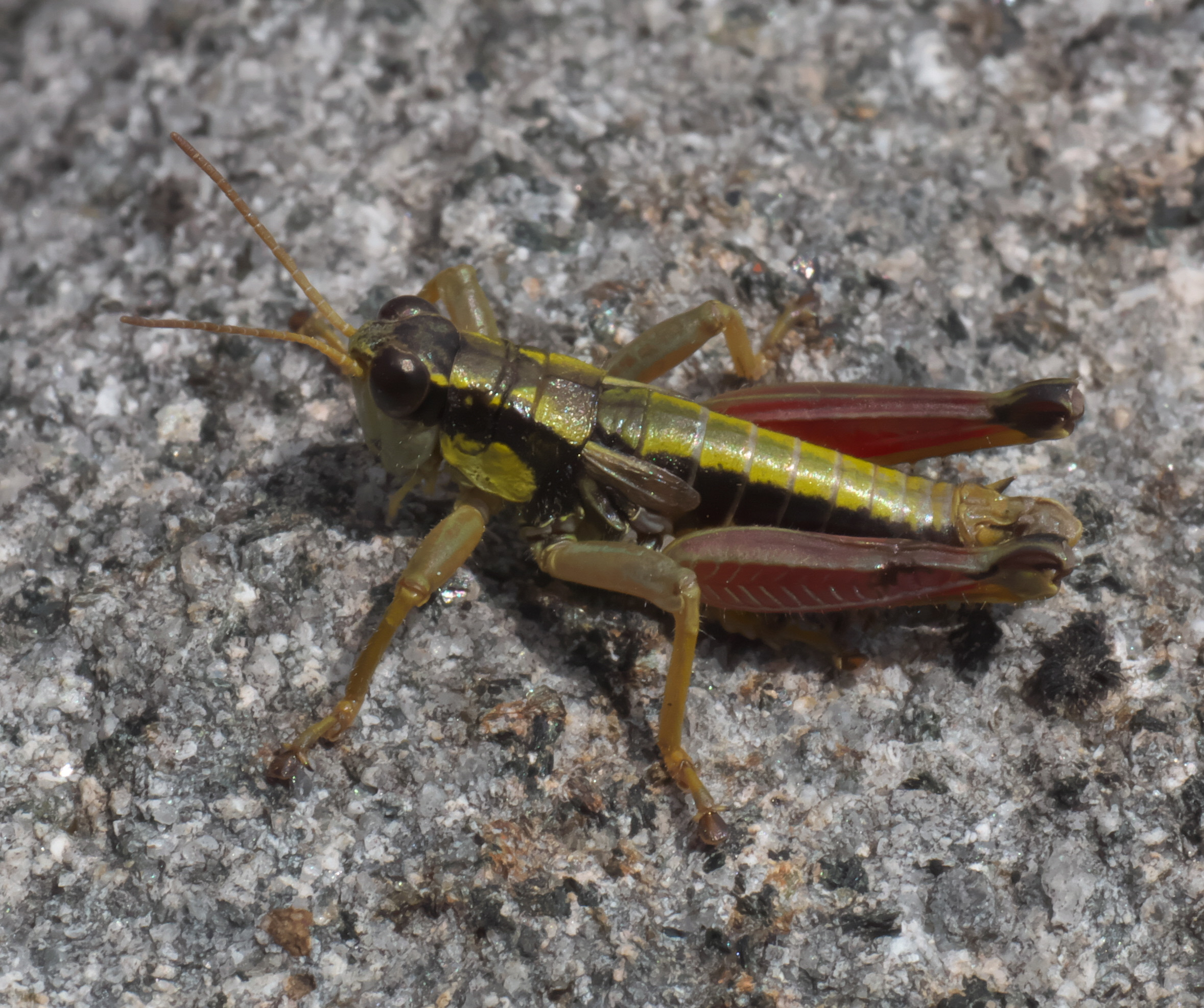
- Prumnacris rainierensis

Scientific classification
- Kingdom: Animalia
- Phylum: Arthropoda
- Clade: Pancrustacea
- Class: Insecta
- Order: Orthoptera
- Suborder: Caelifera
- Family: Acrididae
- Subfamily: Melanoplinae
- Tribe: Podismini
- Genus: Prumnacris; Rehn & Rehn, 1944
- Species: P. rainierensis

Binomial name
- Prumnacris rainierensis (Caudell, 1907)

= Prumnacris =

Genus of grasshoppers

Prumnacris is a monotypic genus of grasshoppers in the subfamily Melanoplinae, from NE America: where Prumnacris rainierensis can be found.
