= Hermann August Krauss =

Austrian entomologist (1848–1939)

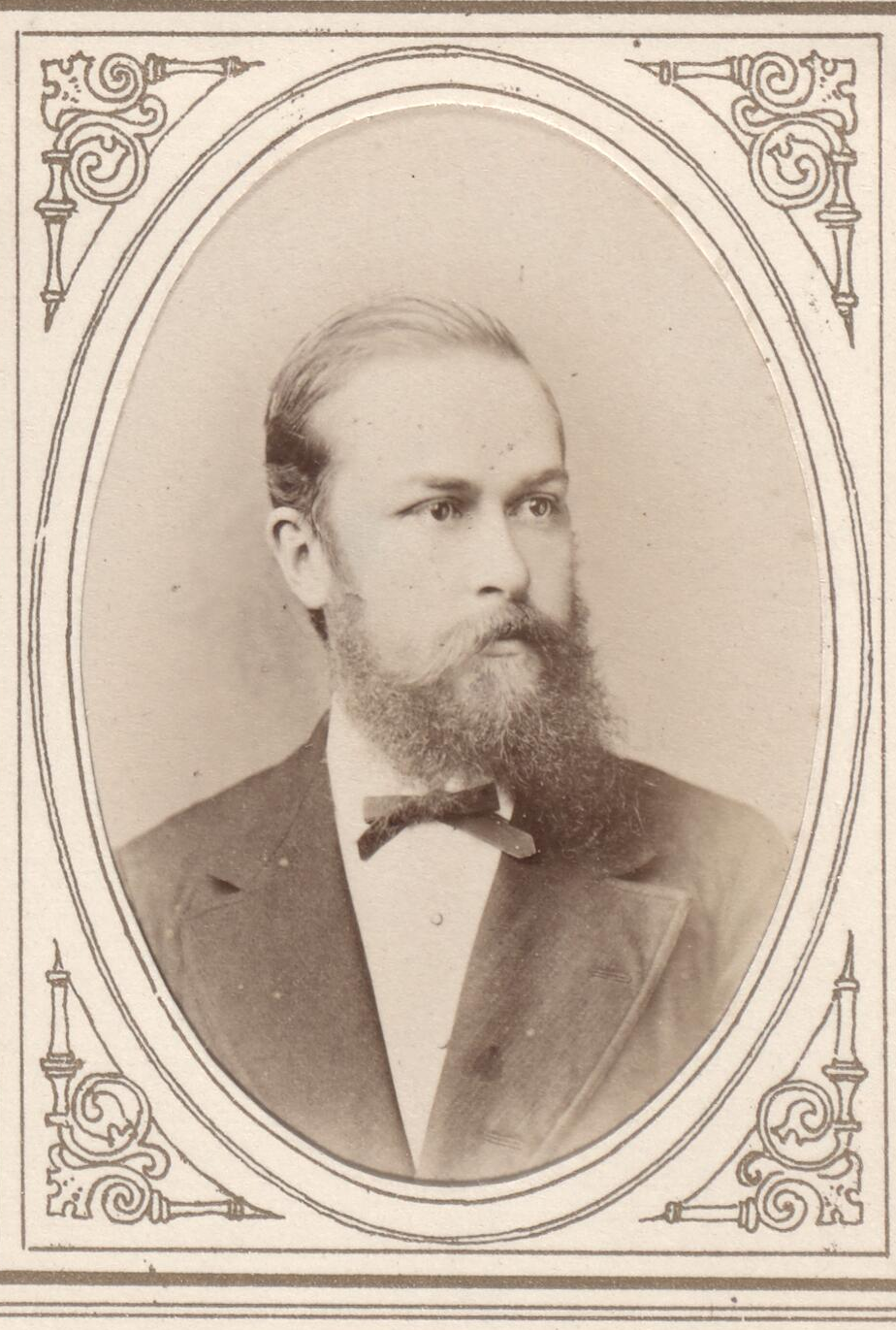
- Born: 1 August 1848
- Died: 21 April 1939 (aged 90)

Hermann August Krauss (1 August 1848 – 21 April 1939) was a German physician and entomologist who specialised in Orthoptera and Dermaptera. The species sophya kraussii was named after him by Brunner von Wattenwyl.

Krauss was born in Tübingen, the son of district physician August Krauss. He studied medicine at the University of Tübingen from 1867 to 1874. He studied zoology under Franz Leydig. He served during the Franco-Prussian War (1870-71) in Kirchheim unter Teck and Schwäbisch Gmünd. He worked as an assistant to the zoologist Karl Claus from 1874 to 1876. From 1876 to 1880 he worked in the Royal Cabinet of zoology in Vienna working with August Brauer and Alois Rogenhofer. He served as a physician in Tübingen from 1881 to 1936, working for some time in the Reserve Hospital during World War I. He took a special interest in the orthoptera and made collections widely. He also described numerous species, illustrating his new species descriptions with care. He travelled in the Alps with Felix Hoppe-Seyler and also went to the Canary Islands (1889) with Alphonse Pictet and Karl Brunner von Wattenwyl. His collections are in the Naturhistorisches Museum in Vienna and in the Württemberg Natural History Collection.

== Selected publications ==
- 1877. Orthopteren vom Senegal. Anzeiger der Kaiserlichen Akademie der Wissenschaften. Mathematisch-Naturwissenschaftliche Klasse, Wien, 14, no. xvi : 141-145.
- 1878. Orthopteren vom Senegal gesammelt von Dr. Frantz Steindachner. Sitzungsberichte der Kaiserlichen Akademie der Wissenschaften. Mathematisch-Naturwissenschaftliche Klasse, Wien, (incorrectly dated 1877), 76 (1) : 29-63, 2 pl.
- 1890. Erklärung der Orthopteren-Tafeln J. C. Savigny’s in der "Description de l’Égypte". Aus der Literatur zusammengestellt und mit Bemerkungen Versehen. Verhandlungen der zoologisch-botanischen Gesellschaft in Wien, 40 : 227-272.
- 1891. Beitrag zur Kenntniss westafrikanischer Orthopteren. 2. Orthopteren der Guinea-Inseln São Thomé und Rolas, gesammelt von Prof. Dr. Richard Greeff. Zoologische Jahrbücher (Systematik)(incorrectly dated 1890), 5 : 647-668, pl. 45.
- 1892. Systematisches Verzeichnis der canarischen Dermapteren und Orthopteren mit Diagnosen der neuen Gattungen und Arten.Zoologischer Anzeiger, Jena, 15 (no.390) : 163-171.
- 1902. Die namen der ältesten Dermapteren-(Orthopteren-) Gattungen und ihre Verwendung für Familien- und Unterfamilien-Benennungen auf Grund der jetzigen Nomenclaturregeln. Zoologischer Anzeiger, Jena, 25 (no. 676) : 530-543.
- 1902. Beitrag zur Kenntniss der Orthopterenfauna der Sahara. Verhandlungen der zoologisch-botanischen Gesellschaft in Wien, 52 (4) : 230-254.
- 1902 Diagnosen neuer Orthopteren aus Südarabien und von der Insel Sokotra. Anzeiger der Kaiserlichen Akademie der Wissenschaften. Mathematisch-Naturwissenschaftliche Klasse, Wien, 39 : 53-58.
- 1909. Dermaptera und Orthoptera aus Ägypten, der Halbinsel Sinai, Palästina und Syrien und Syrien. In Kneucher A., Zoologische Ergebnisse zweier in den Jahren 1902 und 1904 durch die Sinai-halbinsel botanischen Studiereisen. Verhandlungen des Naturwissenchaftlichen Vereins in Karlsruhe, 21 : 99-119, 12 fig.

== Other sources ==
- Kaltenbach, A. P. 2003. Die Orthopterensammlung des Naturhistorischen Museums in Wien und ihre Geschichte. Denisia 8 57-61, 2 Photos.
- Nonveiller, G. 1999. The Pioneers of the research on the Insects of Dalmatia. Zagreb, Hrvatski Pridodoslovni Muzej : 1-390.
