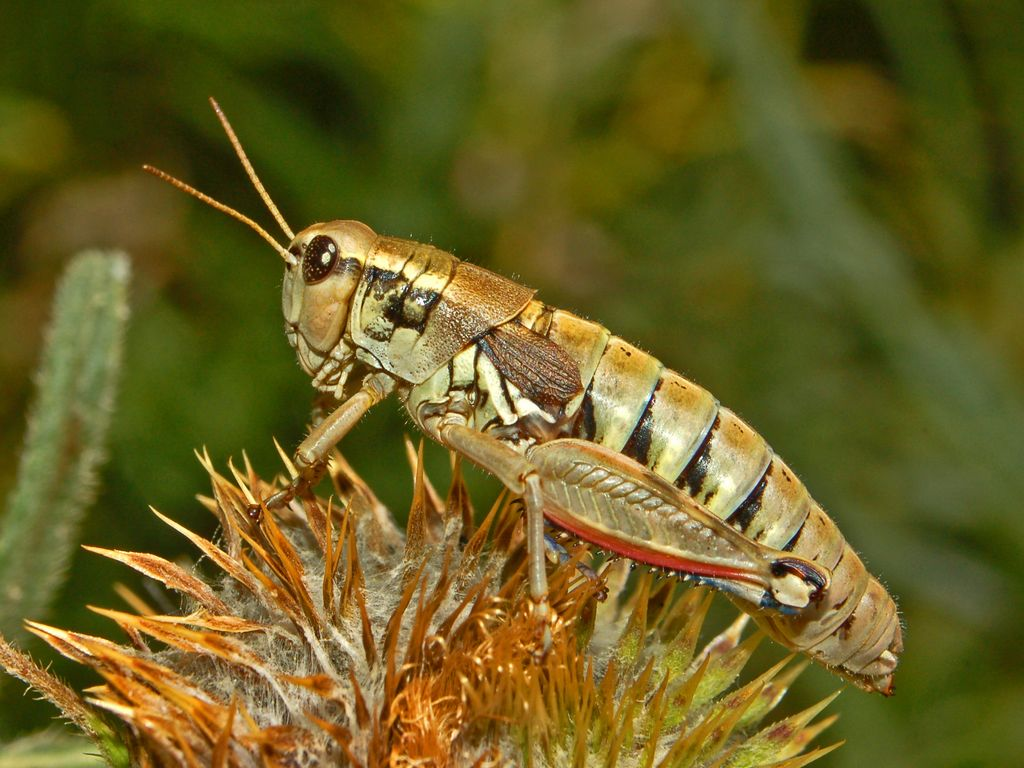
- Podisma pedestris

Scientific classification
- Kingdom: Animalia
- Phylum: Arthropoda
- Clade: Pancrustacea
- Class: Insecta
- Order: Orthoptera
- Suborder: Caelifera
- Family: Acrididae
- Tribe: Podismini
- Genus: Podisma; Berthold, 1827

Synonyms
- Podisme Karny, 1907

= Podisma =

Genus of grasshoppers

Podisma is a genus of 'short-horned grasshoppers' belonging to the family Acrididae and the subfamily Melanoplinae.

== Distribution ==
Grasshopper species in this genus are recorded mainland Europe (including Norway, but not the British Isles), the eastern Palearctic realm through to temperate, east Asia including Japan.

== Species ==
- Podisma aberrans Ikonnikov, 1911
- Podisma amedegnatoae Fontana & Pozzebon, 2007
- Podisma cantabricae Morales-Agacino, 1950
- Podisma carpetana (Bolívar, 1898)
- Podisma eitschbergeri Harz, 1973
- Podisma emiliae Ramme, 1926
- Podisma goidanichi (Baccetti, 1959)
- Podisma hesperus (Hebard, 1936)
- Podisma kanoi Storozhenko, 1994
- Podisma lezgina Uvarov, 1917
- Podisma magdalenae Galvagni, 1971
- Podisma miramae Savenko, 1941
- Podisma pedestris (Linnaeus, 1758) - type species (as Gryllus pedestris L. = P. pedestris pedestris)
- Podisma ruffoi Baccetti, 1971
- Podisma sapporensis Shiraki, 1910
- Podisma satunini Uvarov, 1916
- Podisma silvestrii Salfi, 1935
- Podisma syriaca Brunner von Wattenwyl, 1861
- Podisma teberdina Ramme, 1951
- Podisma tyatiensis Bugrov & Sergeev, 1997
- Podisma uvarovi Ramme, 1926
