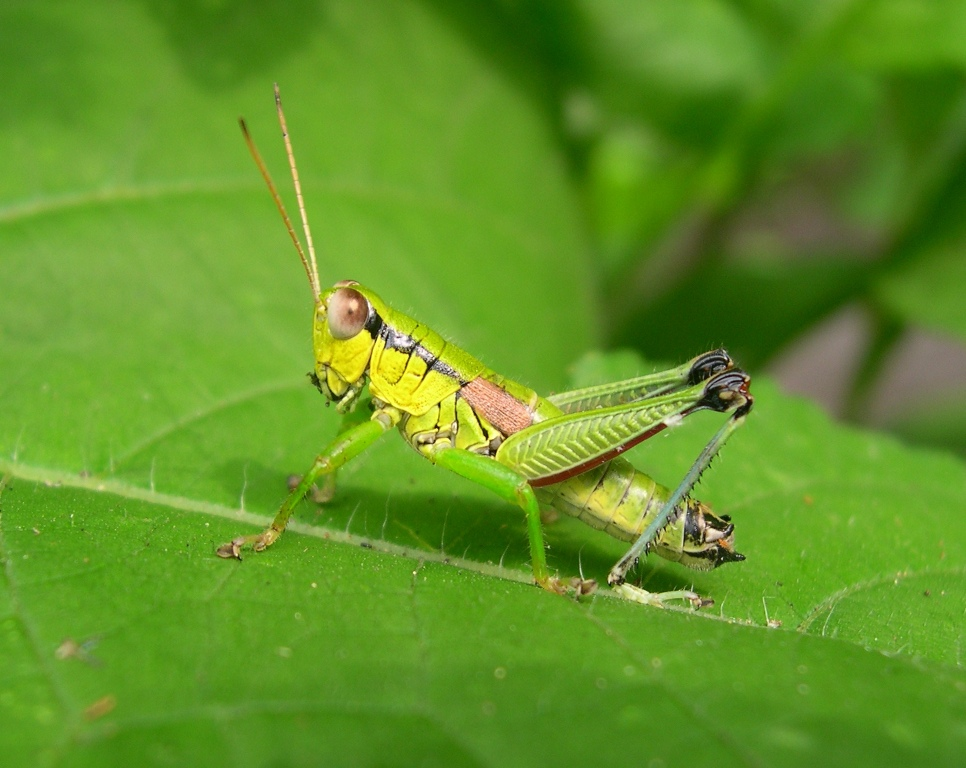
- Adult male of Parapodisma tanzawaensis from the Podismini

Scientific classification
- Kingdom: Animalia
- Phylum: Arthropoda
- Clade: Pancrustacea
- Class: Insecta
- Order: Orthoptera
- Suborder: Caelifera
- Infraorder: Acrididea
- Nanorder: Acridomorpha
- Superfamily: Acridoidea
- Family: Acrididae
- Subfamily: Melanoplinae; Scudder, 1897

Tribes
- See text

= Melanoplinae =

Subfamily of insects

The Melanoplinae are a subfamily of grasshoppers in the family Acrididae. They are distributed across the Holarctic and Neotropical realms. They are one of the two largest subfamilies in the Acrididae. As of 2001 the Melanoplinae contained over 800 species in over 100 genera, with more species being described continuously.

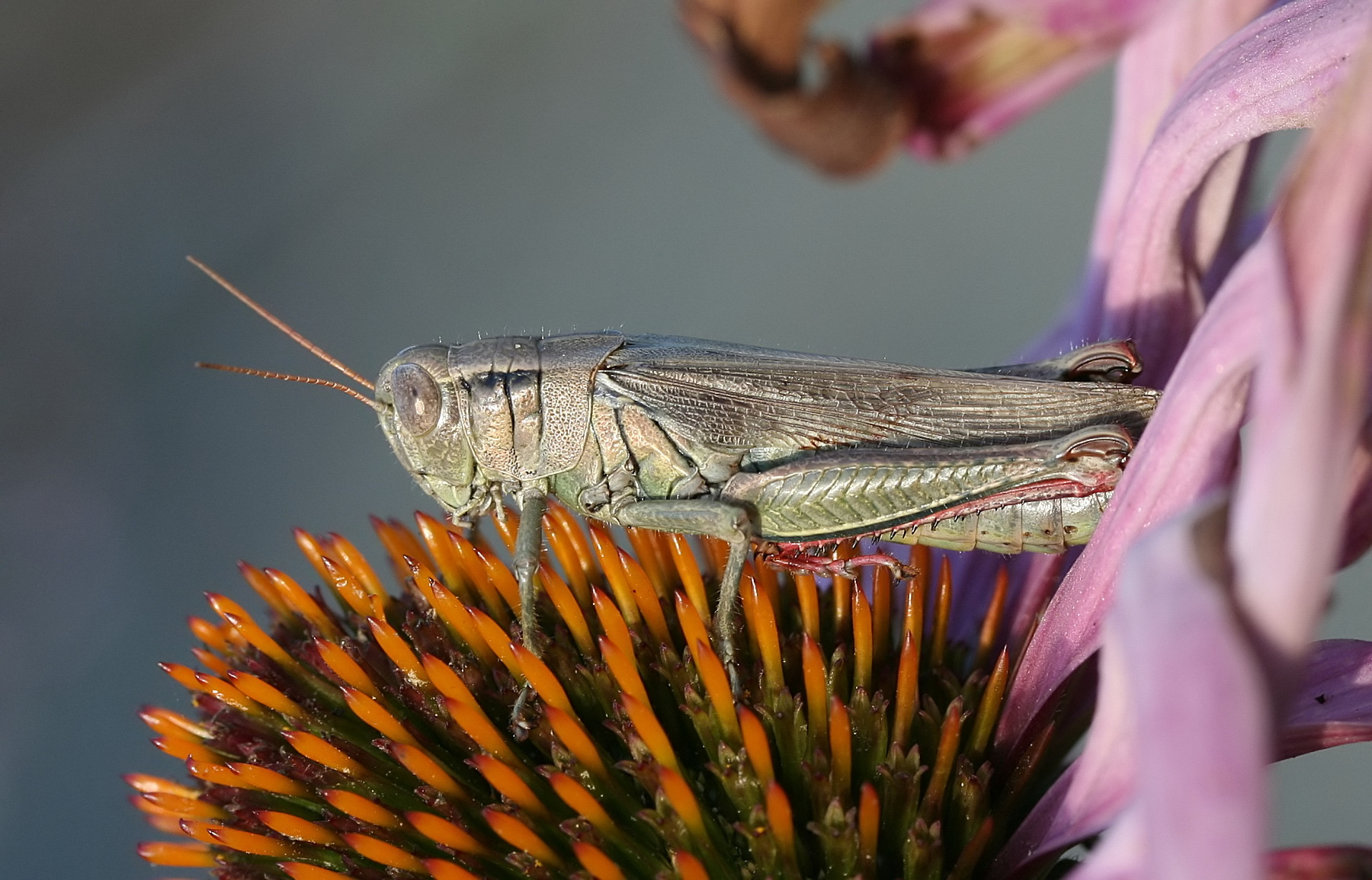
Melanoplus yarrowii

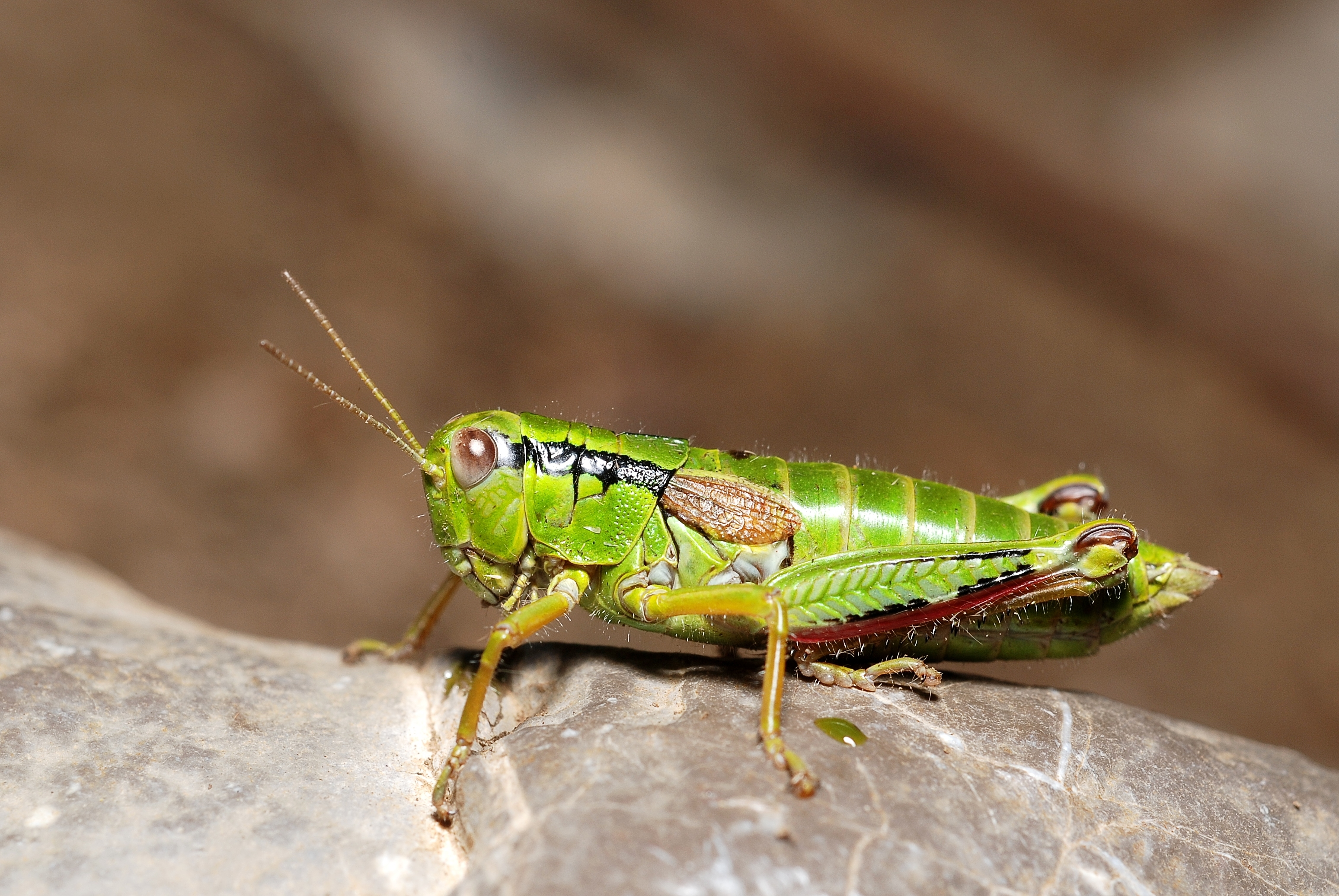
Miramella alpina

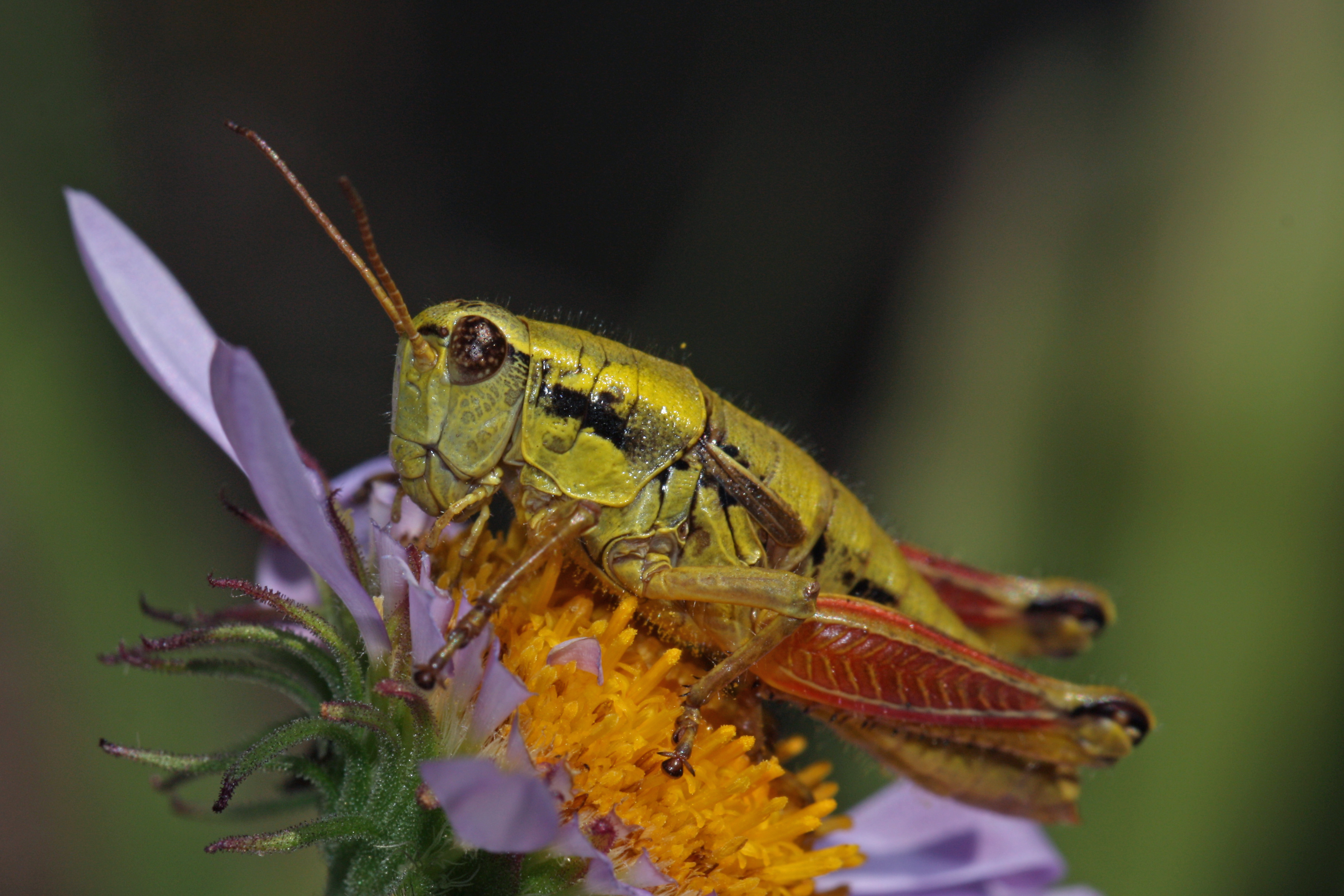
Prumnacris rainierensis

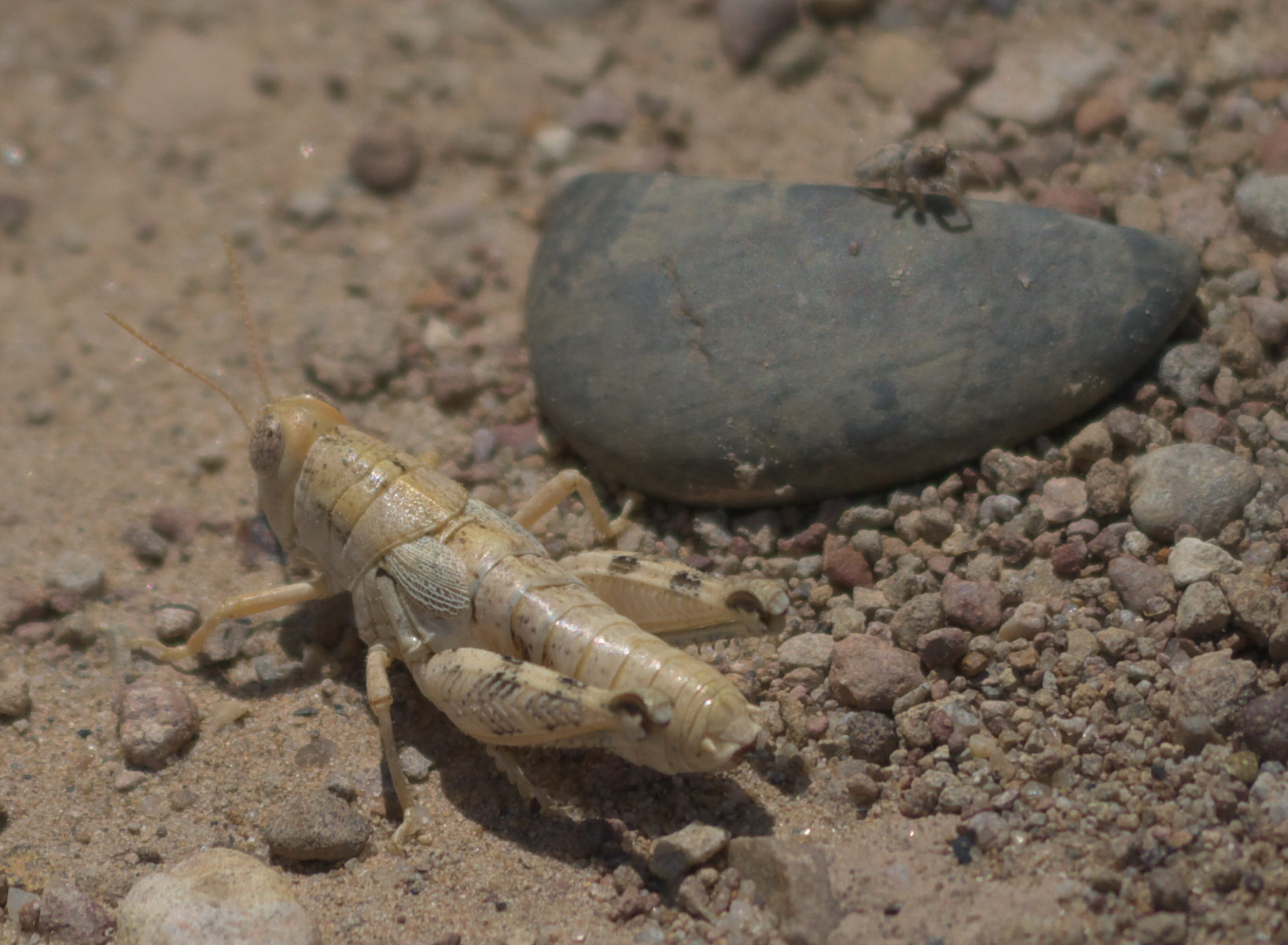
Aeoloplides chenopodii

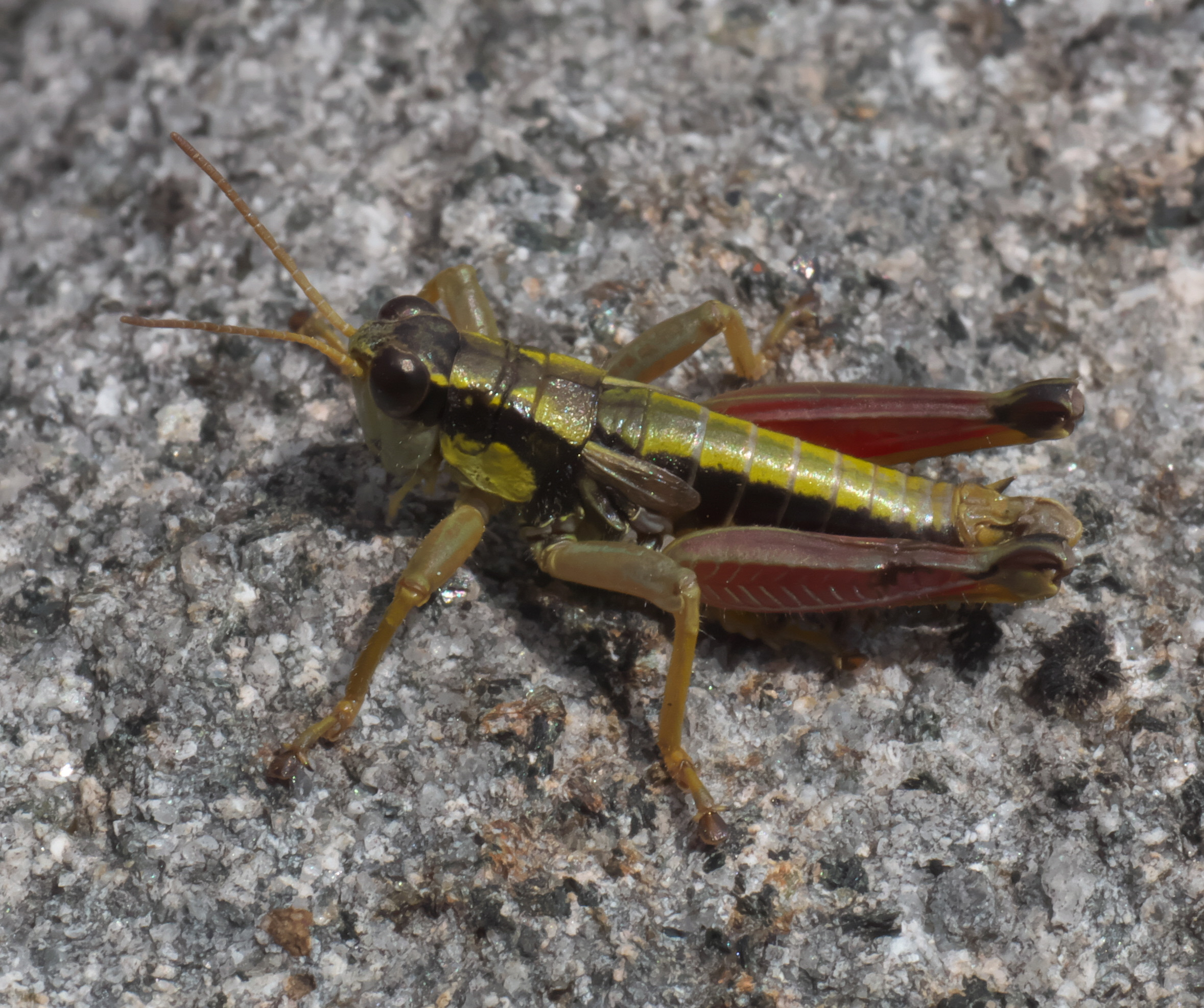
Prumnacris rainierensis

== Tribes and genera ==
The genera of the Melanoplinae are classified in 6 tribes, that include: Conalcaeini (Nearctic), Dactylotini (Nearctic), Dichroplini (mostly Neotropical), Jivarini (Neotropical), Melanoplini (Nearctic) and Podismini (synonym Prumnini: widespread in northern hemisphere).

These genera belong to the subfamily Melanoplinae:

- Aeoloplides Caudell, 1915^{i c g b s}
- Agnostokasia Gurney & Rentz, 1964^{i c g b s}
- Agroecotettix Bruner, 1908^{i c g b s}
- Aidemona Brunner, 1893^{i c g b s}
- Akamasacris Cigliano & Otte, 2003^{s}
- Anepipodisma Huang, 1984^{s}
- Apacris Hebard, 1931^{s}
- Appalachia Rehn & Rehn, 1936^{i c g b}
- Aptenopedes Scudder, 1877^{i c g b s}
- Argemiacris Ronderos, 1978^{s}
- Asemoplus Scudder, 1897^{i c g b}
- Aztecacris Roberts, 1947^{i c g b s}
- Baeacris Rowell & Carbonell, 1977^{s}
- Barytettix Scudder, 1897^{i c g b s}
- Bogotacris Ronderos, 1979^{s}
- Bohemanella Ramme, 1951^{s}
- Boliviacris Ronderos & Cigliano, 1990^{s}
- Booneacris Rehn & Randell, 1962^{i c g b}
- Bradynotes Scudder, 1870^{i c g b}
- Buckellacris Rehn & Rehn, 1945^{i c g b}
- Campylacantha Scudder, 1897^{i c g b s}
- Cephalotettix Scudder, 1897^{s}
- Chibchacris Hebard, 1923^{s}
- Chloroplus Hebard, 1918^{i c g b s}
- Chortopodisma Ramme, 1951^{c g}
- Ciglianacris Cadena-Castañeda & Cardona, 2017^{s}
- Comansacris Ronderos & Cigliano, 1990^{s}
- Conalcaea Scudder, 1897^{i c g b s}
- Cophopodisma Ramme, 1951^{c g}
- Cophoprumna Dovnar-Zapolskij, 1932^{s}
- Coyacris Ronderos, 1991^{s}
- Dactylotum Charpentier, 1843^{i c g b s}
- Dasyscirtus Bruner, 1908^{s}
- Dendrotettix Packard, 1890^{i c g b}
- Dichroplus Stål, 1873^{c g b s}
- Dicranophyma Uvarov, 1921^{s}
- Digamacris Carbonell, 1989^{s}
- Duartettix Perez-Gelabert & Otte, 2000^{s}
- Eokingdonella Yin, 1984^{s}
- Eotettix Scudder, 1897^{i c g b s}
- Epipodisma Ramme, 1951^{c g}
- Eurotettix Bruner, 1906^{c g}
- Emeiacris Zheng, 1981
- Floridacris Otte, 2014^{s}
- Floritettix Otte, 2014^{s}
- Fruhstorferiola Willemse, 1921^{s}
- Genimen Bolívar, 1917^{s}
- Gibbitergum Zheng & Shi, 1998^{s}
- Guizhouacris Yin & Li, 2006^{s}
- Gymnoscirtetes Scudder, 1897^{i c g b s}
- Hazelacris Ronderos, 1981^{s}
- Hebardacris Rehn, 1952^{i c g b}
- Hesperotettix Scudder, 1875^{i c g b s}
- Huastecacris Fontana & Buzzetti, 2007^{s}
- Huaylasacris Cigliano, Pocco & Lange, 2011^{s}
- Hydnosternacris Amédégnato & Descamps, 1978^{s}
- Hypochlora Brunner, 1863^{i c g b s}
- Hypsalonia Gurney & Eades, 1961^{i c g b}
- Intiacris Ronderos & Cigliano, 1990^{s}
- Italopodisma Harz, 1973^{s}
- Jivarus Giglio-Tos, 1898^{s}
- Karokia Rehn, 1964^{i c g b s}
- Keyopsis Ronderos & Cigliano, 1993^{s}
- Liaopodisma Zheng, 1990^{s}
- Liladownsia Fontana, Mariño-Pérez, Woller & Song, 2014^{s}
- Maeacris Ronderos, 1983^{s}
- Mariacris Ronderos & Turk, 1989^{s}
- Maylasacris Cigliano & Amédégnato, 2010^{s}
- Melanoplus Stål, 1873^{i c g b s}
- Meridacris Roberts, 1937^{s}
- Mexacris Otte, 2007^{s}
- Mexitettix Otte, 2007^{s}
- Micropodisma Dovnar-Zapolskij, 1932^{c g}
- Miramella Dovnar-Zapolskij, 1932^{c g}
- Nahuelia Liebermann, 1942^{s}
- Necaxacris Roberts, 1939^{s}
- Neopedies Hebard, 1931^{s}
- Netrosoma Scudder, 1897^{c g b s}
- Nisquallia Rehn, 1952^{i c g b s}
- Oaxaca Fontana, Buzzetti & Mariño-Pérez, 2011^{s}
- Odontopodisma Dovnar-Zapolskij, 1932^{c g}
- Oedaleonotus Scudder, 1897^{i c g b s}
- Oedomerus Bruner, 1907^{s}
- Oreophilacris Roberts, 1937^{s}
- Oropodisma Uvarov, 1942^{c g}
- Orotettix Ronderos & Carbonell, 1994^{s}
- Pachypodisma Dovnar-Zapolskij, 1932^{s}
- Paraidemona Brunner, 1893^{i c g b s}
- Parapodisma Mistshenko, 1947^{c g}
- Parascopas Bruner, 1906^{s}
- Paratonkinacris You & Li, 1983^{s}
- Paratylotropidia Brunner, 1893^{i c g b s}
- Paroxya Scudder, 1877^{i c g b s}
- Pediella Roberts, 1937^{s}
- Pedies Saussure, 1861^{s}
- Peripodisma Willemse, 1972^{s}
- Perixerus Gerstaecker, 1873^{s}
- Phaedrotettix Scudder, 1897^{i c g b s}
- Phaulotettix Scudder, 1897^{i c g b s}
- Philocleon Scudder, 1897^{c g b s}
- Phoetaliotes Scudder, 1897^{i c g b s}
- Podismodes Ramme, 1939^{s}
- Poecilotettix Scudder, 1897^{i c g b s}
- Ponderacris Ronderos & Cigliano, 1991^{s}
- Propedies Hebard, 1931^{s}
- Prumna Motschulsky, 1859^{s}
- Prumnacris Rehn & Rehn, 1944^{i c g b s}
- Pseudopodisma Mistshenko, 1947^{c g}
- Pseudoprumna Dovnar-Zapolskij, 1932^{c g}
- Pseudoscopas Hebard, 1931^{s}
- Pseudozubovskia Zheng, Lin, Zhang & Zeng, 2014^{s}
- Psilotettix Bruner, 1908^{i c g s}
- Qinlingacris Yin & Chou, 1979^{s}
- Radacris Ronderos & Sánchez, 1983^{s}
- Rectimargipodisma Zheng, Li & Wang, 2004^{s}
- Rhabdotettix Scudder, 1897^{i s}
- Rhinopodisma Mistshenko, 1954^{s}
- Sinaloa Scudder, 1897^{i c g s}
- Taipodisma Yin, Zheng & Yin, 2014^{s}
- Tijucella Amédégnato & Descamps, 1979^{s}
- Timotes Roberts, 1937^{s}
- Tiyantiyana Cigliano, Pocco & Lange, 2011^{s}
- Tonkinacris Carl, 1916^{s}
- Urubamba Bruner, 1913^{s}
- Xiangelilacris Zheng, Huang & Zhou, 2008^{s}
- Yungasus Mayer, 2006^{s}
- Zubovskya Dovnar-Zapolskij, 1932^{c g}

Data sources: i = ITIS, c = Catalogue of Life, g = GBIF, b = Bugguide.net. s = Orthoptera Species File
