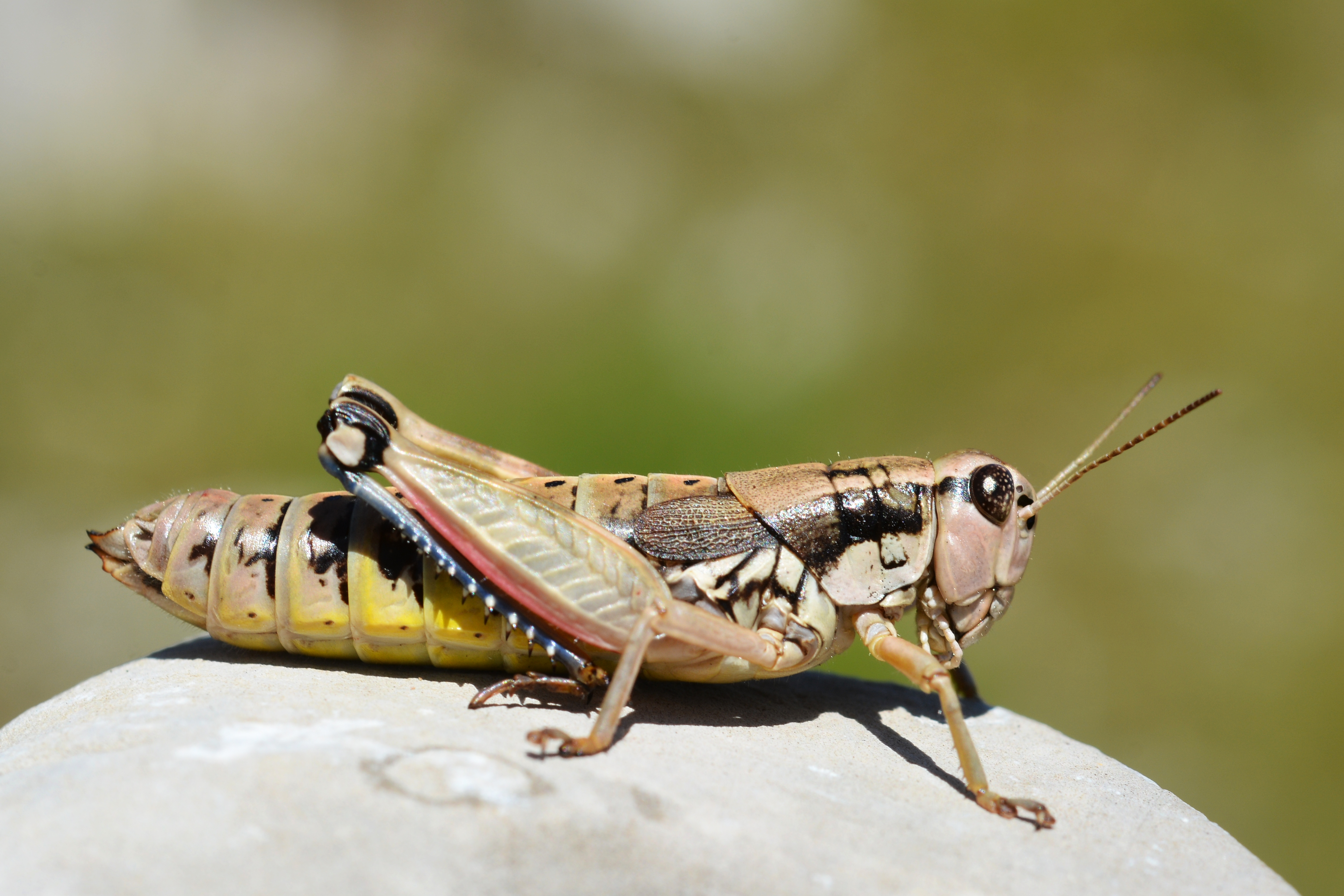
- Podisma amedegnatoae

Scientific classification
- Kingdom: Animalia
- Phylum: Arthropoda
- Clade: Pancrustacea
- Class: Insecta
- Order: Orthoptera
- Suborder: Caelifera
- Family: Acrididae
- Subfamily: Melanoplinae
- Tribe: Podismini; Jacobson, 1905

Synonyms
- Genimenini Li & Yin, 2009; Parapodisminae Inoue, 1985; Podisminae Jacobson, 1905; Primnoae Rehn & Randell, 1963; Prumnini Mayer, 2004

= Podismini =

Tribe of grasshoppers

Podismini is a tribe of "spur-throated grasshoppers" in the family Acrididae. This tribe is unlike others in the subfamily Melanoplinae in that genera are found throughout the northern hemisphere, with a substantial number occurring outside the Americas (although there are about 12 in N. America).

== Subtribes and genera ==
The Orthoptera Species File lists the following:

=== subtribe Miramellina ===
Auth.: Rehn & Randell, 1963; mainland Europe, China, Korea, Japan

- Anapodisma Dovnar-Zapolskij, 1932
- Capraiuscola Galvagni, 1986 - monotypic
- Chortopodisma Ramme, 1951 - monotypic
- Cophopodisma Dovnar-Zapolskij, 1932
- Curvipennis Huang, 1984 - monotypic Curvipennis wixiensis Huang, 1984
- Epipodisma Ramme, 1951 - monotypic Epipodisma pedemontana (Brunner von Wattenwyl, 1882)
- Indopodisma Dovnar-Zapolskij, 1932 - monotypic Indopodisma kingdoni (Uvarov, 1927)
- Italopodisma Harz, 1973
- Miramella Dovnar-Zapolskij, 1932

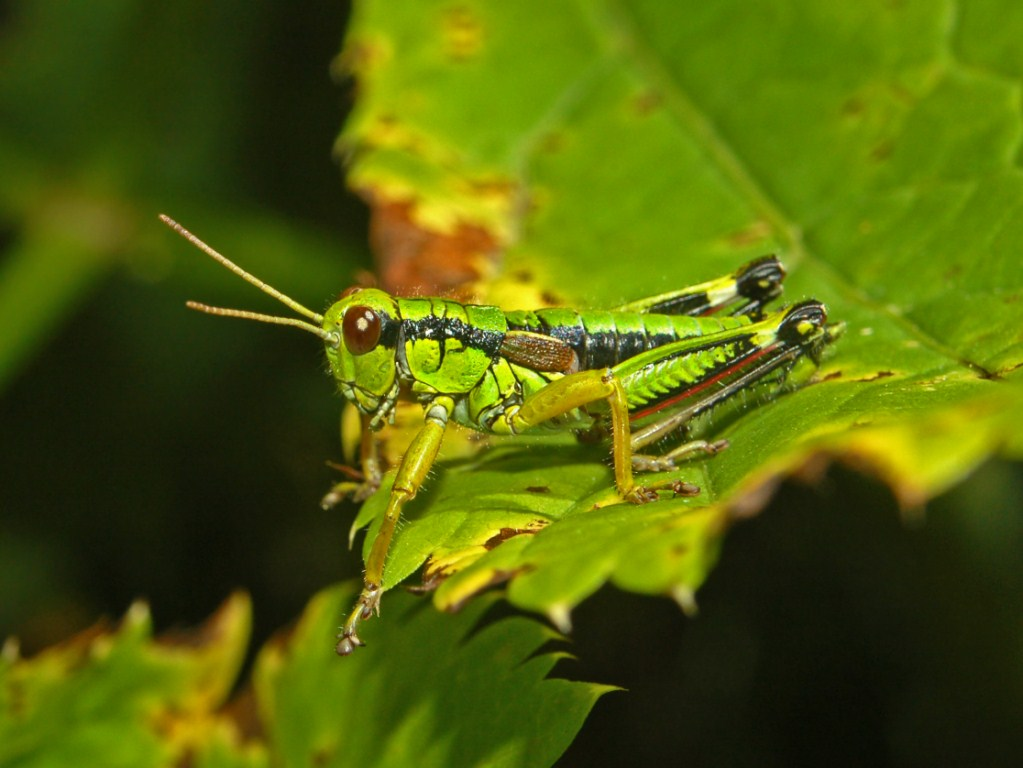
Miramella alpina

- Nadigella Galvagni, 1986 - monotypic Nadigella formosanta (Fruhstorfer, 1921)
- Oropodisma Uvarov, 1942
- Pseudoprumna Dovnar-Zapolskij, 1932 - monotypic Pseudoprumna baldensis (Krauss, 1883)
- Rammepodisma Weidner, 1969 - monotypic Rammepodisma natoliae (Ramme, 1939)
- Zubovskya Dovnar-Zapolskij, 1932

=== subtribe Podismina ===
Auth.: Jacobson, 1905; N. America, Europe, Asia through to Japan

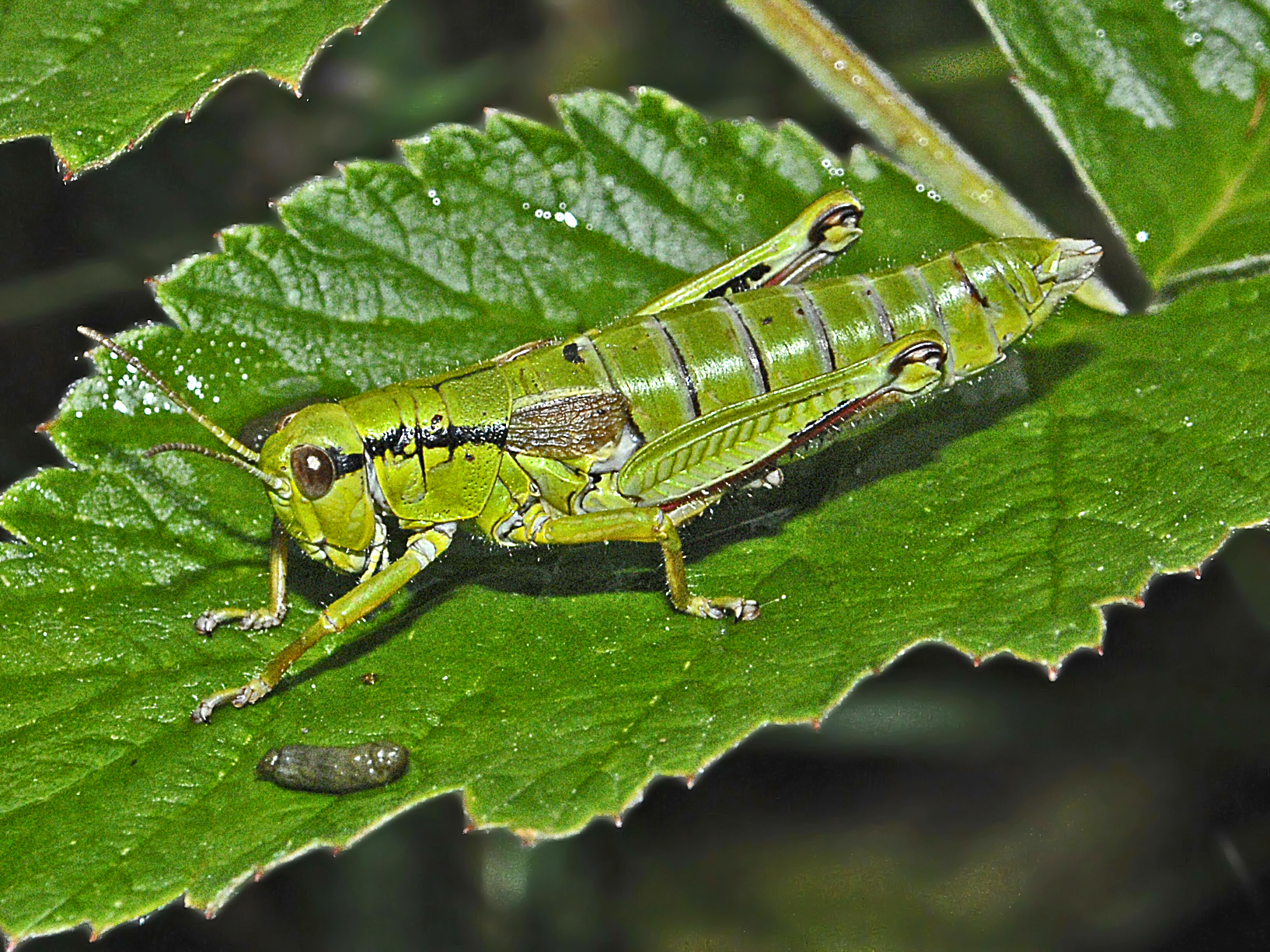
Odontopodisma sp.

- Appalachia Rehn & Rehn, 1936
- Booneacris Rehn & Randell, 1962
- Dendrotettix Packard, 1890
- Micropodisma Dovnar-Zapolskij, 1932
- Niitakacris Tinkham, 1936
- Odontopodisma Dovnar-Zapolskij, 1932
- Ognevia Ikonnikov, 1911
- Podisma Berthold, 1827
- Pseudopodisma Mistshenko, 1947
- Yunnanacris Chang, 1940

=== subtribe Tonkinacridina ===
Auth.: Ito, 2015; Asia

- Fruhstorferiola Willemse, 1921
- Parapodisma Mistshenko, 1947
- Pedopodisma Zheng, 1980
- Sinopodisma Chang, 1940
- Tonkinacris Carl, 1916

=== genus group Bradynotae ===
Auth.: Rehn & Randell, 1963; N. America, E. Asia

- Argiacris Hebard, 1918
- Asemoplus Scudder, 1897
- Bradynotes Scudder, 1880 - monotypic Bradynotes obesa (Thomas, 1872)
- Buckellacris Rehn & Rehn, 1945
- Hebardacris Rehn, 1952
- Hypsalonia Gurney & Eades, 1961
- Kingdonella Uvarov, 1933

=== incertae sedis ===
- Anepipodisma Huang, 1984 (monotypic)
- Bohemanella Ramme, 1951 (monotypic)
- Cophoprumna Dovnar-Zapolskij, 1932 (monotypic)
- Dicranophyma Uvarov, 1921
- Eokingdonella Yin, 1984
- Genimen Bolívar, 1917 - India, Indochina
- Gibbitergum Zheng & Shi, 1998 (monotypic)
- Guizhouacris Yin & Li, 2006 (monotypic)
- Liaopodisma Zheng, 1990
- Pachypodisma Dovnar-Zapolskij, 1932
- Paratonkinacris You & Li, 1983 - E. China
- Peripodisma Willemse, 1972
- Phaulotettix Scudder, 1897
- Podismodes Ramme, 1939 (monotypic)
- Prumna Motschulsky, 1859
- Prumnacris Rehn & Rehn, 1944 (monotypic)
- Pseudozubovskia Zheng, Lin, Zhang & Zeng, 2014 (monotypic)
- Qinlingacris Yin & Chou, 1979 - E. China
- Rectimargipodisma Zheng, Li & Wang, 2004 (monotypic)
- Rhinopodisma Mistshenko, 1954 - Himalayas
- Taipodisma Yin, Zheng & Yin, 2014 - Taiwan
- Xiangelilacris Zheng, Huang & Zhou, 2008 (monotypic)

== See also ==
- List of Orthopteroid genera containing species recorded in Europe
- Ross H. Arnett (30 July 2000). American Insects: A Handbook of the Insects of America North of Mexico. CRC Press. ISBN 978-0-8493-0212-1.
