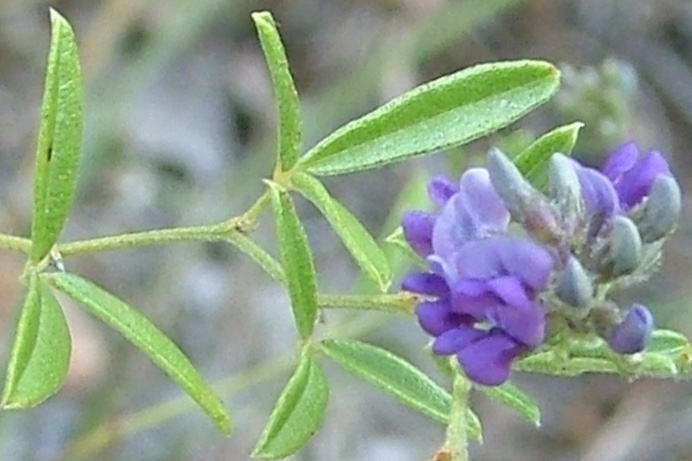

Conservation status
- Secure (NatureServe)

Scientific classification
- Kingdom: Plantae
- Clade: Tracheophytes
- Clade: Angiosperms
- Clade: Eudicots
- Clade: Rosids
- Order: Fabales
- Family: Fabaceae
- Subfamily: Faboideae
- Genus: Pediomelum
- Species: P. tenuiflorum

Binomial name
- Pediomelum tenuiflorum (Pursh) A.N.Egan

Synonyms
- List: Lotodes floribundum (Nutt.) Kuntze (1891); Lotodes tenuiflorum (Pursh) Kuntze (1891); Psoralea bigelovii (Rydb.) Tidestr. (1925); Psoralea floribunda Nutt. (1838); Psoralea obtusiloba Torr. & A.Gray (1838); Psoralea tenuiflora Pursh (1813); Psoralidium batesii Rydb. (1931); Psoralidium bigelovii Rydb. (1919); Psoralidium floribundum (Nutt.) Rydb. (1919); Psoralidium obtusilobum (Torr. & A.Gray) Rydb. (1919); Psoralidium tenuiflorum (Pursh) Rydb. (1919); Psoralidium youngiae Tharp & F.A.Barkley (1946)

= Pediomelum tenuiflorum =

Plant species in the pea family

Pediomelum tenuiflorum, the slimflower scurfpea, is a perennial in the pea family. It is about 2–3 feet (0.6–0.9 m) tall and has a lot of leaves on top. Its leaves can reach a length of 3 inches (80 mm). This flower can be found mainly in the central and southwestern U.S.

== Description ==
Pediomelum tenuiflorum is a much-branched, herbaceous perennial plant growing to a height of 40–100 centimeters (1.5–3.5 ft), but may reach 1.2 m (4 ft). The stems sprout from an underground caudex atop a deep taproot. The stems may grow directly upward or outward for a distance before curving to grow upward. The slender stems have eight or more long sections between nodes and are covered in dense to sparse rigid that lay flat to the surface of the stem giving them a gray green appearance.

The leaves are compound with three to five leaflets that are each 6-40 millimeters long. The lower leaves tend to be palmately compound with five leaflets while leaves higher up are usually have three leaflets, but occasionally have four. The leaves are still present when the plant begins to flower. The short racemes are 1–5.9 centimeters long with between seven and twenty-one indigo colored pea-flowers, each 4.5–6 cm long.

Fertilized flowers are followed by smooth surfaced pods with conspicuous glands each containing one seed. The pods are 7–9 millimeters long and often asymmetrical. When the seeds are ripe the top of the plant dries out and separates and may be blown by the wind like a tumbleweed.

It resembles alfalfa, but has fewer flowers that are also smaller.

== Taxonomy ==
This plant was first described by the German-American botanist Frederick Traugott Pursh who gave it the name Psoralea tenuiflora. It was later transferred to the genus Psoralidium by the American botanist Per Axel Rydberg, becoming Psoralidium tenuiflorum. In 2009, A.N. Egan and J. Reveal proposed placing it in the genus Pediomelum, making it Pediomelum tenuiflorum. The classification as Pediomelum tenuiflorum is accepted by Plants of the World Online, World Flora Online, and World Plants. It is still listed as Psoralidium tenuiflorum by the USDA Natural Resources Conservation Service PLANTS database.

=== Names ===
The species name tenuiflorum, is botanical Latin for "slender-flowered". It has many common names including slimflower scurfpea, slim scurfpea, prairie scurfpea, scurfy pea, scurfy psoralea, gray scurf-pea, and wild alfalfa.

== Range and habitat ==
Pediomelum tenuiflorum primarily grows in the north-central United States, but its range stretches to the Rocky Mountain states, southwest into Arizona, and into northern Mexico. In the Midwest it grows in every part of Kansas, most of Missouri, and much of Nebraska. It is less commonly found in Illinois, and is only found in widely scattered areas of Wisconsin, Iowa, Minnesota, South Dakota, and North Dakota. It grows east of the Rocky Mountains in Montana and Wyoming, and largely to the east in Colorado with it also growing in a few western counties. It grows in almost all of New Mexico and Arizona, but only in the southern portion of Utah. Its range covers most of Oklahoma and many parts of Texas, but is only reported by the UDSA from three counties in Indiana, and one in Kentucky and Mississippi. In Mexico it grows in just three states; Chihuahua, Sonora, and Nuevo León.

A hardy plant that prefers semi-desert, sandy habitats, scrubland, and woodland, Pediomelum tenuiflorum is resistant to drought because of its long taproot.

== Ecology ==
The flowers of Pediomelum tenuiflorum are attractive to bees and are visited by such bees as Svastra obliqua, Colletes willistoni, and Calliopsis andreniformis. The leaf beetle Luperosoma parallelum and grasshoppers such as Melanoplus femurrubrum, Melanoplus foedus, and Melanoplus packardii feed on the leaves, and the larvae of the moth Schinia jaguarina feed on the seed pods.

== Uses ==
There are many traditional uses for this plant. For example, its root is edible either raw or cooked and can also be ground up and used to thicken soups, or mixed with cereals to make bread. The plant can also be used as an ingredient in an alcoholic drink derived from Agave. In traditional medicine, it is used as a treatment for headaches, the flu, and tuberculosis. These treatments involve infusing the roots in a drink or smoking the leaves. In addition, the stems can be used to make a garland to substitute for a sun hat on hot days, and the stems have been used as a fumigant to keep mosquitoes at bay. The Zuni people apply a poultice of moistened leaves to any body part for purification.
