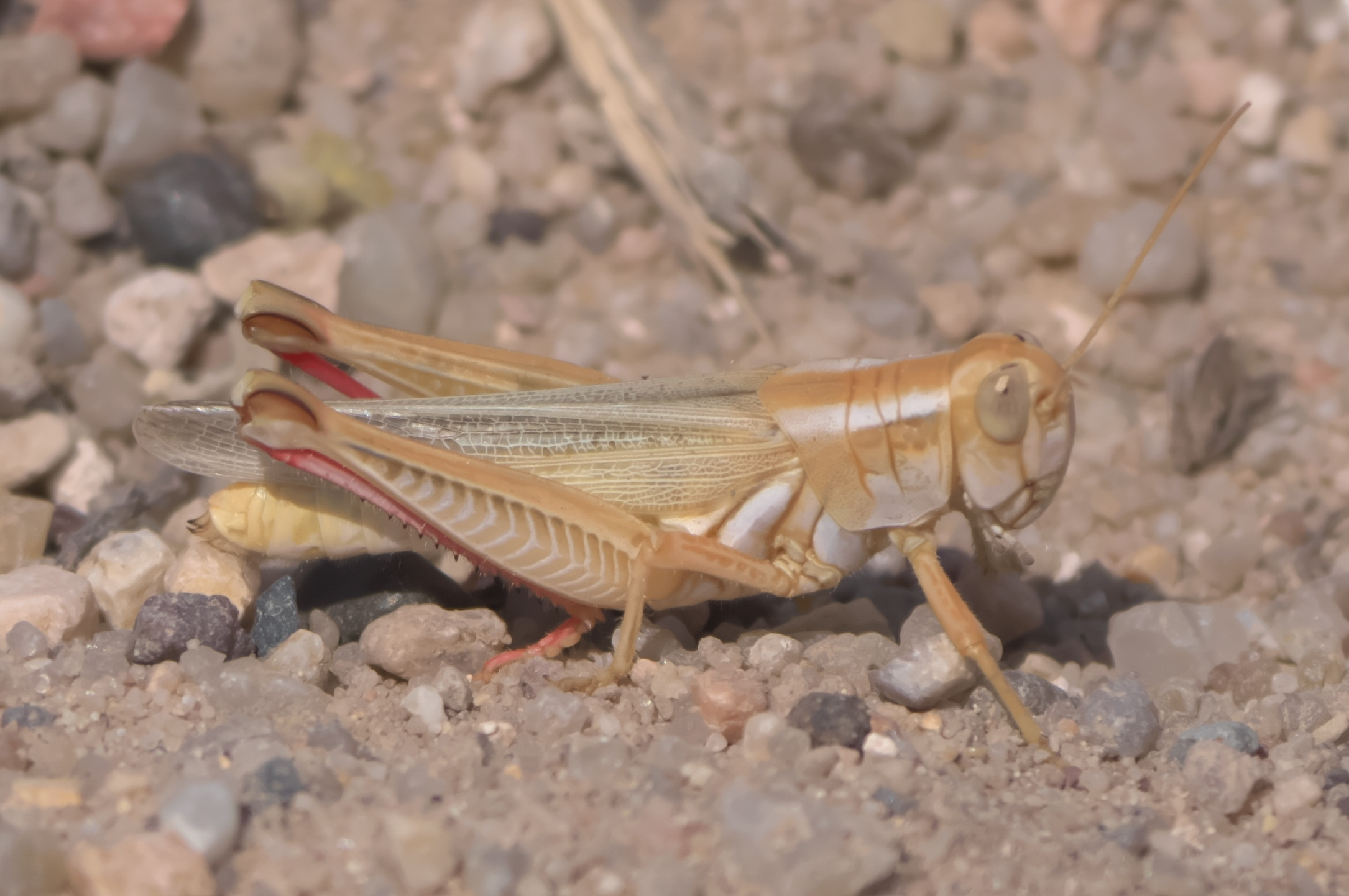

Scientific classification
- Kingdom: Animalia
- Phylum: Arthropoda
- Clade: Pancrustacea
- Class: Insecta
- Order: Orthoptera
- Suborder: Caelifera
- Family: Acrididae
- Tribe: Melanoplini
- Genus: Melanoplus
- Species: M. angustipennis

Binomial name
- Melanoplus angustipennis (Dodge, 1877)

= Melanoplus angustipennis =

Species of grasshopper

Melanoplus angustipennis, known generally as narrow-winged spur-throat grasshopper, is a species of spur-throated grasshopper in the family Acrididae. Other common names include the narrow-winged sand grasshopper and narrow-winged locust. It is found in North America.

== Description ==
A medium-sized grasshopper, measuring 20-30mm in length. Females tend to be larger than males. The slender-winged species can resemble Melanoplus sanguinipes, the narrow-winged grasshopper, and can be distinguished by the cercus, which on M. angustipennis are small and narrowed at the middle. The hind femora are tan or pale yellow and the hind tibiae are reddish or blue.

== Life cycle ==
Narrow-winged sand grasshoppers hatch as nymphs in early to late May. Nymphs develop to adults over the course of 36-42 days, enlarging to their full size and developing wings. The grasshopper adults are active from early July to the end of October. They occur in open sandy grasslands, vegetated sand dunes, and disturbed areas such as roadsides or upland fields from mid-central United States to south central Canada.

== Diet ==
The species is reported to feed primarily on Asteraceae species and other forb species, but will eat grasses and shrubs. Observed forb species from grasshoppers collected in Nebraska include western ragweed, prairie sunflower, western sticktight, cudweed sagewort, blue grama, sand dropseed, and sun sedge. Narrow-winged spur-throated grasshoppers are not a major pest to food crops.
