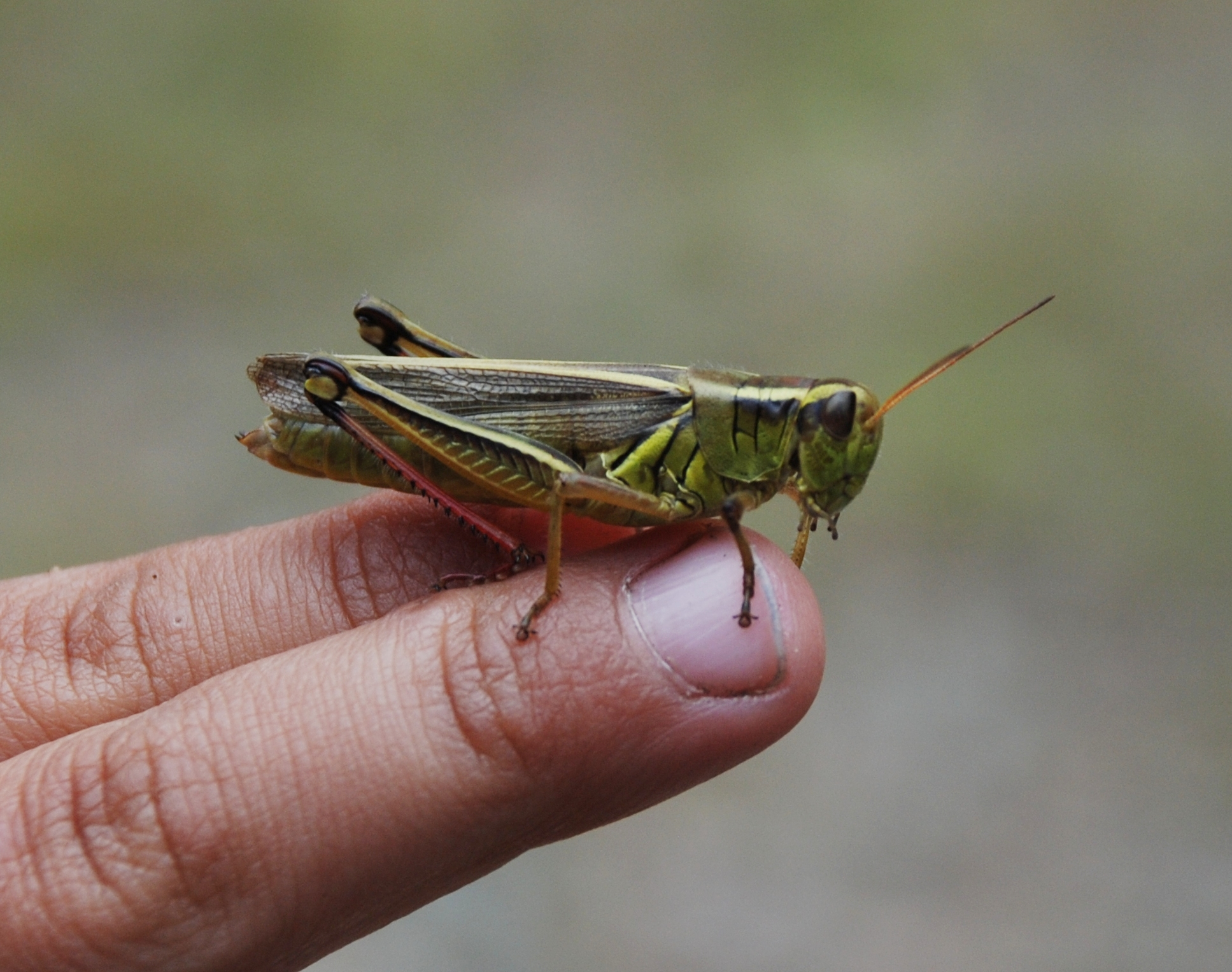
- Female M. bivittatus

Scientific classification
- Kingdom: Animalia
- Phylum: Arthropoda
- Clade: Pancrustacea
- Class: Insecta
- Order: Orthoptera
- Suborder: Caelifera
- Family: Acrididae
- Genus: Melanoplus
- Species: M. bivittatus

Binomial name
- Melanoplus bivittatus (Say, 1825)

Subspecies
- Melanoplus bivittatus bivittatus; Melanoplus bivittatus femoratus

= Melanoplus bivittatus =

Species of grasshopper

Rothwell Fields, Regina, Saskatchewan, Canada

Melanoplus bivittatus, the two-striped grasshopper, is a species of grasshopper belonging to the family Acrididae. It is commonly found in North America, and is especially abundant on the Canadian prairies.

== Identification ==
Melanoplus bivittatus is a relatively large species with sizes ranging from 30 to 55 mm. A pair of pale yellow stripes run along the top of its body from above its eyes to the hind tip of its wings, which gives it the names two-striped grasshopper or yellow-striped grasshopper. The species often has a yellowish green coloration throughout its body due to chromoprotein and carotenoids. The rest of the body looks similar to that of most grasshopper species, with enlarged hind legs for jumping and two pairs of wings, with one set overlapping the other.

== Life cycle ==
During the winter, eggs are laid in the soil and hatch by late April to early May. At optimal conditions (25 °C, very moist), Melanoplus bivittatus eggs will stop developing at around 21 days. Once development stops, the eggs go into a state of diapause, with development continuing again in spring. Once temperatures are warm enough the eggs start hatching; the maximum rate of hatching occurs between the 10th and 13th day. As the grasshopper nymph develops into an adult, it passes through five instars.

== Mating and reproduction ==
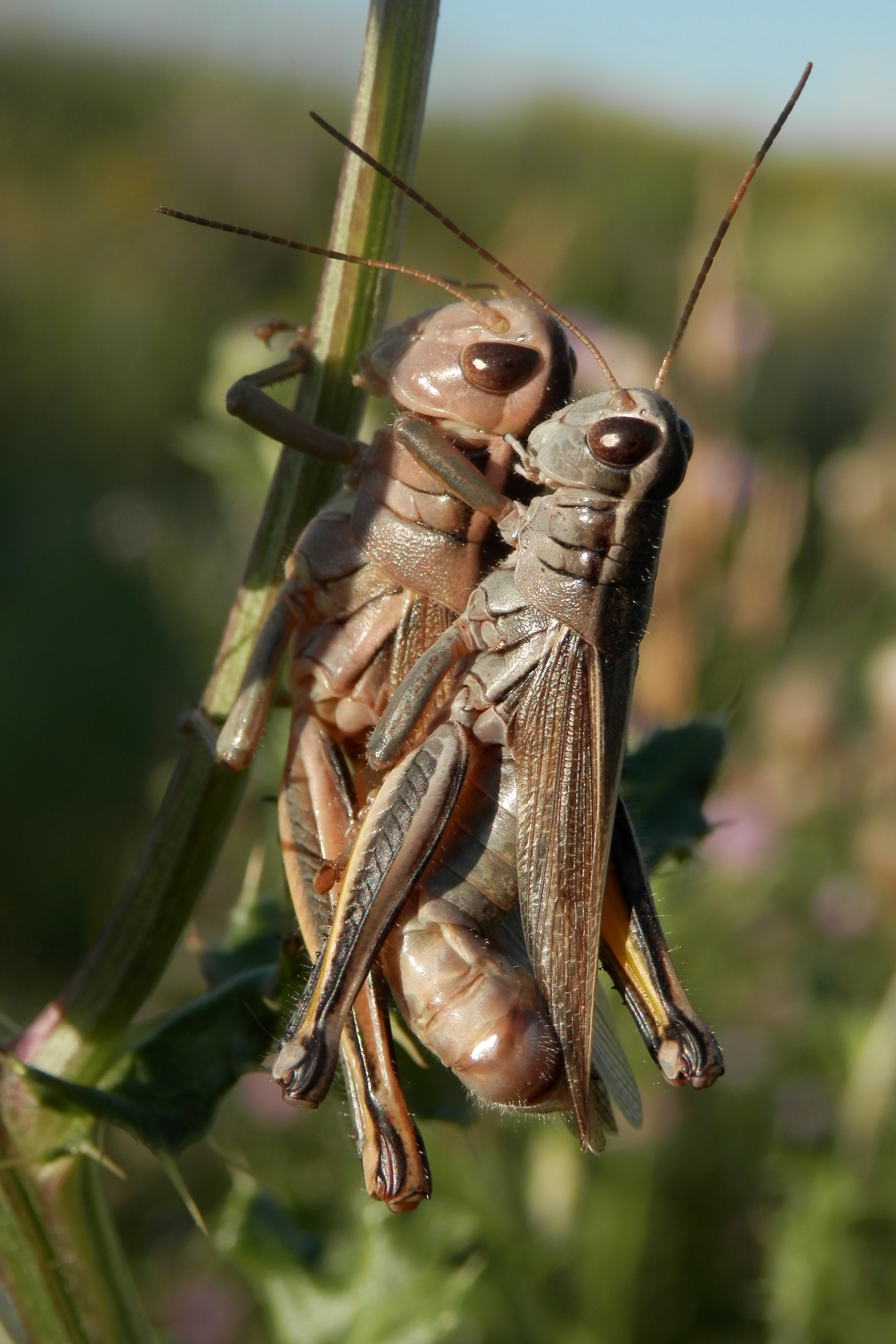
Mating pair of melanoplus bivittatus

Melanoplus bivittatus participate in long hours of mating, with some copulation lasting up to 10 hours. The mating rituals of M. bivittatus are similar to that of red-legged grasshoppers (Melanoplus femurrubrum) in that both species receive and obtain nuptial gifts, in this case spermatophores Spermatophores are provided during the entire copulation period, which tends to be dominated mostly by male activity. Long periods of copulation are productive for sperm and nutrient transfer. Once the females have mated with a male they usually become receptive to remating within four days, but may wait up to 21 days. Females will often refrain from rejecting males due to the benefits gained from the protein and fitness from eating the spermatophore.

== Diet ==
Melanoplus bivittatus are polyphagous, eating a wide variety of plants such as forbs and lentil crops. In times of food shortage, members of this species have been known to cannibalize one another. During times of colder weather (below 25 °C) Melanoplus bivittatus will not feed since fecal production is low and excrement can not be expelled. These grasshoppers require a diet with linoleic acid or unsaturated fatty acids, since these acids keep the organism's wings from crumpling.

== Interactions with humans ==
Melanoplus bivittatus can cause crop damage all through their life cycle. Not only do M. bivittatus damage crops, but they tend to eat the reproductive parts of the plants (sepals, flowers, immature and mature pods), so the likelihood of regeneration or reproduction is slim.
