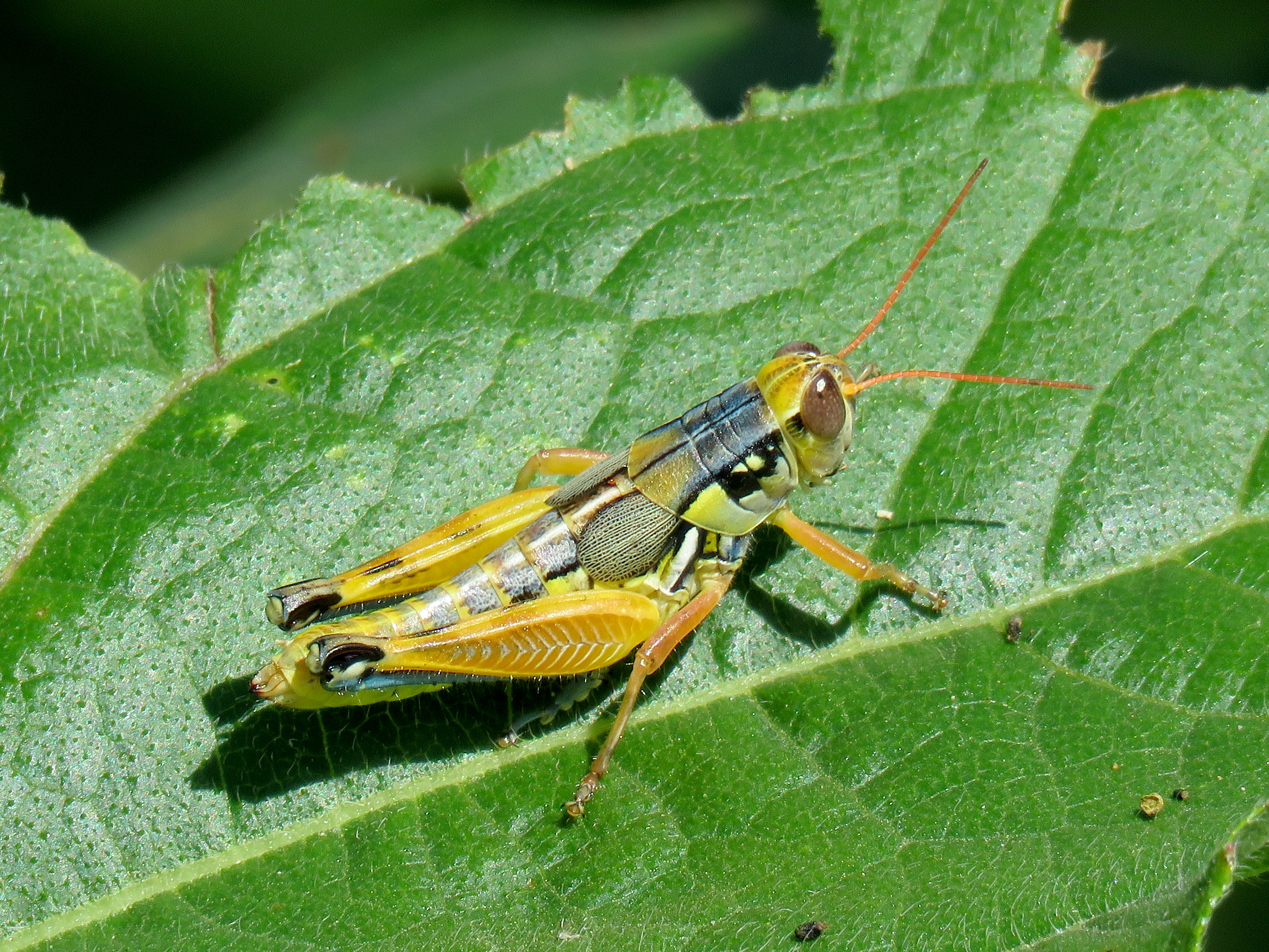

Scientific classification
- Kingdom: Animalia
- Phylum: Arthropoda
- Clade: Pancrustacea
- Class: Insecta
- Order: Orthoptera
- Suborder: Caelifera
- Family: Acrididae
- Tribe: Melanoplini
- Genus: Melanoplus
- Species: M. aridus

Binomial name
- Melanoplus aridus (Scudder, 1878)

= Melanoplus aridus =

Species of grasshopper

Melanoplus aridus, the arid lands spur-throat grasshopper, is a species of spur-throated grasshopper in the family Acrididae. It is found in North America. It is known to feed on Flourensia cernua leaves, among other plants.

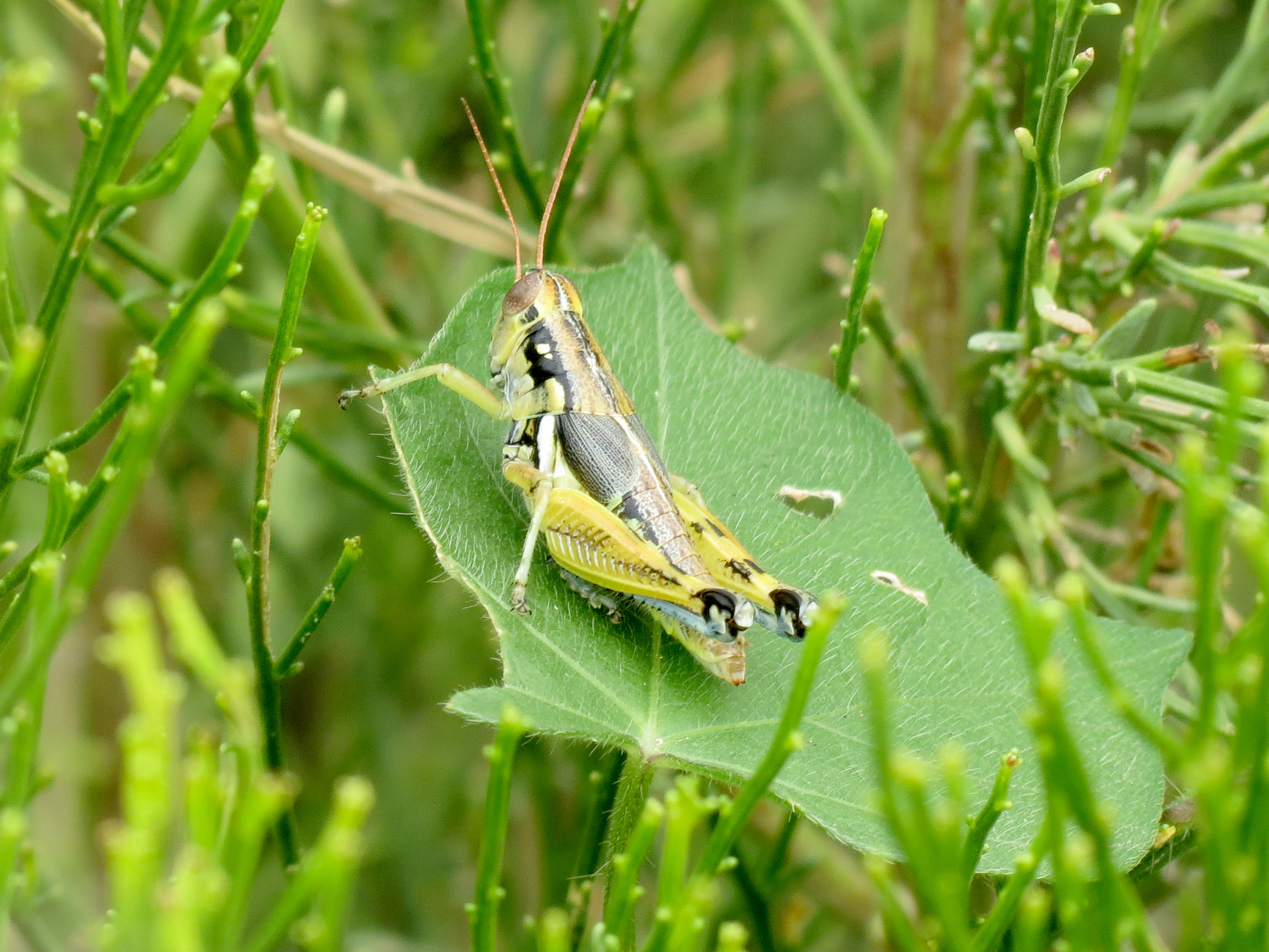
Melanoplus aridus at Texas Canyon Rest Area, Cochise County, Arizona, USA.

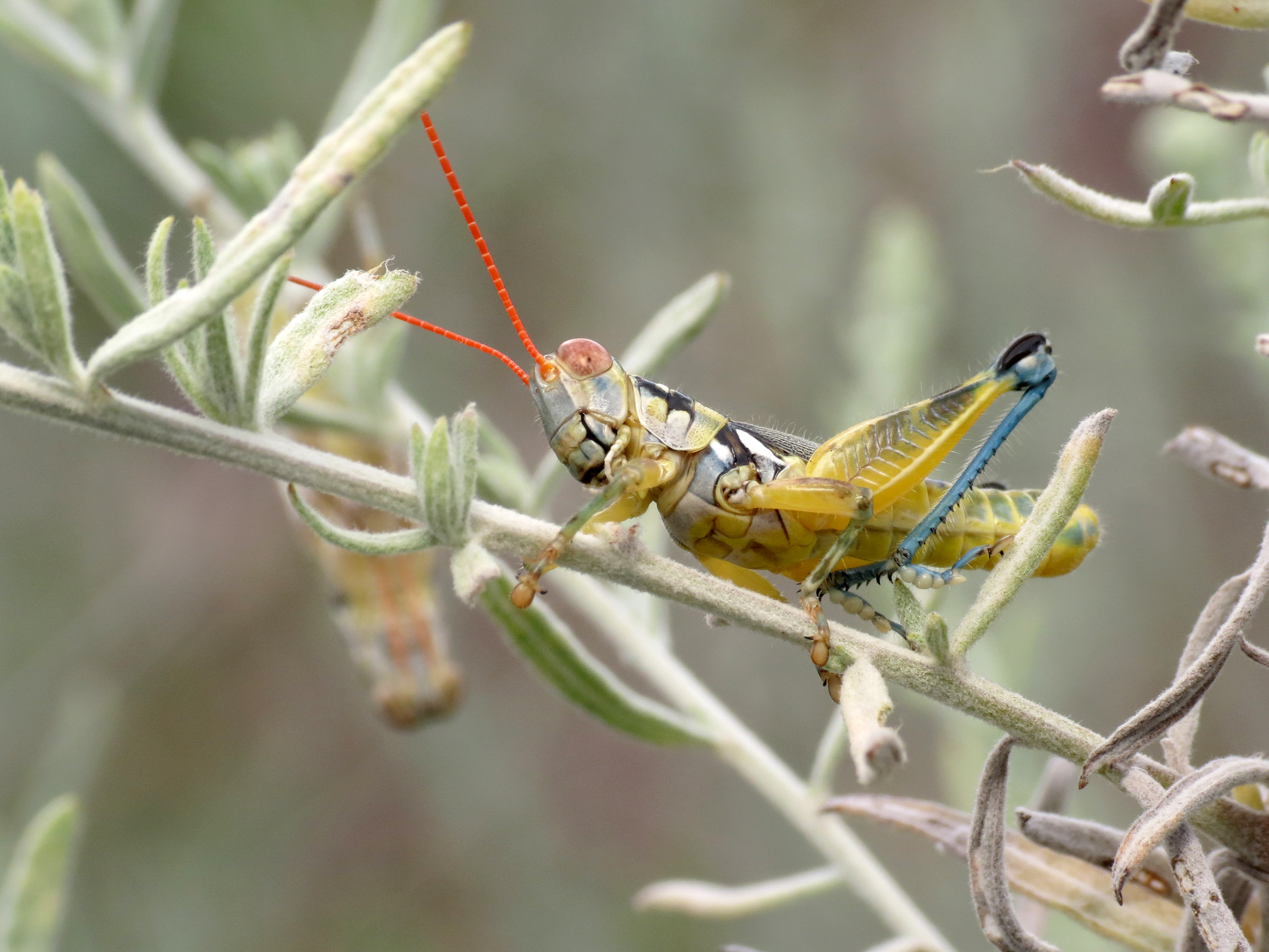
Melanoplus aridus at Peña Blanca, Santa Cruz County, Arizona, USA.

Melanoplus aridus molting
