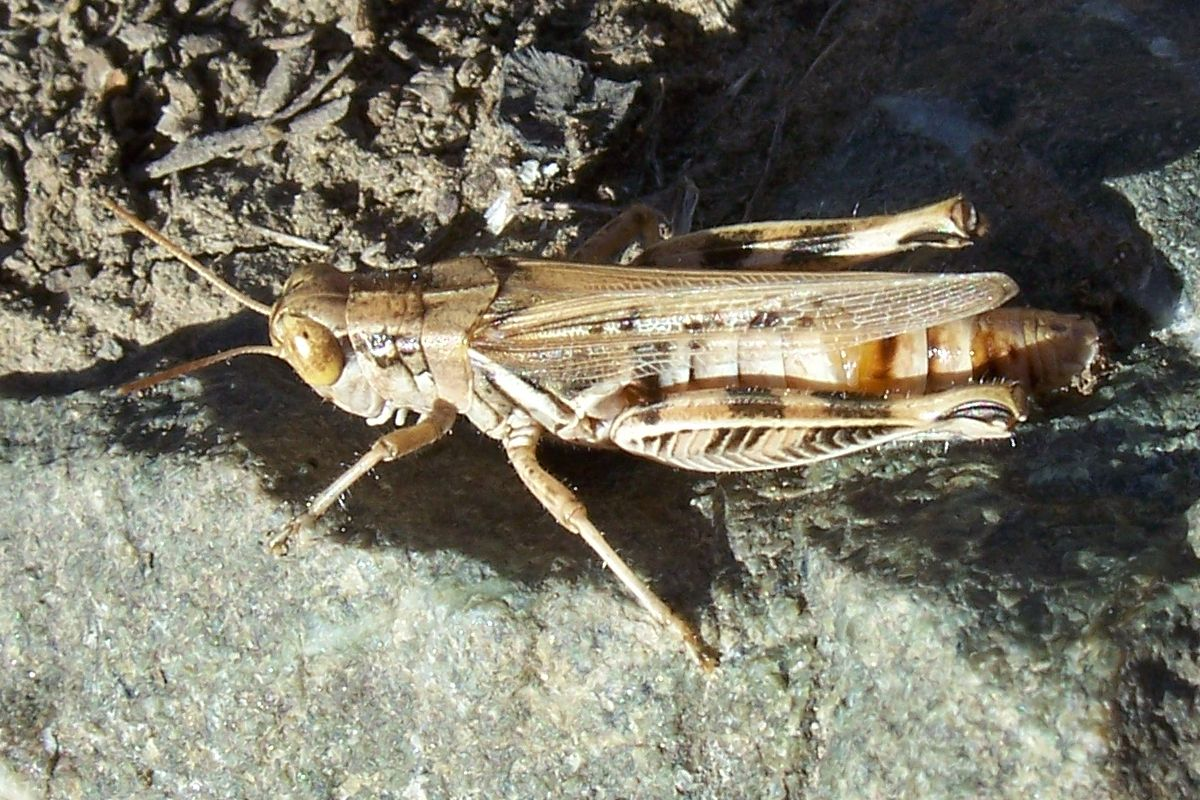

Scientific classification
- Kingdom: Animalia
- Phylum: Arthropoda
- Clade: Pancrustacea
- Class: Insecta
- Order: Orthoptera
- Suborder: Caelifera
- Family: Acrididae
- Tribe: Melanoplini
- Genus: Melanoplus
- Species: M. devastator

Binomial name
- Melanoplus devastator Scudder, 1878

= Melanoplus devastator =

Species of grasshopper

Melanoplus devastator, the devastating grasshopper, is a species of spur-throated grasshopper in the family Acrididae. It is found in North America.

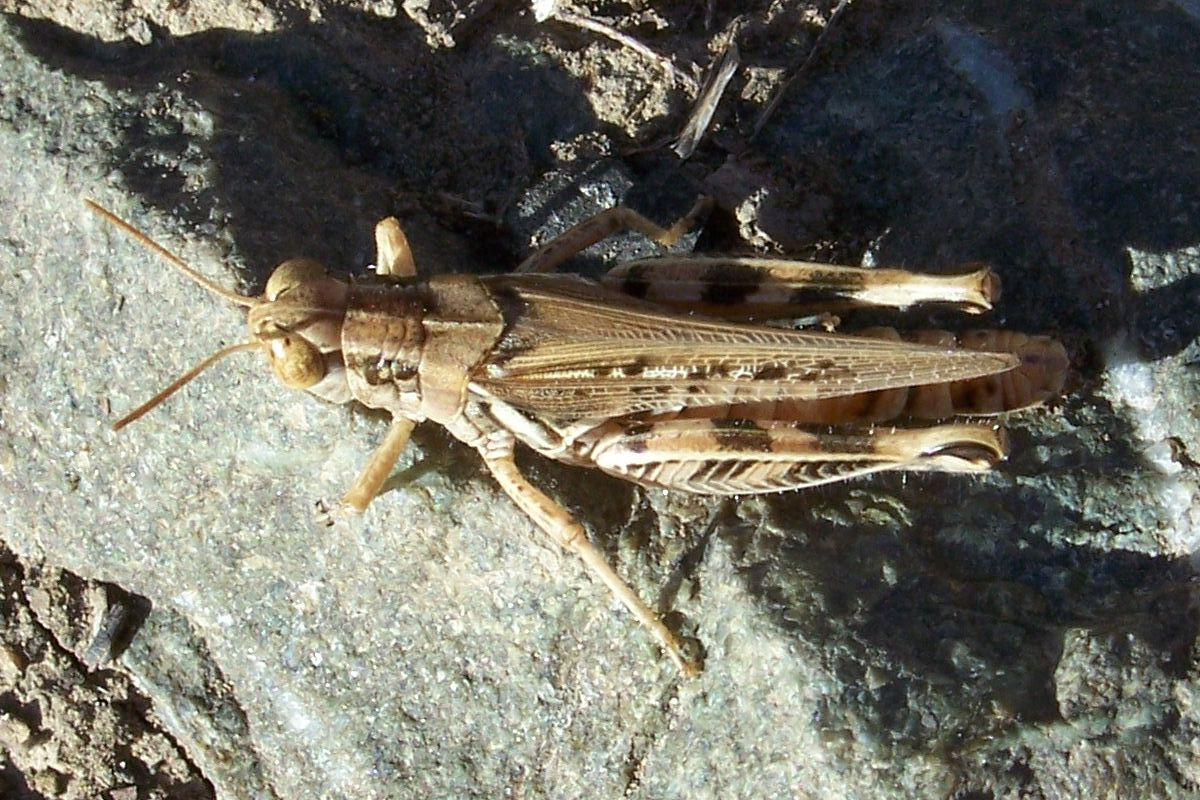
Devastating grasshopper, Melanoplus devastator

== Subspecies ==
These three subspecies belong to the species Melanoplus devastator:

- Melanoplus devastator conspicuus Scudder, 1897^{i c g}
- Melanoplus devastator devastator Scudder, 1878^{i c g}
- Melanoplus devastator obscurus Scudder, 1897^{i c g}

Data sources: i = ITIS, c = Catalogue of Life, g = GBIF, b = Bugguide.net
