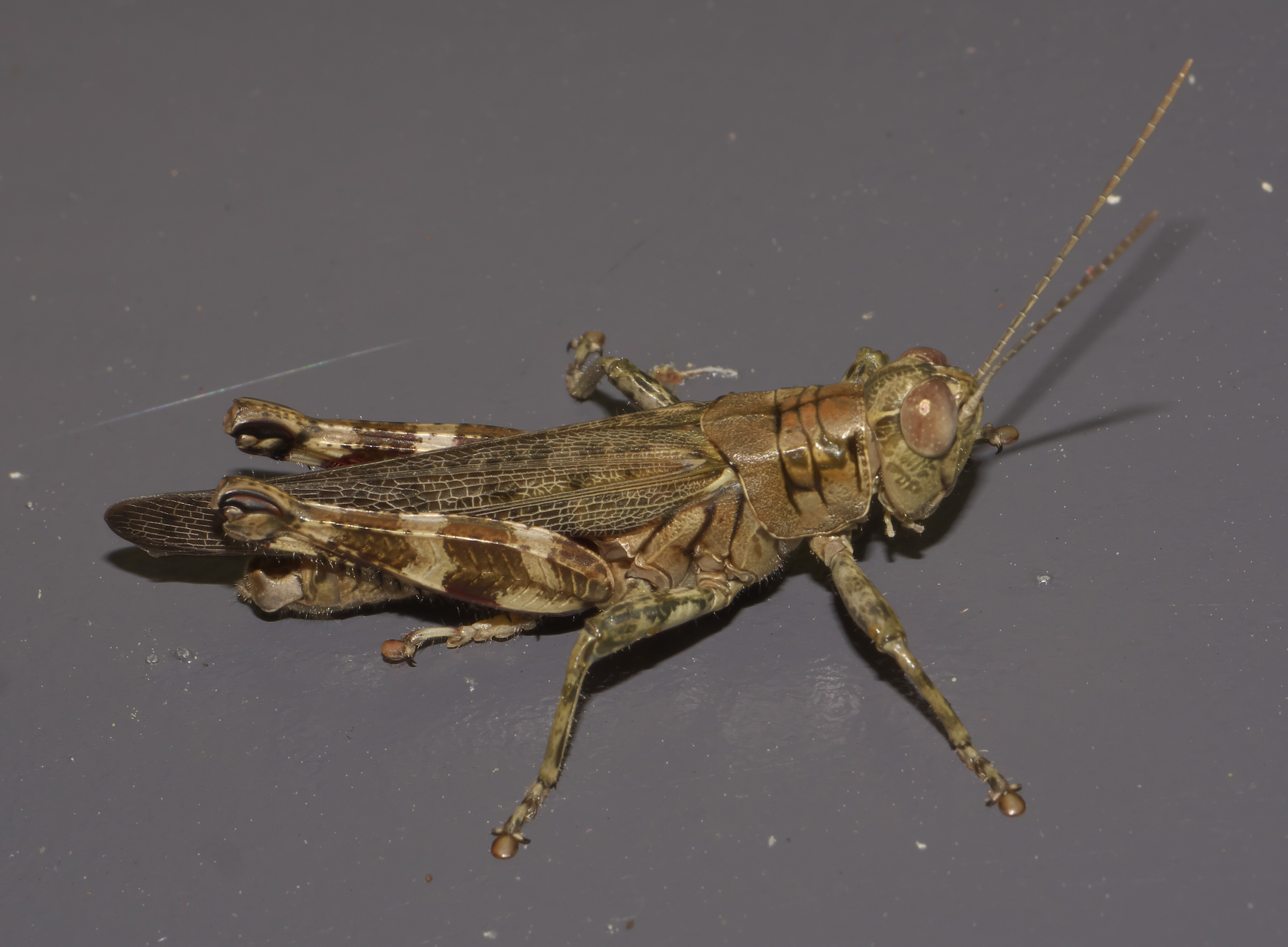

Conservation status
- Secure (NatureServe)

Scientific classification
- Kingdom: Animalia
- Phylum: Arthropoda
- Clade: Pancrustacea
- Class: Insecta
- Order: Orthoptera
- Suborder: Caelifera
- Family: Acrididae
- Tribe: Melanoplini
- Genus: Melanoplus
- Species: M. punctulatus

Binomial name
- Melanoplus punctulatus (Scudder, 1863)

= Melanoplus punctulatus =

Species of grasshopper

Melanoplus punctulatus, known generally as the pine tree spur-throat grasshopper or grizzly spur-throat grasshopper, is a species of spur-throated grasshopper in the family Acrididae. It is found in Eastern North America.

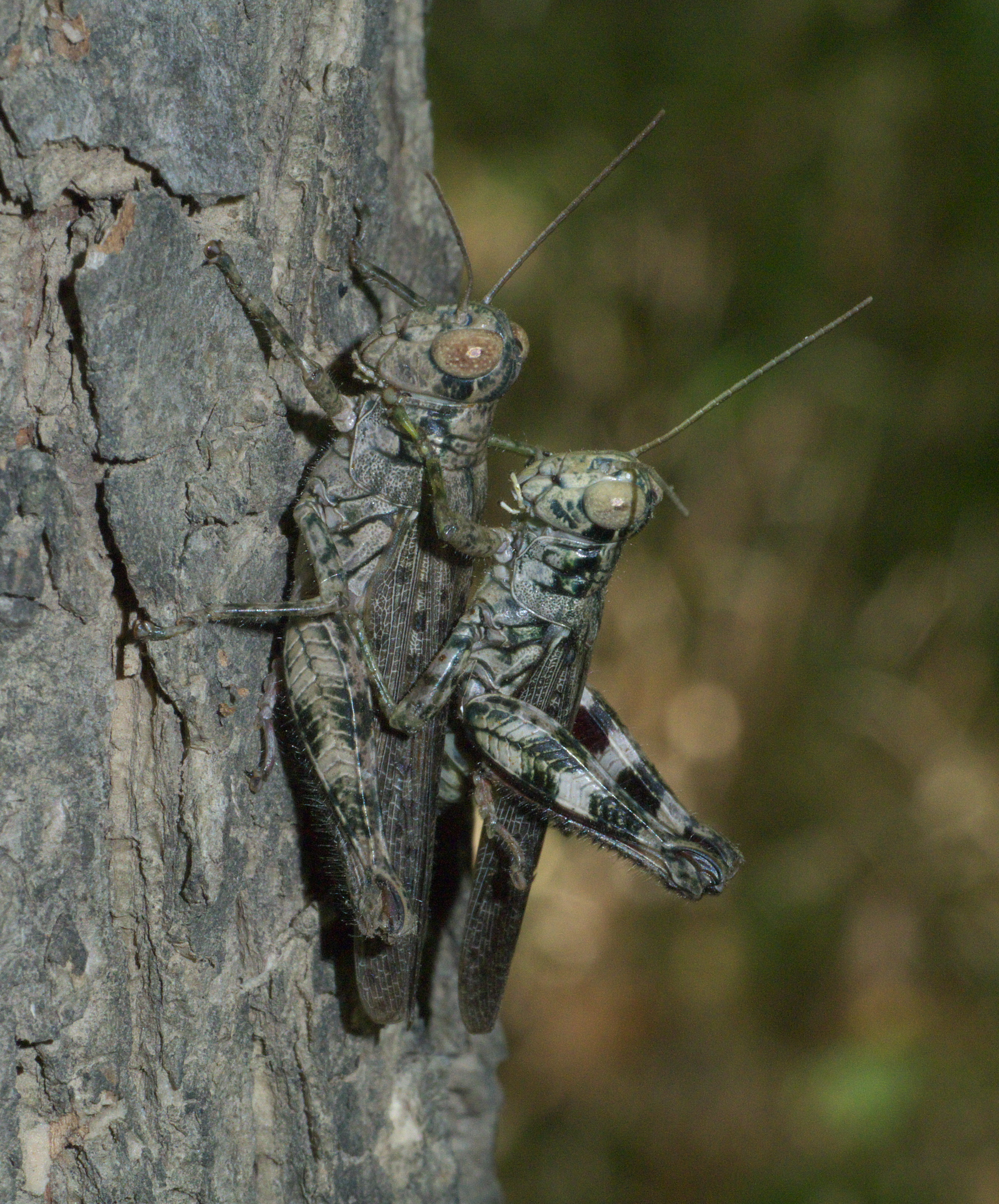
Two specimens in lateral view

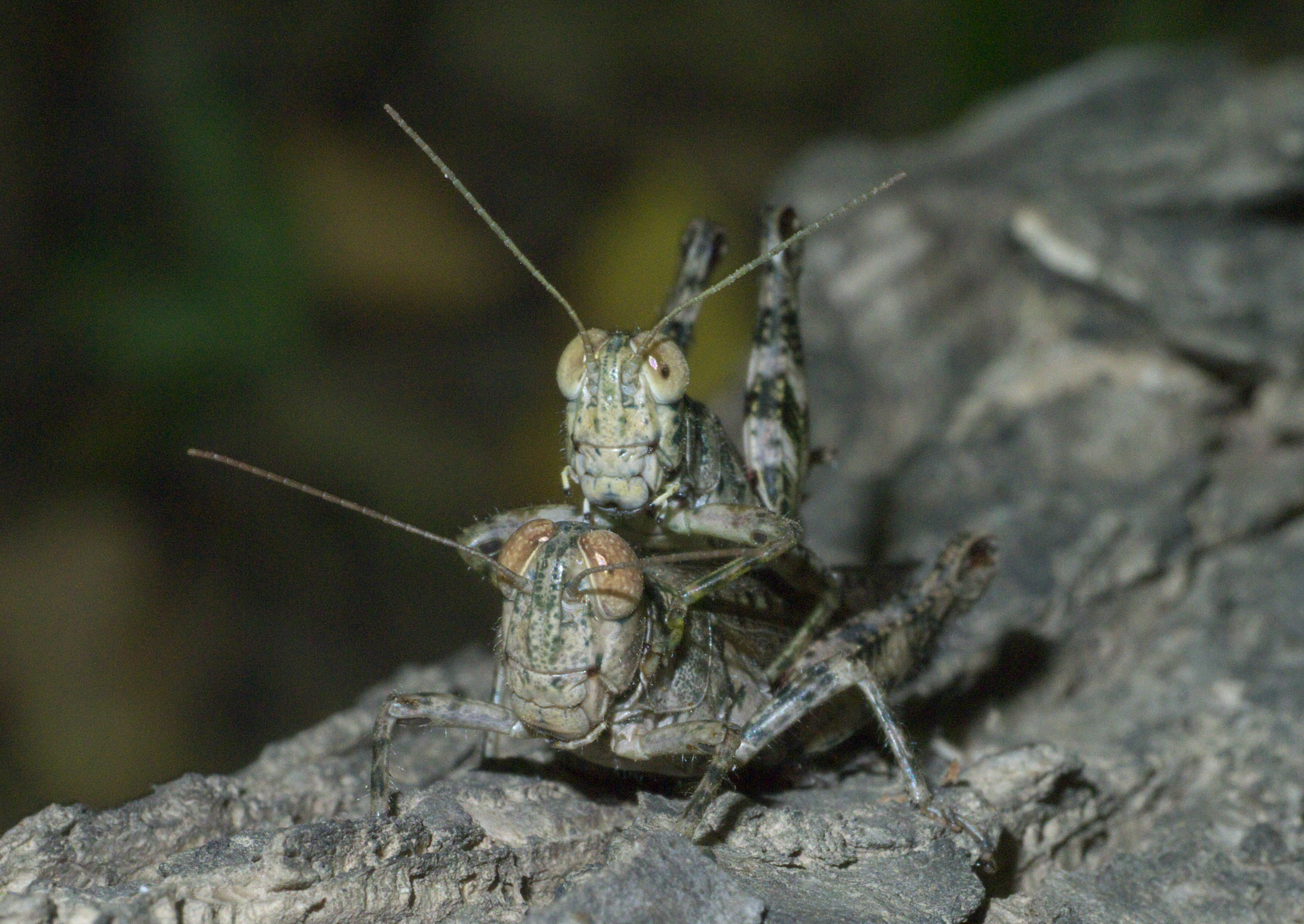
Ditto, anterior view

== Subspecies ==
These three subspecies belong to the species Melanoplus punctulatus:

- Melanoplus punctulatus arboreus Scudder, 1897^{i c g}
- Melanoplus punctulatus griseus (Thomas, 1872)^{i c g}
- Melanoplus punctulatus punctulatus (Scudder, 1863)^{i c g}

Data sources: i = ITIS, c = Catalogue of Life, g = GBIF, b = Bugguide.net
