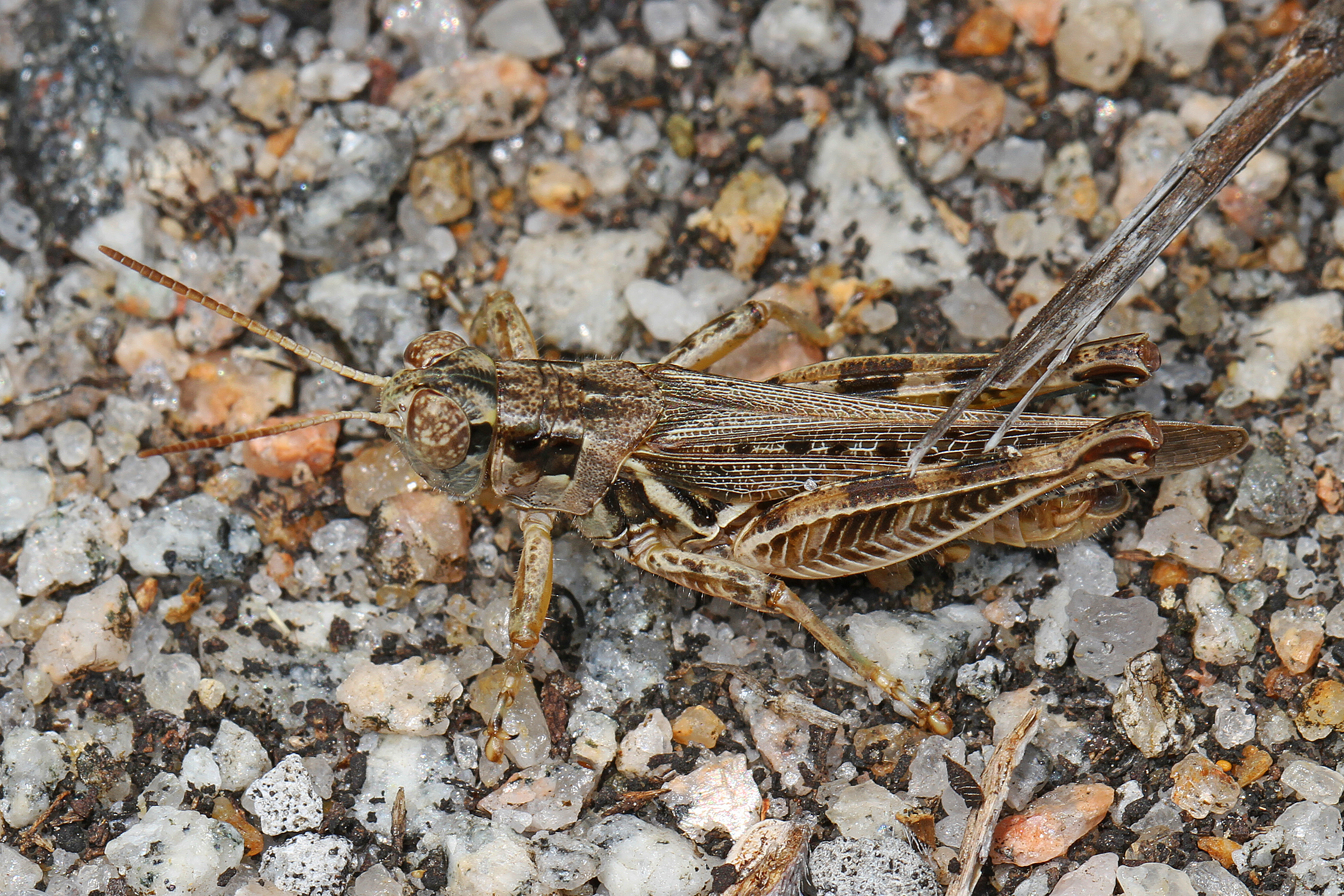
- Melanoplus bispinosus, Harris Neck National Wildlife Refuge, Townsend, Georgia

Scientific classification
- Kingdom: Animalia
- Phylum: Arthropoda
- Clade: Pancrustacea
- Class: Insecta
- Order: Orthoptera
- Suborder: Caelifera
- Family: Acrididae
- Genus: Melanoplus
- Species: M. bispinosus

Binomial name
- Melanoplus bispinosus Scudder, 1897

= Melanoplus bispinosus =

Species of grasshopper

Melanoplus bispinosus, the two-spined spurthroated grasshopper, is a species of grasshopper belonging to the genus Melanoplus. This grasshopper is native to the United States.

== Distribution and habitat ==
Melanoplus bispinosus is commonly found in the southeastern United States, in states such as Florida, Alabama, and Georgia. This grasshopper can be found in woody habitats, but it is associated more with open and disturbed areas. These disturbed areas are usually found in roadside areas or fields in the first stage of ecological succession. These areas are typically dominated by grasses and forbs. Adults can be found throughout the summer and into the fall.

== Diet ==
These grasshoppers are mixed feeders, so their diet consists mainly of grasses and forbs, which are readily available in their habitat.

== Identification ==
This grasshopper is medium-sized and is a grayish-brown to reddish-brown color. There is a dark stripe that extends from the eye to the lateral lobe of the pronotum. There is a row of dark spots on the forewing that extends to the top of the abdomen. The hind femora (third segment of leg) have large dark spots or bands and the hind tibiae (fourth segment of leg) is blue or blue-green. The body length of a male is approximately 24.5 mm and a female is approximately 31.5 mm. This grasshopper gets its name from the presence of a large spine-like furcula. In males, the extensions of the furcula extend to one-half the length of the supra-anal plate and are slightly divergent. The cerci are elongated, narrow in the middle, and rounded at the end.
