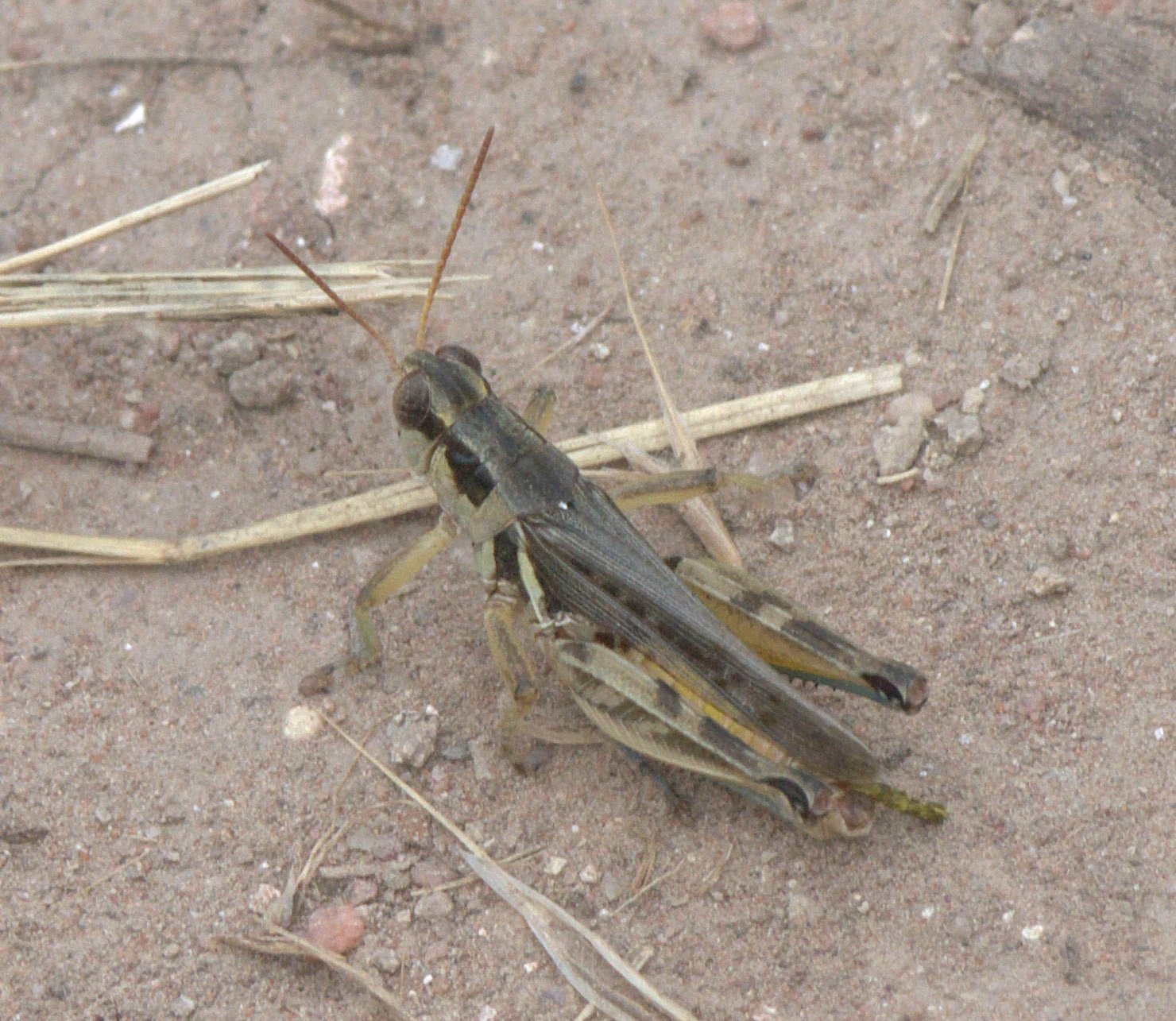
- Melanoplus glaucipes, glaucus-legged spur-throat grasshopper, Texas

Scientific classification
- Kingdom: Animalia
- Phylum: Arthropoda
- Clade: Pancrustacea
- Class: Insecta
- Order: Orthoptera
- Suborder: Caelifera
- Family: Acrididae
- Subfamily: Melanoplinae
- Tribe: Melanoplini
- Genus: Melanoplus
- Species: M. confusus

Binomial name
- Melanoplus confusus Scudder, 1897

Synonyms
- Caloptenus minor Scudder, 1875; Melanoplus mutatus Caudell, 1916

= Melanoplus confusus =

Species of grasshopper

Melanoplus confusus, known generally as pasture grasshopper, is a species of short-horned grasshopper in the subfamily Melanoplinae. Other common names include the pasture spur-throat grasshopper and little pasture locust. It is found in North America.
