= Melanoplus quercicola =

Scientific classification
- Kingdom: Animalia
- Phylum: Arthropoda
- Clade: Pancrustacea
- Class: Insecta
- Order: Orthoptera
- Suborder: Caelifera
- Family: Acrididae
- Genus: Melanoplus
- Species: M. quercicola

Binomial name
- Melanoplus quercicola (Hebard, 1918)

Species of grasshopper

Melanoplus quercicola is a species of grasshopper in the subfamily Melanoplinae ("spur-throated grasshoppers"), in the family Acrididae ("short-horned grasshoppers"). The species is known generally as the "oak-loving short-wing grasshopper" or "oak-loving locust". It is found in North America.
