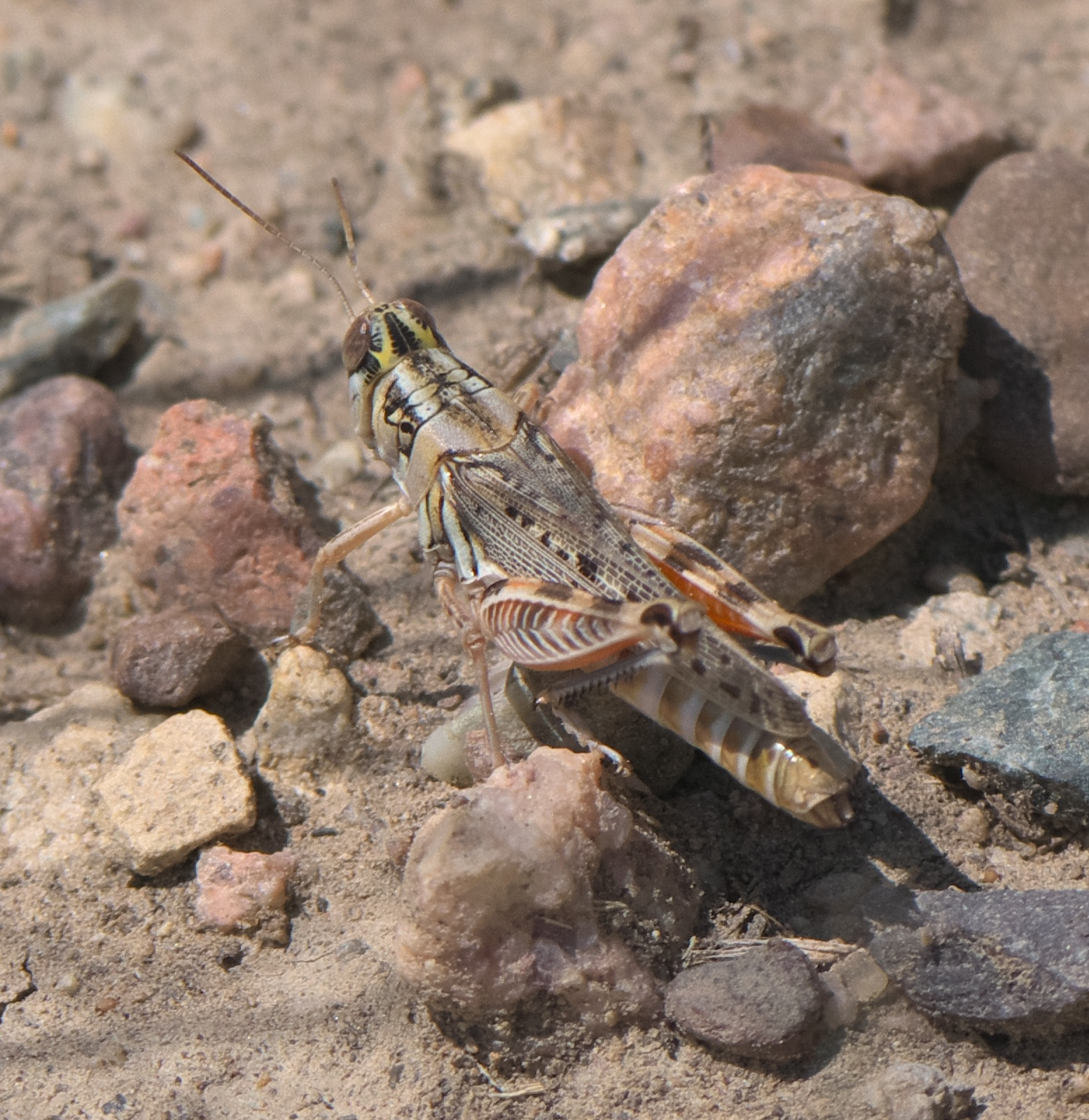
- Melanoplus occidentalis, flabellate grasshopper, Colorado

Scientific classification
- Kingdom: Animalia
- Phylum: Arthropoda
- Clade: Pancrustacea
- Class: Insecta
- Order: Orthoptera
- Suborder: Caelifera
- Family: Acrididae
- Tribe: Melanoplini
- Genus: Melanoplus
- Species: M. occidentalis

Binomial name
- Melanoplus occidentalis (Thomas, 1872)

= Melanoplus occidentalis =

Species of grasshopper

Melanoplus occidentalis, the flabellate grasshopper, is a species of spur-throated grasshopper in the family Acrididae. It's found in North America.
