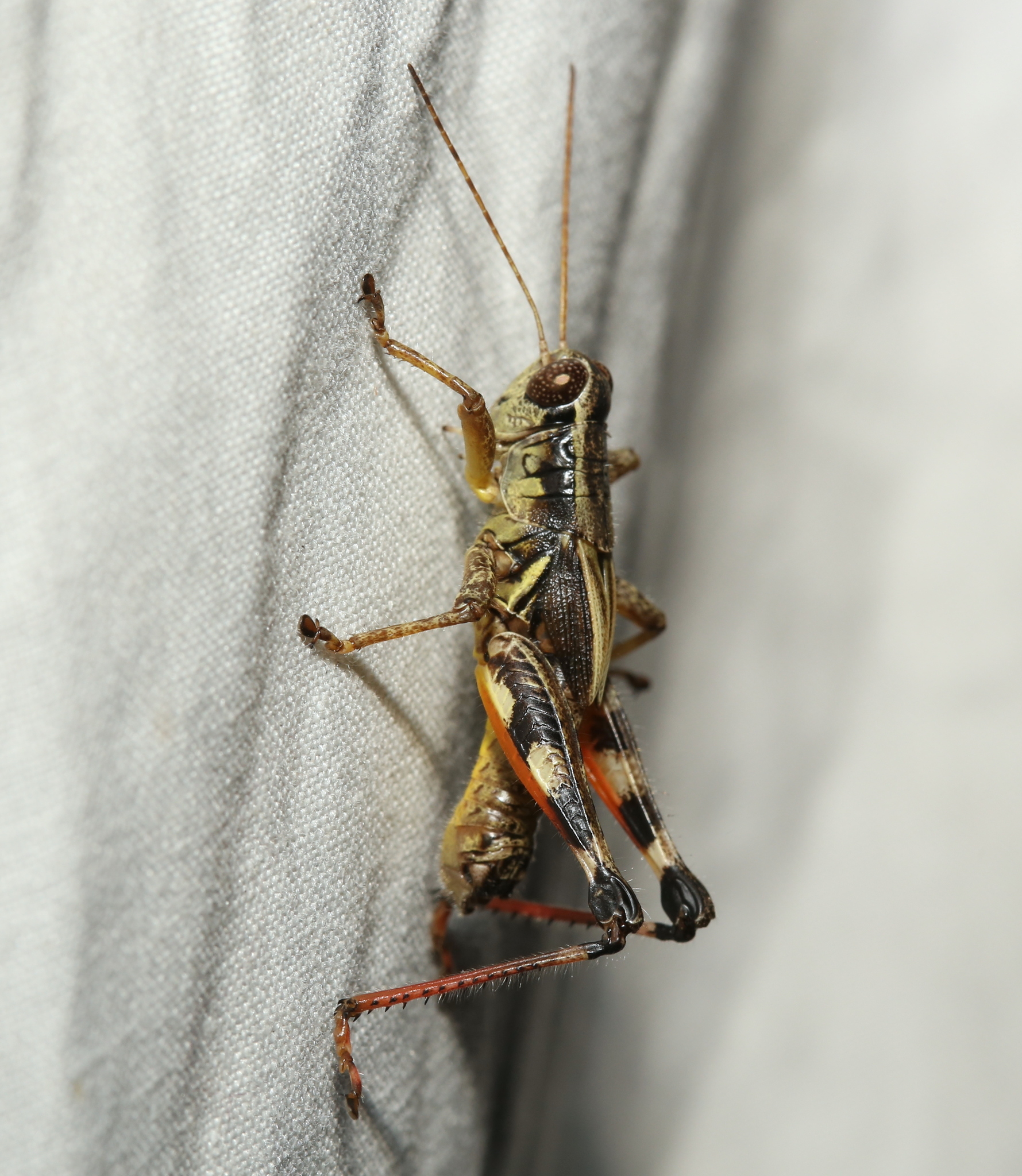

Scientific classification
- Kingdom: Animalia
- Phylum: Arthropoda
- Clade: Pancrustacea
- Class: Insecta
- Order: Orthoptera
- Suborder: Caelifera
- Family: Acrididae
- Genus: Melanoplus
- Species: M. walshii

Binomial name
- Melanoplus walshii Scudder, 1897

= Melanoplus walshii =

Species of grasshopper

Melanoplus walshii, known generally as the Walsh's short-wing grasshopper or Walsh's locust, is a species of spur-throated grasshopper in the family Acrididae. It is found in North America.
