= Melanoplus forcipatus =

Scientific classification
- Kingdom: Animalia
- Phylum: Arthropoda
- Clade: Pancrustacea
- Class: Insecta
- Order: Orthoptera
- Suborder: Caelifera
- Family: Acrididae
- Genus: Melanoplus
- Species: M. forcipatus

Binomial name
- Melanoplus forcipatus Hubbell, 1932

Species of grasshopper

Melanoplus forcipatus is a species of grasshopper in the subfamily Melanoplinae ("spur-throated grasshoppers"), in the family Acrididae ("short-horned grasshoppers"). The species is known generally as the "toothcercus shortwing grasshopper" or "broad cercus scrub grasshopper". It is endemic to scrub and sandhill communities in Highlands and Orange counties in Florida.
