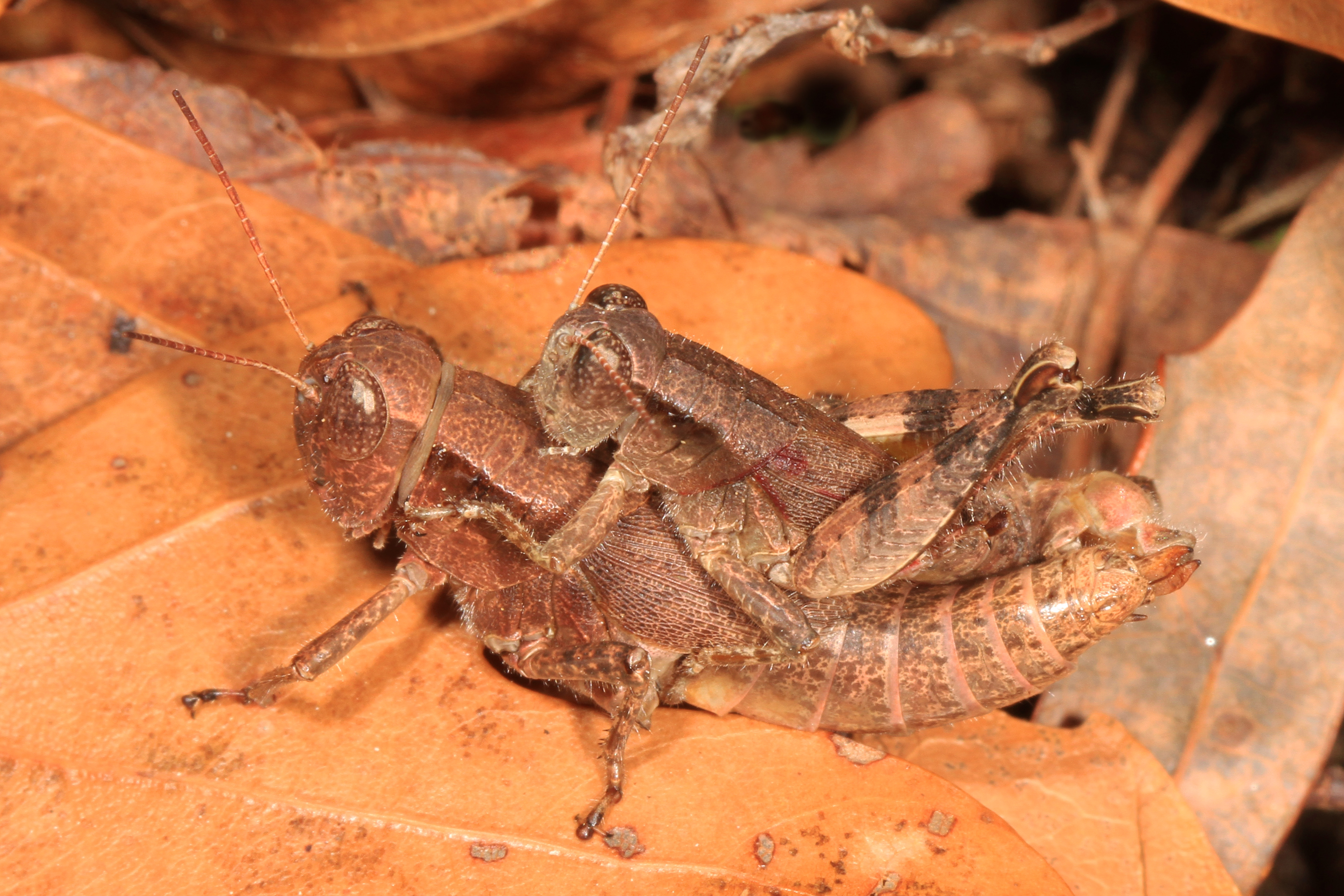

Scientific classification
- Kingdom: Animalia
- Phylum: Arthropoda
- Clade: Pancrustacea
- Class: Insecta
- Order: Orthoptera
- Suborder: Caelifera
- Family: Acrididae
- Tribe: Melanoplini
- Genus: Melanoplus
- Species: M. scudderi

Binomial name
- Melanoplus scudderi (Uhler, 1864)

= Melanoplus scudderi =

Species of grasshopper

Melanoplus scudderi, or Scudder's short-wing grasshopper, is a species of spur-throated grasshopper in the family Acrididae. It is found in North America.

== Subspecies ==
These three subspecies belong to the species Melanoplus scudderi:

- Melanoplus scudderi latus Morse, 1906^{i}
- Melanoplus scudderi scudderi (Uhler, 1864)^{i}
- Melanoplus scudderi texensis Hart, 1906^{i}

Data sources: i = ITIS, c = Catalogue of Life, g = GBIF, b = Bugguide.net
