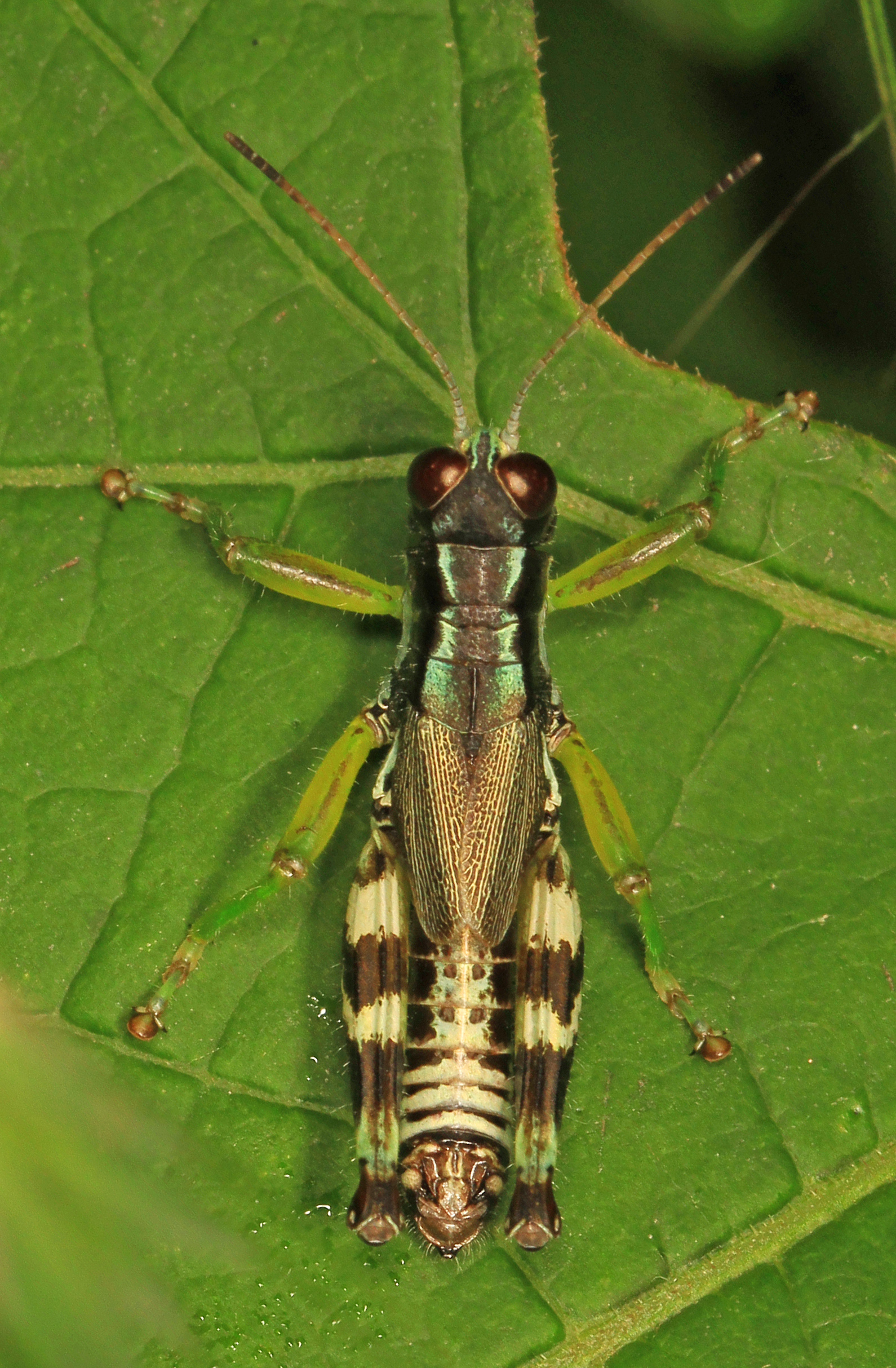

Scientific classification
- Kingdom: Animalia
- Phylum: Arthropoda
- Clade: Pancrustacea
- Class: Insecta
- Order: Orthoptera
- Suborder: Caelifera
- Family: Acrididae
- Subfamily: Melanoplinae
- Tribe: Melanoplini
- Genus: Melanoplus
- Species: M. viridipes

Binomial name
- Melanoplus viridipes Scudder, 1897

= Melanoplus viridipes =

Species of grasshopper

Melanoplus viridipes, the Green-legged Locust, is a species of spur-throated grasshopper in the family Acrididae. It is found in North America.
