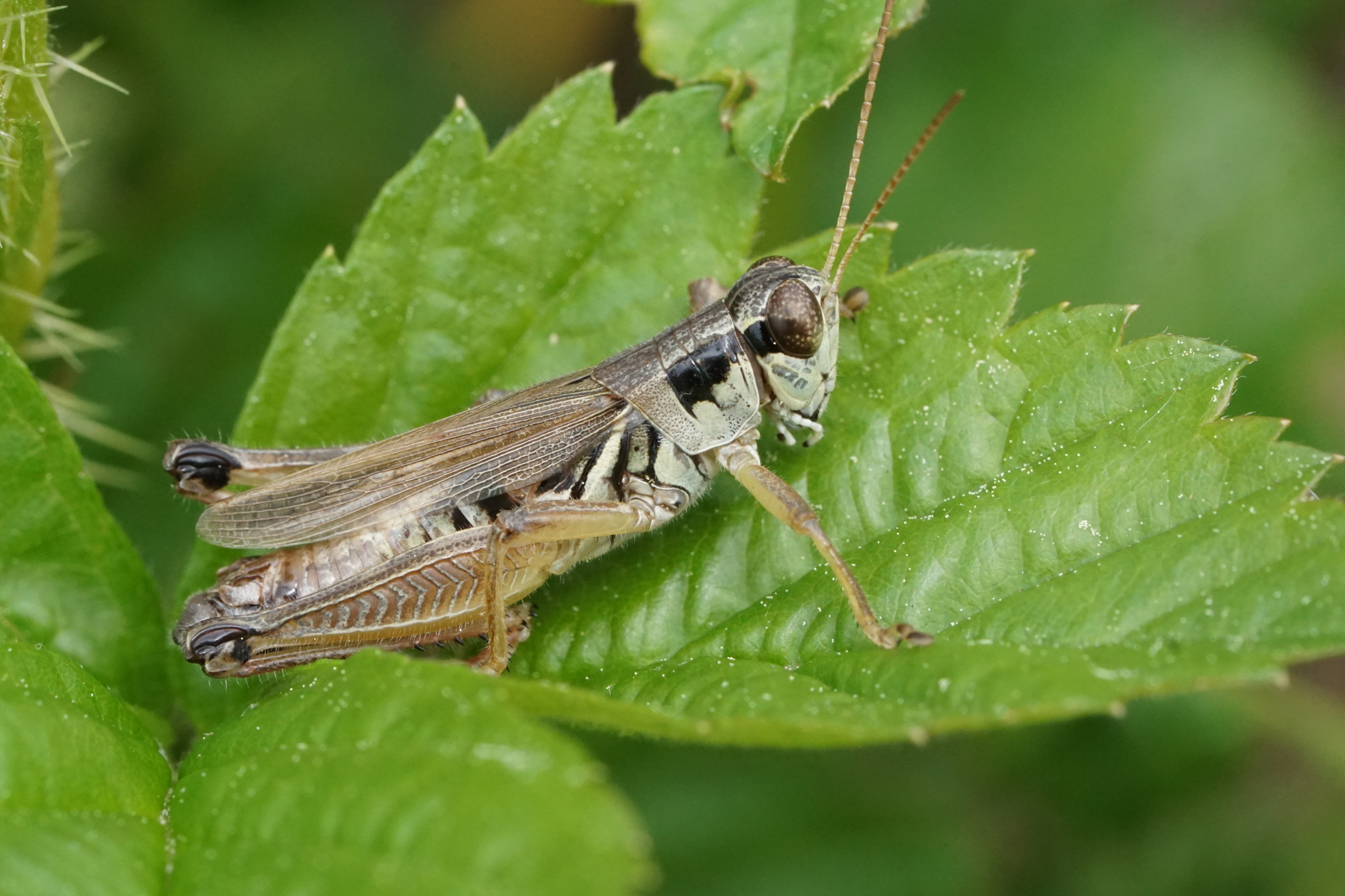
- Melanoplus borealis, Massachusetts

Scientific classification
- Kingdom: Animalia
- Phylum: Arthropoda
- Clade: Pancrustacea
- Class: Insecta
- Order: Orthoptera
- Suborder: Caelifera
- Family: Acrididae
- Tribe: Melanoplini
- Genus: Melanoplus
- Species: M. borealis

Binomial name
- Melanoplus borealis (Fieber, 1853)

= Melanoplus borealis =

Species of grasshopper

Melanoplus borealis, known generally as the northern spur-throat grasshopper or northern grasshopper, is a species of spur-throated grasshopper in the family Acrididae. It is found in North America.

Melanoplus borealis are typically found in North America. They prefer habitats in lowlands and mountain sites, such as swamps, moist mountain meadows, and wet bogs.

Melanoplus borealis generally like to feed on forbs, and sometimes will explore certain grasses or adult crops.

== Subspecies ==
These four subspecies belong to the species Melanoplus borealis:

- Melanoplus borealis borealis (Fieber, 1853)
- Melanoplus borealis palaceus Fulton, 1930
- Melanoplus borealis stupefactus (Scudder, 1876)
- Melanoplus borealis utahensis Scudder, 1897
