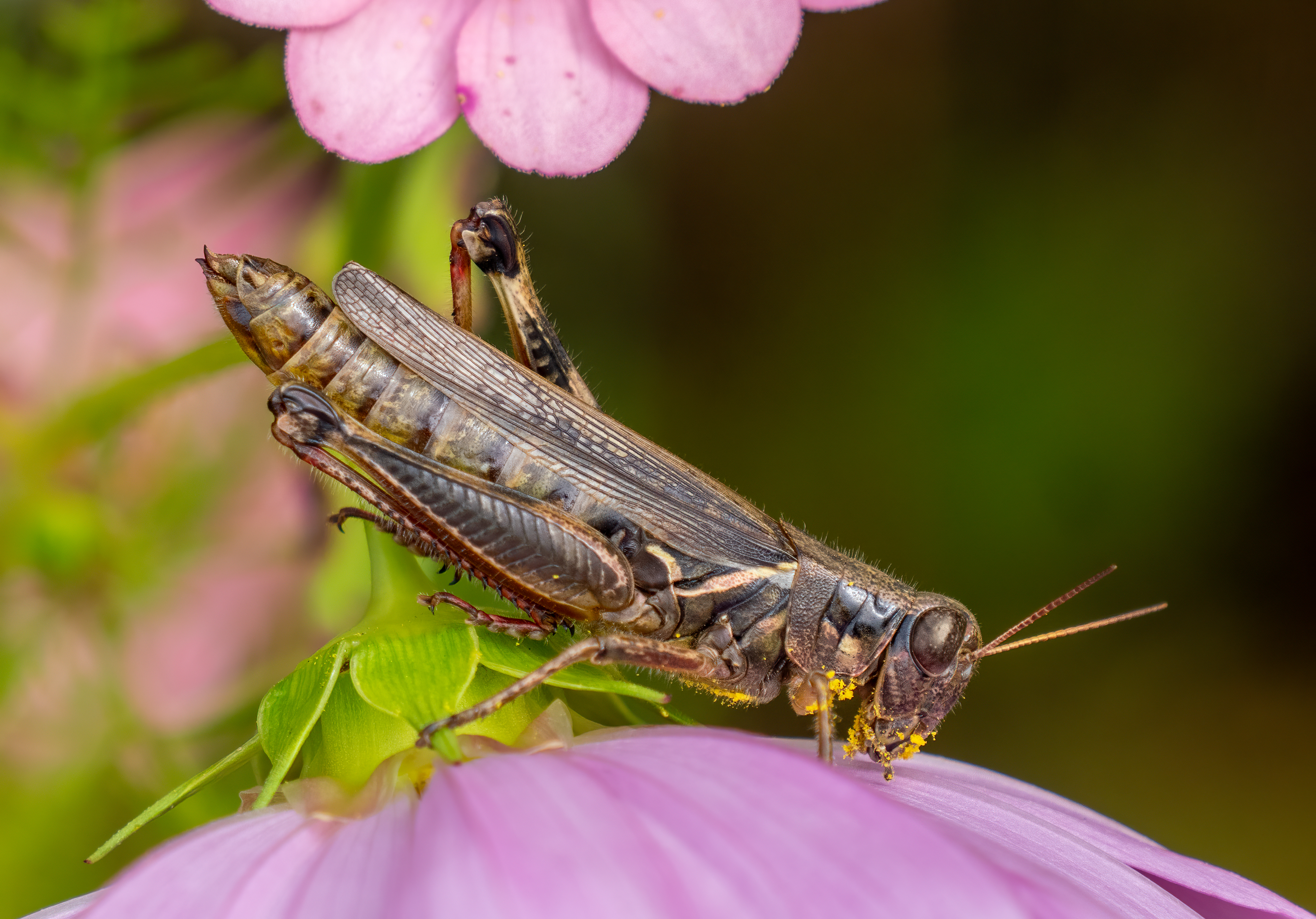
- Red-legged grasshopper (Melanoplus femurrubrum)

Scientific classification
- Kingdom: Animalia
- Phylum: Arthropoda
- Clade: Pancrustacea
- Class: Insecta
- Order: Orthoptera
- Suborder: Caelifera
- Family: Acrididae
- Subfamily: Melanoplinae
- Tribe: Melanoplini
- Genus: Melanoplus; Stål, 1873

Species
- See list of Melanoplus species

= Melanoplus =

Genus of grasshoppers

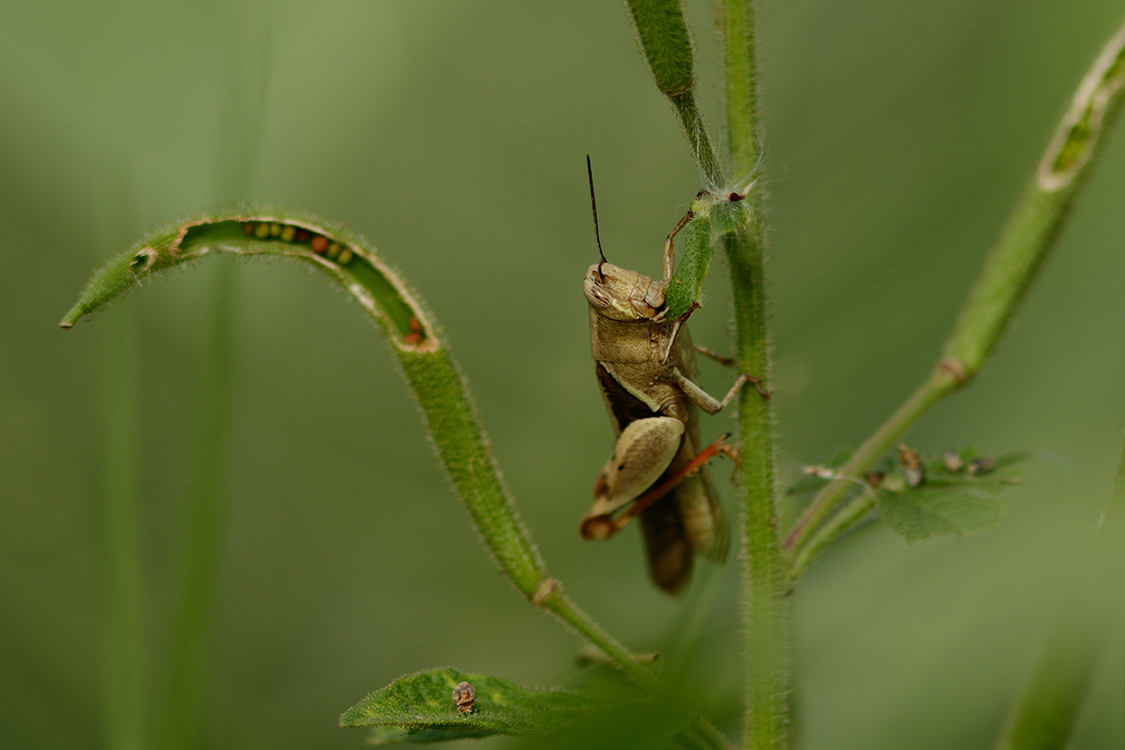
MG 5668 Cricket SRGB INW

Differential grasshopper grazing on yellow ironweed. A brief interaction with a paper wasp occurs.

Melanoplus is a large genus of grasshoppers. They are the typical large grasshoppers (and in some cases migratory "locusts") in North America. A common name is spur-throat grasshoppers (also "spurthroat" or "spur-throated grasshoppers"), but this more typically refers to members of the related subfamily Catantopinae.

The largest grasshoppers of this genus can reach nearly 5 cm (2.0 in) in length, but most are smaller. Some are intricately patterned and colorful, others are drab.

Melanoplus species eat grasses of all kinds, as well as leafy and grassy agricultural crops and garden plants. They feed on the leaves, and sometimes fruit, flowers, and buds, as well as tree bark. Many of the more notable agricultural pest grasshoppers belong here, including the Rocky Mountain locust, the most significant insect pest of the 19th century Great Plains, but now extinct.

== Selected species ==
New species are often being discovered and described in this genus where speciation runs rampant in isolated areas, involving speciation by hybridization.

- Melanoplus adelogyrus – Volusia grasshopper, St. Johns short-wing grasshopper
- Melanoplus alpinus – alpine grasshopper
- Melanoplus angustipennis – narrow-winged sand grasshopper, narrow-winged spur-throat grasshopper
- Melanoplus aridus – arid lands spur-throat grasshopper
- Melanoplus bispinosus – two-spined spurthroated grasshopper
- Melanoplus bivittatus – two-striped grasshopper
- Melanoplus borealis – northern spur-throat grasshopper
- Melanoplus bowditchi – sagebrush grasshopper
- Melanoplus bruneri – Bruner's spur-throat grasshopper
- Melanoplus confusus – pasture grasshopper
- Melanoplus dawsonii – Dawson's grasshopper
- Melanoplus devastator – devastating grasshopper
- Melanoplus differentialis – differential grasshopper
- Melanoplus femurrubrum – red-legged grasshopper
- Melanoplus foedus – striped sand grasshopper
- Melanoplus foxi Hebard, 1923
- Melanoplus forcipatus
- Melanoplus gladstoni – Gladston's (spur-throat) grasshopper
- Melanoplus infantilis – little spur-throat grasshopper
- Melanoplus keeleri – Keeler's spur-throat grasshopper
- Melanoplus kennicotti – Kennicott grasshopper
- Melanoplus lakinus – Lakin grasshopper
- Melanoplus ludivinae Fontana, Buzzetti & Marino-Perez, 2011
- Melanoplus mixes Fontana, Buzzetti & Marino-Perez, 2011
- Melanoplus nossi– Noss' spur throat grasshopper
- Melanoplus oaxacae Fontana, Buzzetti & Marino-Perez, 2011
- Melanoplus occidentalis – flabellate grasshopper
- Melanoplus packardii – Packard's grasshopper
- Melanoplus punctulatus – pine tree spur-throat grasshopper
- Melanoplus quercicola
- Melanoplus rugglesi – Nevada sage grasshopper
- Melanoplus sanguinipes – migratory grasshopper
- Melanoplus scudderi – Scudder's short-winged grasshopper
- †Melanoplus spretus – Rocky Mountain locust (extinct: 1902)
- Melanoplus stonei – Stone's grasshopper
- Melanoplus viridipes – green-legged grasshopper
- Melanoplus walshii – Walsh's short-wing grasshopper
- Melanoplus washingtonius
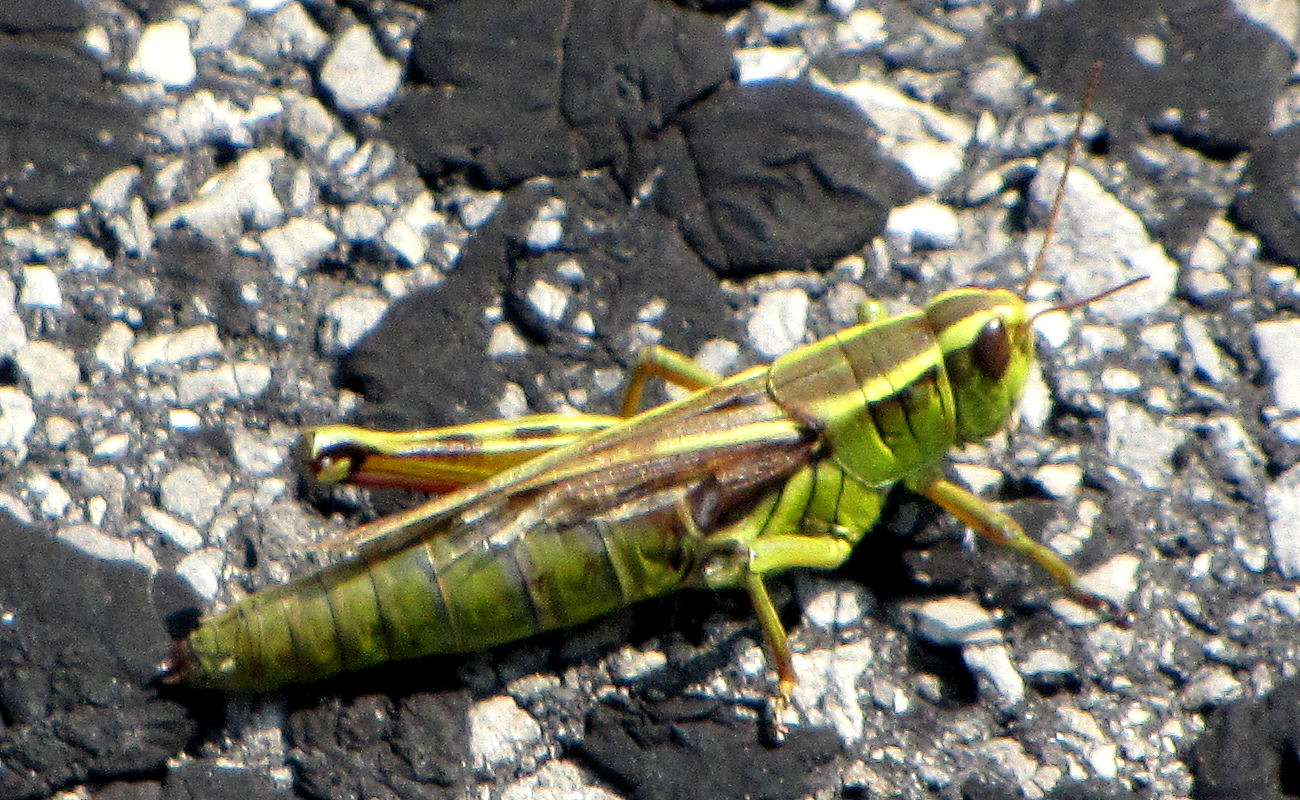
Two-striped grasshopper (Melanoplus bivittatus)

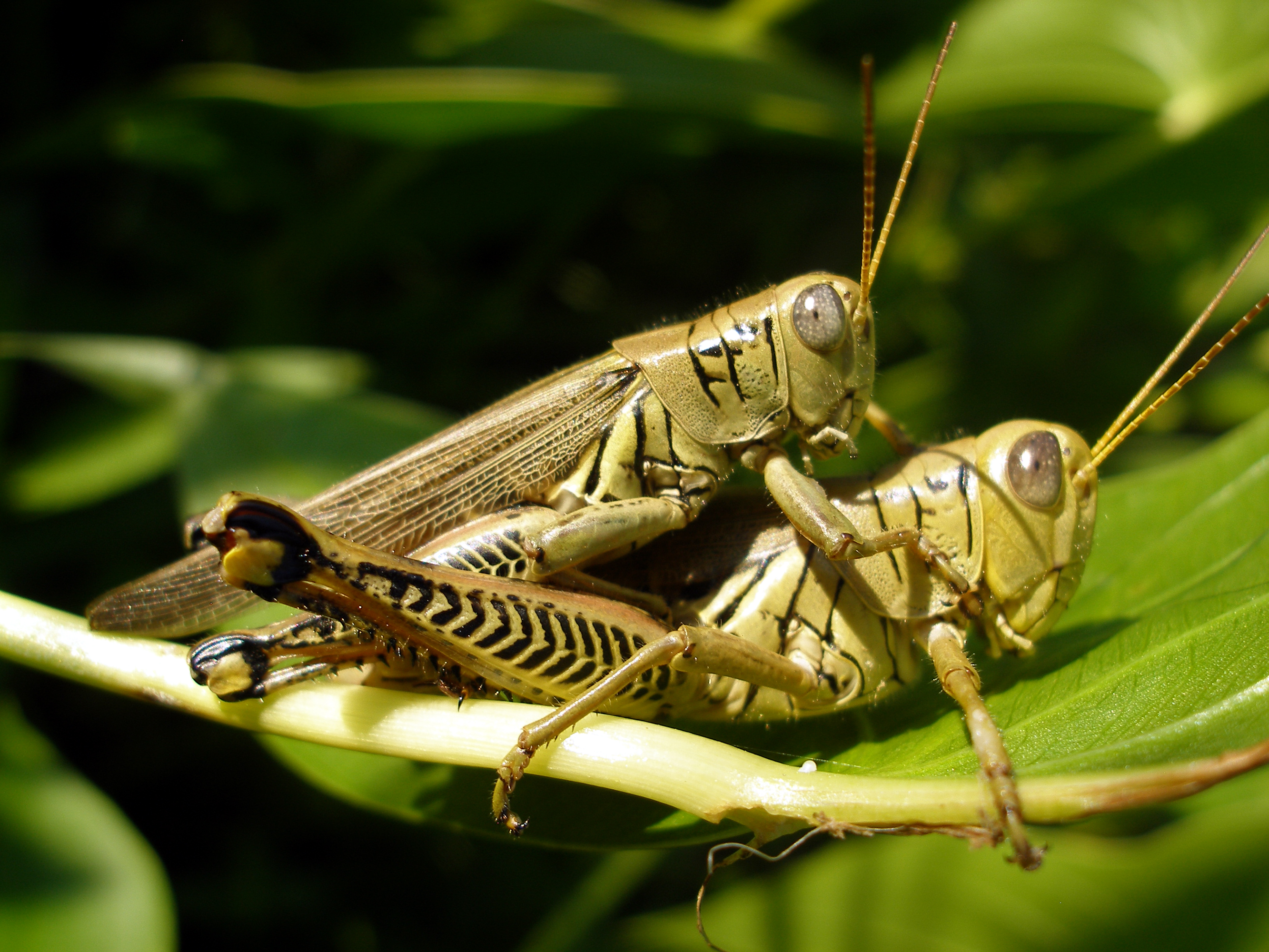
Differential grasshopper (Melanoplus differentialis)

== See also ==
- List of Melanoplus species
