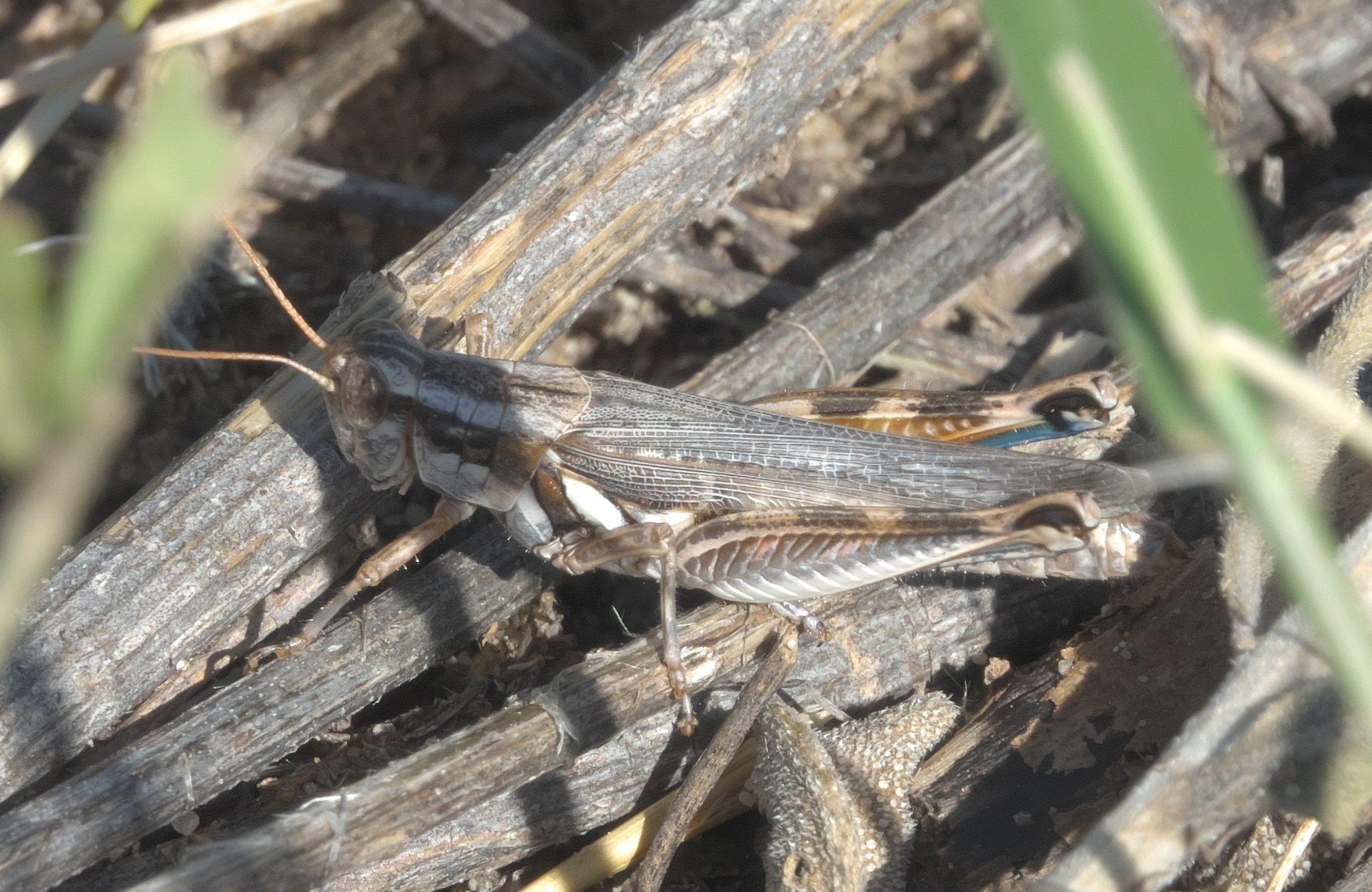
- Melanoplus bowditchi, sagebrush grasshopper, Colorado

Scientific classification
- Kingdom: Animalia
- Phylum: Arthropoda
- Clade: Pancrustacea
- Class: Insecta
- Order: Orthoptera
- Suborder: Caelifera
- Family: Acrididae
- Subfamily: Melanoplinae
- Tribe: Melanoplini
- Genus: Melanoplus
- Species: M. bowditchi

Binomial name
- Melanoplus bowditchi Scudder, 1878

= Melanoplus bowditchi =

Species of grasshopper

Melanoplus bowditchi, the sagebrush grasshopper, is a species of short-horned grasshopper in the subfamily Melanoplinae. It is found in North America.

== Subspecies ==
These two subspecies belong to the species Melanoplus bowditchi:

- Melanoplus bowditchi bowditchi Scudder, 1878 (Sagebrush Grasshopper) (North America)
- Melanoplus bowditchi canus Hebard, 1925 (North America)
