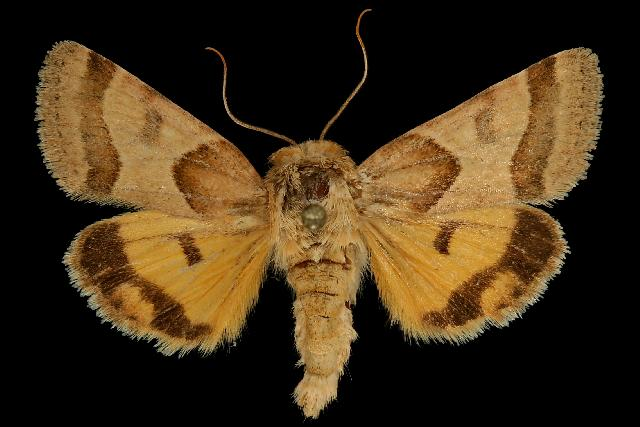

Scientific classification
- Kingdom: Animalia
- Phylum: Arthropoda
- Class: Insecta
- Order: Lepidoptera
- Superfamily: Noctuoidea
- Family: Noctuidae
- Genus: Schinia
- Species: S. jaguarina

Binomial name
- Schinia jaguarina Guenée, 1852

Synonyms
- Schinia demaculata

= Schinia jaguarina =

Species of moth

Schinia jaguarina, the jaguar flower moth, is a moth of the family Noctuidae. The species was first described by Achille Guenée in 1852. It is found on North America's Great Plains from Saskatchewan and Alberta south to Texas, eastward on coast to Florida and westward in south to Arizona. In Mexico it is found down to Mexico City.

The wingspan is about 30 mm. Adults are on wing from June to July.

The larvae feed on Baptisia, Pediomelum rhombifolium, Psoralidium tenuiflorum and Trifolium.
