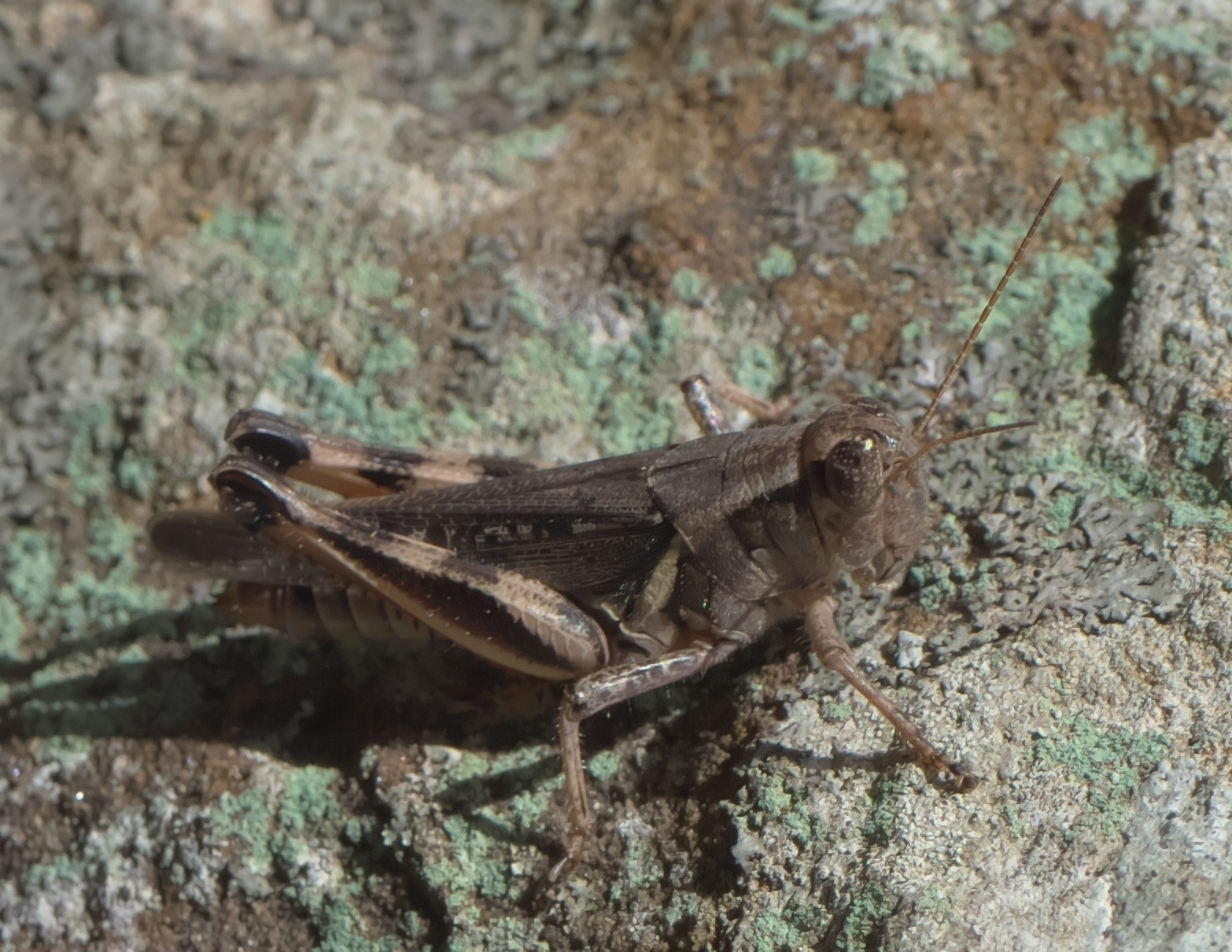

Scientific classification
- Kingdom: Animalia
- Phylum: Arthropoda
- Clade: Pancrustacea
- Class: Insecta
- Order: Orthoptera
- Suborder: Caelifera
- Family: Acrididae
- Tribe: Melanoplini
- Genus: Melanoplus
- Species: M. keeleri

Binomial name
- Melanoplus keeleri Thomas, 1874

= Melanoplus keeleri =

Species of grasshopper

Melanoplus keeleri, commonly known as Keeler's spur-throat grasshopper or Keeler grasshopper, is a species of spur-throated grasshopper in the family Acrididae. It is found in North America.

== Subspecies ==
These two subspecies belong to the species Melanoplus keeleri:

- Melanoplus keeleri keeleri Thomas, 1874^{i c g}
- Melanoplus keeleri luridus (Dodge, 1876)^{i c g}

Data sources: i = ITIS, c = Catalogue of Life, g = GBIF, b = Bugguide.net
