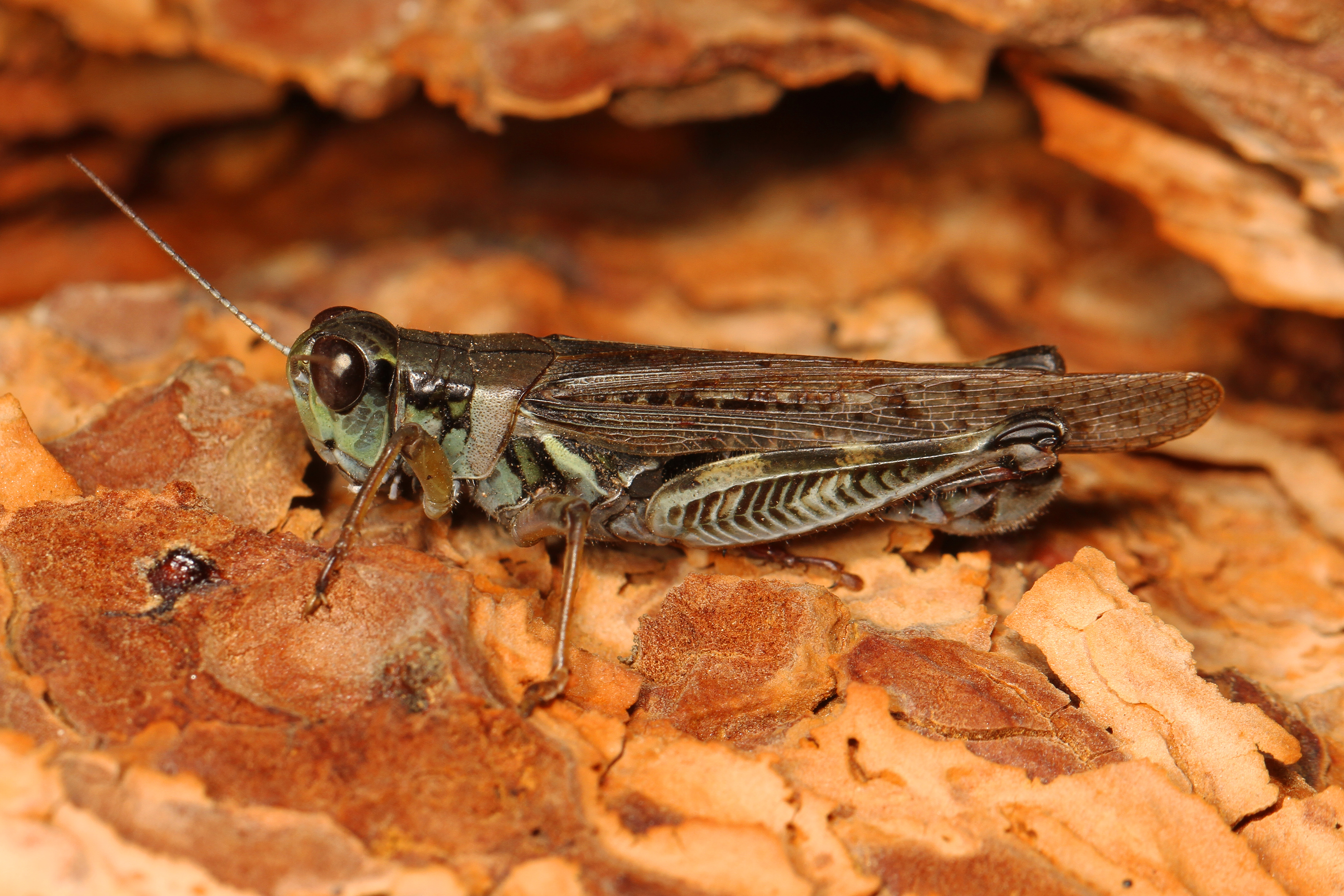
- Male
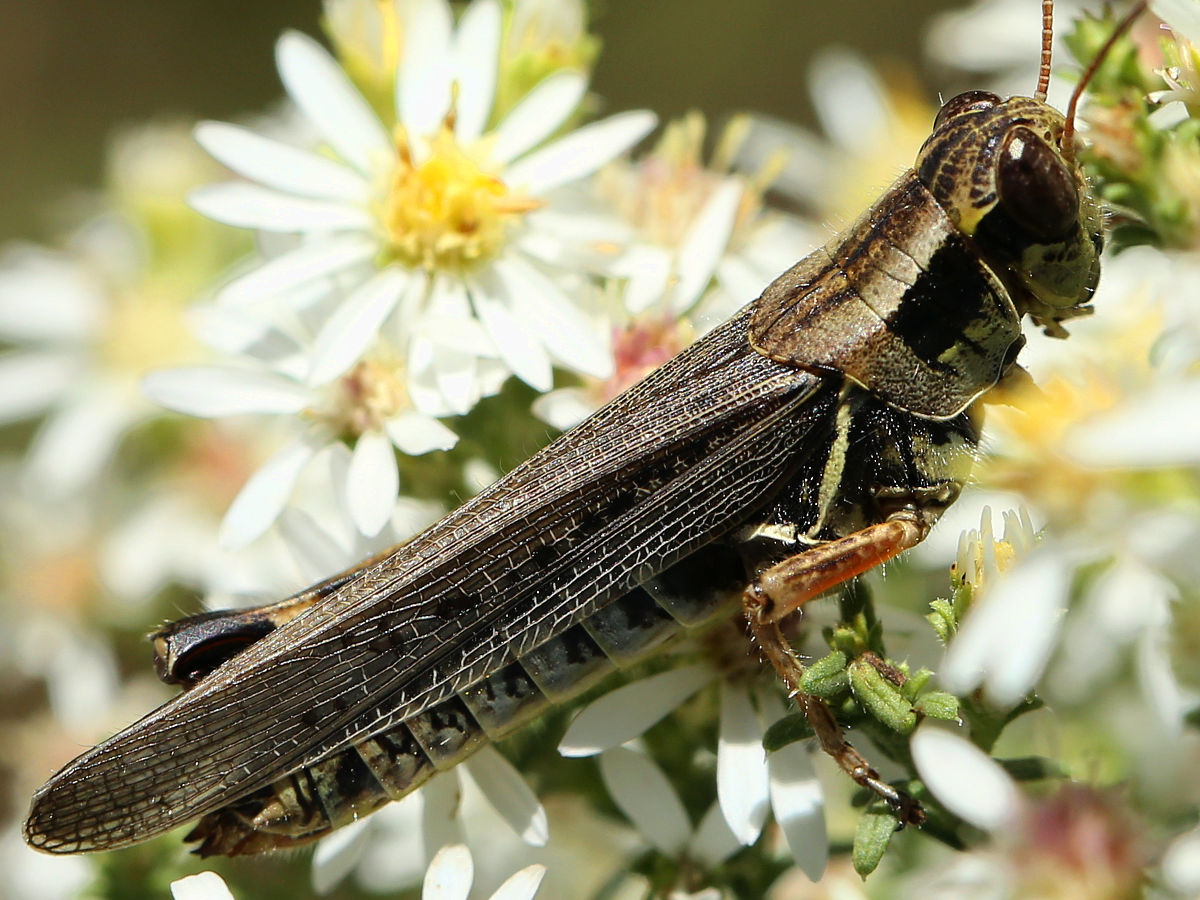
- Female

Scientific classification
- Kingdom: Animalia
- Phylum: Arthropoda
- Clade: Pancrustacea
- Class: Insecta
- Order: Orthoptera
- Suborder: Caelifera
- Family: Acrididae
- Genus: Melanoplus
- Species: M. sanguinipes

Binomial name
- Melanoplus sanguinipes (Fabricius, 1798)

Synonyms
- Melanoplus mexicanus Saussure, 1861; Melanoplus bilituratus Walker, 1870

= Melanoplus sanguinipes =

Species of grasshopper

Melanoplus sanguinipes, known generally as migratory grasshopper, is a species of spur-throated grasshopper in the family Acrididae. Other common names include the lesser migratory grasshopper and red-legged grasshopper (which is also the common name of a separate species). It is found in the Caribbean and North America.

== Subspecies ==
These four subspecies belong to the species Melanoplus sanguinipes:

- Melanoplus sanguinipes atlanis (Riley, 1875)^{i c g}
- Melanoplus sanguinipes defectus Scudder, 1897^{i c g}
- Melanoplus sanguinipes sanguinipes (Fabricius, 1798)^{i c g}
- Melanoplus sanguinipes vulturnus Gurney and Brooks, 1959^{i g}

Data sources: i = ITIS, c = Catalogue of Life, g = GBIF, b = Bugguide.net

== Description ==
A common and widespread medium grasshopper, varying from 15mm-30mm in length. Females tend to be larger than males. The species is identified by broad, apically-rounded cerci and the color of the hind tibiae: usually a red, orange or pink but occasionally blue, green, or a dull brown.
