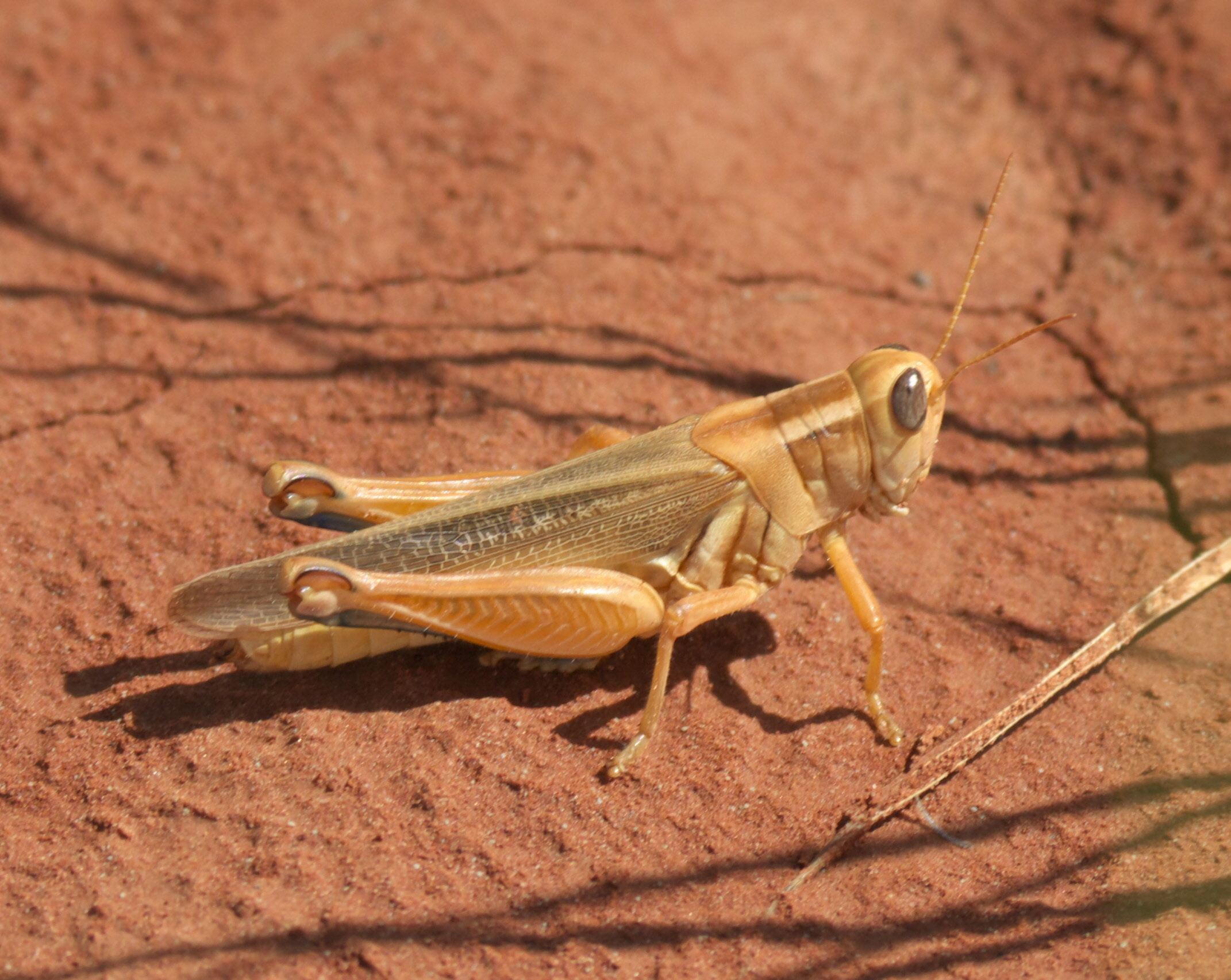

Scientific classification
- Kingdom: Animalia
- Phylum: Arthropoda
- Clade: Pancrustacea
- Class: Insecta
- Order: Orthoptera
- Suborder: Caelifera
- Family: Acrididae
- Genus: Melanoplus
- Species: M. packardii

Binomial name
- Melanoplus packardii Scudder, 1878

= Melanoplus packardii =

Species of grasshopper

Melanoplus packardii, known generally as the "Packard's grasshopper", is a species of spur-throated grasshoppers in the family Acrididae. It is found in North America.

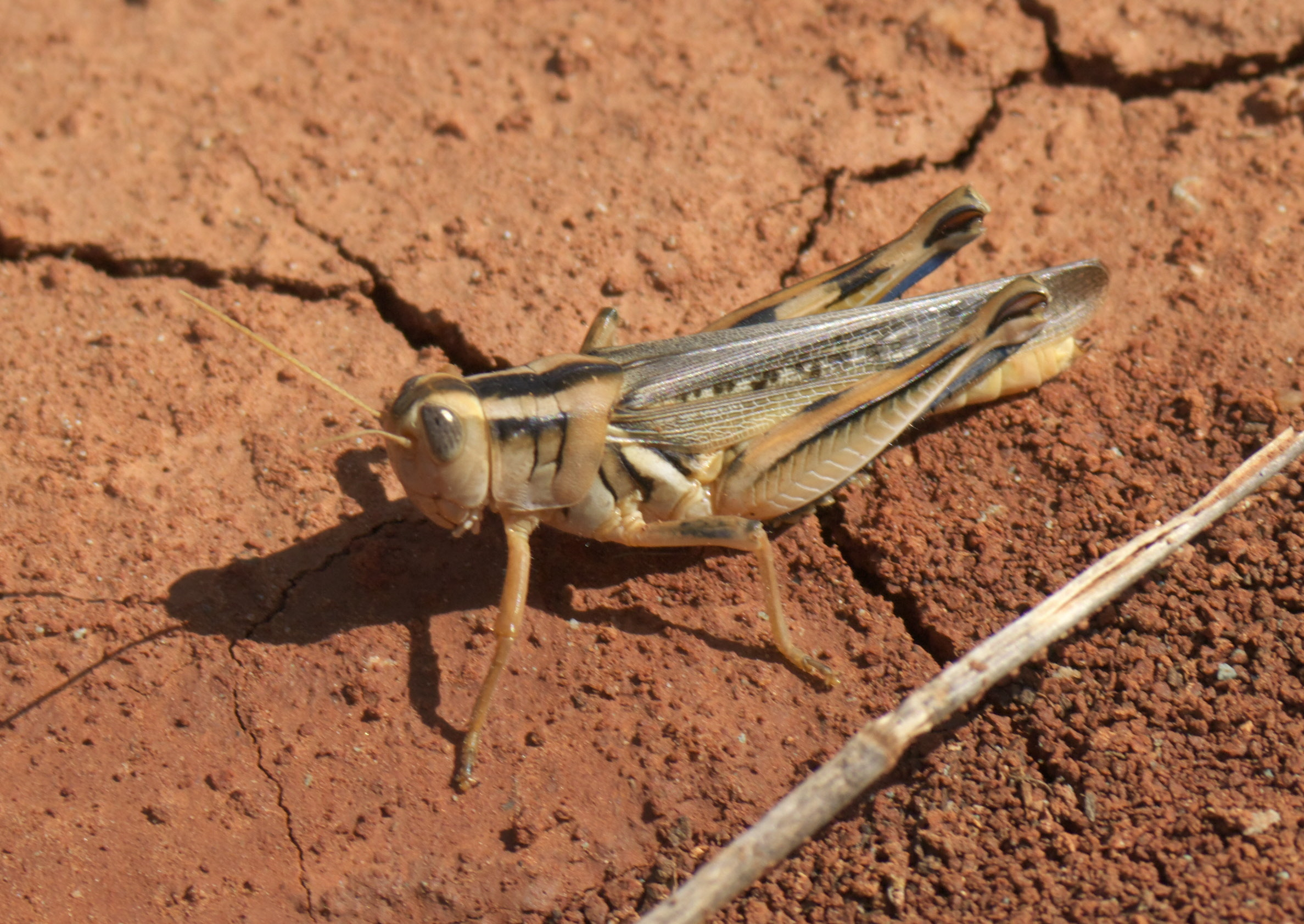
Packard's Grasshopper, Melanoplus packardii, Major, OK, USA
