= List of orthopteroids of Korea =

This is a list of Polyneoptera, or "orthopteroid" insects found in the wild of the Korean Peninsula and surrounding islands.

== Grasshoppers ==
Common name (Korean name)	Species (Authority)	Preferred habitat	Range	Status
Pyrgomorphidae - 2 species
(섬서구메뚜기/장단메뚜기/방아가비)	Atractomorpha lata (Motschulsky, 1866)		Throughout the Korean peninsula.	I:
(분홍날개섬서구메뚜기)	Atractomorpha sinensis sinensis (Mistshenko, 1951)		South Korea. Also found in China.	I:
Acrididae -
(검은줄벼메뚜기)	Oxya agavisa (Tsai, 1931)			I:
(벼메뚜기/우리벼메뚜기)	Oxya chinensis sinuosa (Mistshenko, 1951)			I:
(애기벼메뚜기)	Oxya hyla instricata (Stal, 1861)			I:
(밑들이메뚜기/밑드리메뚜기/좀밑드리메뚜기/거품메뚜기)	Anapodisma miramae (Dovnar-Zapolsky 1933)	Mountains		I:
(팔공산밑들이메뚜기)	Anapodisma beybienkoi (Rentz and Miller, 1971)		Throughout mainland, Jejudo, Ulleung-do	I:
(원산밑들이메뚜기/남방메뚜기)	Ognevia sergii (Ikonnikov, 1911)		Mainland, Ulleung-do	I:
(긴날개밑들이메뚜기/긴날개거품메뚜기)	Ognevia longipennis (Shiraki 1910)		Mainland South Korea	I:
(참밑들이메뚜기)	Podisma aberrans (Ikonnikov 1911)			I:
(검정무릎삽사리)	Podismopsis genicularibus (Shiraki, 1910)	Lives in grass fields in mountain areas.	North and central parts of the Korean peninsula	I:
(고산삽사리)	Podisma ussuriensis ussuriensis (Ikonnikov, 1911)	Lives in grass fields in mountains at least 1700 meters in altitude.	Jejudo. Also in Mongolia, Primorye.	I:
(제주밑들이메뚜기/반디밑들이메뚜기)	Parapodisma setouchiensis (Inoue 1979)		Jeju-do	I:
(고산밑들이메뚜기)	Miramella solitaria (Ikonnikov 1911)			I:
(한라북방밑들이메뚜기/우리북방밑들이메뚜기)	Prumna halrasana (Lee and Lee 1984)			I:
(고산북방밑들이메뚜기)	Prumna plana (Mistshenko 1974)			I:
(참북방밑들이메뚜기)	Prumna mandshurica (Ramme 1939)			I:
(우수리북방밑들이메뚜기/우수리밑드리메뚜기)	Prumna primnoides (Ikonnikov 1911)			I:
(참민날개밑들이메뚜기/참밑드리메뚜기)	Zubovskya morii (Bey-Bienko 1931)			I:
(민날개밑들이메뚜기/백두산민날개밑드리메뚜기/반날개메뚜기)	Zubovskya koeppeni parvula (Ikonnikov 1911)		North Korea	I:
(한국민날개밑들이메뚜기)	Zubovskya koreana (Mistshenko 1952)			I:
(꽃메뚜기)	Chondracris rosea (de Geer 1773)		only listed species. Also found in China.	I:
(각시메뚜기/땅메뚜기/등줄메뚜기/등줄땅메뚜기/알록메뚜기/일본메뚜기/흙메뚜기)	Nomadacris japonica (Bolivar 1898)		Southern part of Korean peninsula in the seacoast and Jeju-do, Geojedo, Namhae County, Wando County.	I:
(땅딸보메뚜기/도이땅딸보메뚜기/한국땅딸보메뚜기	Calliptamus abbreviatus (Ikonnikov 1913)			I:
(등검은메뚜기/검은등메뚜기/시라끼메뚜기)	Shirakiacris shirakii (Bolivar 1914)		Throughout Korean peninsula, Jeju-do, Ulleung-do. Also in other eastern Asia.	I:
(방아깨비/방아개비/방아다리메뚜기	Acrida cinerea (Thunberg 1815)	Fields.	Throughout the Korean peninsula, Jeju-do, Ulleung-do. Also in China, Japan and Taiwan.	I:
(검정수염메뚜기/대메뚜기)	Ceracris nigricornis laeta (Bolivar 1914)	Common in grass fields in hills.	Southern part of Korean peninsula	I:
(딱다기/딱따기/딱때기/딱대기붙이/대만딱다깨비사촌)	Gonista bicolor (de Haan 1842)			I:
Leek grasshopper (벼메뚜기붙이/벼메뚜기부치/벼메뚜기번티기)	Mecostethus alliaceus (Germar 1871)			I:
(끝검은메뚜기)	Stethophyma magister (Rehn 1902)			I:
(참어리삽사리/울음메뚜기번티기)	Arcyptera coreana (Shiraki 1930)			I:
(어리삽사리)	Arcyptera fusca albogeniculata (Ikonnikov 1911)		North Korea	I:
(잔날개어리삽사리/작은날개울음메뚜기번티기)	Paracyptera microptera meridionalis (Ikonnikov 1911)		North Korea	I:
(북채수염수중다리메뚜기/북채수염메뚜기)	Gomphocerus kudia (Caudell 1927)		North Korea	I:
(북채수염메뚜기/붉은메뚜기붉은메뚜기/빨간메뚜기)	Gomphocerippus rufus (Linnaeus 1758)		North Korea	I:
	Glyptobothrus dubius (Zubowsky 1898)		North Korea	I:
(극동애메뚜기/애메뚜기/애기메뚜기/변색애기메뚜기)	Glyptobothrus maritimus (Mishchenko 1951)		mountain region of the Korean peninsula.	I:
(동방애메뚜기/동방애기메뚜기)	Chorthippus intermedius (Bey-Bienko 1926)		North Korea	I:
(시베리아애메뚜기/씨비리애기메뚜기)	Chorthippus hammarstroemi (Miram 1907)			I:
Water-meadow grasshopper (긴수염애메뚜기/산애기메뚜기)	Chorthippus montanus (Charpentier 1825)			I:
(수염치레애메뚜기/긴수염애기메뚜기/쇠긴수염애기메뚜기/발해애메뚜기/긴날개애기메뚜기)	Schmidtiacris schmidti (Ikonnikov 1913)			I:
(꼭지메뚜기)	Euchorthippus unicolor (Ikonnikov 1913)			I:
(청날개애메뚜기/실뿔메뚜기/검푸른애기메뚜기)	MMegaulacobothrus aethalinus (Zubowsky 1899)			I:
(제주청날개애메뚜기/폭날개애메뚜기	MMegaulacobothrus jejuensis Kim, 2008		Jejudo(indigenous species)	I:
Orange-tipped grasshopper (대륙메뚜기/붉은배풀메뚜기)	Omocestus haemorrhoidalis (Charpentier 1825)			I:
Common green grasshopper (구대륙메뚜기/푸른풀메뚜기)	Omocestus viridulus (Linnaeus 1758)		North Korea	I:
Large gold grasshopper (금빛삽사리)	Chrysochraon dispar major (Uvarov 1925)		This species was discovered in North Korea	I:
(삽사리/섬나라메뚜기)	Mongolotettix japonicus (Bolivar 1898)		Throughout the Korean peninsula.	I:
(알타이삽사리)	Podismopsis altaica (Zubowsky 1899)		North Korea	I:
(백두산삽사리/산삽사리/우수리산삽사리)	Podismopsis ussuriensis (Ikonnikov 1911)		This species was first discovered in North Korea	I:
(검정무릎삽사리/검정삽사리/검정물팍삽사리/반날개삽사리)	Podismopsis genicularibus (Shiraki 1910)			I:
(청분홍메뚜기/알락메뚜기)	Aiolopus thalassinus tamulus (Fabricius 1798)			I:
(해변메뚜기)	Epacromius japonicus (Shiraki 1910)			I:
(발톱메뚜기/얼룩메뚜기)	Epacromius pulverulentus (Fischer von Waldheim 1846)			I:
(홍날개메뚜기/붉은날개메뚜기/청다리메뚜기)	Celes skalozubovi akitanus (Shiraki 1910)			I:
(콩중이)	Gastrimargus marmoratus (Thunberg 1815)			I:
(풀무치/메뚜기/이주메뚜기)	Locusta migratoria (Linnaeus 1758)			I:
(팥중이/팥뛰기/팟중이/애콩중이)	Oedaleus infernalis (Saussure 1884)			I:
(두꺼비메뚜기/사마귀메뚜기)	Trilophidia annulata (Thunberg 1815)			I:
(강변메뚜기/벌메뚜기)	Sphingonotus mongolicus (Saussure 1888)			I:
(빨간종아리메뚜기)	Bryodema gebleri (Fischer von Waldheim 1836)		misrecorded species	I:
Speckled grasshopper (참홍날개메뚜기/붉은큰날개메뚜기)	Bryodemella tuberculatum dilutum (Stroll 1813)			I:

== Phasmatodea ==
Common name (Korean name)	Species (Authority)	Preferred habitat	Range	Status
Lonchodidae - 1 species
(긴수염대벌레)	Phraortes illepidus (Brunner von Wattenwyl, 1907)			I:
Phasmatidae - 3 species
(대벌레)	Baculum irregulariterdentatum (Brunner von Wattenwyl, 1907)			|:
(대벌레)	Baculum elongatus (Thunberg)			|:
(우리대벌레)	Baculum koreanum (Kwon Ha and Lee, 1992)		indigenous species	|:
Necrosciidae - 2 species
(분홍날개대벌레)	Micadina phluctainoides (Rehn 1904)			|:
(날개대벌레)	Micadina yasumatsui (Shiraki 1935)			|:

== Notoptera ==
Common name (Korean name)	Species (Authority)	Preferred habitat	Range	Status
Grylloblattidae - 5 species or more
(비룡갈로와벌레/비룡귀뚜라미붙이)	Namkungia biryongensis (Namkung 1974)		indigenous species	|:
(고수갈로와벌레/고수귀뚜라미붙이)	Galloisiana kosuensis Namkung 1974		indigenous species	|:
(동대갈로와벌레/동대귀뚜라미붙이)	Galloisiana magna (Namkung 1986)		indigenous species	|:
(백두갈로와벌레/백두귀뚜라미붙이)	Galloisiana sinensis (Wang 1987)		indigenous species	|:
(묘향갈로와벌레/묘향귀뚜라미붙이)	Galloisiana sofiae (Szeptycki 1987)		indigenous species	|:

Most of grylloblattids are unrecorded or unidentified species.

== Ensifera ==
Common name (Korean name)	Species (Authority)	Preferred habitat	Range	Status
Tettigoniidae - species
(여치/북방여치)	Gampsocleis sedakovii obscura (Walker, 1869)	grasslands		I:
(긴날개여치/긴날개우쑤리여치)	Gampsocleis ussuriensis Adelung, 1910	grasslands		I:
(중베짱이/만주중베짱이/먹중베짱이)	Tettigonia ussuriana (Walker, 1869)	grasslands		I:
(긴날개중베짱이/중베짱이)	Tettigonia dolichoptera Mori, 1933	grasslands	endemic	I:
(극동긴긴날개중베짱이)	Tettigonia uvarovi Ebner, 1946	grasslands		I:
(섬중베짱이/동방중베짱이)	Tettigonia jungi Storozhenko, Kim and Jeon, 2015	grasslands	Jejudo, Yeoseodo, endemic. Introduced in Seoul.	I:
(잔날개여치/작은날개애기여치)	Chizuella bonneti (Bolívar, 1890)			I:
(갈색여치/갈색긴허리여치)	Paratlanticus ussuriensis (Uvarov, 1926)			I:
(팔공여치)	Paratlanticus palgongensis Rentz and Miller, 1971			I:
(우리여치)	Anatlanticus koreanus Bey-Bienko, 1951		endemic	I:
(애여치)	Eobiana engelhardti engelhardti (Uvarov, 1926)			I:
(쌍색여치)	Bicolorana bicolor (Philippi, 1830)		North Korea	I:
(좀날개여치/검정긴허리여치)	Atlanticus brunneri (Pylnov, 1914)			I:
(민충이)	Deracantha transversa Uvarov			I:
(쌕쌔기)	Conocephalus chinensis Redtenbacher, 1891	grasslands	I:	
(점박이쌕쌔기)	Conocephalus maculatus (Le Guillou, 1841)	grasslands		I:
(좀쌕쌔기)	Conocephalus japonicus (Redtenbacher, 1891)	grasslands		I:
(긴꼬리쌕새기)	Conocephalus exemptus (Walker, 1869)			
(매부리)	Ruspolia lineosa (Walker, 1869)	grasslands		I:
(애매부리)	Ruspolia jezoensis (Matsumura and Shiraki, 1908)			I:
(좀매부리)	Euconocephalus nasutus (Thunberg, 1815)			I:
(여치베짱이)	Parvarhynchus japonicus (Shiraki, 1930)			I:
Sickle-bearing bush cricket (실베짱이/이슬여치)	Phaneroptera falcata Poda, 1761			I:
(검은다리실베짱이)	Phaneroptera nigroantennata (Brunner von Wattenwyl, 1878)	grasslands		I:
(날베짱이)	Sinochlora longifissa (Matsumura & Shiraki, 1908)	trees		I:
Myrmecophilidae - 1 species
Gryllacrididae - 4 species
(민어리여치)	Nippancistroger koreanus Storozhenko & Paik, 2003		Central and southern part of the Korean peninsula and Jeju-do. endemic	I:
(어리여치/귀뚜라미여치)	Radigryllacris japonica (Matsumura and Shiraki 1908)		Southern part of the Korean peninsula and Jeju-do. Also in Japan.	I:
(범어리여치)	Metriogryllacris tigris Kim, 2014		Southern part of the Korean islands (endemic)	I:
Rhaphidophoridae - 6 species
(산꼽등이)	Anoplophilus koreanus (Storozhenko & Paik, 2010)	endemic		|:
(장수꼽등이)	Diestrammena unicolor (Brunner von Wattenwyl, 1888)	Mountains. Around the forest floor and rotting wood.	Mainland	|:
Greenhouse camel cricket (알락꼽등이/알락말귀뚜라미)	Diestrammena asynamora (Adelung 1902)	cracks in rocks or near the houses	Mainland	|:
(꼽등이/한국굴꼽등이)	Diestrammena coreana (Yamasaki 1969)	Caves. They hide in dark places outside or inside houses during the daytime and come out during night. They can live near houses.	Mainland and Jejudo	|:
(검정꼽등이/우수리말귀뚜라미)	Paratachycines ussuriensis (Storozhenko 1990)	Mountains and also in caves.	Mainland and Jejudo	|:
(굴꼽등이)	Paratachycines boldyrevi (Uvarov 1926)	Caves in mountains	Mainland	|:
Gryllidae - species
(희시무르귀뚜라미/부엌귀뚜라미)	Gryllodes supplicans (Walker 1859)		Mainland and near the houses	I:
(먹귀뚜라미)	Nigrogryllus sibiricus (Chopard 1925))	Mountain slopes in dead leaves.	Mainland	I:
(쌍별귀뚜라미)	Gryllus bimaculatus (de Geer 1773)	invaded species for pets' feed		I:
(알락귀뚜라미/돌거북귀뚜라미)	Loxoblemmus campestris (Matsuura 1988)	Common in and near grassy areas.	Mainland and Jejudo	I:
(큰알락귀뚜라미)	Loxoblemmus magnatus (Matsuura 1985)			I:
(모대가리귀뚜라미/뿔귀뚜라미)	Loxoblemmus doenitzi (Stein 1881)	Lives in grassy areas, farms and parks.	Mainland and Jejudo	I:
(야산알락귀뚜라미/남쪽알락귀뚜라미	Loxoblemmus equestris (Saussure 1877)		Mainland	I:
(꽃알락귀뚜라미)	Loxoblemmus spectabilis (Gorochov and Kostia 1993)		This species was first discovered in North Korea	I:
(곰귀뚜라미)	Mitius minor (Shiraki 1911)			I:
(루루곰귀뚜라미)	Comidogryllus nipponensis (Shiraki 1911)	Slopes in mountain areas in dead leaves and under rocks.		I:
(샴귀뚜라미)	Modicogryllus siamensis (Chopard 1961)	Shores, islands, in short grass and under rocks.	Southern part of mainland South Korea and Jejudo.	I:
(왕귀뚜라미)	Teleogryllus emma (Ohmachi and Matsuura 1951)	Common around fields, grass fields, parks and farmland.	Mainland and Jejudo.	I:
(탈귀뚜라미/귀뚜라미/애귀뚜라미)	Velarifictorus aspersus (Walker 1869)	Southern parts of the Korean peninsula	Mainland	I:
(극동귀뚜라미)	Velarifictorus micado (Saussure 1877)	Usually found in grass fields and near houses. Males dig a hole under a rock to call.	Mainland and Jejudo.	I:
(봄여름귀뚜라미)	Velarifictorus ornatus (Shiraki 1911)		Mainland	I:
(뚱보귀뚜라미)	Duolandrevus ivani (Gorochov 1988)	Under bark or cracks in rock cliffs.	Jejudo	I:
	Landreva clara? (Walker 1869)	?	probably misrecorded species	I:
(곰방울벌레)	Sclerogryllus punctatus (Brunner von Wattenwyl 1893)	They live on the ground of tall, thick grass with dead leaves.	Central, south and Jejudo	I:
(솔귀뚜라미/큰홀쭉귀뚜라미)	Xenogryllus marmoratus marmoratus (De Haan, 1842)		Mainland and Jejudo	I:
(청솔귀뚜라미/푸른씩씨리)	Truljalia hibinonis (Matsumura 1919)		Southern part of the Korean peninsula and Jeju-do. Also in Japan.: I:	

== Cockroaches and Termites ==
Common name (Korean name)	Species (Authority)	Preferred habitat	Range	Status
Cryptocercidae - 2 species
(가시바퀴)	Cryptocercus relictus Bey-Bienko 1935	Rotting wood		I:
(갑옷바퀴/귀신바퀴)	Cryptocercus kyebangensis (Grandcolas 2001)	Rotten trunks and branches in high mountains.	Mainland(indigenous species)	I:
Blattidae - 4 species
American Cockroach (이질바퀴/미국바퀴/고리무늬바퀴)	Periplaneta americana (Linnaeus, 1758)	Indoors. Common domestic pest.		|:
Smokybrown Cockroach (먹바퀴)	Periplaneta fuliginosa (Serville, 1838)	Outdoors, in rotting wood. Common pest in Jeju-do.		|:
Japanese Cockroach (집바퀴/일본바퀴)	Periplaneta japonica (Karny, 1908)	Rotting wood or indoors. Common domestic pest.	Mainland	|:
Australian Cockroach (잔이질바퀴/작은고리무늬바퀴)	Periplaneta australasiae (Fabricius, 1775)	unrecoeded species (only listed)		|:
Ectobiidae -
Kyoto Roach (경도바퀴)	Asiablatta kyotensis (Asahina 1976)	Can be found around rotting wood and tree sap of the southern parts	Mainland	|:
German Cockroach (바퀴/참바퀴/독일바퀴)	Blattella germanica (Linnaeus 1767)	Common domestic pest.		|:
(산바퀴)	Blattella nipponica (Asahina 1963)	Forest floor.		|:
(유리날개바퀴)	Margattea kumamotonis (Shiraki 1931)	Moist grass	Jeju-do and other islands of the southern parts. Also found in Japan.	|:
(줄바퀴)	Symploce striata (Shiraki 1906)	During the night they are found on trees and in leaf litter. rare species	Also in Japan and China.	|:
Rhinotermitidae - 2 species
(흰개미)	Reticulitermes speratus kyushuensis (Morimoto 1968)	Wet rotting wood. Wooden building pest.		|:
(칸몬흰개미)	Reticulitermes kanmonensis (Morimoto 1968)	rotting wood		|:
(집흰개미)	Coptotermes formosanus (Shiraki 1905)	Old wood houses in the southern part		|:

== Mantodea ==
Common name (Korean name)	Species (Authority)	Preferred habitat	Range	Status
Mantidae - 7 species
Chinese mantis (왕사마귀/큰사마귀)	Tenodera sinensis (Saussure, 1871)	Grass	Throughout mainland	I:
Narrow-winged mantis (사마귀	Tenodera angustipennis (Saussure, 1869)	Grass	Through mainland South Korea, Jejudo, Ulleung-do. See here for more comprehensive range.	I:
Asian jumping mantis (좀사마귀/작은사마귀)	Statilia maculata (Thunberg, 1784)	Can be found in both rural and urban areas in grass and bushes.	Throughout mainland	I:
(민무늬좀사마귀)	Statilia nemoralis (Saussure, 1870)		Gyeonggi Province	I:
(항라사마귀/유리날개사마귀)|?Mantis religiosa beybienkoi (Bazyluk, 1960)?		North Korea (?). Found in Western Siberia and Far East Russia, including Khasansky District bordering North Korea.	I:	
European mantis (항라사마귀/유리날개사마귀/엷은날개사마귀)	Mantis religiosa sinica (Bazyluk, 1960)	Grass	Central and southern part of the Korean peninsula.	|:
Giant Asian mantis (넓적배사마귀/넙적배사마귀)	Hierodula patellifera (Audinet-Serville, 1839)	Trees	Central and south	|:
(붉은긴가슴넓적배사마귀)	Hierodula chinensis (Werner, 1929)	Trees	Central and south. Introduced.	|:
(좁쌀사마귀)	Amantis nawai (Shiraki:1908)		South and Jejudo	|:
Hymenopodidae - 1 species
Japanese Boxer Mantis (애기사마귀)	Acromantis japonica (Westwood, 1889)	Usually lives around shady areas on trees, rocks and leaf litter in mountains in the southern parts.	Also found in China, Japan and Taiwan.	|:

== Bibliography ==
- 김정환 (1998). 한국의 잠자리, 메뚜기, 사마귀, 대벌레/THE ODONATA and ORTHOPTERA, ETC. OF KOREA IN COLOR. KYOHAK PUBLISHING CO., LTD. SEOUL, KOREA.
- 은하수미디어 편집부(origin of this guide book:Japan). New Wide 자연학습도감 곤충. 은하수미디어.
- 백문기, 황정미, 정광수, 김태우, 김명철 (2010). 한국 곤충 총 목록. 자연과생태.
