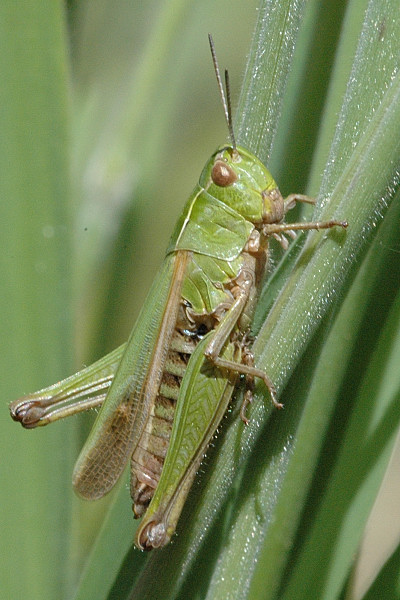
- Female
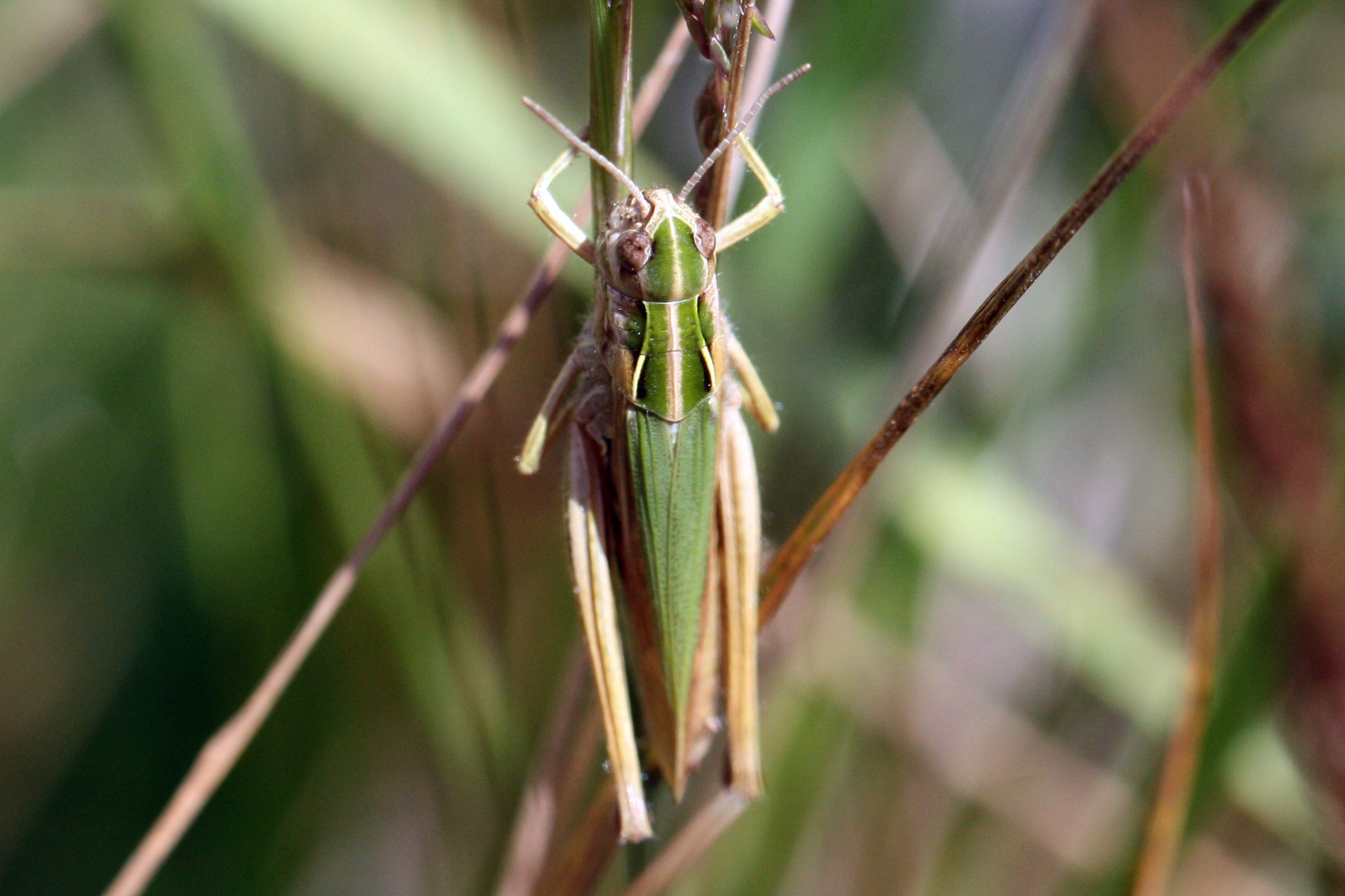
- Dorsal view

Conservation status
- Least Concern (IUCN 3.1) (Europe regional assessment)

Scientific classification
- Kingdom: Animalia
- Phylum: Arthropoda
- Class: Insecta
- Order: Orthoptera
- Suborder: Caelifera
- Family: Acrididae
- Subfamily: Gomphocerinae
- Tribe: Stenobothrini
- Genus: Omocestus
- Species: O. viridulus

Binomial name
- Omocestus viridulus (Linnaeus, 1758)

= Omocestus viridulus =

Species of grasshopper

Close-Up of a Omocestus viridulus

Omocestus viridulus, known in the British Isles as the common green grasshopper, is a Palearctic species of grasshopper in the subfamily Gomphocerinae.

== Morphology ==
Omocestus viridulus are usually green all over, but some may have brown coloration on the sides. In Scandinavia, they are usually green or light brown. The males do not have any red coloring on the abdomen and possess a noticeably long ovipositor, characteristics that help distinguish it from the similar species O. rufipes and O. haemorrhoidalis. The eyes of this species may be brown or yellow. The typical body length is 17–20 millimetres (0.67–0.79 in). They possess a strongly darkened region of the hind wing.

== Distribution and habitat ==
Omocestus viridulus typically lives in moderately wet regions around Europe except north of the Arctic Circle, and it is distributed widely over Britain. Its range extends east as far as Siberia and Mongolia. Their preferred habitat consists of areas with longer grass.

== Diet and life cycle ==
This species prefers to feed on the more common, abundant grass species and this may promote greater diversity of vegetation. O. viridulus feeds on grass from the genera Dactylis, Agrostis, Anthoxanthum, Lolium and Holcus. The life cycle begins with the females laying their clutch of eggs in the top layer of soil or near the root of the grass stalks. The young are called nymphs and emerge the next April. These nymphs resemble miniature versions of the adults with immature wings. After about a month of moulting their exoskeleton several times, they mature into adults with working wings. There is one generation of O. viridulus a year, and they are usually seen between the months of April and October.

== Reproduction ==
Compared to other grasshopper species, the reproductive fitness of O. viridulus tends to be less affected by temperature changes. It has been found that for female O. viridulus, the number of eggs in each pod, and the mass of eggs were not adversely affected by temperature. In the wild, the males find the females quickly and mate, and the females refrain from singing until they lay at least one cluster of eggs. If the male fails to mate with a female, he will sing before trying again.

== Song ==
Omocestus viridulus stridulation
Song of Omocestus viridulus, 8min 0s

Sound of Omocestus viridulus
Field recording in the Netherlands 22s

Songs are produced by a process called stridulation in which the hind leg and wing are rubbed together. Calling songs are used by these grasshoppers in order to attract and find a mate. Although most of the singing is done by the males, females that are ready to mate may also sing in response. The females also use stridulation to produce their songs. The male normally sings only one calling song in one place before moving on to another spot to try calling again. However, occasionally they may call more than once in the same spot.

Ticking is another sound that is produced when the male flicks the hind part of its back leg against one of its fore wings (the process is called a tibial flick). In the courtship process, the frequency of these tibial flicks does not follow a regular pattern and is highly variable between 5 and 15 ticks repeated roughly every 1 to 2 seconds. Geographical variation is also present in the mating song of this species. In Spain, where this grasshopper exists as the subspecies O. viridulus kaesteneri, the song tends to be shorter than in other regions. When singing to a female, one of the hind legs is moved at a much wider angle than the other and this generates most of the sound.

The songs are characterised by crescendos that make up a significant part of the song. The songs start quietly and increase until it reaches the greatest intensity, and then dies out. The males usually follow up their calling songs with a succession of loud syllables and then try to mate with the female. When the male is calling to a female, there is a greater amplitude of movement for the hind leg facing the female. Males call when a female is close by, and these songs last about 45–60 seconds each with breaks of 10–15 s in between. Various studies have been performed on the songs of O. viridulus. Heinrich et al. demonstrated that singing in both males and females can be induced with the injection of acetylcholine. A study by Eiríksson revealed that the males of this species can use their songs most efficiently based on how frequently they sing and how they time their songs, as it is important that the males minimize the overlap of their songs with the females' song so that they can find each other. If the female sings at the same time as the male, the male might not hear the female's song. The males try to minimize this overlap in songs because he must be able to hear the female's song in order to locate her.
