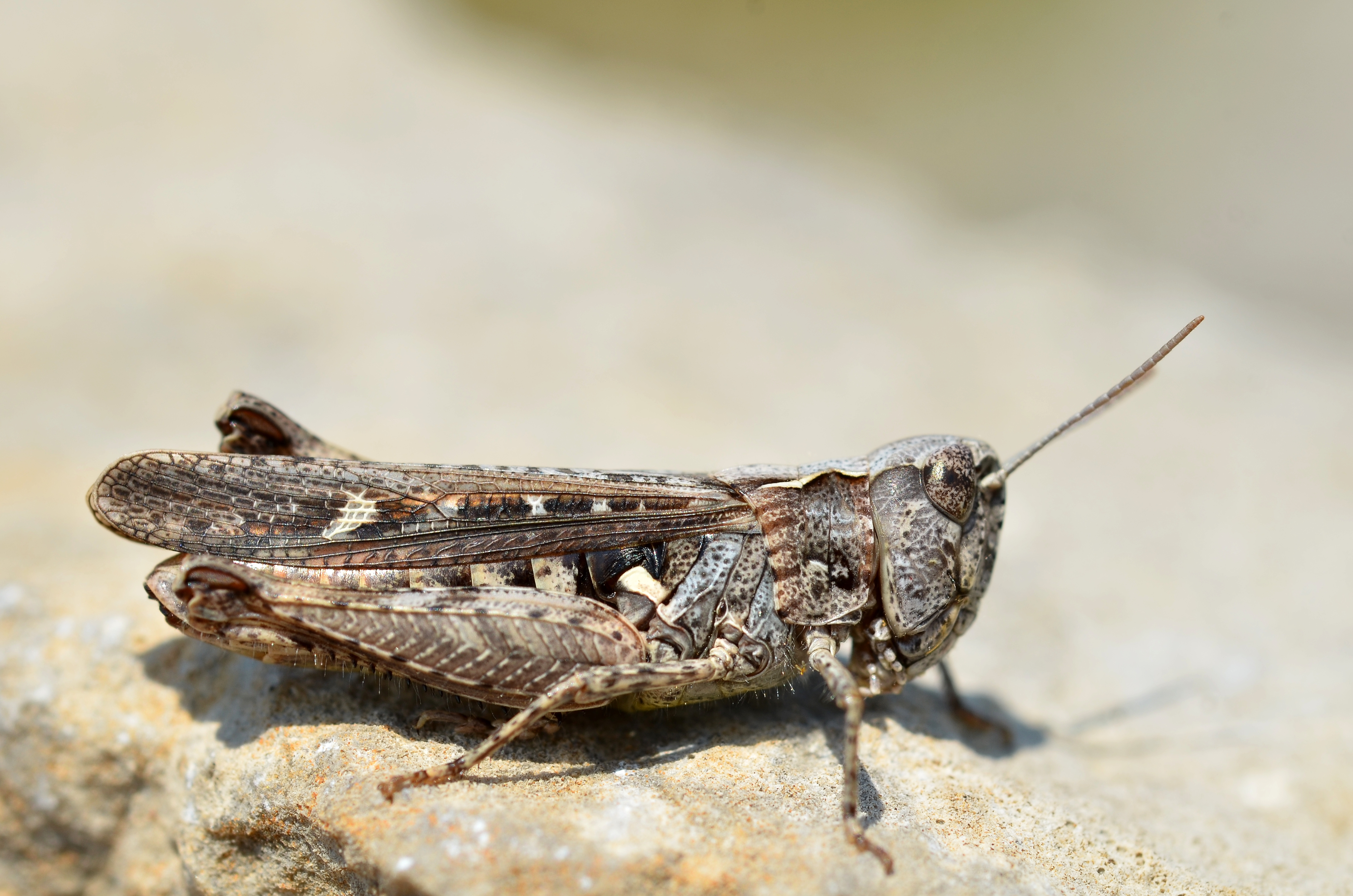
- Omocestus raymondi, France

Scientific classification
- Kingdom: Animalia
- Phylum: Arthropoda
- Class: Insecta
- Order: Orthoptera
- Suborder: Caelifera
- Family: Acrididae
- Subfamily: Gomphocerinae
- Tribe: Stenobothrini
- Genus: Omocestus
- Species: O. raymondi

Binomial name
- Omocestus raymondi (Yersin, 1863)

= Omocestus raymondi =

Species of grasshopper

Omocestus raymondi is a species of slant-faced grasshopper in the family Acrididae. It is found in southern Europe and northern Africa.
