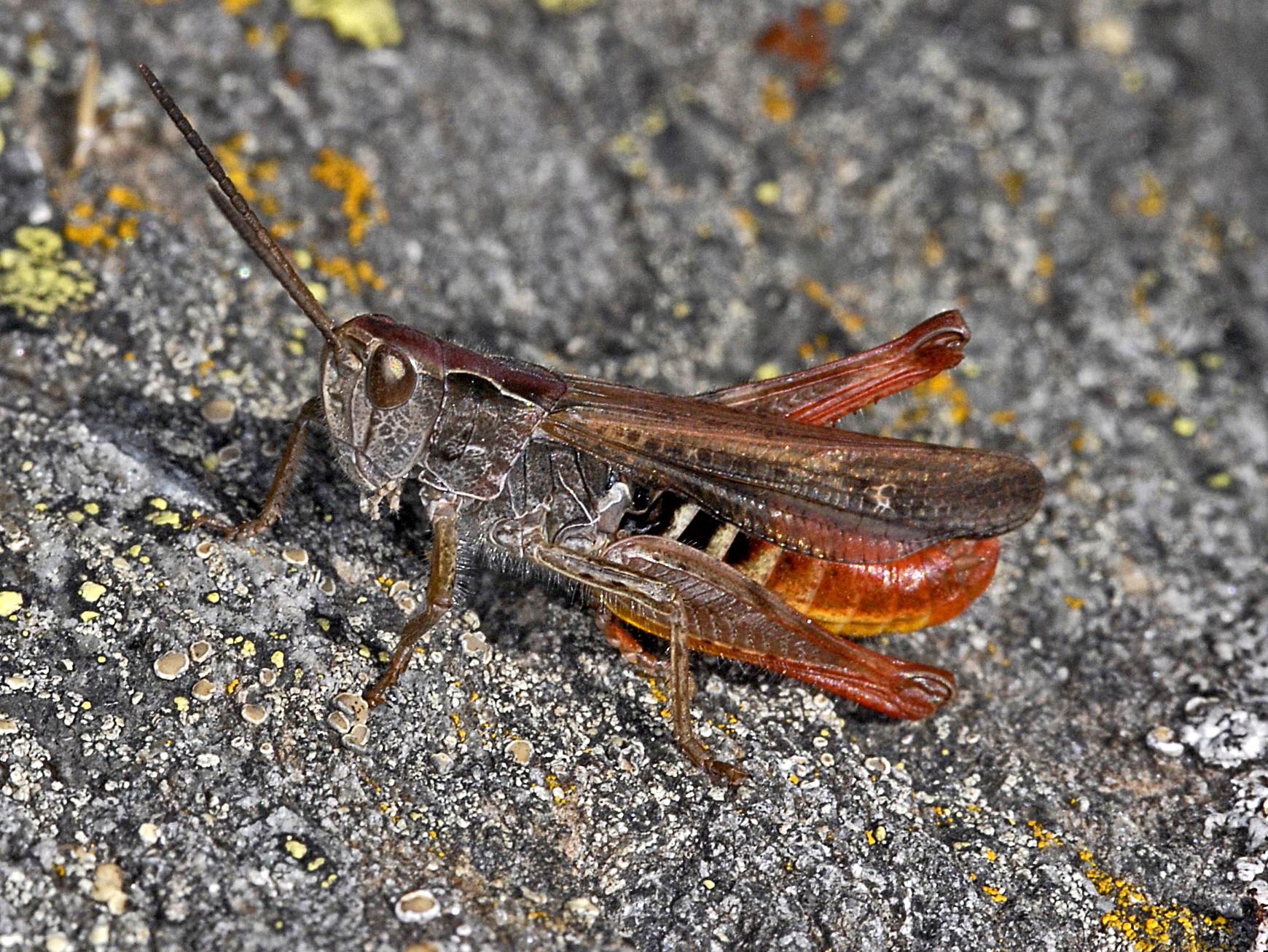
- Omocestus rufipes

Scientific classification
- Kingdom: Animalia
- Phylum: Arthropoda
- Clade: Pancrustacea
- Class: Insecta
- Order: Orthoptera
- Suborder: Caelifera
- Family: Acrididae
- Tribe: Stenobothrini
- Genus: Omocestus; Bolívar, 1878

= Omocestus =

Genus of grasshoppers

Omocestus is a genus of 'short-horned grasshoppers' belonging to the family Acrididae subfamily Gomphocerinae.

== Species ==
Species within this genus include:

- Omocestus (Dreuxius) Defaut, 1988
  - Omocestus alluaudi Uvarov, 1927
  - Omocestus antigai (Bolívar, 1897)
  - Omocestus bolivari Chopard, 1939
  - Omocestus femoralis Bolívar, 1908
  - Omocestus lecerfi Chopard, 1937
  - Omocestus lepineyi Chopard, 1937
  - Omocestus minutissimus (Brullé, 1832)
  - Omocestus navasi Bolívar, 1908
    - Omocestus navasi bellmani
  - Omocestus uhagonii (Bolívar, 1876–1878)
- Omocestus (Haplomocestus) Tarbinsky, 1930
  - Omocestus caucasicus Tarbinsky, 1930
- Unidentified subgenus
  - Omocestus defauti Sardet & Braud, 2007
  - Omocestus fontanai Massa, 2004
  - Omocestus laojunshanensis Mao & Xu, 2004
  - Omocestus maershanensis Mao & Xu, 2004
  - Omocestus pinanensis Zheng & Xie, 2001
  - Omocestus qinghaiuensis Zheng & Xie, 2001
  - Omocestus xinjiangensis Liu, 1995
  - Omocestus zhenglanensis Zheng & Han, 1998
- Omocestus (Omocestus) Bolívar, 1878
  - Omocestus africanus Harz, 1970
  - Omocestus aymonissabaudiae Salfi, 1934
  - Omocestus cuonaensis Yin, 1984
  - Omocestus demokidovi Ramme, 1930
  - Omocestus enitor Uvarov, 1925
  - Omocestus haemorrhoidalis (Charpentier, 1825)
  - Omocestus harzi Nadig, 1988
  - Omocestus heymonsi (Ramme, 1926)
  - Omocestus hubeiensis Wang & Li, 1994
  - Omocestus lopadusae La Greca, 1973
  - Omocestus lucasii (Brisout de Barneville, 1850)
  - Omocestus megaoculus Yin, 1984
  - Omocestus minutus (Brullé, 1832)
  - Omocestus motuoensis Yin, 1984
  - Omocestus nadigi Harz, 1987
  - Omocestus nanus Uvarov, 1934
  - Omocestus nigripennus Zheng, 1993
  - Omocestus nyalamus Hsia, 1981
  - Omocestus panteli (Bolívar, 1887)
  - Omocestus petraeus (Brisout de Barneville, 1855)
  - Omocestus raymondi (Yersin, 1863)
  - Omocestus rufipes (Zetterstedt, 1821)
  - Omocestus simonyi (Krauss, 1892)
  - Omocestus tibetanus Uvarov, 1939
  - Omocestus tzendsureni Harz, 1970
  - Omocestus uvarovi Zanon, 1926
  - Omocestus viridulus (Linnaeus, 1758)
  - Omocestus znojkoi Mishchenko, 1951
