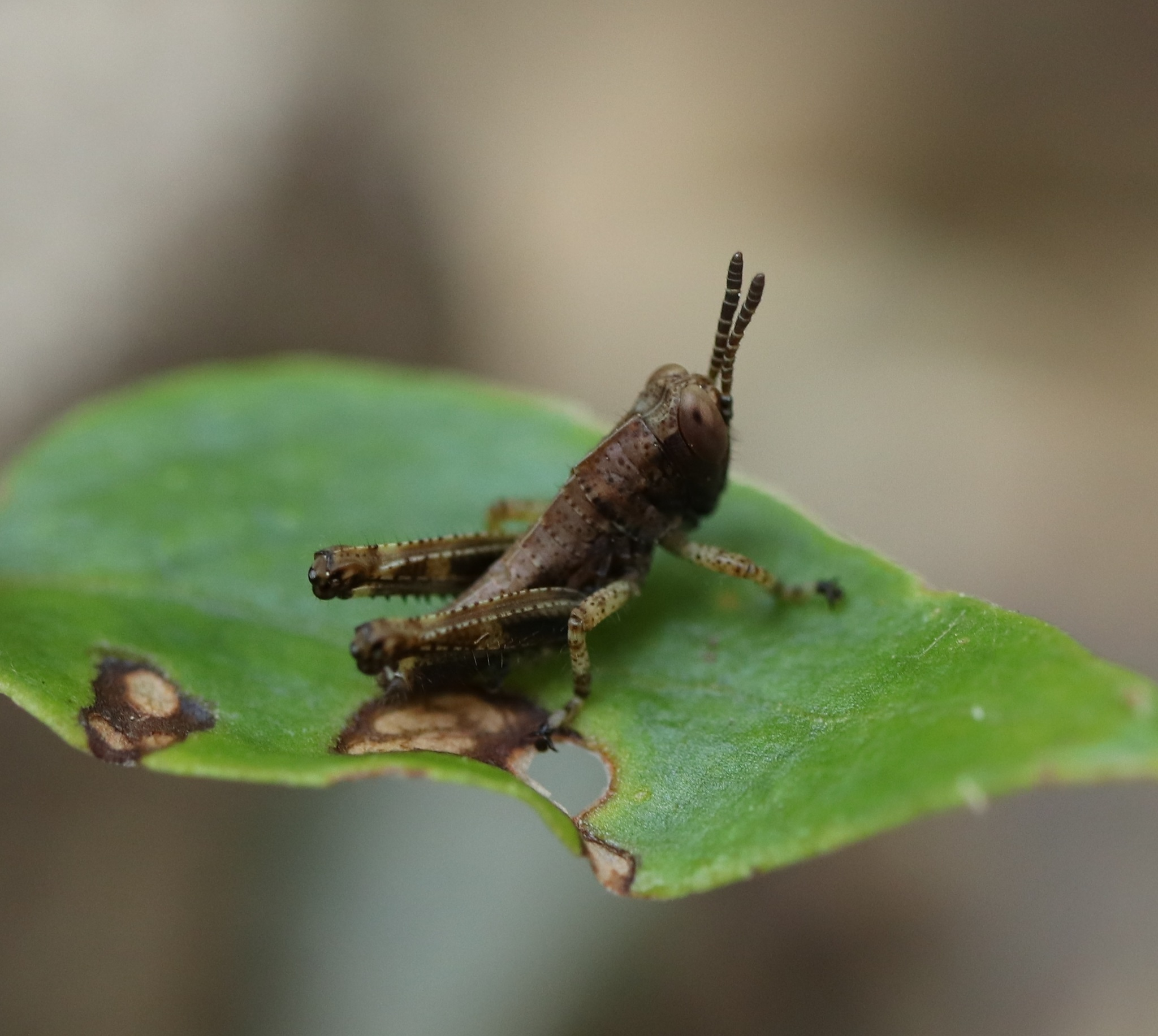
- Parapodisma tenryuensis, Japan
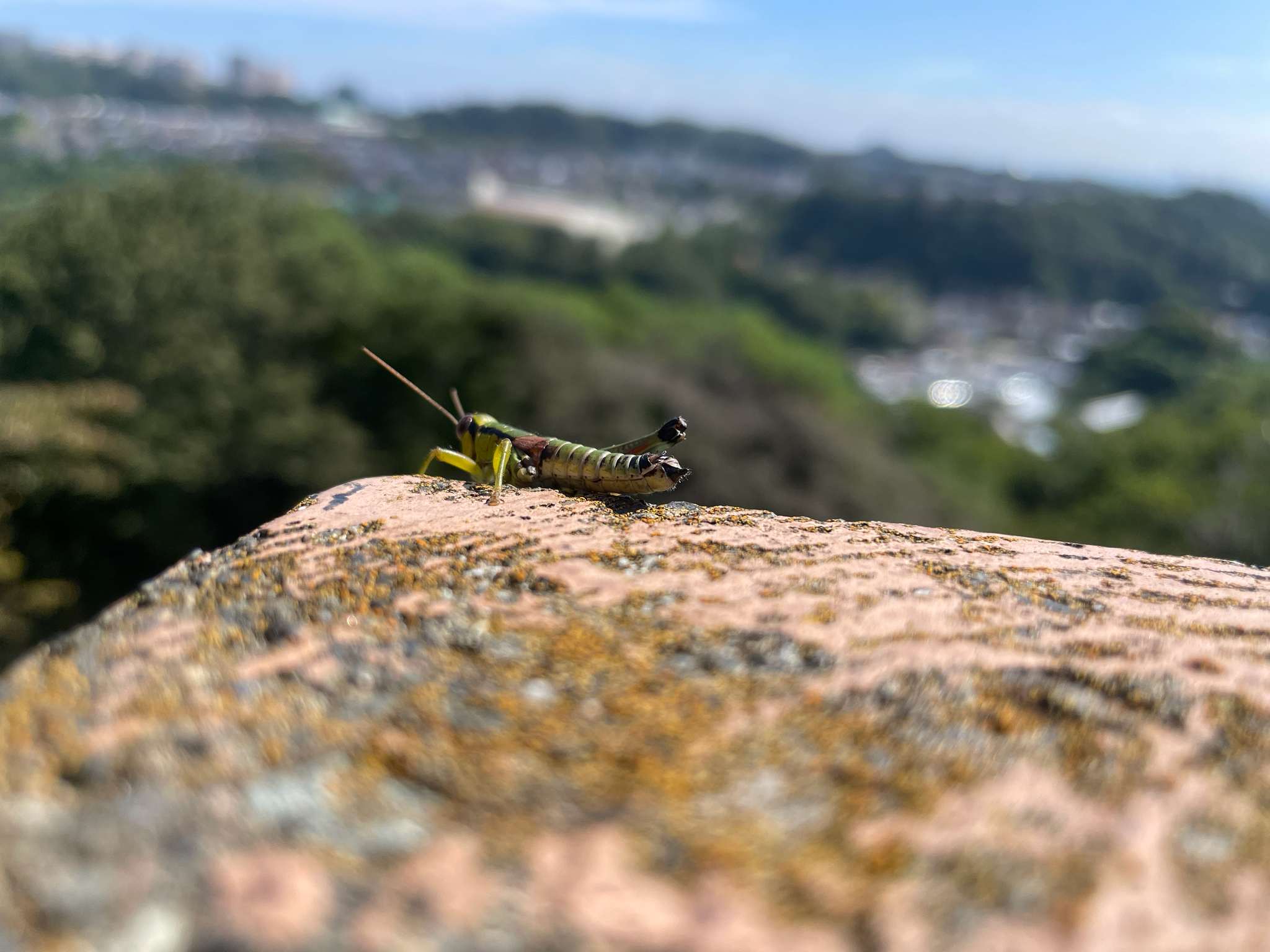
- Parapodisma tenryuensis, Kanazawa Natural Park, Japan

Scientific classification
- Kingdom: Animalia
- Phylum: Arthropoda
- Clade: Pancrustacea
- Class: Insecta
- Order: Orthoptera
- Suborder: Caelifera
- Family: Acrididae
- Subfamily: Melanoplinae
- Tribe: Podismini
- Subtribe: Tonkinacridina
- Genus: Parapodisma
- Species: P. tenryuensis

Binomial name
- Parapodisma tenryuensis Kobayashi, 1983

= Parapodisma tenryuensis =

Species of spur-throated grasshopper

Parapodisma tenryuensis is a species of spur-throated grasshopper in the family Acrididae. It is found in Japan.
