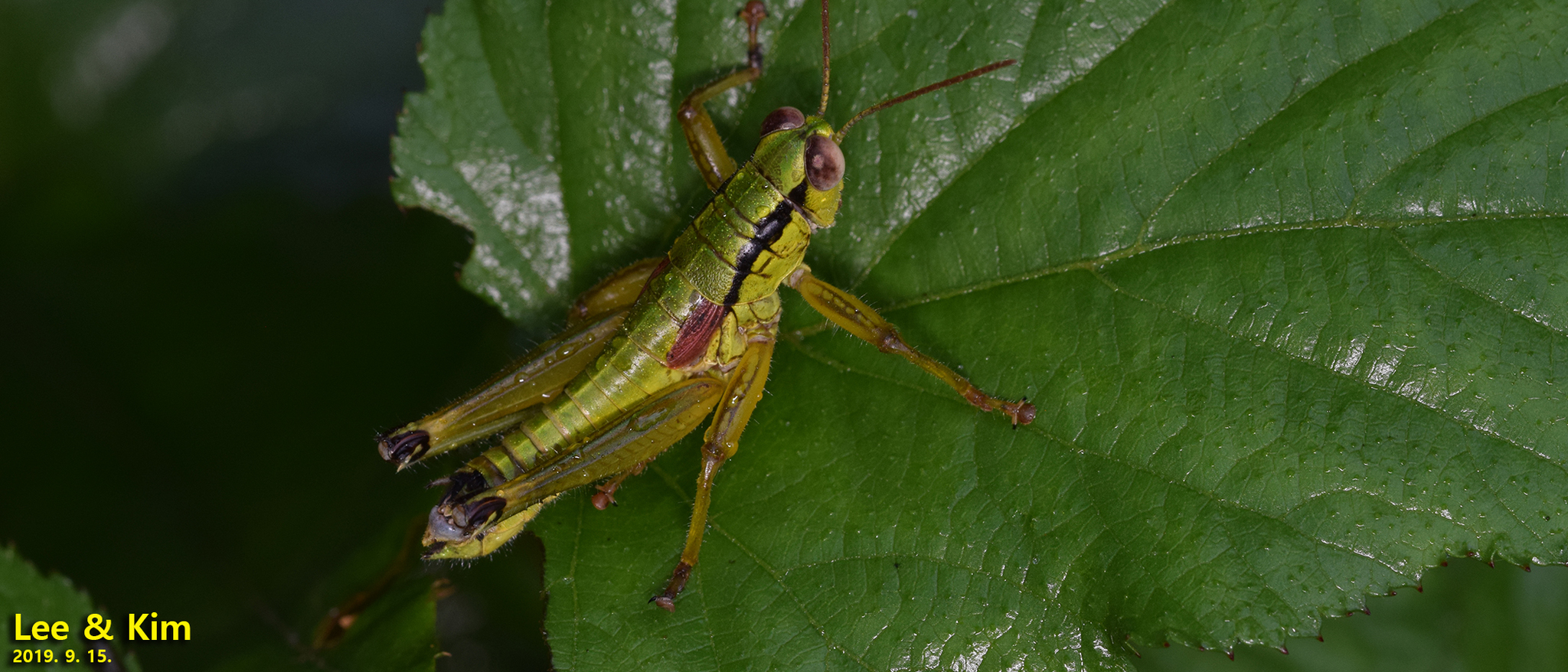
- Anapodisma miramae, South Korea

Scientific classification
- Kingdom: Animalia
- Phylum: Arthropoda
- Clade: Pancrustacea
- Class: Insecta
- Order: Orthoptera
- Suborder: Caelifera
- Family: Acrididae
- Subfamily: Melanoplinae
- Tribe: Podismini
- Subtribe: Miramellina
- Genus: Anapodisma; Dovnar-Zapolskij, 1932

= Anapodisma =

Genus of grasshoppers

Anapodisma is a genus of spur-throated grasshoppers in the family Acrididae. There are at least four described species in Anapodisma, found in eastern Asia.

== Species ==
These species belong to the genus Anapodisma:

- Anapodisma beybienkoi Rentz & Miller, 1971
- Anapodisma miramae Dovnar-Zapolskij, 1932
- Anapodisma qingyuan (Ren, Zhang & Cao, 1995)
- Anapodisma rufipennis (Zhang & Xia, 1990)
