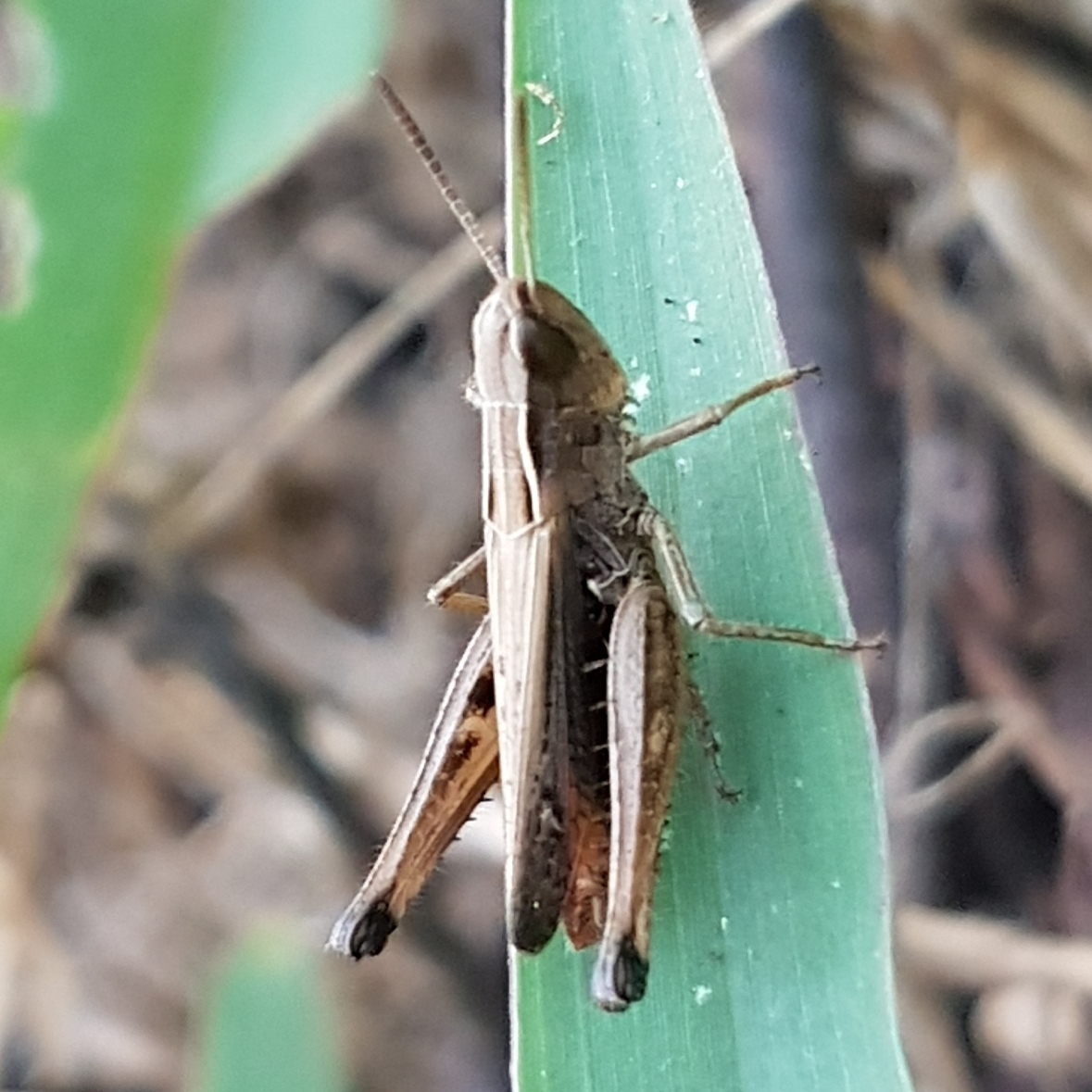
- Omocestus panteli, Pantel's grasshopper, Portugal

Conservation status
- Least Concern (IUCN 3.1)

Scientific classification
- Domain: Eukaryota
- Kingdom: Animalia
- Phylum: Arthropoda
- Class: Insecta
- Order: Orthoptera
- Suborder: Caelifera
- Family: Acrididae
- Genus: Omocestus
- Species: O. panteli

Binomial name
- Omocestus panteli (Bolívar, 1887)

= Omocestus panteli =

Species of slant-faced grasshopper

Omocestus panteli, or Pantel's grasshopper, is a species of slant-faced grasshopper in the family Acrididae. It is found on the Iberian Peninsula.

The IUCN conservation status of Omocestus panteli is "LC", least concern, with no immediate threat to the species' survival. The IUCN status was assessed in 2015. Their genetics have still been impacted by the Last Glacial Maximum, with three genetically distinct clusters in northwestern, central-southern, and northeastern Iberia.
