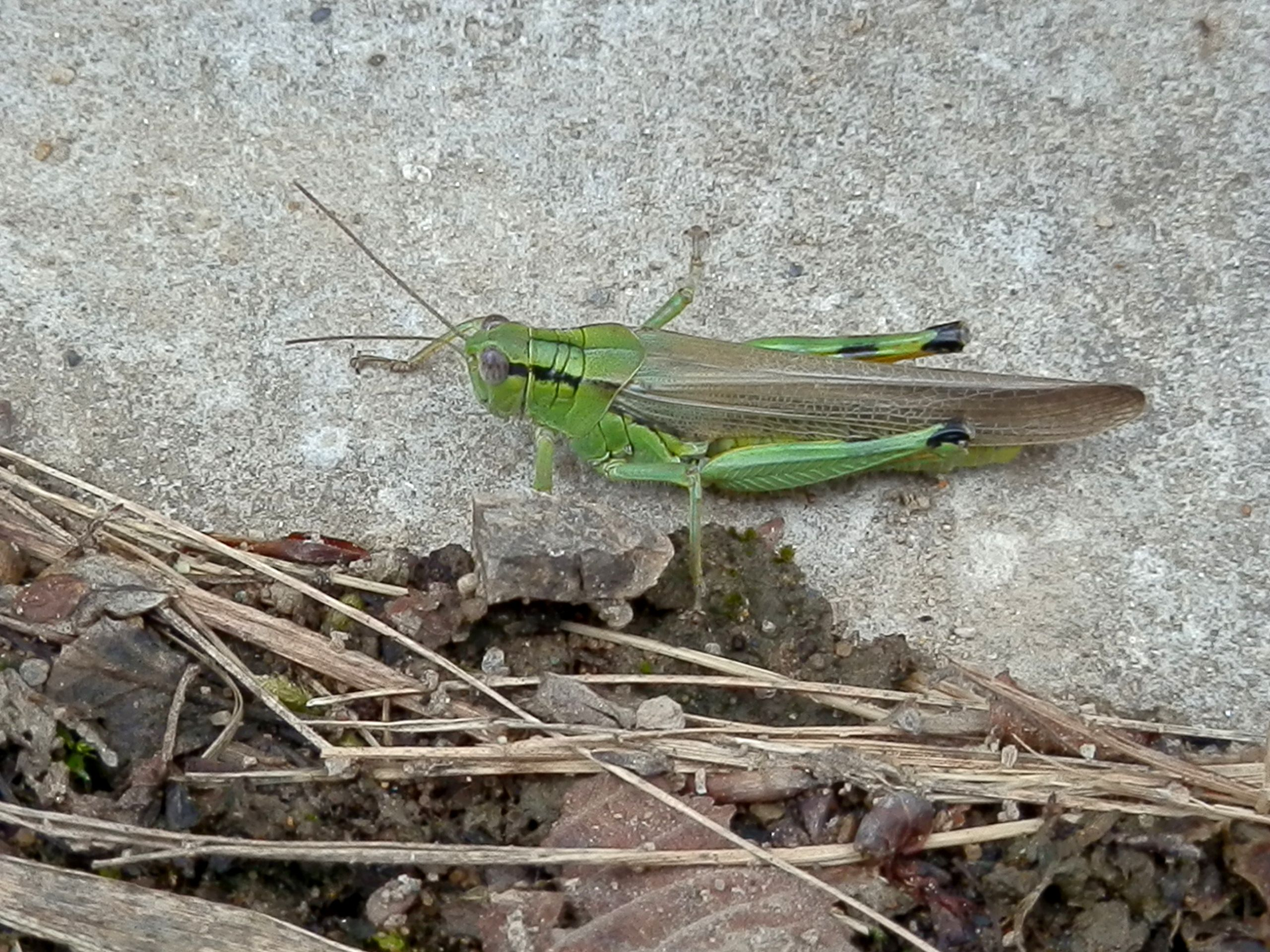
- Ognevia longipennis

Scientific classification
- Kingdom: Animalia
- Phylum: Arthropoda
- Clade: Pancrustacea
- Class: Insecta
- Order: Orthoptera
- Suborder: Caelifera
- Family: Acrididae
- Subfamily: Melanoplinae
- Tribe: Podismini
- Subtribe: Podismina
- Genus: Ognevia; Ikonnikov, 1911

= Ognevia =

Genus of grasshoppers

Ognevia is a genus of spur-throated grasshoppers in the family Acrididae. There are at least three described species in Ognevia, found in Asia.

== Species ==
These species belong to the genus Ognevia:

- Ognevia longipennis (Shiraki, 1910)
- Ognevia sergii Ikonnikov, 1911
- Ognevia taiwanensis Yin, Zhi & Ye, 2015
