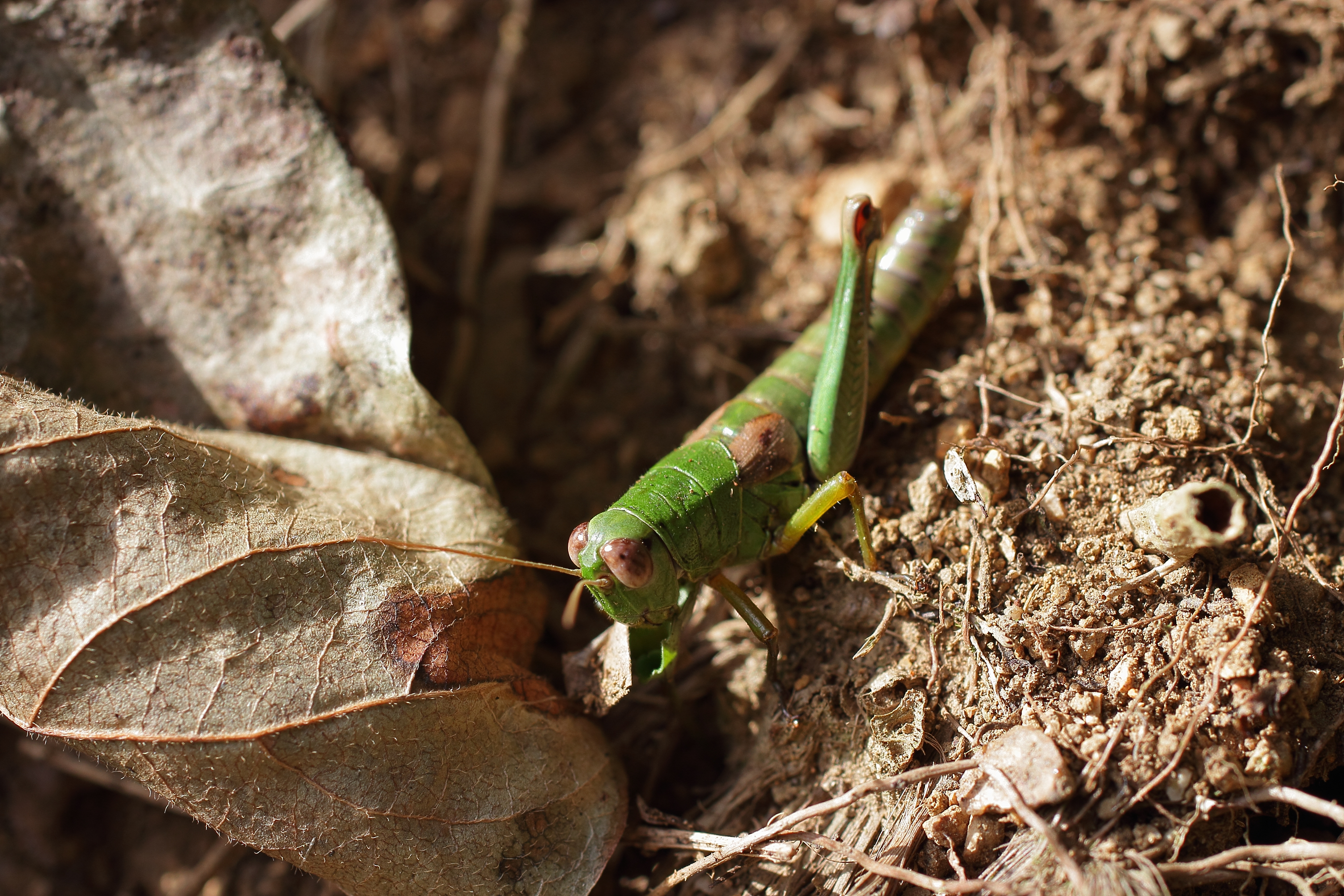
- Parapodisma setouchiensis

Scientific classification
- Kingdom: Animalia
- Phylum: Arthropoda
- Clade: Pancrustacea
- Class: Insecta
- Order: Orthoptera
- Suborder: Caelifera
- Family: Acrididae
- Subfamily: Melanoplinae
- Tribe: Podismini
- Subtribe: Tonkinacridina
- Genus: Parapodisma; Mistshenko, 1947

= Parapodisma =

Genus of grasshoppers

Parapodisma is a genus of spur-throated grasshoppers in the family Acrididae. There are about 12 described species in Parapodisma, found in Japan, China, and South Korea.

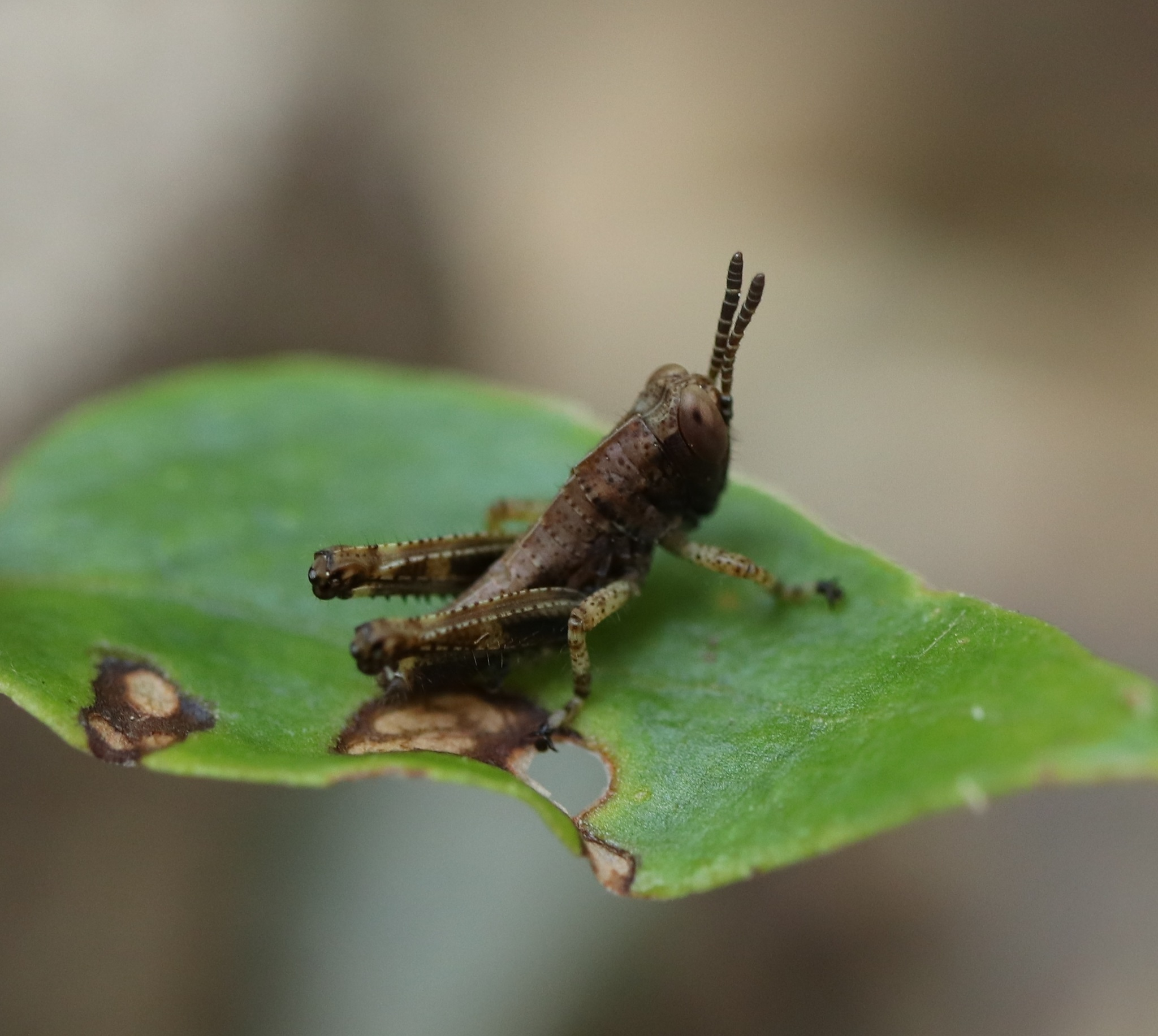
Parapodisma tenryuensis, Japan

== Species ==
These 12 species belong to the genus Parapodisma:

- Parapodisma astris Huang, 2006 (China)
- Parapodisma awagatakensis Ishikawa, 1998 (Japan)
- Parapodisma caelestis Tominaga & Ishikawa, 2001 (Japan)
- Parapodisma dairisama (Scudder, 1897) (Japan)
- Parapodisma etsukoana Kobayashi, 1986 (Japan)
- Parapodisma mikado (Bolívar, 1890) (Japan)
- Parapodisma niihamensis Inoue, 1979 (Japan)
- Parapodisma setouchiensis Inoue, 1979 (Japan and South Korea)
- Parapodisma subastris Huang, 1983 (Japan)
- Parapodisma takeii (Takei, 1914) (Japan)
- Parapodisma tenryuensis Kobayashi, 1983 (Japan)
- Parapodisma yasumatsui Yamasaki, 1980 (Japan)
