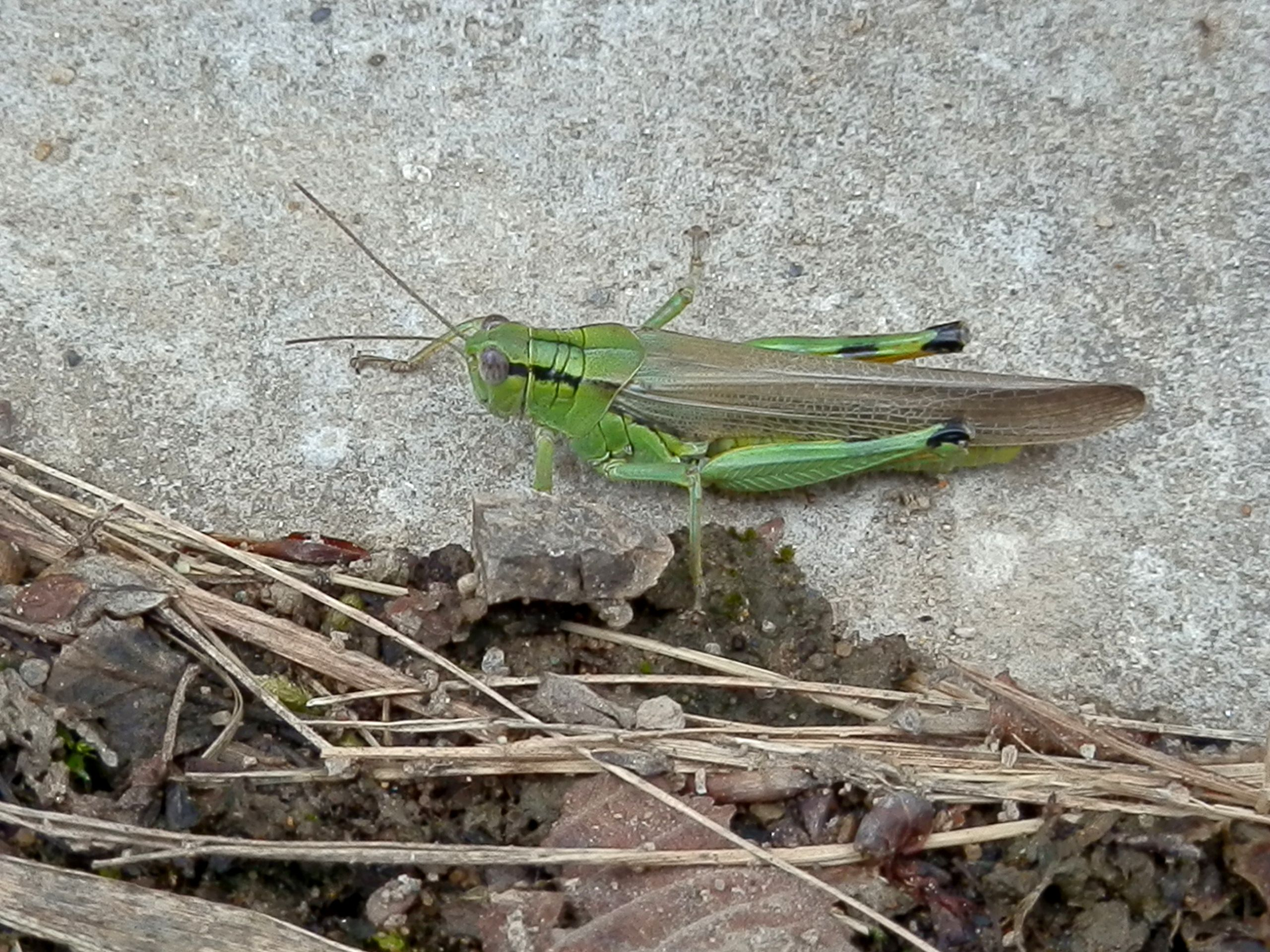
- Ognevia longipennis

Scientific classification
- Kingdom: Animalia
- Phylum: Arthropoda
- Clade: Pancrustacea
- Class: Insecta
- Order: Orthoptera
- Suborder: Caelifera
- Family: Acrididae
- Subfamily: Melanoplinae
- Tribe: Podismini
- Subtribe: Podismina
- Genus: Ognevia
- Species: O. longipennis

Binomial name
- Ognevia longipennis (Shiraki, 1910)

= Ognevia longipennis =

Species of grasshopper

Ognevia longipennis is a species of spur-throated grasshopper in the family Acrididae. It is found in the Palearctic.
