= Ognevia sergii =

Scientific classification
- Domain: Eukaryota
- Kingdom: Animalia
- Phylum: Arthropoda
- Class: Insecta
- Order: Orthoptera
- Suborder: Caelifera
- Family: Acrididae
- Subfamily: Melanoplinae
- Tribe: Podismini
- Subtribe: Podismina
- Genus: Ognevia
- Species: O. sergii

Binomial name
- Ognevia sergii Ikonnikov, 1911

Species of spur-throated grasshopper

Ognevia sergii is a species of spur-throated grasshopper in the family Acrididae. It is found in eastern Asia.
