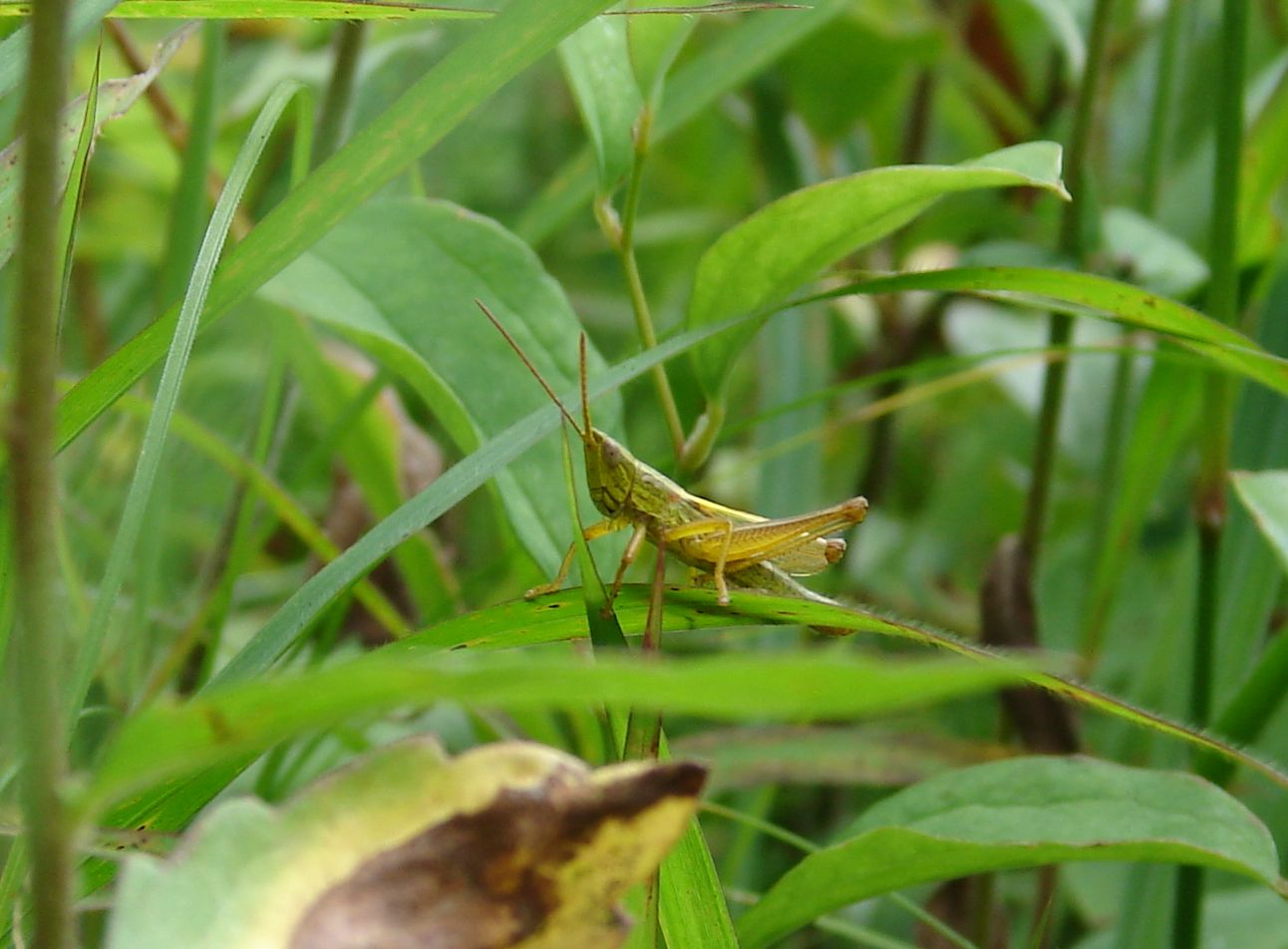
- Mongolotettix japonicus, Japan

Scientific classification
- Kingdom: Animalia
- Phylum: Arthropoda
- Clade: Pancrustacea
- Class: Insecta
- Order: Orthoptera
- Suborder: Caelifera
- Family: Acrididae
- Subfamily: Gomphocerinae
- Tribe: Chrysochraontini
- Genus: Mongolotettix
- Species: M. japonicus

Binomial name
- Mongolotettix japonicus (Bolívar, 1898)

= Mongolotettix japonicus =

Species of grasshopper

Mongolotettix japonicus is a species of slant-faced grasshopper in the family Acrididae. It is found in eastern Asia.
