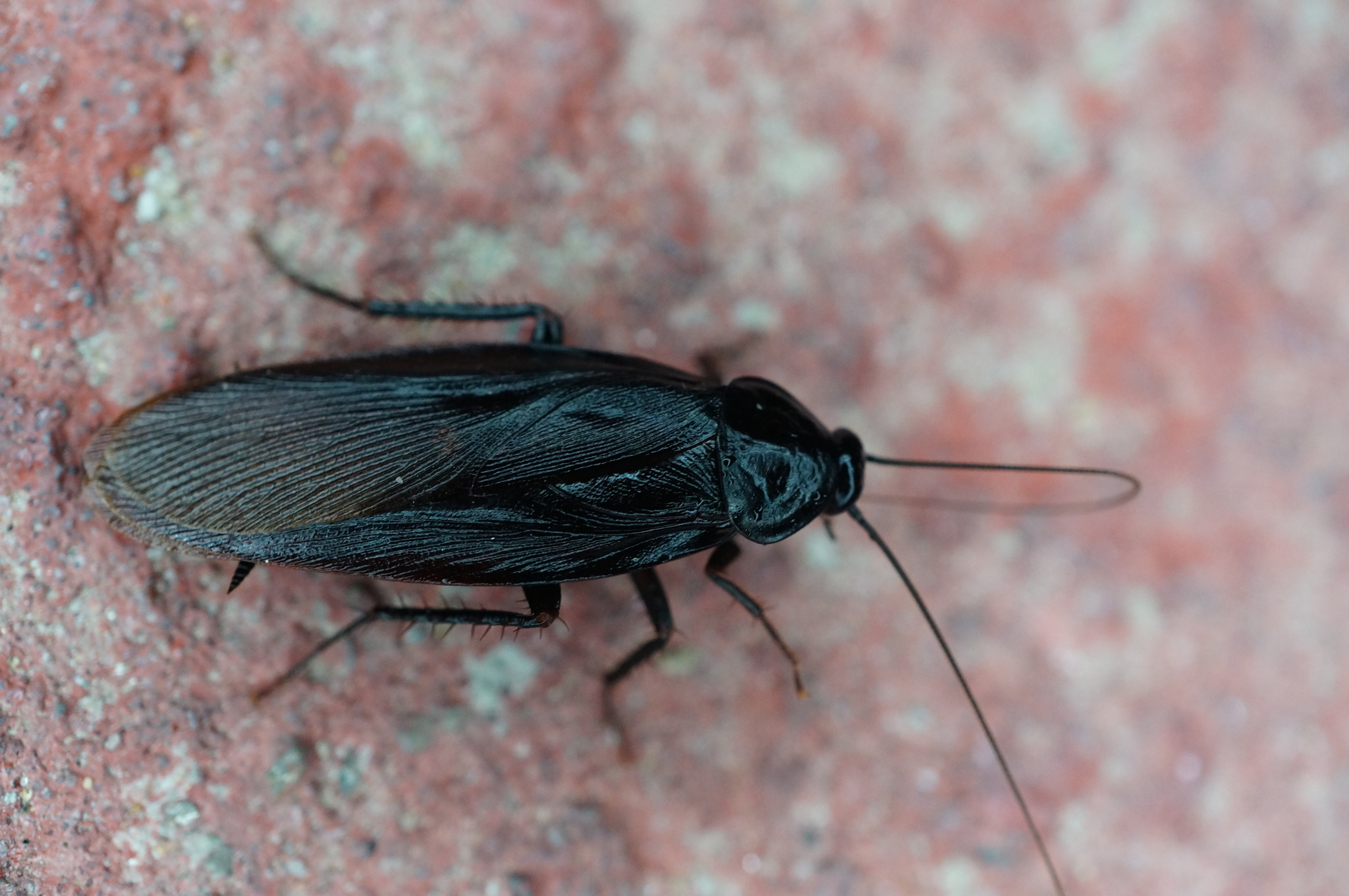

Scientific classification
- Kingdom: Animalia
- Phylum: Arthropoda
- Clade: Pancrustacea
- Class: Insecta
- Order: Blattodea
- Family: Blattidae
- Genus: Crescispina
- Species: C. japonica

Binomial name
- Crescispina japonica (Karny, 1908)

= Japanese cockroach =

Species of cockroach

The Japanese cockroach (Crescispina japonica), synonym Periplaneta japonica, also known as the Yamato cockroach, is a cockroach native to Japan, adapted to cooler northern climates. It has a flexible univoltine or semivoltine (one- or two-year) life cycle, depending on the timing of its hatching, and is unusual in being able to spend two winters as diapause nymphs before reaching maturity.

== Description ==
Initial first-instar nymphs are dark brown, with white or brownish white tips of the maxillary and labial palps. Adults measure 25–35 millimetres (2 1/2–3 1/2 cm) in length, and have a shiny, uniformly black to blackish-brown body, with brown tarsi and maxillary and labial palps. The adult male's wings extend slightly beyond the body's length, while the female's wings are around half the body's length.

Unlike most cockroaches, the major hydrocarbon in C. japonica’s cuticular lipids is cis-9-nonacosene. Males have significant amounts of cis-9-heptacosene not found on females, as do V. australasiae and V. fuliginosa males and females. Glucose, myo-inositol, scyllo-inositol and trehalose were found in overwintering nymphs and are thought to be a factor in their freeze tolerance.

== Freeze tolerance ==
Nymphs have been observed in the wild hibernating in subfreezing temperatures during winter in snow-covered habitats. Overwintering nymphs were able to survive laboratory supercooling experiments in the −5 to −8 °C (23 to 18 °F) temperature range, enduring 12 hours of tissue freezing, as well as recover from burial in ice. The ability to walk on ice was also found to be unique among several cockroach species tested.

== Habitat ==
Primarily an outdoors species, populations are adaptable to living indoors in houses and buildings where food is stored, prepared, or served.

== Defense ==
A C. japonica nymph alone or in sparse populations accumulates a viscous secretion along its rear dorsal surface, droplets of which it can be splashed some distance toward a threat through a shaking action. The presence of an aggressive species of ant, Formica exsecta, triggered this defensive response, rendering the ants helpless.

== Presence as an introduced species ==
Originally from Japan, C. japonica has spread to China, Korea and far eastern Russia, though it is considered a common pest primarily in central and northern Japan.

The species was found in New York City in 2013 by Evangelista et al., the first time the species was found in the United States. It was found by an exterminator beneath plantings in High Line, a Manhattan park, and was able to survive over a cold winter. Scientists who confirmed the identity of the species through genetic testing theorize that it may have been imported in the soil of ornamental plants used in the park. This identification demonstrates the use of DNA barcoding for urban pest control.
