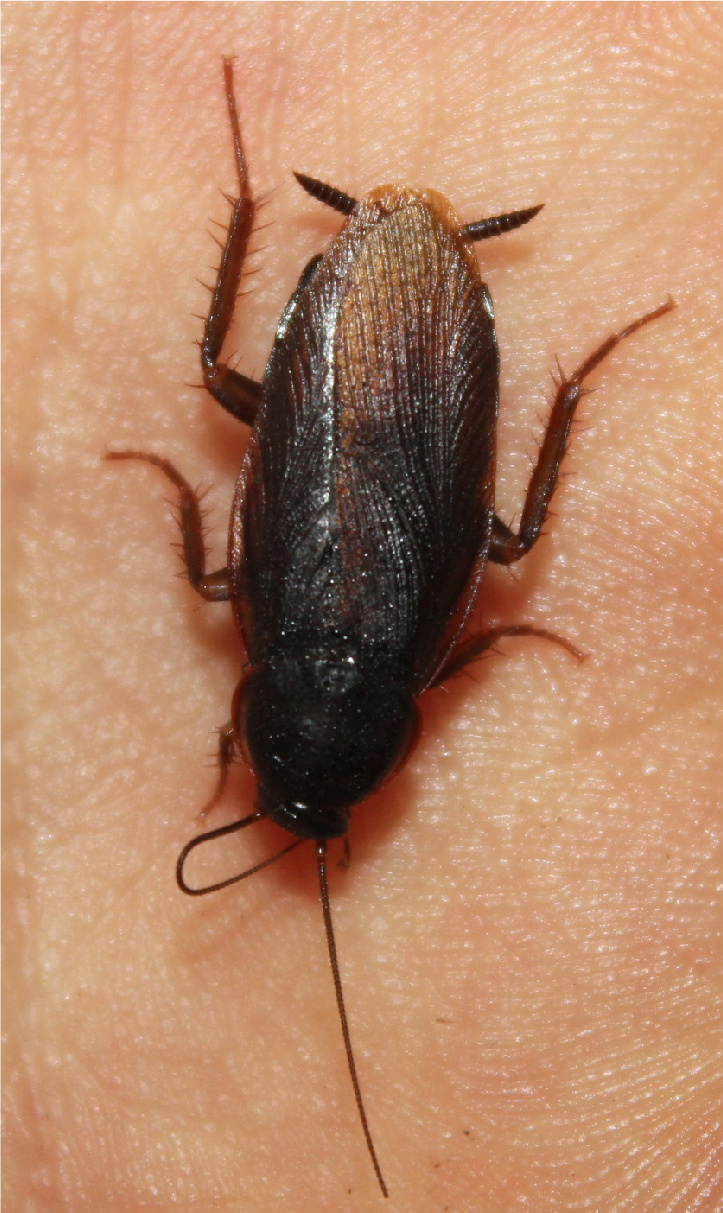
- Adult female Asiablatta kyotensis

Scientific classification
- Kingdom: Animalia
- Phylum: Arthropoda
- Class: Insecta
- Order: Blattodea
- Family: Ectobiidae
- Subfamily: Blattellinae
- Genus: Asiablatta
- Species: A. kyotensis

Binomial name
- Asiablatta kyotensis Asahina, 1976

Synonyms
- Parcoblatta kyotensis Asahina, 1976

= Asiablatta kyotensis =

Species of cockroach

Asiablatta kyotensis, formerly in the genus Parcoblatta, is an endemic roach from Far Eastern Asia. On June 24, 1962, an unfamiliar male roach was captured in Kyoto City. This cockroach was an entirely unknown insect from Japan, and was later described as Parcoblatta kyotensis by Asahina in 1976.

== Habitat ==
Found gathered around rotting trees and tree sap.

== Distribution ==
A. kyotensis are known to be in China (Shanghai, Zhejiang), Japan, southern and western parts of South Korea.

== Description ==
Male: Body length measures around 14.5 to 18 millimeters, forewing length measures from 13 to 15.5 millimeters. Adult females are broader and have slightly shorter wings than adult males.

== Gallery ==
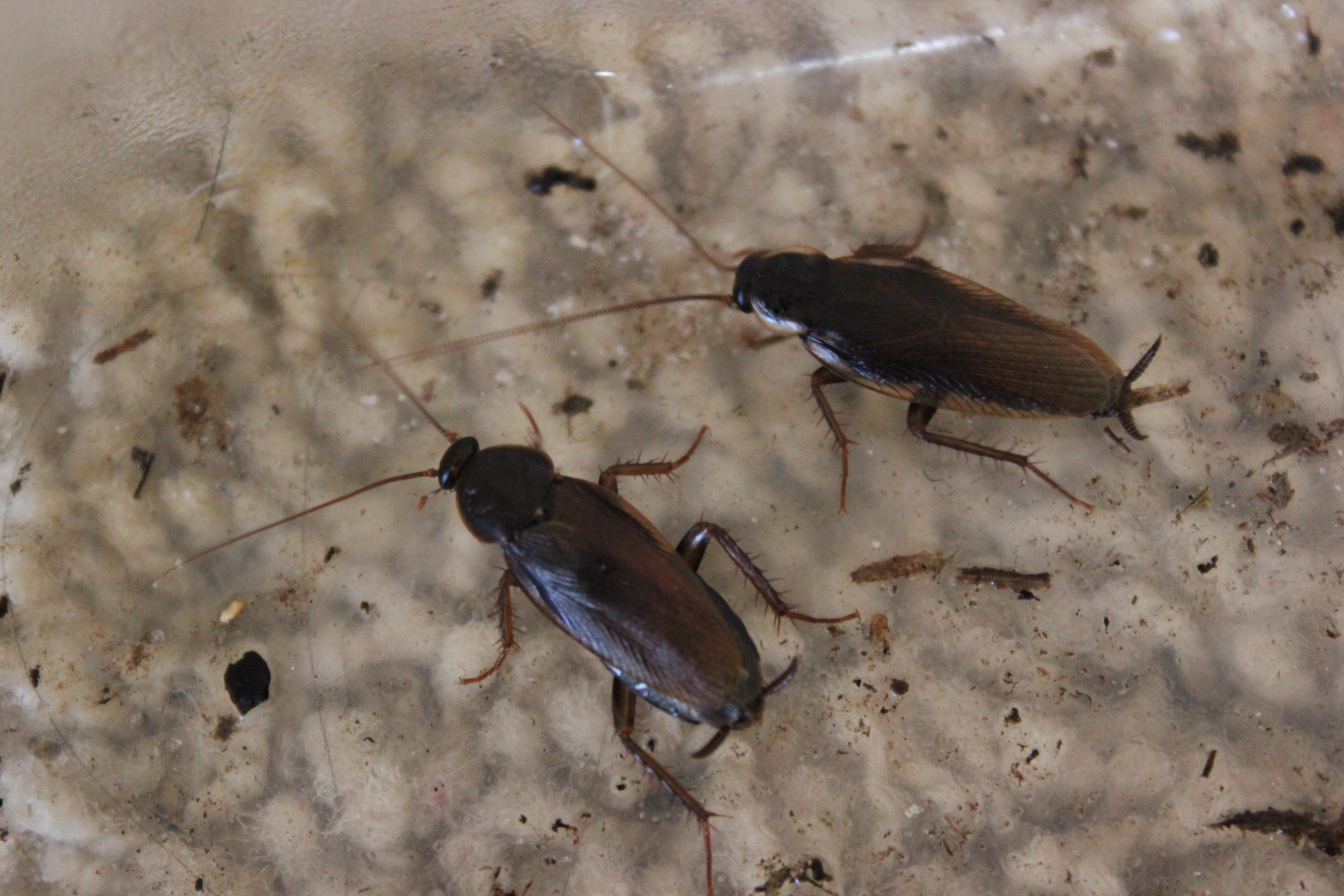
Adult female and male Asiablatta kyotensis

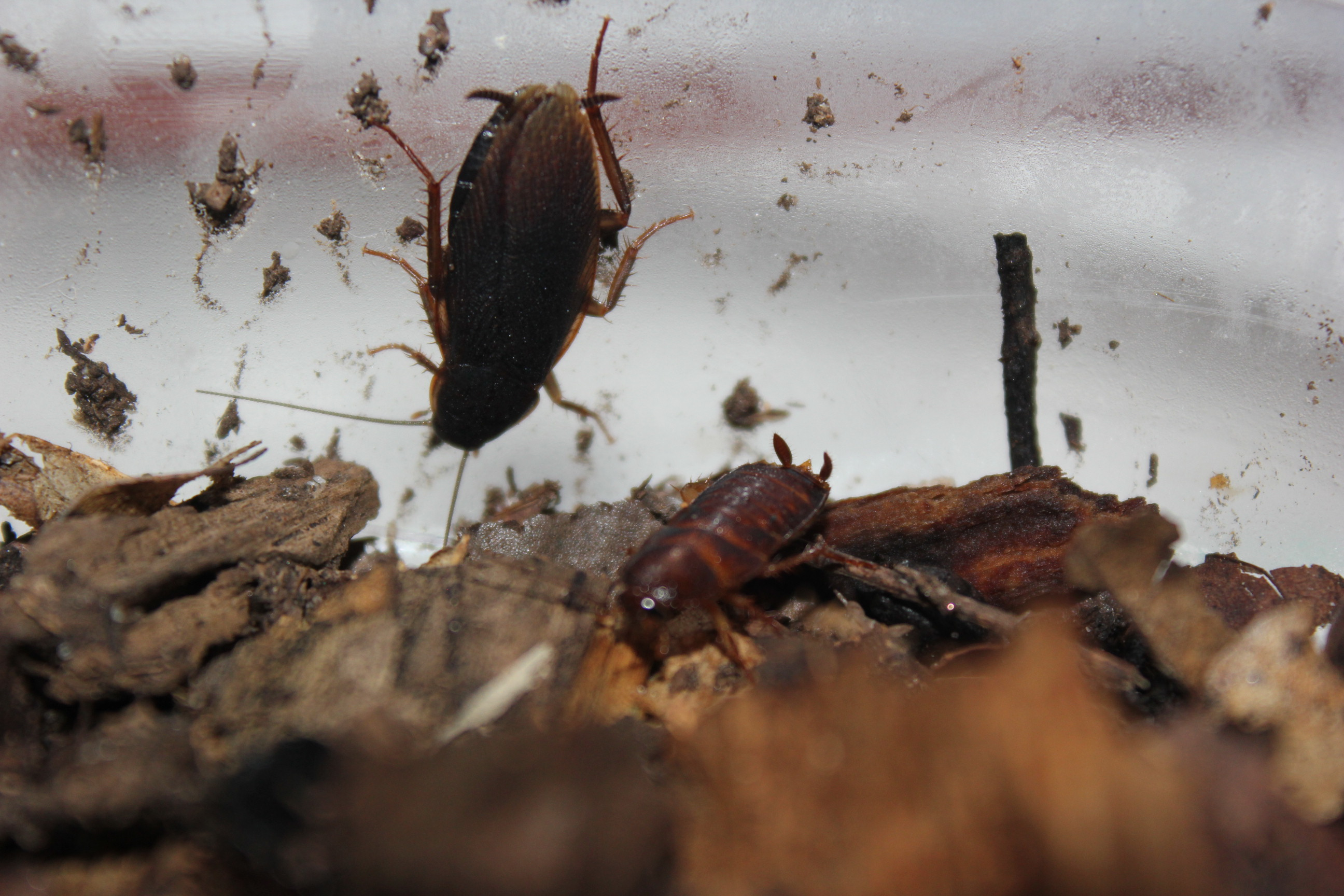
Adult and sub-adult female Kyoto roaches

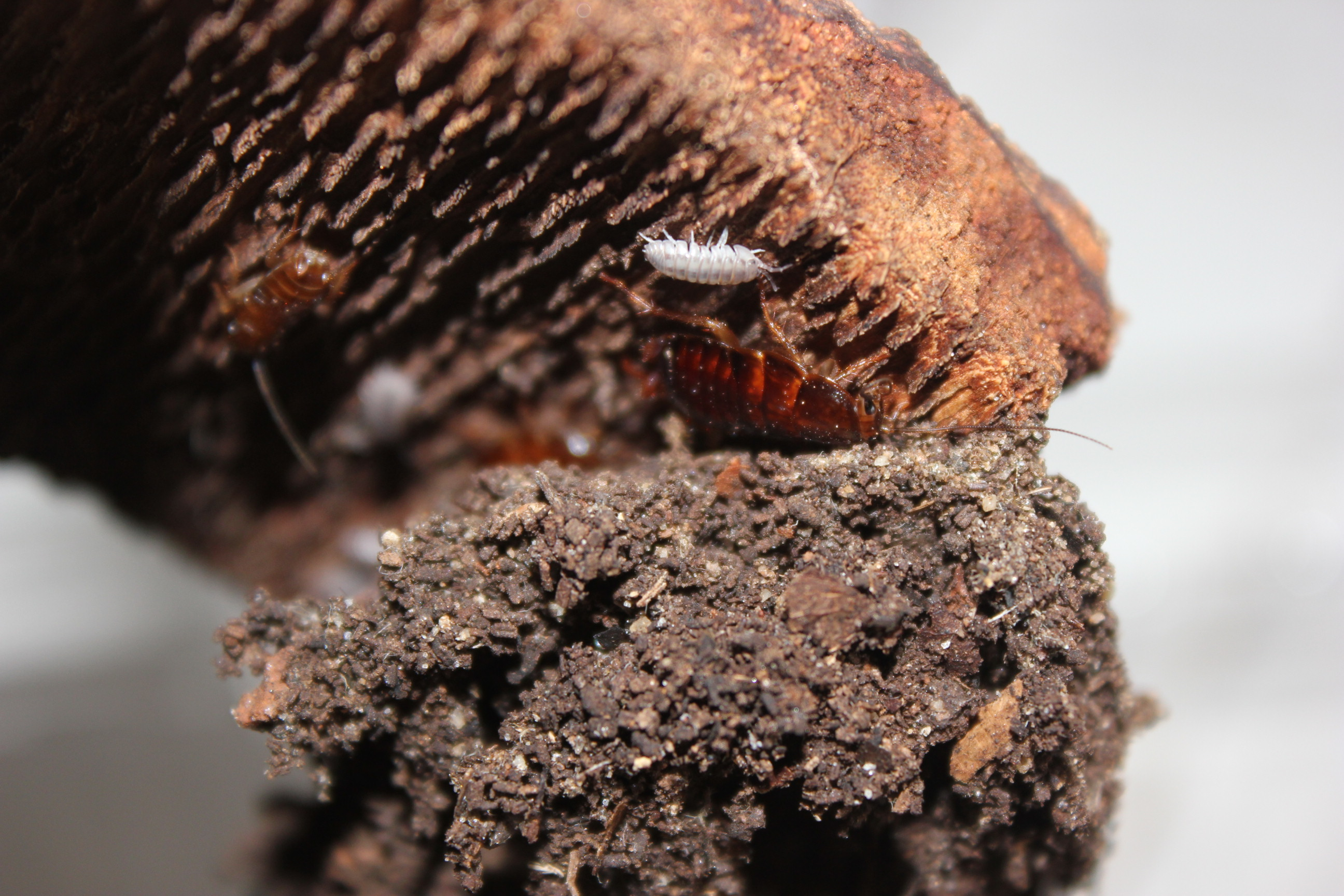
Nymphs

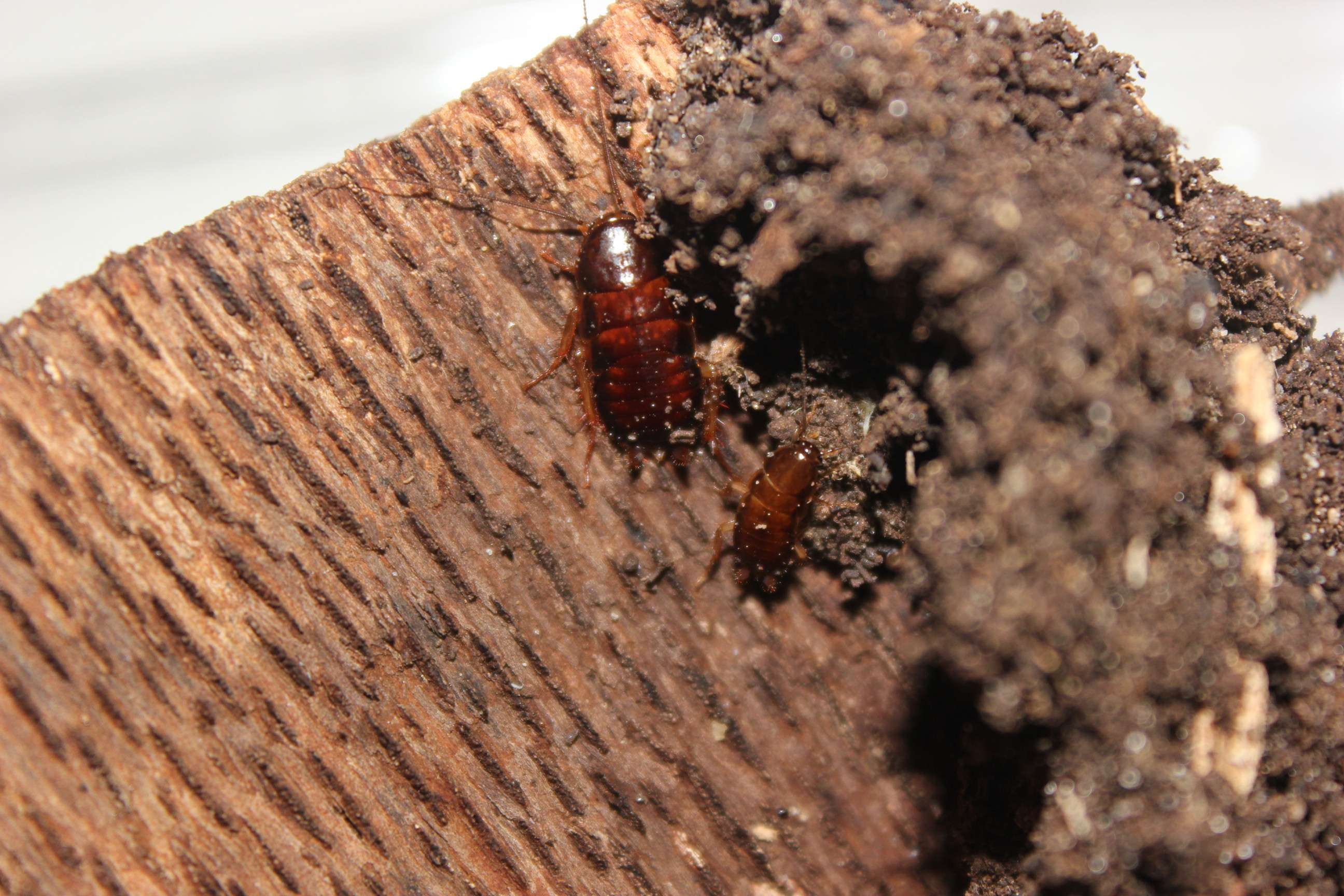
Nymphs

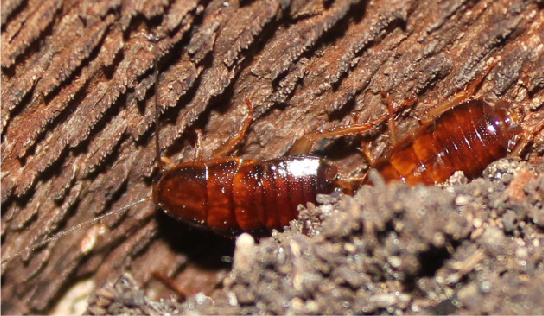
Nymphs

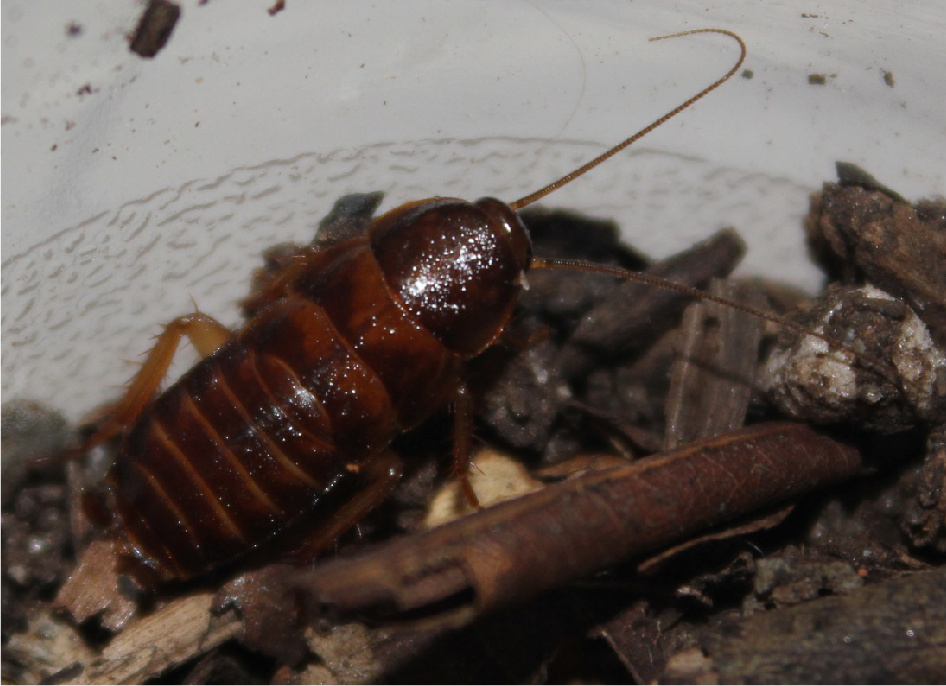
Sub-adult female
