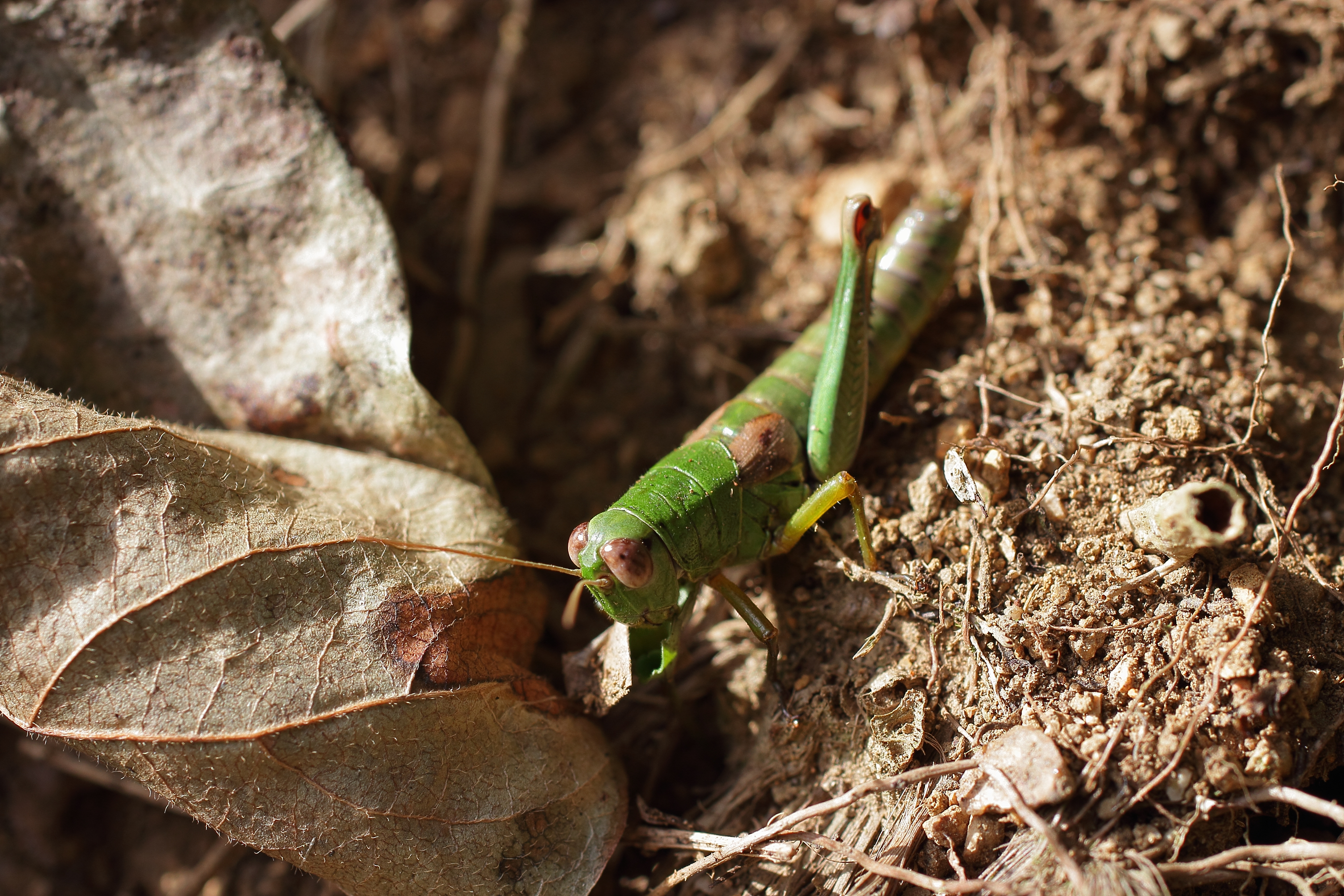

Scientific classification
- Kingdom: Animalia
- Phylum: Arthropoda
- Clade: Pancrustacea
- Class: Insecta
- Order: Orthoptera
- Suborder: Caelifera
- Family: Acrididae
- Subfamily: Melanoplinae
- Tribe: Podismini
- Subtribe: Tonkinacridina
- Genus: Parapodisma
- Species: P. setouchiensis

Binomial name
- Parapodisma setouchiensis Inoue, 1979

= Parapodisma setouchiensis =

Species of spur-throated grasshopper

Parapodisma setouchiensis is a species of spur-throated grasshopper in the family Acrididae. It is found in Japan and South Korea.

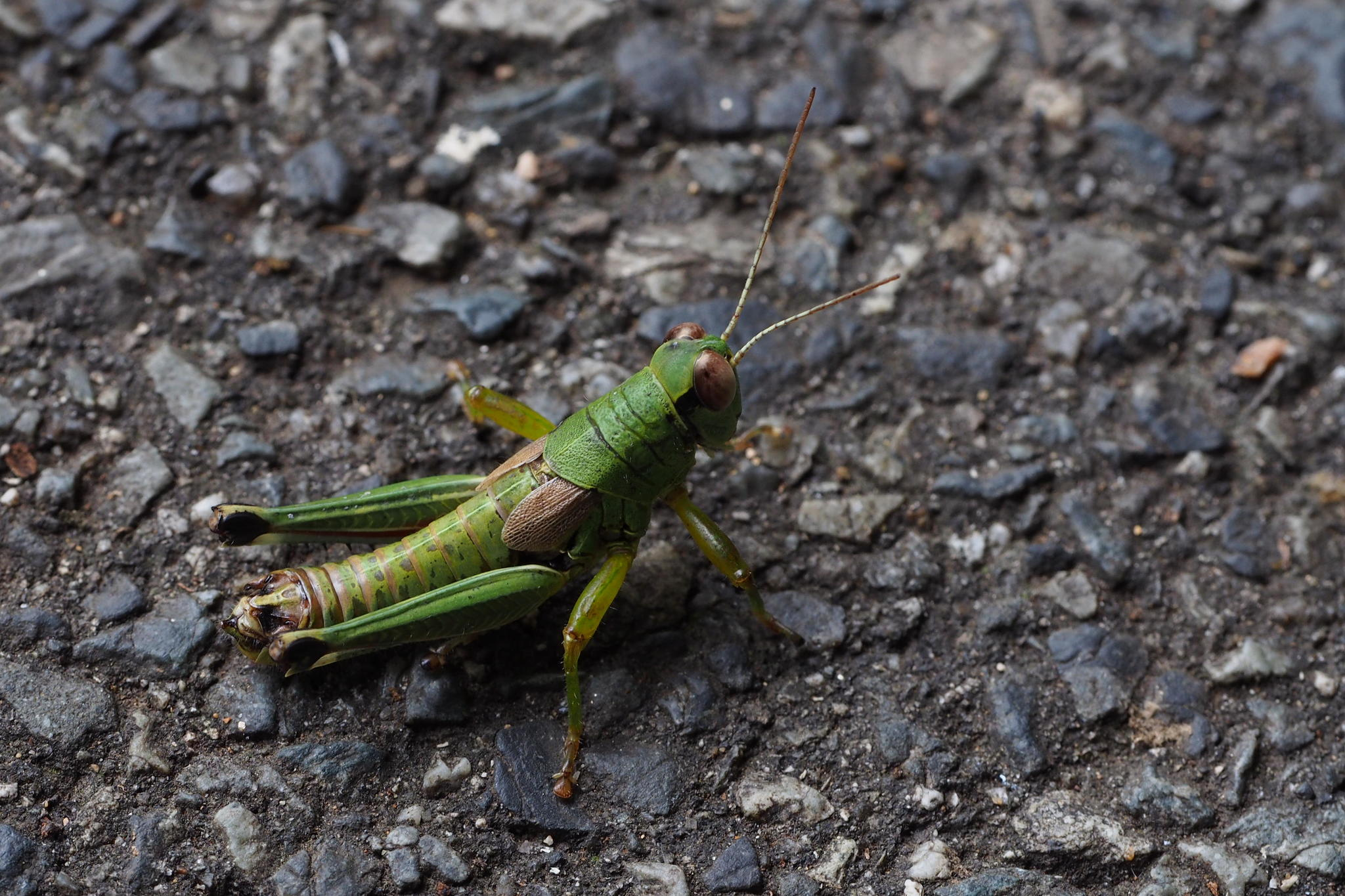
Parapodisma setouchiensis, Japan
