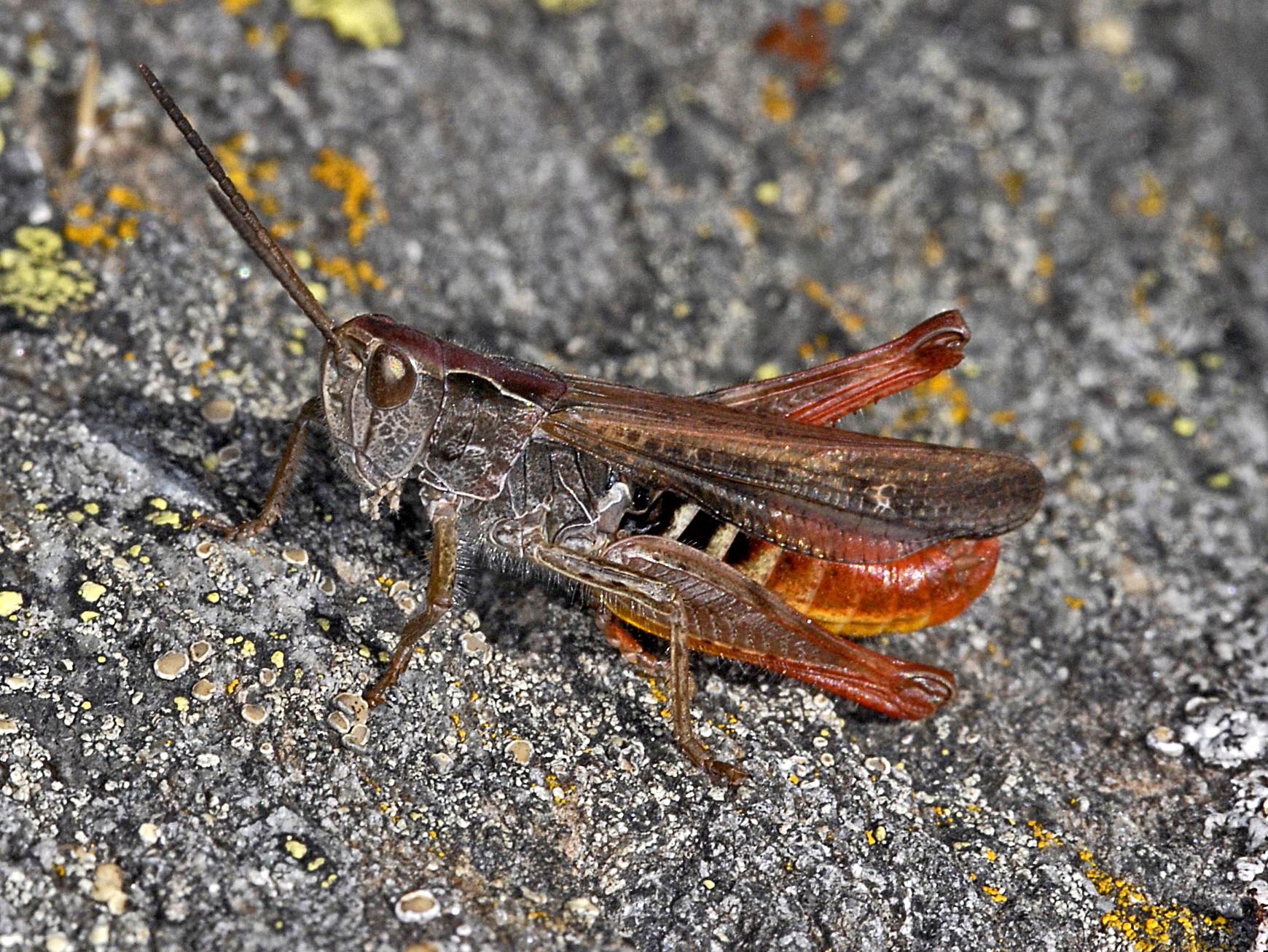
- Male
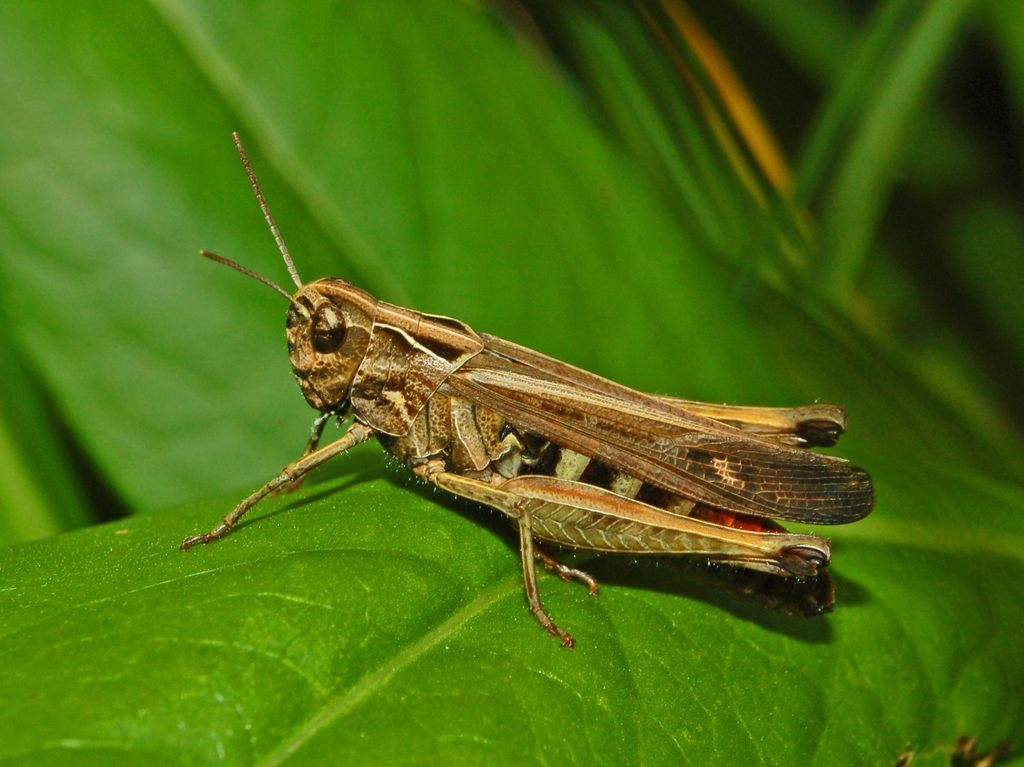
- Female

Scientific classification
- Kingdom: Animalia
- Phylum: Arthropoda
- Class: Insecta
- Order: Orthoptera
- Suborder: Caelifera
- Family: Acrididae
- Genus: Omocestus
- Species: O. rufipes

Binomial name
- Omocestus rufipes (Zetterstedt, 1821)

Synonyms
- List: Chorthippus zetterstedti Fieber, 1852; Acridium viridulum (Welmael, 1838); Gryllus rufipes Zetterstedt, 1821; Locusta miniata Stephens, 1835; Oedipoda cruentata Brullé, 1832

= Omocestus rufipes =

Species of grasshopper

Close-Up of a Omocestus rufipes

Omocestus rufipes, the woodland grasshopper, is a species of short-horned grasshopper belonging to subfamily Gomphocerinae. The Latin species name rufipes means red-footed, from rufus (red) + pes (foot), with reference to the color of the legs.

== Distribution and habitat ==
This species is present in most of Europe, in the eastern Palearctic realm, in North Africa, and in the Near East. In the British Isles this species is restricted to southern England (see map).

These grasshoppers inhabit meadows, grasslands and sunny clearings in woodlands.

== Description ==
The adult males of Omocestus rufipes grow up to 11–17 millimetres (0.43–0.67 in) long, while the females reach 13–22 millimetres (0.51–0.87 in) in length.

The basic coloration of the body varies from light brown to blackish. The dorsal side is usually beige in males, brown or green in females. Pronotum has a white edge. The hindwings are dark in their rear half in the male as in the female. In mature adults the underside of the apex of the abdomen is reddish or orange.

The apex of the maxillary palps is almost white. In males the tip of the abdomen is red. The males always show red rear tibias and often red rear femurs.

== Biology ==
They can be encountered from early June through late October. They mainly feed on grasses and various herbaceous plants.

Eggs are laid in clusters just below the surface of the soil or in the roots of plants. Nymphs appear in April or May.

== Gallery ==
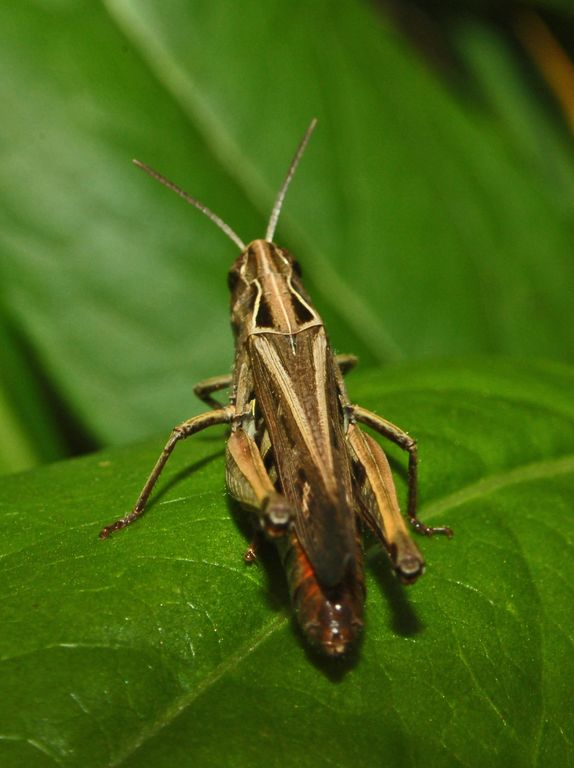
Dorsal view

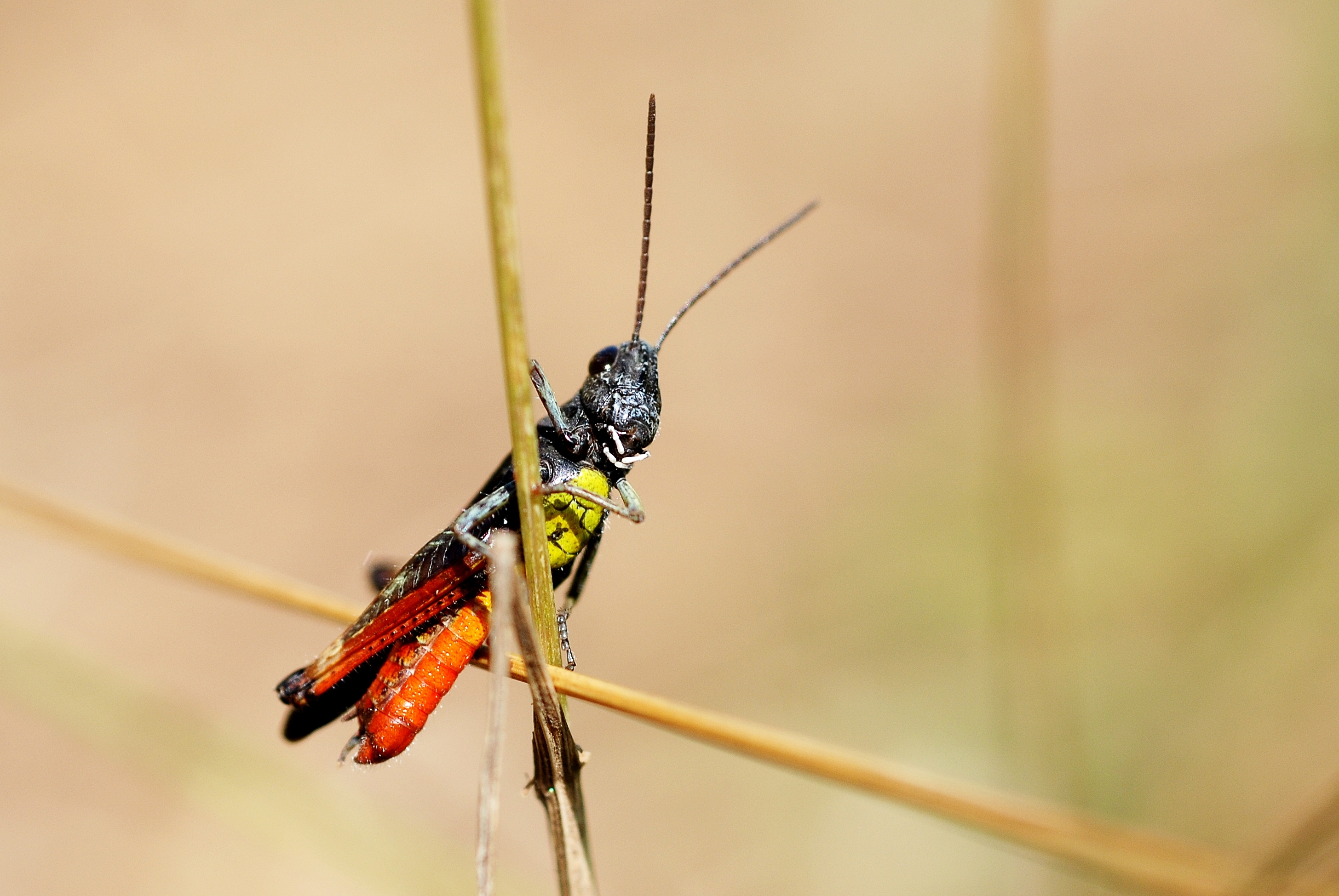
Ventral view

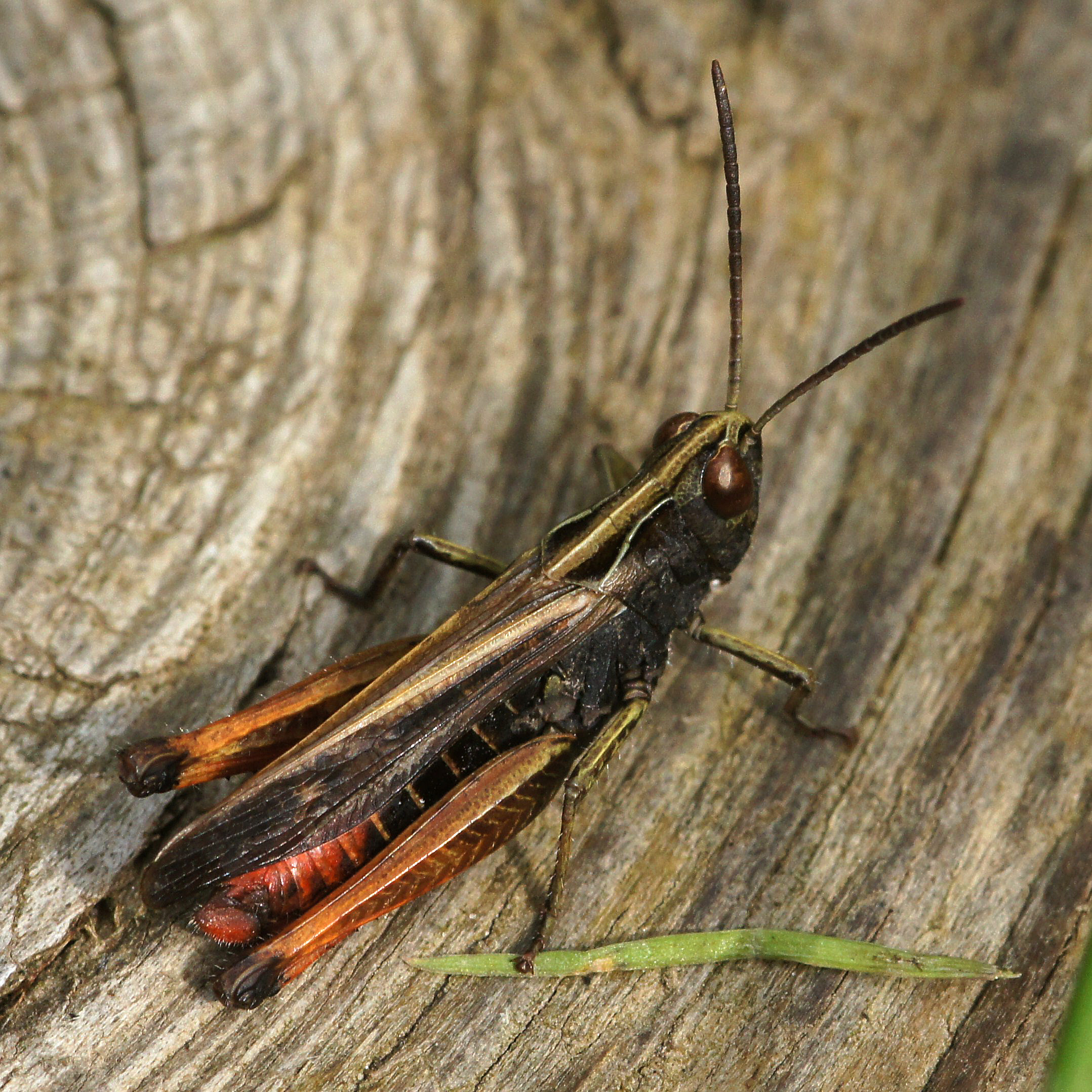
Male

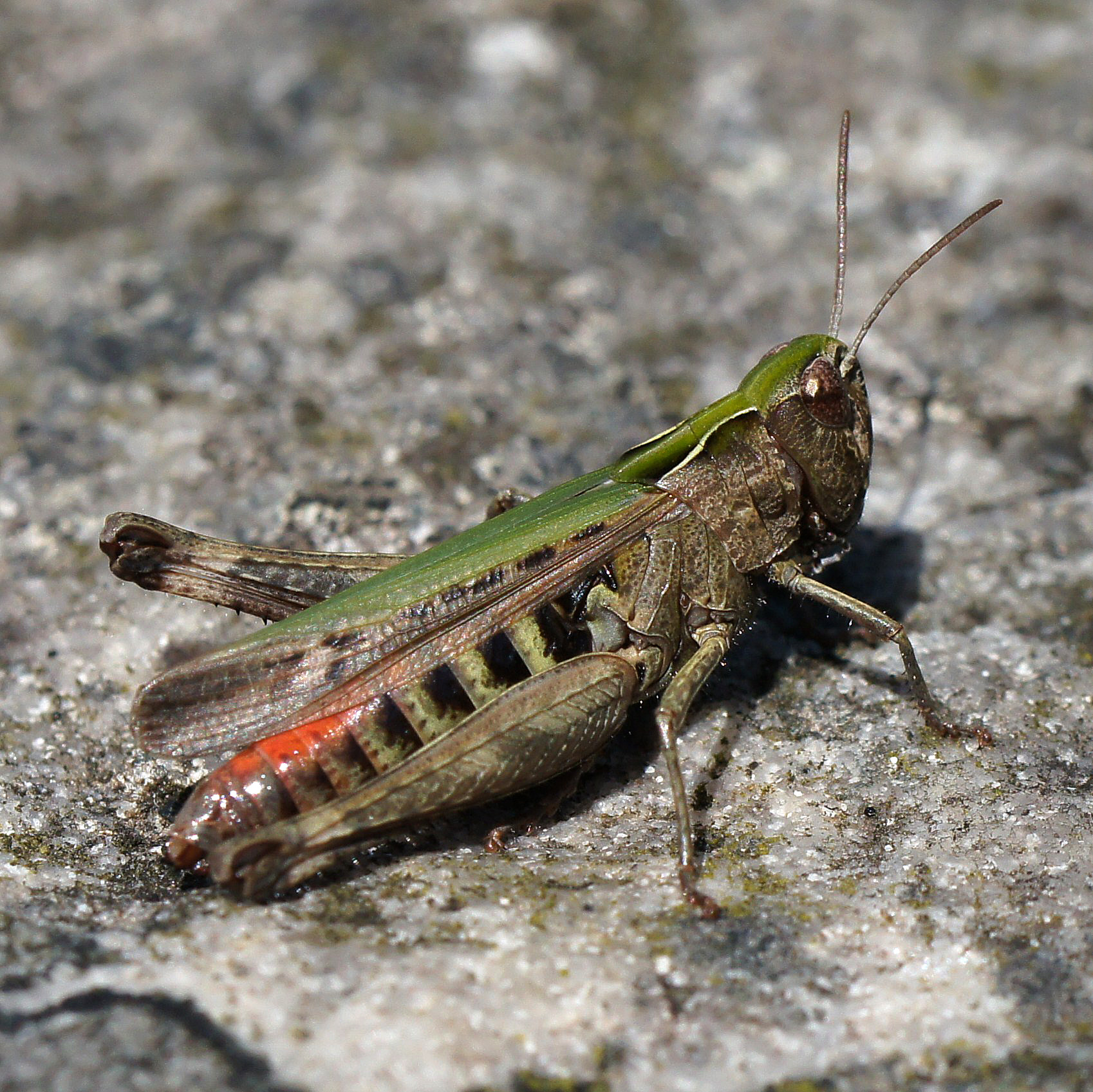
Female

Sound of Omocestus rufipes
Field recording in the Netherlands 29s
