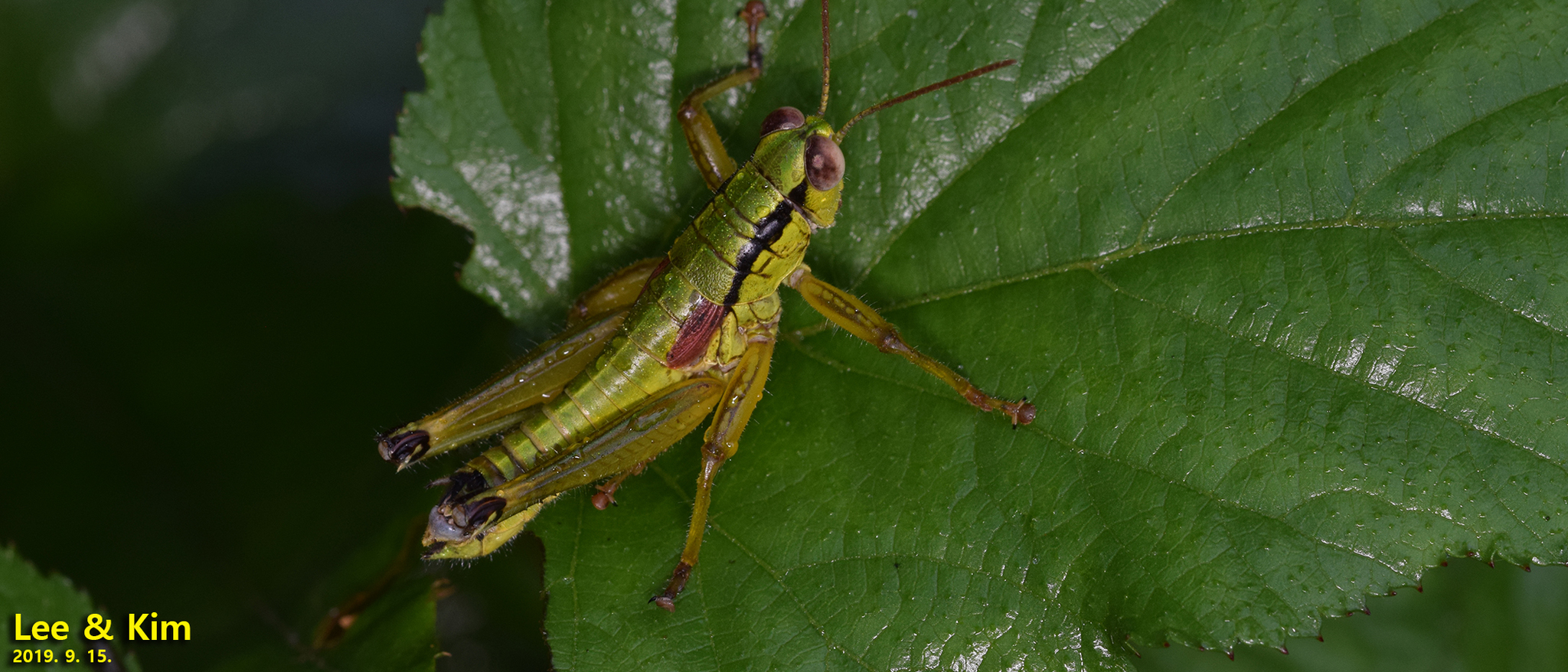
- Anapodisma miramae, South Korea

Scientific classification
- Kingdom: Animalia
- Phylum: Arthropoda
- Clade: Pancrustacea
- Class: Insecta
- Order: Orthoptera
- Suborder: Caelifera
- Family: Acrididae
- Subfamily: Melanoplinae
- Tribe: Podismini
- Subtribe: Miramellina
- Genus: Anapodisma
- Species: A. miramae

Binomial name
- Anapodisma miramae Dovnar-Zapolskij, 1932

= Anapodisma miramae =

Species of grasshopper

Anapodisma miramae is a species of spur-throated grasshopper in the family Acrididae. It is found in eastern Asia.
