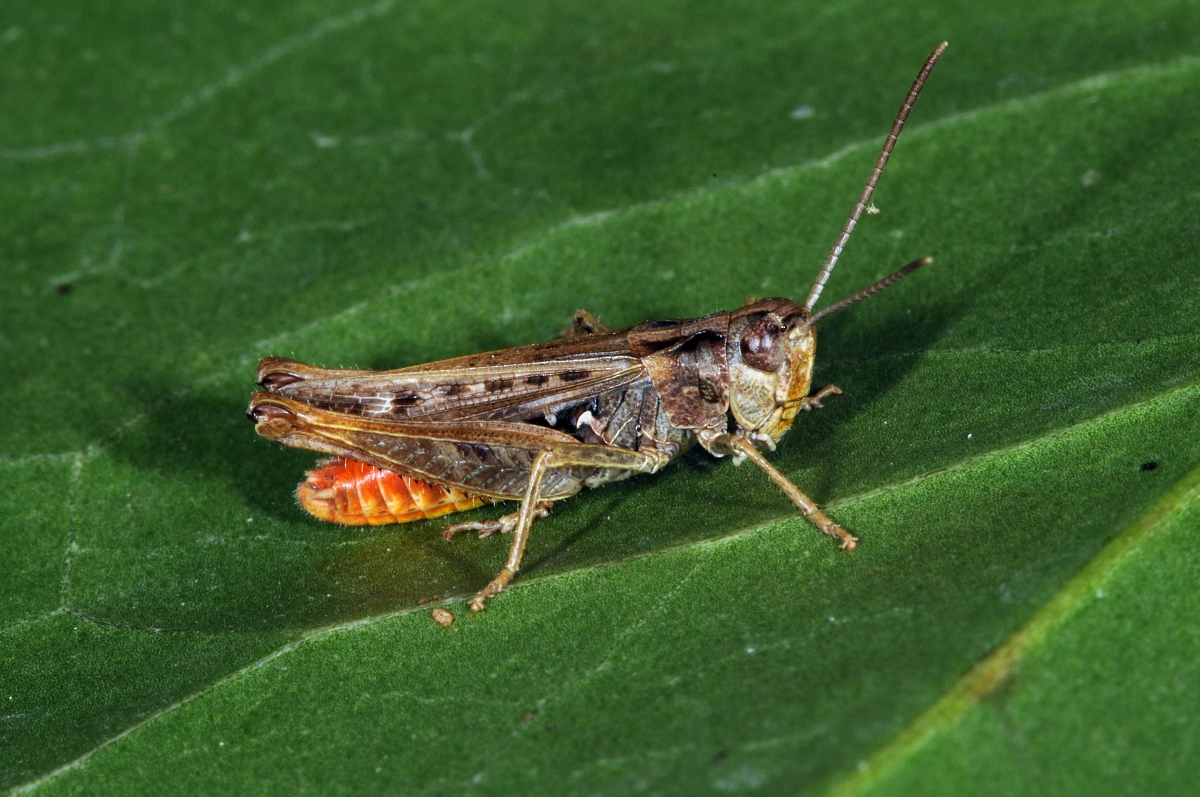
- Omocestus haemorrhoidalis male, Germany

Scientific classification
- Domain: Eukaryota
- Kingdom: Animalia
- Phylum: Arthropoda
- Class: Insecta
- Order: Orthoptera
- Suborder: Caelifera
- Family: Acrididae
- Genus: Omocestus
- Species: O. haemorrhoidalis

Binomial name
- Omocestus haemorrhoidalis (Charpentier, 1825)

= Omocestus haemorrhoidalis =

Species of grasshopper

Omocestus haemorrhoidalis is a species belonging to the family Acrididae subfamily Gomphocerinae. It is found across Europe. It inhabits low-vegetation, sandy to stony ground areas, also adjacent to grasslands

Close-Up of a Omocestus haemorrhoidalis
