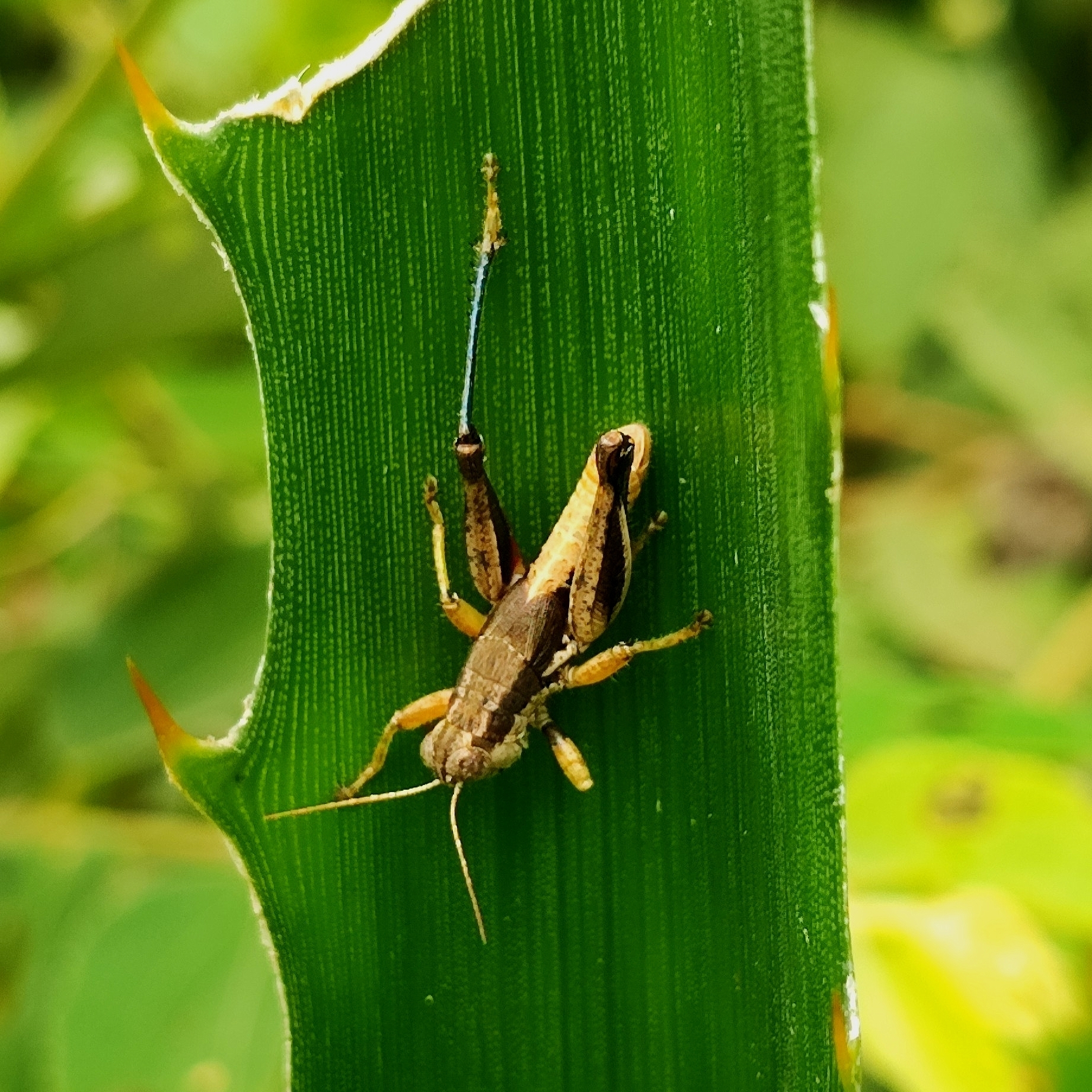
- Eurotettix monnei

Scientific classification
- Kingdom: Animalia
- Phylum: Arthropoda
- Class: Insecta
- Order: Orthoptera
- Suborder: Caelifera
- Family: Acrididae
- Subfamily: Melanoplinae
- Tribe: Dichroplini
- Genus: Eurotettix; Bruner 1906

= Eurotettix =

Genus of grasshoppers

Eurotettix is genus of grasshoppers in the family Acrididae. The distribution of Eurotettix species is limited to South America.

Species include:

- Eurotettix femoratus
- Eurotettix minor
- Eurotettix robustus
- Eurotettix schrottkyi
- Eurotettix lilloanus
- Eurotettix monnei
- Eurotettix carbonelli
- Eurotettix raphaelandrearum
- Eurotettix montanus
- Eurotettix concavus
- Eurotettix latus
- Eurotettix procerus
- Eurotettix brevicerci
- Eurotettix similraphael
- Eurotettix bugresensis
