= Eurotettix similraphael =

Scientific classification
- Domain: Eukaryota
- Kingdom: Animalia
- Phylum: Arthropoda
- Class: Insecta
- Order: Orthoptera
- Suborder: Caelifera
- Family: Acrididae
- Genus: Eurotettix
- Species: E. similraphael

Binomial name
- Eurotettix similraphael Cigliano, 2007

Species of grasshopper

Eurotettix similraphael is a grasshopper species in the family Acrididae. It was described by Maria Marta Cigliano in 2007. It is known only from the type locality in the state of Goias, Brazil.
