= Hypsalonia merga =

Scientific classification
- Kingdom: Animalia
- Phylum: Arthropoda
- Clade: Pancrustacea
- Class: Insecta
- Order: Orthoptera
- Suborder: Caelifera
- Family: Acrididae
- Tribe: Podismini
- Genus: Hypsalonia
- Species: H. merga

Binomial name
- Hypsalonia merga Gurney & Buxton, 1963

Species of grasshopper

Hypsalonia merga is a species of spur-throated grasshoppers in the family Acrididae. It is found in North America.
