= Hypsalonia tioga =

Scientific classification
- Kingdom: Animalia
- Phylum: Arthropoda
- Clade: Pancrustacea
- Class: Insecta
- Order: Orthoptera
- Suborder: Caelifera
- Family: Acrididae
- Tribe: Podismini
- Genus: Hypsalonia
- Species: H. tioga

Binomial name
- Hypsalonia tioga Gurney & Eades, 1961

Species of grasshopper

Hypsalonia tioga is a species of spur-throated grasshopper in the family Acrididae. It is found in North America.
