= Hypsalonia =

Scientific classification
- Kingdom: Animalia
- Phylum: Arthropoda
- Clade: Pancrustacea
- Class: Insecta
- Order: Orthoptera
- Suborder: Caelifera
- Family: Acrididae
- Tribe: Podismini
- Genus: Hypsalonia; Gurney & Eades, 1961

Genus of grasshoppers

Hypsalonia is a genus of spur-throated grasshoppers in the family Acrididae. There are at least 6 described species in Hypsalonia.

== Species ==
- Hypsalonia merga Gurney & Buxton, 1963
- Hypsalonia miwoki Gurney & Eades, 1961
- Hypsalonia petasata Gurney & Eades, 1961
- Hypsalonia rentzi Gurney & Eades, 1961
- Hypsalonia satur (Scudder, 1897)
- Hypsalonia tioga Gurney & Eades, 1961
