= Hypsalonia satur =

Scientific classification
- Kingdom: Animalia
- Phylum: Arthropoda
- Clade: Pancrustacea
- Class: Insecta
- Order: Orthoptera
- Suborder: Caelifera
- Family: Acrididae
- Tribe: Podismini
- Genus: Hypsalonia
- Species: H. satur

Binomial name
- Hypsalonia satur (Scudder, 1897)

Species of grasshopper

Hypsalonia satur is a species of spur-throated grasshopper in the family Acrididae. It is found in North America.
