= Buckellacris nuda =

Scientific classification
- Kingdom: Animalia
- Phylum: Arthropoda
- Clade: Pancrustacea
- Class: Insecta
- Order: Orthoptera
- Suborder: Caelifera
- Family: Acrididae
- Tribe: Podismini
- Genus: Buckellacris
- Species: B. nuda

Binomial name
- Buckellacris nuda (E. M. Walker, 1889)

Species of grasshopper

Buckellacris nuda, or Buckell's timberline grasshopper, is a species of spur-throated grasshopper in the family Acrididae. It is found in North America.

== Subspecies ==
These two subspecies belong to the species Buckellacris nuda:

- Buckellacris nuda nuda (E. M. Walker, 1889)^{i c g}
- Buckellacris nuda relicta Rehn and Rehn, 1945^{i c g}

Data sources: i = ITIS, c = Catalogue of Life, g = GBIF, b = Bugguide.net
