= Buckellacris =

Scientific classification
- Kingdom: Animalia
- Phylum: Arthropoda
- Clade: Pancrustacea
- Class: Insecta
- Order: Orthoptera
- Suborder: Caelifera
- Family: Acrididae
- Subfamily: Melanoplinae
- Tribe: Podismini
- Genus: Buckellacris; Rehn & Rehn, 1945

Genus of grasshoppers

Buckellacris is a genus of spur-throated grasshoppers in the family Acrididae. There are at least three described species in Buckellacris.

== Species ==
These three species belong to the genus Buckellacris:

- Buckellacris chilcotinae (Hebard, 1922)^{i c g b}
- Buckellacris hispida (Bruner, 1885)^{i c g}
- Buckellacris nuda (E. M. Walker, 1889)^{i c g b} (Buckell's timberline grasshopper)

Data sources: i = ITIS, c = Catalogue of Life, g = GBIF, b = Bugguide.net
