= Karokia =

Scientific classification
- Domain: Eukaryota
- Kingdom: Animalia
- Phylum: Arthropoda
- Class: Insecta
- Order: Orthoptera
- Suborder: Caelifera
- Family: Acrididae
- Subfamily: Melanoplinae
- Genus: Karokia; Rehn, 1964

Genus of grasshoppers

Karokia is a genus of spur-throated grasshoppers in the family Acrididae. There are at least 2 described species in Karokia.

== Species ==
- Karokia blanci (Rehn, 1964)
- Karokia memorialis Gurney & Buxton, 1968
