= Karokia memorialis =

Scientific classification
- Domain: Eukaryota
- Kingdom: Animalia
- Phylum: Arthropoda
- Class: Insecta
- Order: Orthoptera
- Suborder: Caelifera
- Family: Acrididae
- Genus: Karokia
- Species: K. memorialis

Binomial name
- Karokia memorialis Gurney & Buxton, 1968

Species of grasshopper

Karokia memorialis is a species of spur-throated grasshoppers in the family Acrididae. It is found in North America.
