= List of Acrididae genera =

Acrididae is a family of short-horned grasshoppers in the order Orthoptera. There are 29 subfamilies, more than 1,400 genera, and over 6,700 described species in Acrididae, according to Orthoptera Species File.

== Acrididae genera ==
Subfamily Acridinae MacLeay, 1821

Tribe Acridini MacLeay, 1821

Acrida Linnaeus, 1758
Caledia Bolívar, 1914
Calephorops Sjöstedt, 1920
Cryptobothrus Rehn, 1907
Froggattina Tillyard, 1926
Keshava Gupta & Chandra, 2017
Perala Sjöstedt, 1921
Rapsilla Sjöstedt, 1921
Schizobothrus Sjöstedt, 1921

Tribe Calephorini Johnston, 1956

Calephorus Fieber, 1853

Tribe Gymnobothrini Uvarov, 1953

Brachybothrus Popov, 2019
Chirista Karsch, 1893
Comacris Bolívar, 1890
Coryphosima Karsch, 1893
Guichardippus Dirsh, 1959
Gymnobothrus Bolívar, 1889
Hulstaertia Ramme, 1931
Keya Uvarov, 1941
Malcolmburria Uvarov, 1953
Oxybothrus Uvarov, 1953
Rastafaria Ramme, 1931
Roduniella Bolívar, 1914
Tenuihippus Willemse, 1994
Zacompsa Karsch, 1893

Tribe Hyalopterygini Brunner von Wattenwyl, 1893

Allotruxalis Rehn, 1944
Cocytotettix Rehn, 1906
Eutryxalis Bruner, 1900
Guaranacris Rehn, 1944
Hyalopteryx Charpentier, 1845
Metaleptea Brunner von Wattenwyl, 1893
Neorphula Donato, 2004
Orphula Stål, 1873
Parorphula Bruner, 1900
Paulacris Rehn, 1944

Tribe Pargaini Uvarov, 1953

Acteana Karsch, 1896
Machaeridia Stål, 1873
Odontomelus Bolívar, 1890
Parga Walker, 1870
Phryganomelus Jago, 1983

Tribe Phlaeobini Brunner von Wattenwyl, 1893

Genus Group Afrophlaeoba

Afrophlaeoba Jago, 1983
Brachyphlaeobella Jago, 1983
Chlorophlaeobella Jago, 1983
Chokwea Uvarov, 1953
Chromochokwea Jago, 1983
Paralobopoma Rehn, 1914
Parodontomelus Ramme, 1929
Platyverticula Jago, 1983

Genus Group Duronia

Duronia Stål, 1876
Duroniella Bolívar, 1908
Leopardia Baccetti, 1985
Oxyduronia Popov, 2019

Genus Group Ocnocerus

Anacteana Popov, 2019
Hyperocnocerus Uvarov, 1953
Ocnocerus Bolívar, 1889
Panzia Miller, 1929
Rhabdoplea Karsch, 1893
Sumba Bolívar, 1909

Cannula Bolívar, 1906
Chlorophlaeoba Ramme, 1941
Culmulus Uvarov, 1953
Glyphoclonus Karsch, 1896
Holopercna Karsch, 1891
Mesophlaeoba Kumar & Usmani, 2015
Oxyphlaeobella Ramme, 1941
Phlaeoba Stål, 1861
Phlaeobacris Willemse, 1932
Phlaeobella Ramme, 1941
Phlaeobida Bolívar, 1902
Pseudophlaeoba Bolívar, 1914
Pyrgophlaeoba Miller, 1929
Sikkimiana Uvarov, 1940
Sinophlaeoba Niu & Zheng, 2005
Sinophlaeobida Yin & Yin, 2007
Xerophlaeoba Uvarov, 1936

Tribe Truxalini Serville, 1838

Acridarachnea Bolívar, 1908
Chromotruxalis Dirsh, 1950
Oxytruxalis Dirsh, 1950
Truxalis Fabricius, 1775
Truxaloides Dirsh, 1950
Xenotruxalis Dirsh, 1950

Aeropedelloides Liu, 1981
Anaeolopus Uvarov, 1922
Bababuddinia Bolívar, 1917
Bambesiana Koçak & Kemal, 2008
Brachyacrida Dirsh, 1952
Calliphlaeoba Ramme, 1941
Capulica Bolívar, 1917
Carinacris Liu, 1984
Carliola Uvarov, 1939
Chromacrida Dirsh, 1952
Closteridea Scudder, 1893
Cohembia Uvarov, 1953
Conuacris Willemse, 1932
Covasacris Liebermann, 1970
Dorsthippus Donskoff, 1977
Duroniopsis Bolívar, 1914
Eoscyllina Rehn, 1909
Epacromiacris Willemse, 1933
Euprepoptera Uvarov, 1953
Euthynous Stål, 1877
Julea Bolívar, 1914
Kaloa Bolívar, 1909
Lemuracris Dirsh, 1966
Lobopoma Karsch, 1896
Luzonica Willemse, 1933
Megaphlaeoba Willemse, 1951
Neophlaeoba Usmani & Shafee, 1983
Nimbacris Popov & Fishpool, 1992
Nivisacris Liu, 1984
Orthochtha Karsch, 1891
Oxyolena Karsch, 1893
Oxyphlaeoba Ramme, 1941
Palawanacris Ramme, 1941
Pamacris Ramme, 1929
Paracoryphosima Descamps & Wintrebert, 1966
Paraduronia Bolívar, 1909
Paraphlaeoba Bolívar, 1902
Paraphlaeobida Willemse, 1951
Pasiphimus Bolívar, 1914
Perella Bolívar, 1914
Phlocerus Fischer von Waldheim, 1833
Phorinia Bolívar, 1914
Plagiacris Sjöstedt, 1931
Pseudoeoscyllina Liang & Jia, 1992
Pseudopargaella Descamps & Wintrebert, 1966
Pseudoptygonotus Zheng, 1977
Ruganotus Yin, 1979
Rugophlaeoba Willemse, 1951
Shabacris Popov & Fishpool, 1992
Sherifuria Uvarov, 1926
Urugalla Uvarov, 1927
Vietteacris Descamps & Wintrebert, 1966
Vitalisia Bolívar, 1914
Weenenia Miller, 1932
Wellawaya Uvarov, 1927
Xenocymochtha Popov & Fishpool, 1992
Xenoderus Uvarov, 1925
Yendia Ramme, 1929
Zambiacris Johnsen, 1983
Zygophlaeoba Bolívar, 1902

Subfamily Calliptaminae Jacobson, 1905

Acorypha Krauss, 1877
Bosumia Ramme, 1929
Brachyxenia Kirby, 1914
Calliptamus Serville, 1831
Damaracris Brown, 1972
Indomerus Dirsh, 1951
Palaciosa Bolívar, 1930
Paracaloptenus Bolívar, 1878
Peripolus Martínez y Fernández-Castillo, 1898
Sphodromerus Stål, 1873
Sphodronotus Uvarov, 1943
Stobbea Ramme, 1929

Subfamily Caryandinae Yin & Liu, 1987

Caryanda Stål, 1878
Cercina Stål, 1878
Lemba Huang, 1983

Subfamily Catantopinae Brunner von Wattenwyl, 1893

Tribe Allagini Johnston, 1956

Allaga Karsch, 1896
Sauracris Burr, 1900

Tribe Apoboleini Johnston, 1956

Apoboleus Karsch, 1891
Pseudophialosphera Dirsh, 1952
Squamobibracte Ingrisch, 1989

Tribe Catantopini Brunner von Wattenwyl, 1893

Subtribe Apotropina Key, 1993

Apotropis Bolívar, 1906
Azelota Brunner von Wattenwyl, 1893
Burcatelia Sjöstedt, 1930
Clepsydria Sjöstedt, 1920
Epallia Sjöstedt, 1921
Fipurga Sjöstedt, 1921
Goniaeoidea Sjöstedt, 1920
Percassa Sjöstedt, 1921
Perunga Sjöstedt, 1921
Schayera Key, 1990

Subtribe Aretzina Key, 1993

Aretza Sjöstedt, 1921
Brachyexarna Sjöstedt, 1921
Exarna Brunner von Wattenwyl, 1893
Macrocara Uvarov, 1930
Terpillaria Sjöstedt, 1920
Zebratula Sjöstedt, 1920

Subtribe Buforaniina Key, 1993

Buforania Sjöstedt, 1920
Cuparessa Sjöstedt, 1921
Phanerocerus Saussure, 1888
Raniliella Sjöstedt, 1921
Tapesta Sjöstedt, 1921

Subtribe Catantopina Brunner von Wattenwyl, 1893

Catantops Schaum, 1853
Catantopsilus Ramme, 1929
Catantopsis Bolívar, 1912
Diabolocatantops Jago, 1984
Nisiocatantops Dirsh, 1953
Stenocatantops Dirsh, 1953

Subtribe Cirphulina Key, 1993

Chirotepica Sjöstedt, 1936
Cirphula Stål, 1873
Macrolopholia Sjöstedt, 1920

Subtribe Coryphistina Mistshenko, 1952

Adreppus Sjöstedt, 1921
Beplessia Sjöstedt, 1921
Camelophistes Key, 1994
Charpentierella Key, 1994
Coryphistes Charpentier, 1845
Euophistes Sjöstedt, 1920
Macrolobalia Sjöstedt, 1921
Relatta Sjöstedt, 1921
Spectrophistes Key, 1994

Subtribe Cratilopina Key, 1993

Caperrala Sjöstedt, 1921
Cratilopus Bolívar, 1906
Exarhalltia Sjöstedt, 1930
Typaya Sjöstedt, 1921

Subtribe Ecphantina Key, 1993

Alectorolophellus Ramme, 1941
Alectorolophus Brunner von Wattenwyl, 1898
Althaemenes Stål, 1878
Ecphantus Stål, 1878
Happarana Sjöstedt, 1920
Lyrolophus Ramme, 1941
Mengkokacris Ramme, 1941
Paralectorolophus Ramme, 1941
Sulawesiana Koçak & Kemal, 2008

Subtribe Eumecistina Key, 1993

Asoramea Sjöstedt, 1921
Cervidia Stål, 1878
Erythropomala Sjöstedt, 1920
Eumecistes Brancsik, 1895
Euomopalon Sjöstedt, 1920
Genurellia Sjöstedt, 1931
Microphistes Sjöstedt, 1920
Pardillana Sjöstedt, 1920
Pespulia Sjöstedt, 1921
Retuspia Sjöstedt, 1921

Subtribe Goniaeina Key, 1993

Goniaea Stål, 1873

Subtribe Hepalicina Key, 1993

Hepalicus Sjöstedt, 1921

Subtribe Loiteriina Key, 1993

Loiteria Sjöstedt, 1921

Subtribe Maclystriina Key, 1993

Maclystria Sjöstedt, 1921
Perloccia Sjöstedt, 1936

Subtribe Macrazelotina Key, 1993

Macrazelota Sjöstedt, 1921
Rusurplia Sjöstedt, 1930

Subtribe Macrotonina Key, 1993

Macrotona Brunner von Wattenwyl, 1893
Theomolpus Bolívar, 1918
Xypechtia Sjöstedt, 1921

Subtribe Micreolina Key, 1993

Micreola Sjöstedt, 1920
Sjoestedtacris Baehr, 1992
Sumbilvia Sjöstedt, 1921

Subtribe Peakesiina Key, 1993

Caloptilla Sjöstedt, 1921
Catespa Sjöstedt, 1921
Cedarinia Sjöstedt, 1920
Cuprascula Sjöstedt, 1921
Curpilladia Sjöstedt, 1934
Desertaria Sjöstedt, 1920
Lagoonia Sjöstedt, 1931
Peakesia Sjöstedt, 1920
Perelytrana Sjöstedt, 1936
Testudinellia Sjöstedt, 1930
Xanterriaria Sjöstedt, 1934
Yrrhapta Sjöstedt, 1921
Zabrala Sjöstedt, 1921

Subtribe Perbelliina Key, 1993

Ablectia Sjöstedt, 1921
Capraxa Sjöstedt, 1920
Minyacris Key, 1992
Perbellia Sjöstedt, 1920
Phaulacridium Brunner von Wattenwyl, 1893
Porraxia Sjöstedt, 1921
Rectitropis Sjöstedt, 1936

Subtribe Russalpiina Key, 1993

Russalpia Sjöstedt, 1921
Sigaus Hutton, 1898
Tasmanalpina Key, 1991
Tasmaniacris Sjöstedt, 1932
Truganinia Key, 1991

Subtribe Stropina Brunner von Wattenwyl, 1893

Adlappa Sjöstedt, 1920
Collitera Sjöstedt, 1921
Parazelum Sjöstedt, 1921
Stropis Stål, 1873

Subtribe Urnisina Key, 1993

Rhitzala Sjöstedt, 1921
Urnisa Stål, 1861

Dimeracris Niu & Zheng, 1993
Phaeocatantops Dirsh, 1953
Stenocrobylus Gerstaecker, 1869
Trichocatantops Uvarov, 1953
Xenocatantops Dirsh, 1953

Tribe Diexiini Mistshenko, 1945

Bufonacridella Adelung, 1910
Diexis Zubovski, 1899

Tribe Gereniini Brunner von Wattenwyl, 1893

Anacranae Miller, 1934
Anasedulia Dawwrueng, Storozhenko & Asanok, 2015
Bibractella Storozhenko, 2002
Gerenia Stål, 1878
Leosedulia Storozhenko, 2009

Tribe Histrioacridini Key, 1993

Subtribe Histrioacridina Key, 1993

Histrioacrida Sjöstedt, 1930

Subtribe Scurrina Key, 1993

Scurra Key, 1992

Tribe Kakaduacridini Key, 1993

Kakaduacris Key, 1992

Tribe Merehanini Baccetti, 1984

Merehana Kevan, 1957

Tribe Mesambriini Brunner von Wattenwyl, 1893

Celebesia Bolívar, 1917
Mesambria Stål, 1878
Pseudotraulia Laosinchai & Jago, 1980
Pyrgophistes Key, 1992
Ranacris You & Lin, 1983
Traulia Stål, 1873

Tribe Oxyrrhepini Tinkham, 1940

Oxyrrhepes Stål, 1873

Tribe Paraconophymatini Otte, 1995

Paraconophyma Uvarov, 1921

Tribe Tauchirini Tinkham, 1940

Chapacris Tinkham, 1940
Tauchira Stål, 1878
Toacris Tinkham, 1940

Tribe Urnisiellini Key, 1993

Urnisiella Sjöstedt, 1930

Tribe Uvaroviini Mistshenko, 1952

Uvarovium Dirsh, 1927

Tribe Wiltshirellini Shumakov, 1963

Wiltshirella Popov, 1951

Tribe Xenacanthippini Tinkham, 1940

Xenacanthippus Miller, 1934

Genus Group Serpusiae Johnston, 1956

Aresceutica Karsch, 1896
Auloserpusia Rehn, 1914
Coenona Karsch, 1896
Pteropera Karsch, 1891
Segellia Karsch, 1891
Serpusia Karsch, 1891
Serpusilla Ramme, 1931

Abisares Stål, 1878
Allotriusia Karsch, 1896
Alpinacris Bigelow, 1967
Alulacris Zheng, 1981
Alulacroides Zheng, Dong & Xu, 2010
Ambrea Dirsh, 1962
Amismizia Bolívar, 1914
Anapropacris Uvarov, 1953
Angolacris Dirsh, 1962
Anischnansis Dirsh, 1959
Anomalocatantops Jago, 1984
Anthermus Stål, 1878
Antita Bolívar, 1908
Apalacris Walker, 1870
Apalniacris Ingrisch, Willemse & Shishodia, 2004
Arminda Krauss, 1892
Assamacris Uvarov, 1942
Bacuita Strand, 1932
Bambusacris Henry, 1933
Bannacris Zheng, 1980
Barombia Karsch, 1891
Beybienkoacris Storozhenko, 2005
Bhutanacridella Willemse, 1962
Bibracte Stål, 1878
Binaluacris Willemse, 1932
Brachaspis Hutton, 1898
Brachycatantops Dirsh, 1953
Brachyelytracris Baehr, 1992
Brownacris Dirsh, 1958
Bumacris Willemse, 1931
Burmacris Uvarov, 1942
Burttia Dirsh, 1951
Calderonia Bolívar, 1908
Callicatantops Uvarov, 1953
Cardeniopsis Dirsh, 1955
Cardenius Bolívar, 1911
Carsula Stål, 1878
Caryandoides Zheng & Xie, 2007
Carydana Bolívar, 1918
Cerechta Bolívar, 1922
Choroedocus Bolívar, 1914
Chromophialosphera Descamps & Donskoff, 1968
Cingalia Ramme, 1941
Circocephalus Willemse, 1928
Coloracris Willemse, 1938
Coniocara Henry, 1940
Criotocatantops Jago, 1984
Crobylostenus Ramme, 1929
Cryptocatantops Jago, 1984
Cylindracris Descamps & Wintrebert, 1967
Deliacris Ramme, 1941
Dendrocatantops Descamps & Wintrebert, 1966
Descampsilla Wintrebert, 1972
Digrammacris Jago, 1984
Dioscoridus Popov, 1957
Dirshilla Wintrebert, 1972
Dubitacris Henry, 1937
Duplessisia Dirsh, 1956
Duviardia Donskoff, 1985
Eliya Uvarov, 1927
Enoplotettix Bolívar, 1913
Epacrocatantops Jago, 1984
Eritrichius Bolívar, 1898
Eubocoana Sjöstedt, 1931
Eupreponotus Uvarov, 1921
Eupropacris Walker, 1870
Exopropacris Dirsh, 1951
Fer Bolívar, 1918
Frontifissia Key, 1937
Gemeneta Karsch, 1892
Genimenoides Henry, 1934
Gerunda Bolívar, 1918
Guineacris Ramme, 1941
Hadrolecocatantops Jago, 1984
Harantacris Wintrebert, 1972
Harpezocatantops Jago, 1984
Hebridea Willemse, 1926
Heinrichius Ramme, 1941
Ikonnikovia Bey-Bienko, 1935
Indomesambria Ingrisch, 2006
Ischnansis Karsch, 1896
Ixalidium Gerstaecker, 1869
Javanacris Willemse, 1955
Kinangopa Uvarov, 1938
Kwidschwia Rehn, 1914
Lefroya Kirby, 1914
Longchuanacris Zheng & Fu, 1989
Maculacris Willemse, 1932
Madimbania Dirsh, 1953
Maga Bolívar, 1918
Magaella Willemse, 1974
Malua Ramme, 1941
Mananara Dirsh, 1962
Mayottea Rehn, 1959
Mazaea Stål, 1876
Melicodes Uvarov, 1923
Melinocatantops Jago, 1984
Meltripata Bolívar, 1923
Micronacris Willemse, 1957
Milleriana Willemse, 1957
Moessonia Willemse, 1922
Molucola Bolívar, 1915
Mopla Henry, 1940
Naraikadua Henry, 1940
Nathanacris Willemse & Ingrisch, 2004
Navasia Kirby, 1914
Noliba Bolívar, 1922
Oenocatantops Dirsh, 1953
Opharicus Uvarov, 1940
Orthocephalum Willemse, 1921
Oshwea Ramme, 1929
Oxycardenius Uvarov, 1953
Oxycatantops Dirsh, 1953
Pachycatantops Dirsh, 1953
Pagdenia Miller, 1934
Palniacris Henry, 1940
Paprides Hutton, 1898
Paracardenius Bolívar, 1912
Paracaryanda Willemse, 1955
Parahysiella Wintrebert, 1972
Paramesambria Willemse, 1957
Paraperineta Descamps & Wintrebert, 1967
Parapropacris Ramme, 1929
Paraserpusilla Dirsh, 1962
Parastenocrobylus Willemse, 1921
Paratoacris Li & Jin, 1984
Paraxenotettix Dirsh, 1961
Pareuthymia Willemse, 1930
Peitharchicus Brunner von Wattenwyl, 1898
Pelecinotus Bolívar, 1902
Perakia Ramme, 1929
Perineta Dirsh, 1962
Pezocatantops Dirsh, 1953
Platycatantops Baccetti, 1985
Platycercacris Zheng & Shi, 2001
Pododula Karsch, 1896
Pseudofinotina Dirsh, 1962
Pseudogerunda Bey-Bienko, 1935
Pseudohysiella Dirsh, 1962
Pteroperina Ramme, 1929
Pyramisternum Huang, 1983
Racilia Stål, 1878
Racilidea Bolívar, 1918
Rugulacris Zheng & Wei, 2007
Salinacris Willemse, 1957
Sedulia Stål, 1878
Serpusiacris Descamps & Wintrebert, 1967
Serpusiformia Dirsh, 1966
Seyrigacris Bolívar, 1932
Shennongipodisma Zhong & Zheng, 2004
Siamacris Willemse, 1955
Siebersia Willemse, 1933
Sinopodismoides Gong, Zheng & Lian, 1995
Sphaerocranae Willemse, 1972
Staurocleis Uvarov, 1923
Striatosedulia Ingrisch, 1989
Strombocardeniopsis Jago, 1984
Sygrus Bolívar, 1889
Tangana Ramme, 1929
Tarbaleus Brunner von Wattenwyl, 1898
Tauchiridea Bolívar, 1918
Thymiacris Willemse, 1937
Tinnevellia Henry, 1940
Tonkinacrisoides Zheng & Wei, 2007
Traulacris Willemse, 1933
Triodicolacris Baehr, 1992
Tuberofera Willemse, 1930
Tunstallops Jago, 1984
Utanacris Miller, 1934
Uvarovacris Rehn, 1944
Veseyacris Dirsh, 1959
Visayia Rehn, 1944
Vitticatantops Sjöstedt, 1931
Vohemara Dirsh, 1966
Xenotettix Uvarov, 1925
Zeylanacris Rehn, 1944

Subfamily Copiocerinae Brunner von Wattenwyl, 1893

Tribe Aleuasini Brunner von Wattenwyl, 1893

Aleuas Stål, 1878
Zygoclistron Rehn, 1905

Tribe Clematodini Rehn & Eades, 1961

Apoxitettix Descamps, 1984
Bucephalacris Giglio-Tos, 1894
Clematodes Scudder, 1900
Dellia Stål, 1878

Tribe Copiocerini Brunner von Wattenwyl, 1893

Genus Group Hippacrae Rehn & Rehn, 1944

Cyphacris Gerstaecker, 1889
Hippacris Scudder, 1875

Adimantus Stål, 1878
Antiphon Stål, 1878
Caenacris Amédégnato & Descamps, 1979
Chlorohippus Bruner, 1911
Contacris Amédégnato & Descamps, 1979
Copiocera Burmeister, 1838
Copiocerina Descamps, 1978
Copiotettix Descamps, 1984
Episcopotettix Rehn, 1903
Eumecacris Descamps & Amédégnato, 1972
Monachidium Serville, 1831
Oncolopha Stål, 1873
Opshomala Serville, 1831
Sinop Descamps, 1984

Subfamily Coptacrinae Brunner von Wattenwyl, 1893

Bocagella Bolívar, 1889
Coptacra Stål, 1873
Coptacrella Bolívar, 1902
Coptacridia Ramme, 1941
Cyphocerastis Karsch, 1891
Ecphanthacris Tinkham, 1940
Ecphymacris Bi, 1984
Epistaurus Bolívar, 1889
Eucoptacra Bolívar, 1902
Eustaurus Mahmood & Yousuf, 2000
Exochoderes Bolívar, 1882
Hintzia Ramme, 1929
Pamphagella Bruner, 1910
Paracoptacra Karsch, 1896
Parepistaurus Karsch, 1896
Physocrobylus Dirsh, 1951
Pirithoicus Uvarov, 1940
Poecilocerastis Ramme, 1929
Rhopaloceracris Tinkham, 1940
Ruwenzoracris Rehn, 1914

Subfamily Cyrtacanthacridinae Kirby, 1910

Tribe Cyrtacanthacridini Kirby, 1910

Anacridium Uvarov, 1923
Chondracris Uvarov, 1923
Cyrtacanthacris Walker, 1870
Nomadacris Uvarov, 1923
Orthacanthacris Karsch, 1896
Patanga Uvarov, 1923
Rhadinacris Uvarov, 1923
Schistocerca Stål, 1873
Valanga Uvarov, 1923
Willemsea Uvarov, 1923
†Proschistocerca Zeuner, 1937

Acanthacris Uvarov, 1923
Acridoderes Bolívar, 1889
Adramita Uvarov, 1936
Armatacris Yin, 1979
Austracris Uvarov, 1923
Bryophyma Uvarov, 1923
Caledonula Uvarov, 1939
Callichloracris Ramme, 1931
Congoa Bolívar, 1911
Cristacridium Willemse, 1932
Finotina Uvarov, 1923
Gowdeya Uvarov, 1923
Halmenus Scudder, 1893
Kinkalidia Sjöstedt, 1931
Kraussaria Uvarov, 1923
Mabacris Donskoff, 1986
Nichelius Bolívar, 1888
Ootua Uvarov, 1927
Ordinacris Dirsh, 1966
Ornithacris Uvarov, 1924
Pachyacris Uvarov, 1923
Pachynotacris Uvarov, 1923
Parakinkalidia Donskoff, 1986
Parapachyacris Yin & Yin, 2008
Rhytidacris Uvarov, 1923
Ritchiella Mungai, 1992
Taiacris Donskoff, 1986

Subfamily Egnatiinae Bey-Bienko & Mistshenko, 1951

Tribe Egnatiini Bey-Bienko & Mistshenko, 1951

Bienkonia Dirsh, 1970
Charora Saussure, 1888
Egnatiella Bolívar, 1914
Egnatioides Vosseler, 1902
Egnatius Stål, 1876
Ferganacris Sergeev & Bugrov, 1988
Paracharora Fishelson, 1993
Paregnatius Uvarov, 1933

Leptoscirtus Saussure, 1888

Subfamily Eremogryllinae Dirsh, 1956

Eremogryllus Krauss, 1902
Notopleura Krauss, 1902

Subfamily Euryphyminae Dirsh, 1956

Acoryphella Giglio-Tos, 1907
Acrophymus Uvarov, 1922
Amblyphymus Uvarov, 1922
Anabibia Dirsh, 1956
Aneuryphymus Uvarov, 1922
Brachyphymus Uvarov, 1922
Calliptamicus Uvarov, 1922
Calliptamuloides Dirsh, 1956
Calliptamulus Uvarov, 1922
Catantopoides Johnsen, 1990
Euryphymus Stål, 1873
Kevanacris Dirsh, 1961
Pachyphymus Uvarov, 1922
Phymeurus Giglio-Tos, 1907
Platacanthoides Kirby, 1910
Plegmapteroides Dirsh, 1959
Plegmapteropsis Dirsh, 1956
Plegmapterus Martínez y Fernández-Castillo, 1898
Rhachitopis Uvarov, 1922
Rhachitopoides Naskrecki, 1995
Rhodesiana Dirsh, 1959
Somaliacris Dirsh, 1959
Surudia Uvarov, 1930

Subfamily Eyprepocnemidinae Brunner von Wattenwyl, 1893

Tribe Eyprepocnemidini Brunner von Wattenwyl, 1893

Euprepocnemides Bolívar, 1914
Eyprepocnemis Fieber, 1853
Eyprepocprifas Donskoff, 1982
Heteracris Walker, 1870
Shirakiacris Dirsh, 1958

Amphiprosopia Uvarov, 1921
Belonocnemis Bolívar, 1914
Cataloipus Bolívar, 1890
Clomacris Popov, 1981
Cyathosternum Bolívar, 1882
Jagoa Popov, 1980
Jucundacris Uvarov, 1921
Malagacetrus Dirsh, 1962
Malonjeacris Grunshaw, 1995
Metaxymecus Karsch, 1893
Neritius Bolívar, 1914
Ogasawaracris Ito, 2003
Oxyaeida Bolívar, 1914
Paraneritius Jago, 1994
Paraprocticus Grunshaw, 1995
Phyllocercus Uvarov, 1941
Squaroplatacris Liang & Zheng, 1987
Taramassus Giglio-Tos, 1907
Tenebracris Dirsh, 1962
Tropidiopsis Bolívar, 1911
Tylotropidius Stål, 1873

Subfamily Gomphocerinae Fieber, 1853

Tribe Acrolophitini Scudder, 1901

Acrolophitus Thomas, 1871
Bootettix Bruner, 1889

Tribe Amblytropidiini Brunner von Wattenwyl, 1893

Genus Group Peruviae Cadena-Castañeda & Cardona, 2015

Apolobamba Bruner, 1913
Peruvia Scudder, 1890

Amblytropidia Stål, 1873
Boopedon Thomas, 1870
Caribacris Rehn & Hebard, 1938
Fenestra Brunner von Wattenwyl, 1895
Pseudoutanacris Jago, 1971
Sinipta Stål, 1861
Syrbula Stål, 1873

Tribe Arcypterini Bolívar, 1914

Adolfius Harz, 1988
Amplicubitoacris Zheng, 2010
Arcyptera Serville, 1838
Asulconotoides Liu, 1984
Asulconotus Ying, 1974
Aulacobothrus Bolívar, 1902
Berengueria Bolívar, 1909
Brachypteracris Cao & Zheng, 1996
Crucinotacris Jago, 1996
Kangacris Yin, 1983
Kangacrisoides Wang, Zheng & Niu, 2006
Leionotacris Jago, 1996
Leuconemacris Zheng, 1988
Ningxiacris Zheng & He, 1997
Pseudoarcyptera Bolívar, 1909
Ptygonotus Tarbinsky, 1927
Rhaphotittha Karsch, 1896
Suacris Yin, Zhang & Li, 2002
Transtympanacris Lian & Zheng, 1985
Xinjiangacris Zheng, 1993

Tribe Aulocarini Contreras & Chapco, 2006

Ageneotettix McNeill, 1897
Aulocara Scudder, 1876
Eupnigodes McNeill, 1897
Horesidotes Scudder, 1899
Psoloessa Scudder, 1875

Tribe Chrysochraontini Brunner von Wattenwyl, 1893

Barracris Gurney, Strohecker & Helfer, 1964
Chloealtis Harris, 1841
Chrysochraon Fischer, 1853
Confusacris Yin & Li, 1987
Euchorthippus Tarbinsky, 1926
Euthystira Fieber, 1852
Euthystiroides Zhang, Zheng & Ren, 1995
Mongolotettix Rehn, 1928
Podismomorpha Lian & Zheng, 1984
Podismopsis Zubovski, 1900
Pseudoasonus Yin, 1982

Tribe Cibolacrini Otte, 1981

Cibolacris Hebard, 1937
Heliaula Caudell, 1916
Ligurotettix McNeill, 1897
Xeracris Caudell, 1916

Tribe Compsacrini Carbonell, 1995

Chiapacris Otte, 1979
Compsacris Bolívar, 1890
Notopomala Jago, 1971
Phaneroturis Bruner, 1904
Silvitettix Bruner, 1904
Staurorhectus Giglio-Tos, 1897

Tribe Dociostaurini Mistshenko, 1974

Albistriacris Zheng & Lu, 2002
Dociostaurus Fieber, 1853
Eremippus Uvarov, 1926
Eremitusacris Liu, 1981
Leva Bolívar, 1909
Mizonocara Uvarov, 1912
Notostaurus Bey-Bienko, 1933
Xerohippus Uvarov, 1942

Tribe Eritettigini Otte, 1981

Amphitornus McNeill, 1897
Compsacrella Rehn & Hebard, 1938
Eritettix Bruner, 1889
Opeia McNeill, 1897

Tribe Gomphocerini Fieber, 1853

Aeropedellus Hebard, 1935
Bruneria McNeill, 1897
Chorthippus Fieber, 1852
Dasyhippus Uvarov, 1930
Gomphoceridius Bolívar, 1914
Gomphocerippus Roberts, 1941
Gomphoceroides Zheng, Xi & Lian, 1992
Gomphocerus Thunberg, 1815
Mesasippus Tarbinsky, 1931
Myrmeleotettix Bolívar, 1914
Pezohippus Bey-Bienko, 1948
Phlibostroma Scudder, 1875
Pseudochorthippus Defaut, 2012
Schmidtiacris Storozhenko, 2002
Stauroderus Bolívar, 1897
Stenobothroides Xu & Zheng, 1996

Tribe Hypernephiini Mistshenko, 1973

Anaptygus Mistshenko, 1951
Asonus Yin, 1982
Caucasippus Uvarov, 1927
Dysanema Uvarov, 1925
Eclipophleps Tarbinsky, 1927
Grigorija Mistshenko, 1976
Hebetacris Liu, 1981
Hypernephia Uvarov, 1922
Oknosacris Liu, 1981
Oreoptygonotus Tarbinsky, 1927
Ptygippus Mistshenko, 1951
Saxetophilus Umnov, 1930
Stristernum Liu, 1981

Tribe Melanotettigini Otte, 1981

Melanotettix Bruner, 1904

Tribe Mermiriini Brunner von Wattenwyl, 1893

Achurum Saussure, 1861
Mermiria Stål, 1873
Pseudopomala Morse, 1896

Tribe Ochrilidiini Brunner von Wattenwyl, 1893

Gonista Bolívar, 1898
Kirmania Uvarov, 1933
Ochrilidia Stål, 1873
Oxypterna Ramme, 1952

Tribe Orinhippini Yin, Xia et al., 2003

Orinhippus Uvarov, 1921

Tribe Orphulellini Otte, 1979

Dichromorpha Morse, 1896
Laplatacris Rehn, 1939
Orphulella Giglio-Tos, 1894
Orphulina Giglio-Tos, 1894

Tribe Ramburiellini Defaut, 2012

Ramburiella Bolívar, 1906

Tribe Scyllinini Brunner von Wattenwyl, 1893

Alota Bruner, 1913
Borellia Rehn, 1906
Carrascotettix Carbonell, 1995
Cauratettix Roberts, 1937
Euplectrotettix Bruner, 1900
Jagomphocerus Carbonell, 1995
Meloscirtus Bruner, 1906
Parapellopedon Jago, 1971
Pellopedon Bruner, 1911
Rhammatocerus Saussure, 1861
Scyllinula Carbonell, 1995
Stereotettix Rehn, 1906

Tribe Stenobothrini Harz, 1975

Megaulacobothrus Caudell, 1921
Omocestus Bolívar, 1878
Stenobothrus Fischer, 1853

Genus Group Paropomala

Cordillacris Rehn, 1901
Paropomala Scudder, 1899
Prorocorypha Rehn, 1911

Acantherus Scudder & Cockerell, 1902
Acocksacris Dirsh, 1958
Amesotropis Karsch, 1893
Anablepia Uvarov, 1938
Azarea Uvarov, 1926
Baidoceracris Chopard, 1947
Brachycrotaphus Krauss, 1877
Brainia Uvarov, 1922
Carinulaenotus Yin, 1982
Catabothrus Uvarov, 1962
Chrysacris Zheng, 1983
Chrysochraoides Ren et al., 1993
Cophohippus Uvarov, 1953
Dhimbama Henry, 1940
Diablepia Kirby, 1902
Dianacris Yin, 1983
Dnopherula Karsch, 1896
Eleutherotheca Karny, 1907
Ermia Popov, 1957
Esselenia Hebard, 1920
Faureia Uvarov, 1921
Gelastorhinus Brunner von Wattenwyl, 1893
Inyangana Naskrecki, 1992
Italohippus Fontana & La Greca, 1999
Karruhippus Brown, 1989
Komandia Uvarov, 1953
Kraussella Bolívar, 1909
Leurohippus Uvarov, 1940
Lounsburyna Uvarov, 1922
Macrokangacris Yin, 1983
Madurea Bolívar, 1902
Malagasippus Descamps & Wintrebert, 1966
Megafrohippus Jago, 1996
Melinohippus Jago, 1996
Mesopsis Bolívar, 1906
Minihippus Jago, 1996
Neoleva Jago, 1996
Ovambohippus Brown, 1972
Pacris Zhang, Zhang & Yin, 2012
Paragonista Willemse, 1932
Paragymnobothrus Karny, 1910
Pegasidion Saussure, 1861
Phonogaster Henry, 1940
Platypternodes Bolívar, 1908
Pnorisa Stål, 1861
Primnia Stål, 1873
Pseudegnatius Dirsh, 1956
Pseudoberengueria Jago, 1996
Pseudogmothela Karny, 1910
Pseudoleva Jago, 1996
Pusillarolium Zheng, 1999
Quangula Uvarov, 1953
Rammeihippus Woznessenskij, 1996
Salariacris Descamps & Wintrebert, 1966
Sporobolius Uvarov, 1941
Squamopenna Lian & Zheng, 1984
Stenohippus Uvarov, 1926
Tanalanacris Descamps & Wintrebert, 1966
Thyridota Uvarov, 1925
Tinaria Stål, 1861
Unalia Koçak & Kemal, 2008
Xenocheila Uvarov, 1933

Subfamily Habrocneminae Yin, 1982

Habrocnemis Uvarov, 1930
Longzhouacris You & Bi, 1983
Menglacris Jiang & Zheng, 1994

Subfamily Hemiacridinae Dirsh, 1956

Tribe Cranaeini Brunner von Wattenwyl, 1893

Cranae Stål, 1878
Cranaella Ramme, 1941
Craneopsis Willemse, 1933
Opiptacris Walker, 1870
Paracranae Willemse, 1931
Phalaca Bolívar, 1906
Philicranae Willemse, 1955

Tribe Dirshacrini Spearman, 2013

Dirshacris Brown, 1959
Euloryma Spearman, 2013
Hemiloryma Brown, 1973
Labidioloryma Grunshaw, 1986

Tribe Gergisini Dirsh, 1962

Gergis Stål, 1875
Malagasacris Rehn, 1944
Morondavia Dirsh, 1962
Pachyceracris Dirsh, 1962

Tribe Hemiacridini Dirsh, 1956

Hemiacris Walker, 1870
Hemipristocorypha Dirsh, 1952
Pristocorypha Karsch, 1896

Tribe Hieroglyphini Bolívar, 1912

Hieroglyphodes Uvarov, 1922
Hieroglyphus Krauss, 1877
Parahieroglyphus Carl, 1916

Tribe Leptacrini Johnston, 1956

Acanthoxia Bolívar, 1906
Leptacris Walker, 1870
Meruana Sjöstedt, 1910
Sudanacris Uvarov, 1944

Tribe Mesopserini Otte, 1995

Mesopsera Bolívar, 1908
Xenippa Stål, 1878
Xenippacris Descamps & Wintrebert, 1966

Calamippa Henry, 1940
Clonacris Uvarov, 1943
Euthymia Stål, 1875
Galideus Finot, 1908
Glauningia Ramme, 1929
Hysiella Bolívar, 1906
Kassongia Bolívar, 1908
Lopheuthymia Uvarov, 1943
Onetes Rehn, 1944
Oraistes Karsch, 1896
Paulianiobia Dirsh & Descamps, 1968
Proeuthymia Rehn, 1944
Pseudoserpusia Dirsh, 1962
Siruvania Henry, 1940
Willemsella Miller, 1934
Xenippella Kevan, 1966
Xenippoides Chopard, 1952

Subfamily Incolacridinae Tinkham, 1940

Asymmetritania Storozhenko, 2021
Bettotania Willemse, 1933
Incolacris Willemse, 1932
Stolzia Willemse, 1930

Subfamily Leptysminae Brunner von Wattenwyl, 1893

Tribe Chloropseustini Amédégnato, 1974

Chloropseustes Rehn, 1918

Tribe Leptysmini Brunner von Wattenwyl, 1893

Belosacris Rehn & Eades, 1961
Carbonellacris Roberts, 1977
Columbacris Bruner, 1911
Cylindrotettix Bruner, 1906
Leptysma Stål, 1873
Leptysmina Giglio-Tos, 1894
Seabratettix Roberts, 1980
Stenacris Walker, 1870
Tucayaca Bruner, 1920

Tribe Tetrataeniini Brunner von Wattenwyl, 1893

Genus Group Oxybleptae Amédégnato, 1977

Guetaresia Rehn, 1929
Haroldgrantia Carbonell, Ronderos & Mesa, 1967
Stenopola Stål, 1873
Xenismacris Descamps & Amédégnato, 1972

Genus Group Tetrataeniae Brunner von Wattenwyl, 1893

Cornops Scudder, 1875
Eumastusia Bruner, 1911
Mastusia Stål, 1878
Nadiacris Descamps & Amédégnato, 1972
Oxybleptella Giglio-Tos, 1894
Tetrataenia Stål, 1873

Oxyphyma Saussure, 1861

Subfamily Marelliinae Eades, 2000

Marellia Uvarov, 1929

Subfamily Melanoplinae Scudder, 1897

Tribe Conalcaeini Cohn & Cantrall, 1974

Barytettix Scudder, 1897
Conalcaea Scudder, 1897
Huastecacris Fontana & Buzzetti, 2007
Oedomerus Bruner, 1907

Tribe Dactylotini Scudder, 1897

Aztecacris Roberts, 1947
Campylacantha Scudder, 1897
Dactylotum Charpentier, 1845
Dasyscirtus Bruner, 1908
Gymnoscirtetes Scudder, 1897
Liladownsia Fontana, Mariño-Pérez, Woller & Song, 2014
Paraidemona Brunner von Wattenwyl, 1893
Paratylotropidia Brunner von Wattenwyl, 1893
Perixerus Gerstaecker, 1873
Poecilotettix Scudder, 1897

Tribe Dichroplini Rehn & Randell, 1963

Genus Group Scotussae Dinghi, Confalonieri & Cigliano, 2009

Atrachelacris Giglio-Tos, 1894
Chlorus Giglio-Tos, 1898
Dichromatos Cigliano, 2007
Eurotettix Bruner, 1906
Leiotettix Bruner, 1906
Ronderosia Cigliano, 1997
Scotussa Giglio-Tos, 1894

Apacris Hebard, 1931
Baeacris Rowell & Carbonell, 1977
Bogotacris Ronderos, 1979
Boliviacris Ronderos & Cigliano, 1990
Chibchacris Hebard, 1923
Ciglianacris Cadena-Castañeda & Cardona, 2017
Coyacris Ronderos, 1991
Dichroplus Stål, 1873
Digamacris Carbonell, 1989
Hazelacris Ronderos, 1981
Huaylasacris Cigliano, Pocco & Lange, 2011
Keyopsis Ronderos & Cigliano, 1993
Mariacris Ronderos & Turk, 1989
Meridacris Roberts, 1937
Neopedies Hebard, 1931
Orotettix Ronderos & Carbonell, 1994
Pediella Roberts, 1937
Ponderacris Ronderos & Cigliano, 1991
Pseudoscopas Hebard, 1931
Timotes Roberts, 1937
Yungasus Mayer, 2006

Tribe Jivarini Hebard, 1924

Argemiacris Ronderos, 1978
Comansacris Ronderos & Cigliano, 1989
Hydnosternacris Amédégnato & Descamps, 1978
Intiacris Ronderos & Cigliano, 1989
Jivarus Giglio-Tos, 1898
Maeacris Ronderos, 1983
Maylasacris Cigliano & Amédégnato, 2010
Nahuelia Liebermann, 1942
Oreophilacris Roberts, 1937
Urubamba Bruner, 1913

Tribe Melanoplini Scudder, 1897

Aeoloplides Caudell, 1916
Agroecotettix Bruner, 1908
Aptenopedes Scudder, 1878
Cephalotettix Scudder, 1897
Chloroplus Hebard, 1918
Eotettix Scudder, 1897
Floridacris Otte, 2014
Floritettix Otte, 2014
Hesperotettix Scudder, 1876
Hypochlora Brunner von Wattenwyl, 1893
Melanoplus Stål, 1873
Necaxacris Roberts, 1939
Netrosoma Scudder, 1897
Oedaleonotus Scudder, 1897
Paroxya Scudder, 1877
Phaedrotettix Scudder, 1897
Philocleon Scudder, 1897
Phoetaliotes Scudder, 1897
Sinaloa Scudder, 1897

Tribe Podismini Jacobson, 1905

Subtribe Miramellina Rehn & Randell, 1963

Anapodisma Dovnar-Zapolskij, 1932
Capraiuscola Galvagni, 1986
Chortopodisma Ramme, 1951
Cophopodisma Dovnar-Zapolskij, 1932
Curvipennis Huang, 1984
Epipodisma Ramme, 1951
Indopodisma Dovnar-Zapolskij, 1932
Italopodisma Harz, 1973
Miramella Dovnar-Zapolskij, 1932
Nadigella Galvagni, 1986
Oropodisma Uvarov, 1942
Pseudoprumna Dovnar-Zapolskij, 1932
Rammepodisma Weidner, 1969
Zubovskya Dovnar-Zapolskij, 1932

Subtribe Podismina Jacobson, 1905

Appalachia Rehn & Rehn, 1936
Booneacris Rehn & Randell, 1962
Dendrotettix Packard, 1890
Micropodisma Dovnar-Zapolskij, 1932
Niitakacris Tinkham, 1936
Odontopodisma Dovnar-Zapolskij, 1932
Ognevia Ikonnikov, 1911
Podisma Berthold, 1827
Pseudopodisma Mistshenko, 1947
Yunnanacris Chang, 1940

Subtribe Tonkinacridina Ito, 2015

Fruhstorferiola Willemse, 1922
Parapodisma Mistshenko, 1947
Pedopodisma Zheng, 1980
Sinopodisma Chang, 1940
Tonkinacris Carl, 1916

Genus Group Bradynotae Rehn & Randell, 1963

Argiacris Hebard, 1918
Asemoplus Scudder, 1897
Bradynotes Scudder, 1880
Buckellacris Rehn & Rehn, 1945
Hebardacris Rehn, 1952
Hypsalonia Gurney & Eades, 1961
Kingdonella Uvarov, 1933

Anepipodisma Huang, 1984
Bohemanella Ramme, 1951
Cophoprumna Dovnar-Zapolskij, 1932
Dicranophyma Uvarov, 1921
Eokingdonella Yin, 1984
Genimen Bolívar, 1917
Gibbitergum Zheng & Shi, 1998
Guizhouacris Yin & Li, 2006
Liaopodisma Zheng, 1990
Pachypodisma Dovnar-Zapolskij, 1932
Paratonkinacris You & Li, 1983
Peripodisma Willemse, 1972
Phaulotettix Scudder, 1897
Podismodes Ramme, 1939
Prumna Motschulsky, 1859
Prumnacris Rehn & Rehn, 1944
Pseudozubovskia Zheng, Lin, Zhang & Zeng, 2014
Qinlingacris Yin & Chou, 1979
Rectimargipodisma Zheng, Li & Wang, 2004
Rhinopodisma Mistshenko, 1954
Taipodisma Yin, Zheng & Yin, 2014
Xiangelilacris Zheng, Huang & Zhou, 2008

Agnostokasia Gurney & Rentz, 1964
Aidemona Brunner von Wattenwyl, 1893
Akamasacris Cigliano & Otte, 2003
Duartettix Perez-Gelabert & Otte, 2000
Karokia Rehn, 1964
Longgenacris You & Li, 1983
Mexacris Otte, 2007
Mexitettix Otte, 2007
Nisquallia Rehn, 1952
Oaxaca Fontana, Buzzetti & Mariño-Pérez, 2011
Parascopas Bruner, 1906
Pedies Saussure, 1861
Propedies Hebard, 1931
Psilotettix Bruner, 1908
Radacris Ronderos & Sánchez, 1983
Tijucella Amédégnato & Descamps, 1979
Tiyantiyana Cigliano, Pocco & Lange, 2011

Subfamily Oedipodinae Walker, 1871

Tribe Acrotylini Johnston, 1956

Acrotylus Fieber, 1853
Pusana Uvarov, 1940

Tribe Anconiini Hebard, 1937

Anconia Scudder, 1876

Tribe Arphiini Otte, 1995

Arphia Stål, 1873
Lactista Saussure, 1884
Leuronotina Hebard, 1932
Tomonotus Saussure, 1861

Tribe Bryodemini Bey-Bienko, 1930

Andrea Mistshenko, 1989
Angaracris Bey-Bienko, 1930
Bryodema Fieber, 1853
Bryodemacris Benediktov, 1998
Bryodemella Yin, 1982
Compsorhipis Saussure, 1889
Uvaroviola Bey-Bienko, 1930

Tribe Chortophagini Otte, 1995

Chimarocephala Scudder, 1875
Chortophaga Saussure, 1884
Encoptolophus Scudder, 1875
Nebulatettix Gómez, Lightfoot & Miller, 2012
Shotwellia Gurney, 1940

Tribe Epacromiini Brunner von Wattenwyl, 1893

Aiolopus Fieber, 1853
Demirsoyus Sirin & Çiplak, 2004
Epacromius Uvarov, 1942
Heteropternis Stål, 1873
Hilethera Uvarov, 1923
Jasomenia Bolívar, 1914
Paracinema Fischer, 1853
Parahilethera Zheng & Ren, 2007
Platypygius Uvarov, 1942

Tribe Hippiscini Blatchley, 1920

Agymnastus Scudder, 1897
Camnula Stål, 1873
Cratypedes Scudder, 1876
Hadrotettix Scudder, 1876
Heliastus Saussure, 1884
Hippiscus Saussure, 1861
Leprus Saussure, 1861
Pardalophora Saussure, 1884
Sticthippus Scudder, 1892
Xanthippus Saussure, 1884

Tribe Locustini Kirby, 1825

Subtribe Locustina Kirby, 1825

Locusta Linnaeus, 1758
Oedaleus Fieber, 1853
Psophus Fieber, 1853

Brunnerella Saussure, 1888
Chifanicus Benediktov, 2001
Gastrimargus Saussure, 1884
Grammoscapha Uvarov, 1942
Locustana Uvarov, 1921
Pternoscirta Saussure, 1884
Ptetica Saussure, 1884
Pycnodictya Stål, 1873
Pyrgodera Fischer von Waldheim, 1846
Scintharista Saussure, 1884

Tribe Machaerocerini Otte, 1995

Machaerocera Saussure, 1859

Tribe Oedipodini Walker, 1871

Celes Saussure, 1884
Mioscirtus Saussure, 1888
Ochyracris Zheng, 1991
Oedipoda Latreille, 1829
Oedipodacris Willemse, 1932

Tribe Parapleurini Brunner von Wattenwyl, 1893

Ceracris Walker, 1870
Ceracrisoides Liu, 1985
Formosacris Willemse, 1951
Mecostethus Fieber, 1852
Parapleurodes Ramme, 1941
Stethophyma Fischer, 1853
Yiacris Zheng & Chen, 1993

Tribe Psinidiini Otte, 1970

Derotmema Scudder, 1876
Hippopedon Saussure, 1861
Mestobregma Scudder, 1876
Metator McNeill, 1901
Psinidia Stål, 1873
Trachyrhachys Scudder, 1876
Trepidulus McNeill, 1901

Tribe Sphingonotini Johnston, 1956

Conipoda Saussure, 1884
Cophotylus Krauss, 1902
Eusphingoderus Bey-Bienko, 1950
Eusphingonotus Bey-Bienko, 1950
Heliopteryx Uvarov, 1914
Helioscirtus Saussure, 1884
Hyalorrhipis Saussure, 1884
Microtes Scudder, 1900
Phaeonotus Popov, 1951
Pseudoceles Bolívar, 1899
Quadriverticis Zheng, 1999
Sphingoderus Bey-Bienko, 1950
Sphingonotus Fieber, 1852
Tetramerotropis Saussure, 1888
Thalpomena Saussure, 1884
Vosseleriana Uvarov, 1924

Tribe Trilophidiini Shumakov, 1963

Trilophidia Stål, 1873

Tribe Trimerotropini Blatchley, 1920

Circotettix Scudder, 1876
Conozoa Saussure, 1884
Dissosteira Scudder, 1876
Spharagemon Scudder, 1875
Trimerotropis Stål, 1873

Tribe Tropidolophini Otte, 1995

Tropidolophus Thomas, 1873

Angaracrisoides Gong & Zheng, 2003
Asphingoderus Bey-Bienko, 1950
Atympanum Yin, 1982
Aulocaroides Werner, 1913
Aurilobulus Yin, 1979
Austroicetes Uvarov, 1925
Brancsikellus Berg, 1899
Chinabacris Kumar & Usmani, 2016
Chloebora Saussure, 1884
Chondronotulus Uvarov, 1956
Chortoicetes Brunner von Wattenwyl, 1893
Crinita Dirsh, 1949
Cyanicaudata Yin, 1979
Diraneura Scudder, 1897
Dittopternis Saussure, 1884
Elmisia Dirsh, 1949
Eremoscopus Bey-Bienko, 1951
Eurysternacris Chopard, 1947
Fitzgeraldia Uvarov, 1952
Homoeopternis Uvarov, 1953
Humbe Bolívar, 1882
Jinabia Uvarov, 1952
Kinshaties Zheng, 1977
Leptopternis Saussure, 1884
Melaniacris Zheng, Zhao & Dong, 2011
Meristopteryx Saussure, 1888
Morphacris Walker, 1870
Nepalacris Balderson & Yin, 1987
Oreacris Bolívar, 1911
Promesosternus Yin, 1982
Pseudaiolopus Hollis, 1967
Pycnocrania Uvarov, 1941
Pycnodella Descamps, 1965
Pycnostictus Saussure, 1884
Qualetta Sjöstedt, 1921
Rashidia Uvarov, 1933
Tibetacris Chen, 1964
Tmetonota Saussure, 1884
Uganda Bolívar, 1909
Zimbabwea Miller, 1949
† Aestilocusta Zhang, 1989
† Mioedipoda Stidham & Stidham, 2000
† Nymphacrida Zhang, Sun & Zhang, 1994
† Oedemastopoda Zhang, Sun & Zhang, 1994

Subfamily Ommatolampidinae Brunner von Wattenwyl, 1893

Tribe Abracrini Amédégnato, 1974

Abracris Walker, 1870
Agesander Stål, 1878
Arimacris Matiotti da Costa & Silva Carvalho, 2006
Caruaruacris Matiotti da Costa & Silva Carvalho, 2006
Eujivarus Bruner, 1911
Eusitalces Bruner, 1911
Ixalotettix Amédégnato & Descamps, 1979
Jodacris Giglio-Tos, 1897
Liebermannacris Matiotti da Costa & Silva Carvalho, 2006
Monneacris Amédégnato & Descamps, 1979
Omalotettix Bruner, 1906
Orthoscapheus Bruner, 1906
Parasitalces Bruner, 1911
Psiloscirtus Bruner, 1911
Rhachicreagra Rehn, 1905
Robustusacris Matiotti da Costa & Silva Carvalho, 2006
Roppacris Amédégnato & Descamps, 1979
Salvadoracris Matiotti da Costa & Silva Carvalho, 2006
Sitalces Stål, 1878
Teinophaus Bruner, 1908
Xiphiola Bolívar, 1896

Tribe Aspidophymini Bolívar, 1884

Aspidophyma Bolívar, 1884
Loepacris Descamps & Amédégnato, 1973
Malezacris Amédégnato & Poulain, 1998
Thamnacris Descamps & Amédégnato, 1972

Tribe Clematodinini Amédégnato, 1974

Clematodina Günther, 1940
Rehnuciera Carbonell, 1969

Tribe Ommatolampidini Brunner von Wattenwyl, 1893

Subtribe Ommatolampina Brunner von Wattenwyl, 1893

Dicaearchus Stål, 1878
Episomacris Carbonell & Descamps, 1978
Eucosmetacris Carbonell & Descamps, 1978
Eulampiacris Carbonell & Descamps, 1978
Hippariacris Carbonell & Descamps, 1978
Kyphiacris Carbonell & Descamps, 1978
Lamiacris Carbonell & Descamps, 1978
Leptopteracris Carbonell & Descamps, 1978
Muriciacris Matiotti da Costa, 2014
Nepiopteracris Carbonell & Descamps, 1978
Ommatolampis Burmeister, 1838
Peruana Koçak & Kemal, 2008
Ronderosacris Carbonell & Descamps, 1978
Stenelutracris Carbonell & Descamps, 1978
Tingomariacris Carbonell & Descamps, 1978

Subtribe Oulenotacrina Amédégnato, 1977

Agrotacris Descamps, 1979
Anablysis Gerstaecker, 1889
Ananotacris Descamps, 1978
Antiphanes Stål, 1878
Barypygiacris Descamps, 1979
Demochares Bolívar, 1906
Eurybiacris Descamps, 1979
Hysterotettix Descamps, 1979
Odontonotacris Descamps, 1978
Pseudhypsipages Descamps, 1977

Subtribe Vilernina Brunner von Wattenwyl, 1893

Genus Group Nicarchae Brunner von Wattenwyl, 1893

Acridocryptus Descamps, 1976
Aptoceras Bruner, 1908
Bryophilacris Descamps, 1976
Cryptacris Descamps & Rowell, 1984
Hypsipages Gerstaecker, 1889
Nicarchus Stål, 1878
Rhabdophilacris Descamps, 1976
Sciaphilacris Descamps, 1976
Sclerophilacris Descamps, 1976

Agenacris Amédégnato & Descamps, 1979
Caletes Redtenbacher, 1892
Carbonelliella Cadena-Castañeda & Cardona, 2015
Leptomerinthoprora Rehn, 1905
Leticiacris Amédégnato & Descamps, 1978
Locheuma Scudder, 1897
Lysacris Descamps & Amédégnato, 1972
Machaeropoles Rehn, 1909
Pseudovilerna Descamps & Amédégnato, 1989
Reyesacris Fontana, Buzzetti & Mariño-Pérez, 2011
Sciponacris Descamps, 1978
Vilerna Stål, 1873

Tribe Pauracrini Amédégnato, 1974

Christenacris Descamps & Rowell, 1984
Pauracris Descamps & Amédégnato, 1972

Tribe Pycnosarcini Liebermann, 1951

Apoxycephalacris Amédégnato & Descamps, 1978
Pycnosarcus Bolívar, 1906

Tribe Syntomacrini Amédégnato, 1974

Subtribe Caloscirtina Descamps, 1977

Adelacris Descamps & Amédégnato, 1972
Anoptotettix Amédégnato & Descamps, 1979
Ateliacris Descamps & Rowell, 1978
Beoscirtacris Descamps, 1977
Calohippus Descamps, 1978
Caloscirtus Bruner, 1911
Eugenacris Descamps & Amédégnato, 1972
Hylescirtacris Descamps, 1978
Machigengacris Descamps, 1977
Miacris Descamps, 1981
Microtylopteryx Rehn, 1905
Ociotettix Amédégnato & Descamps, 1979
Ortalacris Descamps & Amédégnato, 1972
Oteroa Amédégnato & Descamps, 1979
Oyampiacris Descamps, 1977
Pseudanniceris Descamps, 1977
Stigacris Descamps, 1977

Subtribe Syntomacrina Amédégnato, 1974

Amblyxypha Uvarov, 1925
Anniceris Stål, 1878
Deinacris Amédégnato & Descamps, 1979
Osmiliola Giglio-Tos, 1897
Phaulacris Amédégnato & Descamps, 1979
Pollostacris Amédégnato & Descamps, 1979
Pseudococama Descamps & Amédégnato, 1971
Rhabdoscirtus Bruner, 1911
Rhopsotettix Amédégnato & Descamps, 1979
Rhyphoscirtus Amédégnato & Descamps, 1979
Seabracris Amédégnato & Descamps, 1979
Syntomacrella Descamps, 1978
Syntomacris Walker, 1870
Xiphidiopteron Bruner, 1910

Acridurus Perez-Gelabert, Dominici, Hierro & Otte, 1995
Beckeracris Amédégnato & Descamps, 1979
Guajirus Perez-Gelabert, 2020
Hispanacris Perez-Gelabert, Dominici, Hierro & Otte, 1995
Hispanotettix Perez-Gelabert, Dominici, Hierro & Otte, 1995
Lagidacris Amédégnato & Descamps, 1979
Tergoceracris Perez-Gelabert & Otte, 2003

Subfamily Oxyinae Brunner von Wattenwyl, 1893

Tribe Oxyini Brunner von Wattenwyl, 1893

Bermiella Bolívar, 1912
Bermiodes Bolívar, 1912
Bermius Stål, 1878
Daperria Sjöstedt, 1921
Emeiacris Zheng, 1981
Gesonula Uvarov, 1940
Lucretilis Stål, 1878
Nepalocaryanda Ingrisch, 1990
Oxya Serville, 1831
Oxyina Hollis, 1975
Pseudocaryanda Willemse, 1939
Pseudocranae Bolívar, 1898
Pseudoxya Yin & Liu, 1987
Quilta Stål, 1861
Thanmoia Ramme, 1941
Tolgadia Sjöstedt, 1920

Tribe Praxibulini Rehn, 1957

Kosciuscola Sjöstedt, 1934
Methiola Sjöstedt, 1920
Methiolopsis Rehn, 1957
Praxibulus Bolívar, 1906

Badistica Karsch, 1891
Boninoxya Ishikawa, 2011
Chitaura Bolívar, 1918
Cylindrotiltus Ramme, 1929
Digentia Stål, 1878
Dirshia Brown, 1962
Gerista Bolívar, 1905
Hilloxya Kumar & Chandra, 2019
Hygracris Uvarov, 1921
Ochlandriphaga Henry, 1933
Oxycrobylus Ingrisch, 1989
Oxytauchira Ramme, 1941
Pterotiltus Karsch, 1893

Subfamily Pauliniinae Hebard, 1923

Paulinia Blanchard, 1843

Subfamily Pezotettiginae Brunner von Wattenwyl, 1893

Pezotettix Burmeister, 1840
Sphenophyma Uvarov, 1934

Subfamily Proctolabinae Amédégnato, 1974

Tribe Coscineutini Brunner von Wattenwyl, 1893

Coscineuta Stål, 1873

Tribe Proctolabini Amédégnato, 1974

Subtribe Eucephalacrina Amédégnato & Poulain, 1987

Eucephalacris Descamps, 1976
Pareucephalacris Descamps, 1976

Subtribe Lithoscirtina Amédégnato & Poulain, 1987

Ampelophilus Hebard, 1924
Drymacris Descamps & Rowell, 1978
Drymophilacris Descamps, 1976
Leioscapheus Bruner, 1907
Lithoscirtus Bruner, 1908
Paratela Descamps & Rowell, 1978
Tela Hebard, 1932

Subtribe Proctolabina Amédégnato, 1974

Adelotettix Bruner, 1910
Azotocerus Descamps, 1976
Balachowskyacris Descamps & Amédégnato, 1972
Cercoceracris Descamps, 1976
Cryptocloeus Descamps, 1976
Dendrophilacris Descamps, 1976
Dorstacris Descamps, 1978
Halticacris Descamps, 1976
Kritacris Descamps, 1976
Poecilocloeus Bruner, 1910
Proctolabus Saussure, 1859
Witotacris Descamps, 1976
Zodiacris Descamps, 1980
Zosperamerus Bruner, 1908

Subtribe Saltonacrina Amédégnato & Descamps, 1980

Eucerotettix Descamps, 1980
Harpotettix Descamps, 1981
Loretacris Amédégnato & Poulain, 1987
Saltonacris Descamps, 1976
Ypsophilacris Descamps, 1980

Subfamily Rhytidochrotinae Brunner von Wattenwyl, 1893

Brakeracris Rowell, 1995
Chiriquacris Rowell & Bentos-Pereira, 2005
Driphilacris Descamps & Amédégnato, 1972
Exerythracris Rowell, 1995
Galidacris Descamps & Amédégnato, 1972
Hylopedetes Rehn, 1929
Lathacris Descamps & Amédégnato, 1972
Liparacris Descamps & Amédégnato, 1972
Micropaon Descamps & Rowell, 1984
Muyscacris Hebard, 1923
Oedalacris Descamps & Amédégnato, 1972
Opaon Kirby, 1902
Opaonella Hebard, 1923
Parapiezops Hebard, 1923
Paropaon Hebard, 1923
Piezops Hebard, 1923
Rhytidochrota Stål, 1873
Scirtopaon Descamps & Rowell, 1984
Talamancacris Rowell, 1995
Trichopaon Descamps & Amédégnato, 1972

Subfamily Spathosterninae Rehn, 1957

Tribe Spathosternini Rehn, 1957

Laxabilla Sjöstedt, 1934
Paraspathosternum Ramme, 1929
Spathosternum Krauss, 1877

Subfamily Teratodinae Brunner von Wattenwyl, 1893

Acrostegastes Karsch, 1896
Esfandiaria Popov, 1951
Eurynotacris Ramme, 1931
Kabulia Ramme, 1928
Lyrotyloides Bey-Bienko, 1956
Lyrotylus Uvarov, 1924
Robecchia Schulthess, 1898
Teratodes Brullé, 1835

Subfamily Tropidopolinae Jacobson, 1905

Tribe Tristriini Mistshenko, 1945

Tristria Stål, 1873
Tristriella Descamps & Wintrebert, 1967

Tribe Tropidopolini Jacobson, 1905

Tropidopola Stål, 1873

Afroxyrrhepes Uvarov, 1943
Chloroxyrrhepes Uvarov, 1943
Dabba Uvarov, 1933
Homoxyrrhepes Uvarov, 1926
Limnippa Uvarov, 1941
Mesopsilla Ramme, 1929
Musimoja Uvarov, 1953
Neooxyrrhepes Khan & Usmani, 2019
Petamella Giglio-Tos, 1907
Pseudotristria Dirsh, 1961

Tribe Eucopiocerini Descamps, 1975

Chapulacris Descamps, 1975
Eucopiocera Bruner, 1908
Halffterina Descamps, 1975
Leptalacris Descamps & Rowell, 1978

Atopacris Amédégnato & Poulain, 1998
Castetsia Bolívar, 1902
Jumandiacris Amédégnato & Poulain, 1998
Melliacris Ramme, 1941
Palandella Amédégnato & Poulain, 1998
Pileolum Bolívar, 1917
Tylotropidiopsis Storozhenko, 1992
†Heeracris Zeuner, 1937
†Menatacridium Piton, 1936
†Taeniopodites Cockerell, 1909
†Tyrbula Scudder, 1885
