= Sinstauchira =

Scientific classification
- Kingdom: Animalia
- Phylum: Arthropoda
- Clade: Pancrustacea
- Class: Insecta
- Order: Orthoptera
- Suborder: Caelifera
- Family: Acrididae
- Subfamily: Catantopinae
- Genus: Sinstauchira; Zheng, 1981

Genus of grasshoppers

Sinstauchira is a genus of grasshoppers in the subfamily Catantopinae, not assigned to any tribe. Species can be found in southern China and Vietnam.

== Species ==
The Orthoptera Species File. lists:

- Sinstauchira gressitti (Tinkham, 1940)
- Sinstauchira hui Li, Lu, Jiang & Meng, 1995
- Sinstauchira puerensis Li, Xu & Zheng, 2014
- Sinstauchira pui Liang & Zheng, 1986
- Sinstauchira ruficornis Huang, 1985
- Sinstauchira yaoshanensis Li, 1987
- Sinstauchira yunnana Zheng, 1981 - type species
