= Sedulia =

Scientific classification
- Domain: Eukaryota
- Kingdom: Animalia
- Phylum: Arthropoda
- Class: Insecta
- Order: Orthoptera
- Suborder: Caelifera
- Family: Acrididae
- Subfamily: Catantopinae
- Genus: Sedulia; Stål, 1878

Genus of grasshoppers

Sedulia is a genus of grasshoppers in the subfamily Catantopinae, not assigned to any tribe. Species can be found in peninsular Malaysia and other parts of Malesia (records are probably incomplete).

Similar genera include the recently differentiated: Anasedulia, Leosedulia and Striatosedulia. A key to species and closely related genera is given by Tan et al. who state that "Southeast Asia is a highly biodiverse region with many species of grasshoppers described since the 19th century. Historical species descriptions are however often not comprehensive and do not meet the modern criteria of taxonomy. Previously used characters for identification need to be re-examined."

== Species ==
The Orthoptera Species File. lists:

- Sedulia perakensis Willemse, 1932
- Sedulia specularia Stål, 1875 - type species (as Traulia specularia Stål)
