= Mopla =

Scientific classification
- Kingdom: Animalia
- Phylum: Arthropoda
- Class: Insecta
- Order: Orthoptera
- Suborder: Caelifera
- Family: Acrididae
- Subfamily: Catantopinae
- Genus: Mopla; Henry, 1940

Genus of insects

Mopla is a genus of grasshoppers in the subfamily Catantopinae with no tribe assigned. Two species have been described which are endemic to the Western Ghats of India. The genus is named after the Moplah muslim ethnic group in the Malabar region of Kerala.

== Species ==
The Orthoptera Species File lists:

- Mopla guttata Henry, 1940 - type species
- Mopla rubra Henry, 1940
