= Barombia =

Scientific classification
- Domain: Eukaryota
- Kingdom: Animalia
- Phylum: Arthropoda
- Class: Insecta
- Order: Orthoptera
- Suborder: Caelifera
- Family: Acrididae
- Subfamily: Catantopinae
- Genus: Barombia; Karsch, 1891

Genus of grasshoppers

Barombia is a genus of grasshoppers in the subfamily Catantopinae with no tribe assigned. Species can be found in Cameroun.

== Species ==
The Orthoptera Species File lists a monotypic species Barombia tuberculosa Karsch, 1891.
