= Eliya =

Scientific classification
- Domain: Eukaryota
- Kingdom: Animalia
- Phylum: Arthropoda
- Class: Insecta
- Order: Orthoptera
- Suborder: Caelifera
- Family: Acrididae
- Subfamily: Catantopinae
- Genus: Eliya; Uvarov, 1927

Genus of insects

Eliya is a genus of grasshoppers in the subfamily Catantopinae with no tribe assigned. Species can be found in Sri Lanka.

== Species ==
The Orthoptera Species File. lists:

- Eliya gibbosa Henry, 1933
- Eliya pedestris Uvarov, 1927
- Eliya pictipes Uvarov, 1927
- Eliya venusta Henry, 1933
