= Calderonia =

Scientific classification
- Domain: Eukaryota
- Kingdom: Animalia
- Phylum: Arthropoda
- Class: Insecta
- Order: Orthoptera
- Suborder: Caelifera
- Family: Acrididae
- Subfamily: Catantopinae
- Genus: Calderonia; Bolívar, 1908

Genus of grasshoppers

Calderonia is a genus of grasshoppers in the subfamily Catantopinae with no tribe assigned. Species can be found in Madagascar.

== Species ==
The Orthoptera Species File lists a monotypic species Calderonia biplagiata Bolívar, 1908.
