= Oxyrrhepes =

Scientific classification
- Kingdom: Animalia
- Phylum: Arthropoda
- Class: Insecta
- Order: Orthoptera
- Suborder: Caelifera
- Family: Acrididae
- Subfamily: Catantopinae
- Genus: Oxyrrhepes; Stål, 1873

Genus of grasshoppers

Oxyrrhepes is a genus of grasshoppers in the family Acrididae and subfamily Catantopinae; it is the only genus placed in tribe Oxyrrhepini Tinkham, 1940.

The recorded distribution of species includes: Sri Lanka, China, Indo-China and Malesia.

== Species ==
The Orthoptera Species File lists:

1. Oxyrrhepes cantonensis Tinkham, 1940 - China
2. Oxyrrhepes meyeri Willemse, 1936 - Sulawesi
3. Oxyrrhepes obtusa Haan, 1842 - type species (as Opsomala lineatitarsis Stål) - China, Vietnam, Sri Lanka, Malesia
