= Anacranae =

Scientific classification
- Domain: Eukaryota
- Kingdom: Animalia
- Phylum: Arthropoda
- Class: Insecta
- Order: Orthoptera
- Suborder: Caelifera
- Family: Acrididae
- Tribe: Gereniini
- Genus: Anacranae; Miller, 1934

Genus of grasshoppers

Anacranae is a genus of grasshoppers in the subfamily Catantopinae and tribe Gereniini. Species can be found in Indo-China, including peninsular Malaysia, where the type species is found.

== Species ==
The Orthoptera Species File. lists:

1. Anacranae beybienkoi Storozhenko, 2005 - Thailand
2. Anacranae gorochovi Storozhenko, 2002 - Vietnam
3. Anacranae nuda Miller, 1934 - type species - locality Selangor, Malaysia
4. Anacranae vietnamensis Storozhenko, 2002 - Vietnam
