= Chapacris =

Scientific classification
- Domain: Eukaryota
- Kingdom: Animalia
- Phylum: Arthropoda
- Class: Insecta
- Order: Orthoptera
- Suborder: Caelifera
- Family: Acrididae
- Subfamily: Catantopinae
- Tribe: Tauchirini
- Genus: Chapacris; Tinkham, 1940
- Species: C. tonkinensis

Binomial name
- Chapacris tonkinensis Tinkham, 1940

Genus of grasshoppers

Chapacris is a monotypic genus of grasshoppers containing only the species Chapacris tonkinensis. It is in the family Acrididae and subfamily Catantopinae. This species can be found in Vietnam.
