= Navasia =

Scientific classification
- Domain: Eukaryota
- Kingdom: Animalia
- Phylum: Arthropoda
- Class: Insecta
- Order: Orthoptera
- Suborder: Caelifera
- Family: Acrididae
- Subfamily: Catantopinae
- Genus: Navasia; Kirby, 1914

Genus of grasshoppers

Navasia is a monotypic genus of grasshoppers belonging to the subfamily Catantopinae (no tribe assigned).

Species:

- Navasia insularis Kirby, 1914
