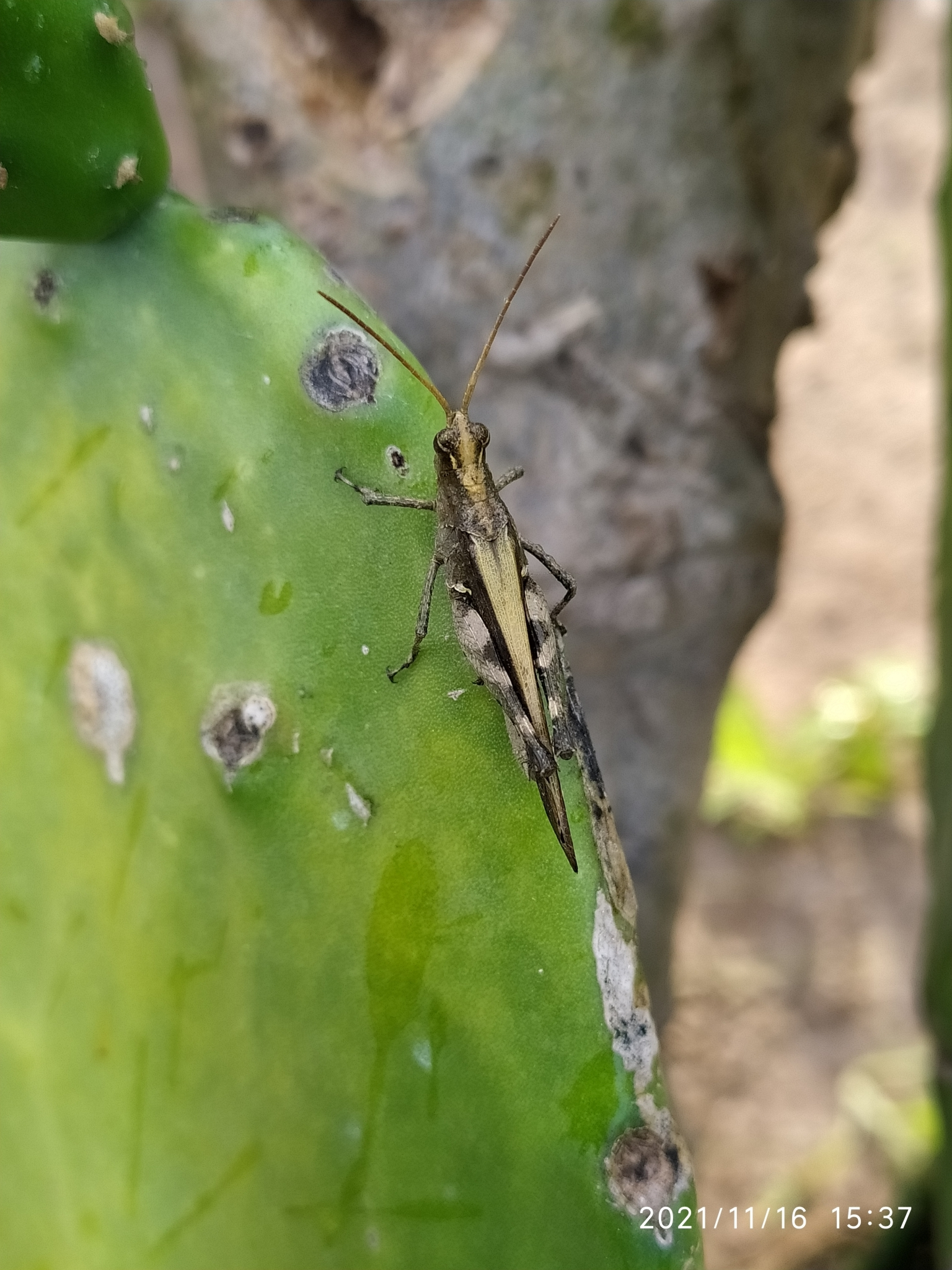
- Machaerocera mexicana, Mexican blue-wing grasshopper, México

Scientific classification
- Domain: Eukaryota
- Kingdom: Animalia
- Phylum: Arthropoda
- Class: Insecta
- Order: Orthoptera
- Suborder: Caelifera
- Family: Acrididae
- Subfamily: Oedipodinae
- Tribe: Machaerocerini; Otte, 1995
- Genus: Machaerocera; Saussure, 1859
- Species: M. mexicana

Binomial name
- Machaerocera mexicana Saussure, 1859

= Machaerocera =

Genus of grasshoppers

Machaerocera is a genus of band-winged grasshoppers in the family Acrididae. This genus has a single species, Machaerocera mexicana. It is found in Mexico, the southwestern United States, and in Central and South America.
