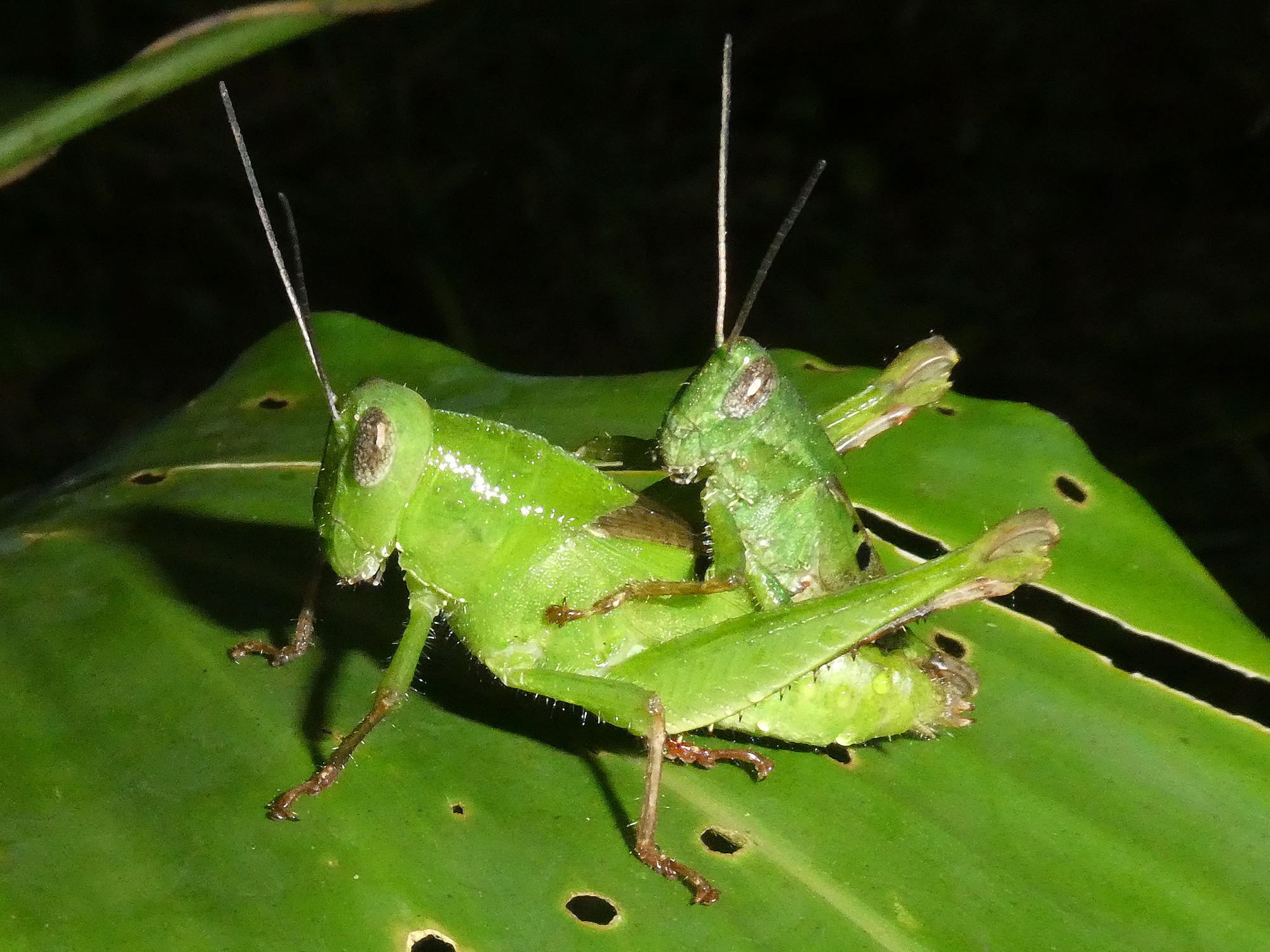
- Gerenia cf. thai, from Cat Tien National Park: female and male

Scientific classification
- Kingdom: Animalia
- Phylum: Arthropoda
- Clade: Pancrustacea
- Class: Insecta
- Order: Orthoptera
- Suborder: Caelifera
- Family: Acrididae
- Tribe: Gereniini
- Genus: Gerenia; Stål, 1878

Synonyms
- Etesius Bolívar, 1917

= Gerenia (insect) =

Genus of grasshoppers

Gerenia is a genus of grasshoppers in the subfamily Catantopinae and tribe Gereniini. Species can be found in India and Indo-China.

== Species ==
The Orthoptera Species File. lists:

1. Gerenia abbreviata Brunner von Wattenwyl, 1893 (Myanmar: 2 subspecies)
2. Gerenia ambulans Stål, 1878
3. Gerenia bengalensis Bhowmik & Halder, 1984
4. Gerenia dorsalis (Walker, 1870)
5. Gerenia intermedia Brunner von Wattenwyl, 1893
6. Gerenia kongtumensis Mistshenko & Storozhenko, 1990
7. Gerenia mizoramia Kumar & Chandra, 2022
8. Gerenia obliquinervis Stål, 1878 - type species (locality India)
9. Gerenia pustulipennis (Walker, 1871)
10. Gerenia selangorensis Miller, 1935
11. Gerenia thai Storozhenko, 2009
12. Gerenia waterhousei (Bolívar, 1917)
