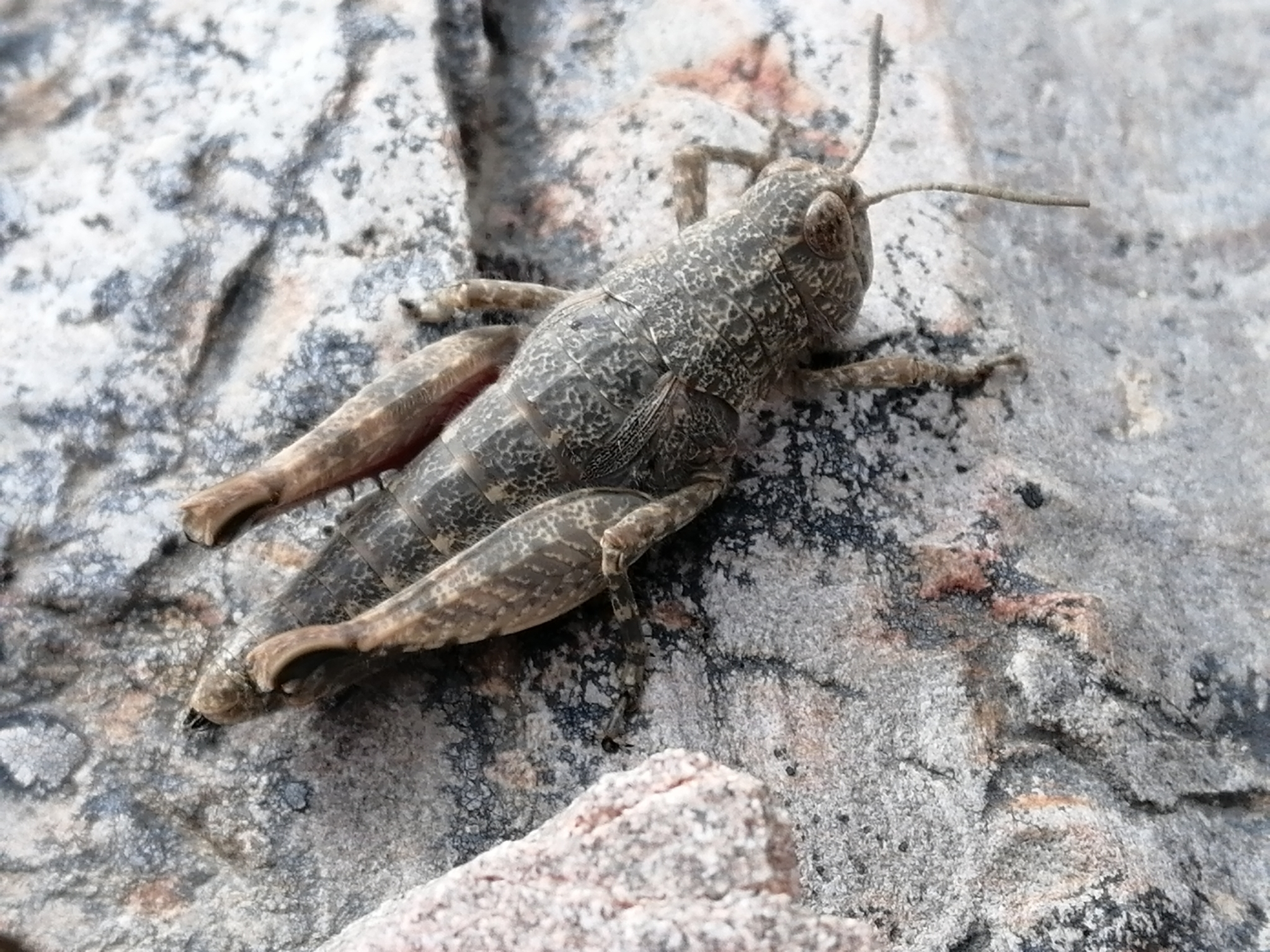
- Brachaspis nivalis

Scientific classification
- Domain: Eukaryota
- Kingdom: Animalia
- Phylum: Arthropoda
- Class: Insecta
- Order: Orthoptera
- Suborder: Caelifera
- Family: Acrididae
- Subfamily: Catantopinae
- Genus: Brachaspis; Hutton, 1898

= Brachaspis =

Genus of insects

Brachaspis is a genus of grasshoppers belonging to the family Acrididae.

The species of this genus are found in New Zealand. In 2023 all species in this genus were moved to the genus Sigaus.

Species:

- Brachaspis collinus (Hutton, 1898)
- Brachaspis nivalis (Hutton, 1898) - type species
- Brachaspis robustus Bigelow, 1967
