= Bibractella =

Scientific classification
- Domain: Eukaryota
- Kingdom: Animalia
- Phylum: Arthropoda
- Class: Insecta
- Order: Orthoptera
- Suborder: Caelifera
- Family: Acrididae
- Subfamily: Catantopinae
- Tribe: Gereniini
- Genus: Bibractella; Storozhenko, 2002
- Species: B. sugonjaevi

Binomial name
- Bibractella sugonjaevi Storozhenko, 2002

Genus of grasshoppers

Bibractella is a monotypic genus of grasshoppers in the subfamily Catantopinae and tribe Gereniini.

The single species Bibractella sugonjaevi has only been recorded from Vietnam to date.
