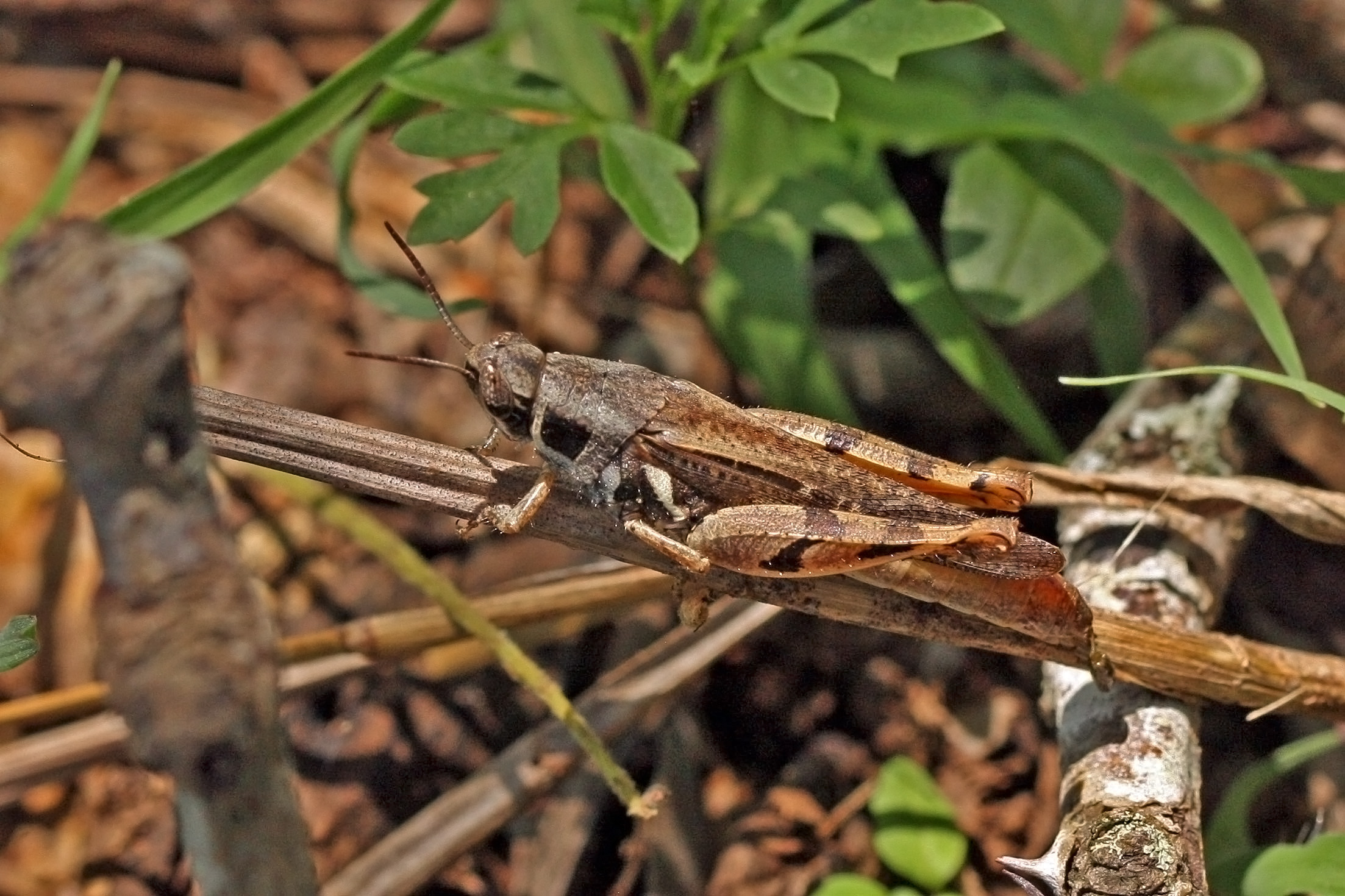
- Catantops humeralis Kwa-Zulu Natal, South Africa

Scientific classification
- Kingdom: Animalia
- Phylum: Arthropoda
- Clade: Pancrustacea
- Class: Insecta
- Order: Orthoptera
- Suborder: Caelifera
- Family: Acrididae
- Tribe: Catantopini
- Genus: Catantops; Schaum, 1853

Type species
- Catantops melanostictus Schaum

Species
- See text

Synonyms
- Cantantops Walker, 1870

= Catantops =

Genus of grasshoppers

Catantops is a genus of grasshoppers in the tribe Catantopini and is typical of the subfamily Catantopinae. Species can be found in Africa, including Madagascar and subcontinental India.

== Species ==
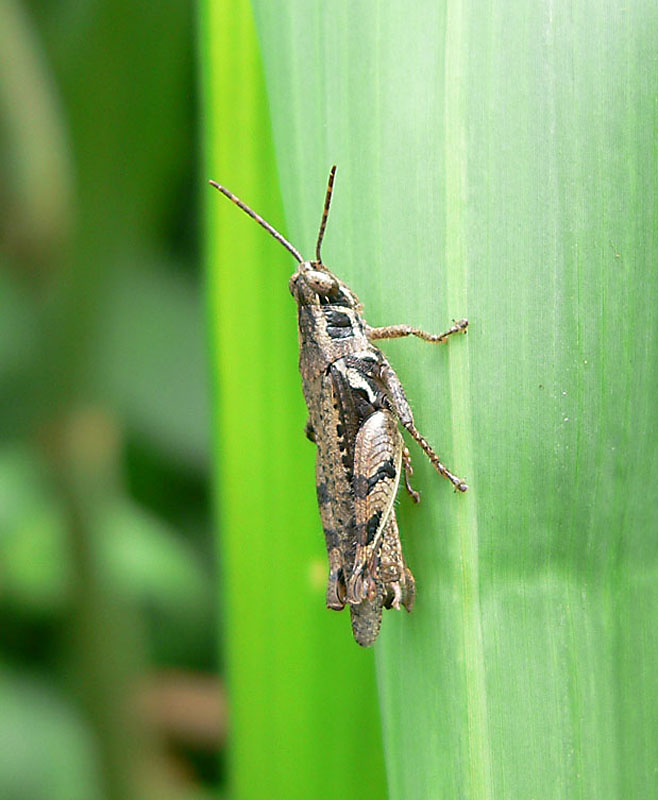
Catantops sylvestris male

The Orthoptera Species File lists:

- Catantops annexus Bolívar, 1917
- Catantops australis Jago, 1984
- Catantops brevipennis Wintrebert, 1972
- Catantops erubescens (Walker, 1870)
- Catantops humeralis (Thunberg, 1815)
- Catantops ituriensis Rehn, 1914
- Catantops janus Rehn, 1914
- Catantops kasengo Jago, 1994
- Catantops magnicercus Uvarov, 1953
- Catantops melanostictus Schaum, 1853 - type species
- Catantops minor Dirsh, 1956
- Catantops modestus Karny, 1917
- Catantops momboensis Sjöstedt, 1931
- Catantops nephiostictus Jago, 1984
- Catantops ochthephilus Jago, 1984
- Catantops parasylvestris Jago, 1984
- Catantops stenocrobyloides Karny, 1907
- Catantops stramineus (Walker, 1870)
- Catantops sylvestris Jago, 1984
- Catantops tanganus Dirsh, 1956
- Catantops terminalis Ramme, 1929
- Catantops trimaculatus Uvarov, 1953
- Catantops unimaculata Mahmood, Yousuf & Khaliq, 2002

== Synonyms ==
The names Catantops debilis Krauss 1901 and Catantops elegans Karny, 1907 are synonyms for Cryptocatantops debilis (Krauss, 1901).
