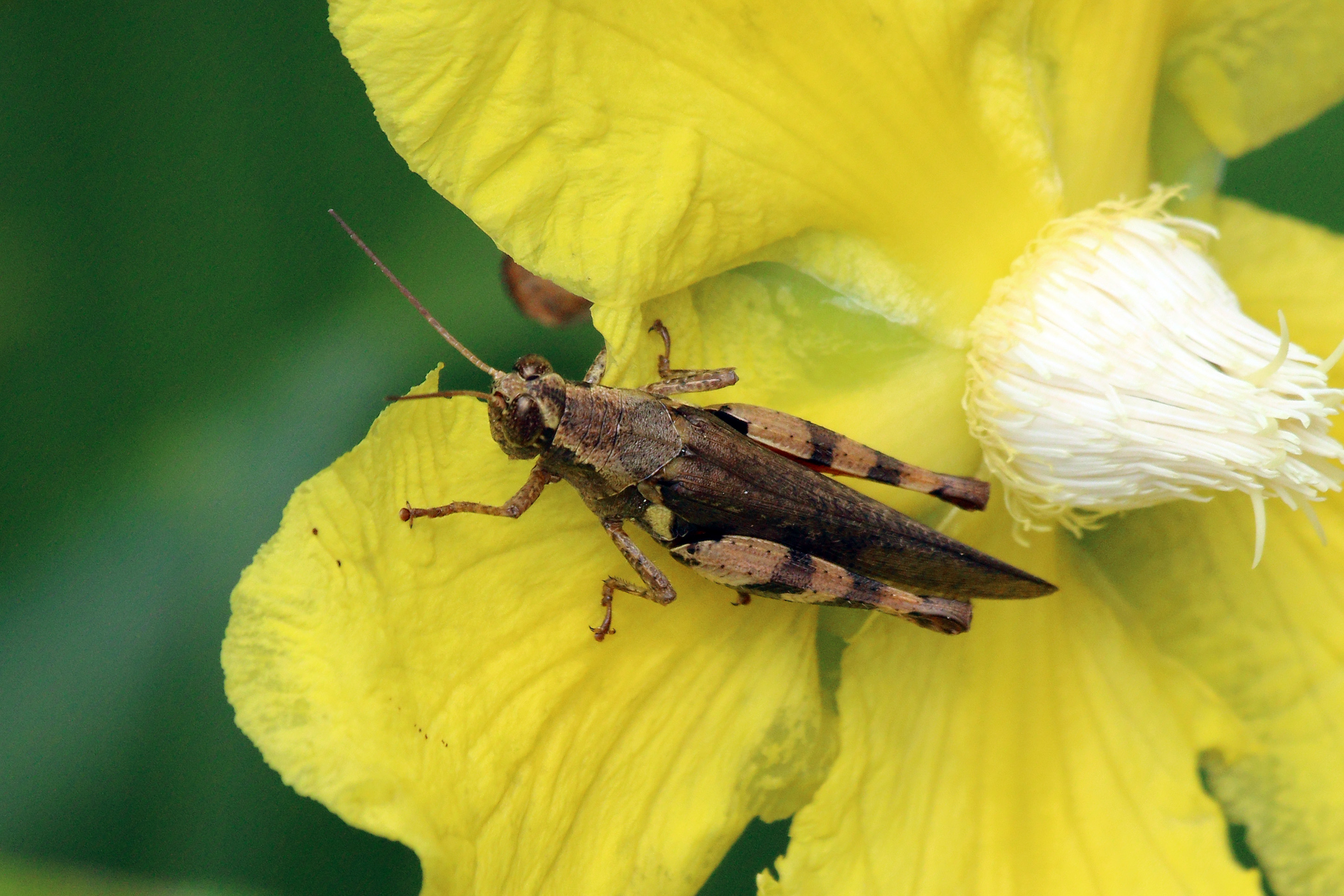
- Xenocatantops humilis

Scientific classification
- Kingdom: Animalia
- Phylum: Arthropoda
- Clade: Pancrustacea
- Class: Insecta
- Order: Orthoptera
- Suborder: Caelifera
- Family: Acrididae
- Tribe: Catantopini
- Genus: Xenocatantops; Dirsh, 1953

= Xenocatantops =

Genus of grasshoppers

Xenocatantops is a genus of grasshoppers (Caelifera: Acrididae) in the subfamily Catantopinae and tribe Catantopini. Species can be found in Africa, India, China, Indo-China and Malesia.

== Species ==
The Orthoptera Species File and Catalogue of Life list the following:

- Xenocatantops acanthraus Zheng, Li & Wang, 2004
- Xenocatantops areolatus Bolívar, 1908
- Xenocatantops brachycerus Willemse, 1932
- Xenocatantops dirshi Willemse, 1968
- Xenocatantops henryi Bolívar, 1917
- Xenocatantops humilis Serville, 1838 - type species (as Acridium humile Serville)
- Xenocatantops jagabandhui Bhowmik, 1986
- Xenocatantops karnyi Kirby, 1910
- Xenocatantops liaoningensis Wang, 2007
- Xenocatantops longpennis Cao & Yin, 2007
- Xenocatantops luteitibia Zheng & Jiang, 2002
- Xenocatantops parazernyi Jago, 1982
- Xenocatantops sauteri Ramme, 1941
- Xenocatantops taiwanensis Cao & Yin, 2007
- Xenocatantops zernyi Ramme, 1929
