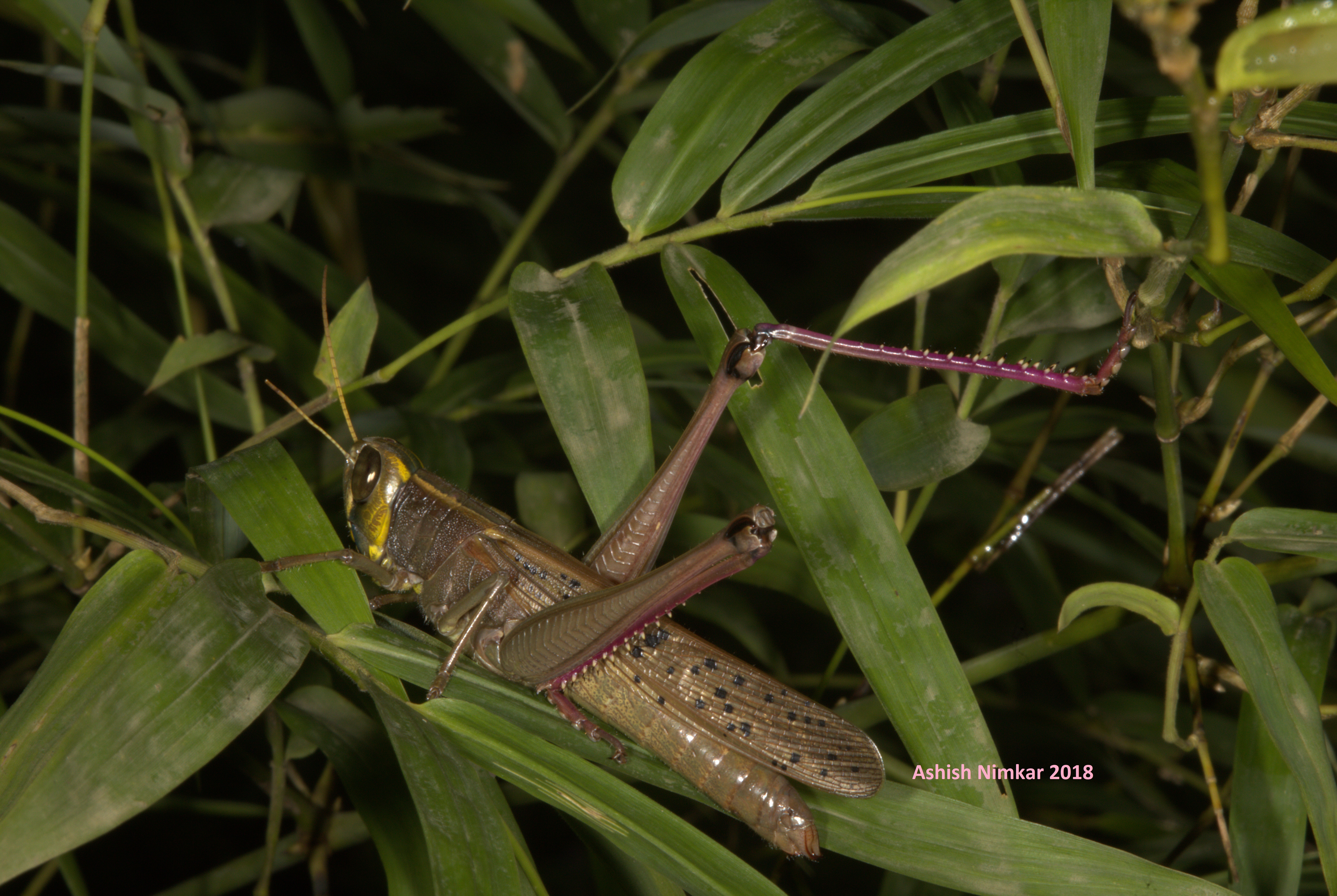
- Spotted winged Locust (Choroedocus illustris)

Scientific classification
- Domain: Eukaryota
- Kingdom: Animalia
- Phylum: Arthropoda
- Class: Insecta
- Order: Orthoptera
- Suborder: Caelifera
- Family: Acrididae
- Subfamily: Catantopinae
- Genus: Choroedocus; Bolívar, 1914

Synonyms
- Demodocus Stål, 1878

= Choroedocus =

Genus of grasshoppers

Choroedocus is a genus of grasshoppers in the subfamily Catantopinae, not assigned to any tribe. Species can be found in South Africa, India and Indo-China.

== Species ==
The Orthoptera Species File lists:

- Choroedocus capensis (Thunberg, 1815) - type species (as Gryllus capensis Thunberg)
- Choroedocus illustris (Walker, 1870)
- Choroedocus pallens Uvarov, 1933
- Choroedocus robustus (Serville, 1838)
- Choroedocus sparsus (Serville, 1838)
- Choroedocus violaceipes Miller, 1934
