= Toacris =

Scientific classification
- Domain: Eukaryota
- Kingdom: Animalia
- Phylum: Arthropoda
- Class: Insecta
- Order: Orthoptera
- Suborder: Caelifera
- Family: Acrididae
- Subfamily: Catantopinae
- Tribe: Tauchirini
- Genus: Toacris; Tinkham, 1940

Type species
- Toacris yaoshanensis Tinkham, 1940

Genus of grasshoppers

Toacris is a genus of grasshoppers in the family Acrididae, subfamily Catantopinae and tribe Tauchirini. Species have been recorded in southern China and Vietnam, but may also be present elsewhere in Indo-China.

== Species ==
The Orthoptera Species File and Catalogue of Life list:

- Toacris gorochovi Storozhenko, 1992
- Toacris nanlingensis Liu & Yin, 1988
- Toacris shaloshanensis Tinkham, 1940
- Toacris yaoshanensis Tinkham, 1940 - type species
