= Milleriana =

Scientific classification
- Domain: Eukaryota
- Kingdom: Animalia
- Phylum: Arthropoda
- Class: Insecta
- Order: Orthoptera
- Suborder: Caelifera
- Superfamily: Acridoidea
- Family: Acrididae
- Subfamily: Catantopinae
- Genus: Milleriana; Willemse, 1957

Genus of cricket-like animals

Milleriana is a monotypic genus of grasshoppers in the subfamily Catantopinae and tribe unassigned, containing the species M. brunnea Willemse, 1957, which can be found in Peninsular Malaysia.
