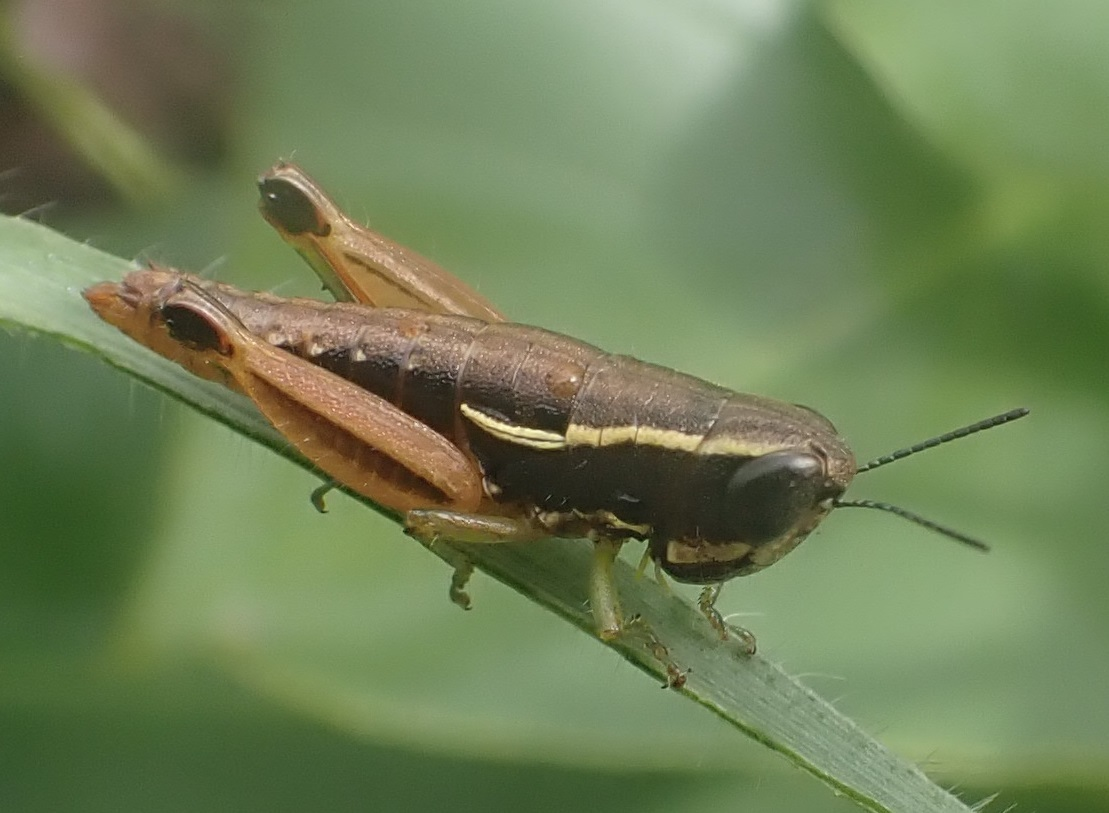

Scientific classification
- Kingdom: Animalia
- Phylum: Arthropoda
- Clade: Pancrustacea
- Class: Insecta
- Order: Orthoptera
- Suborder: Caelifera
- Family: Acrididae
- Subfamily: Catantopinae
- Tribe: Kakaduacridini; Key, 1993
- Genus: Kakaduacris; Key, 1992
- Species: K. minuta

Binomial name
- Kakaduacris minuta Key, 1992

= Kakaduacris =

Genus of grasshoppers

Kakaduacris minuta is a species of short-horned grasshopper in the family Acrididae. It is the only species in the genus Kakaduacris. It is found in north Australian savannas.

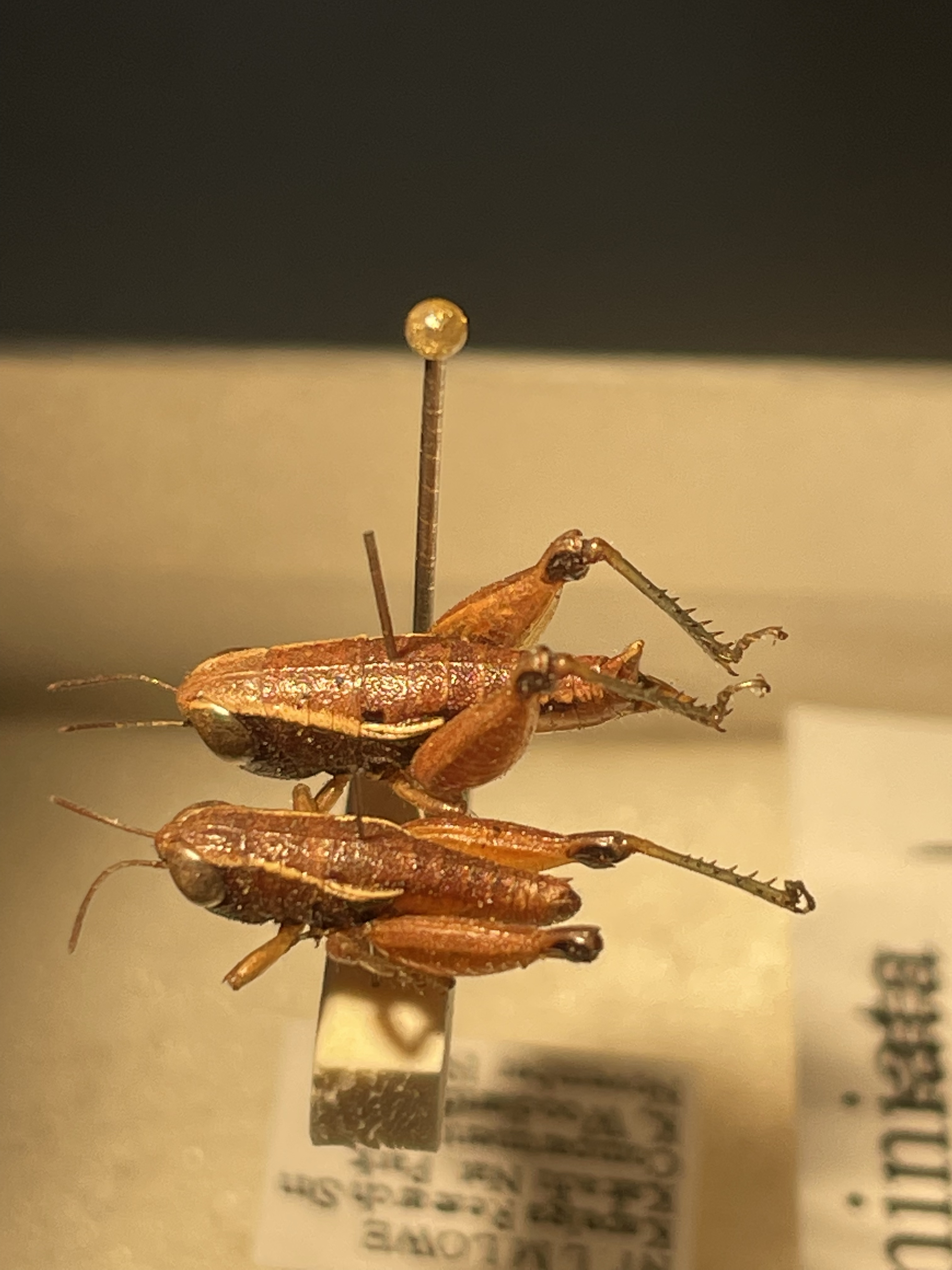

It is a diurnal species, very small in size. Adult females are approximately 12mm in length and adult males 9mm.
