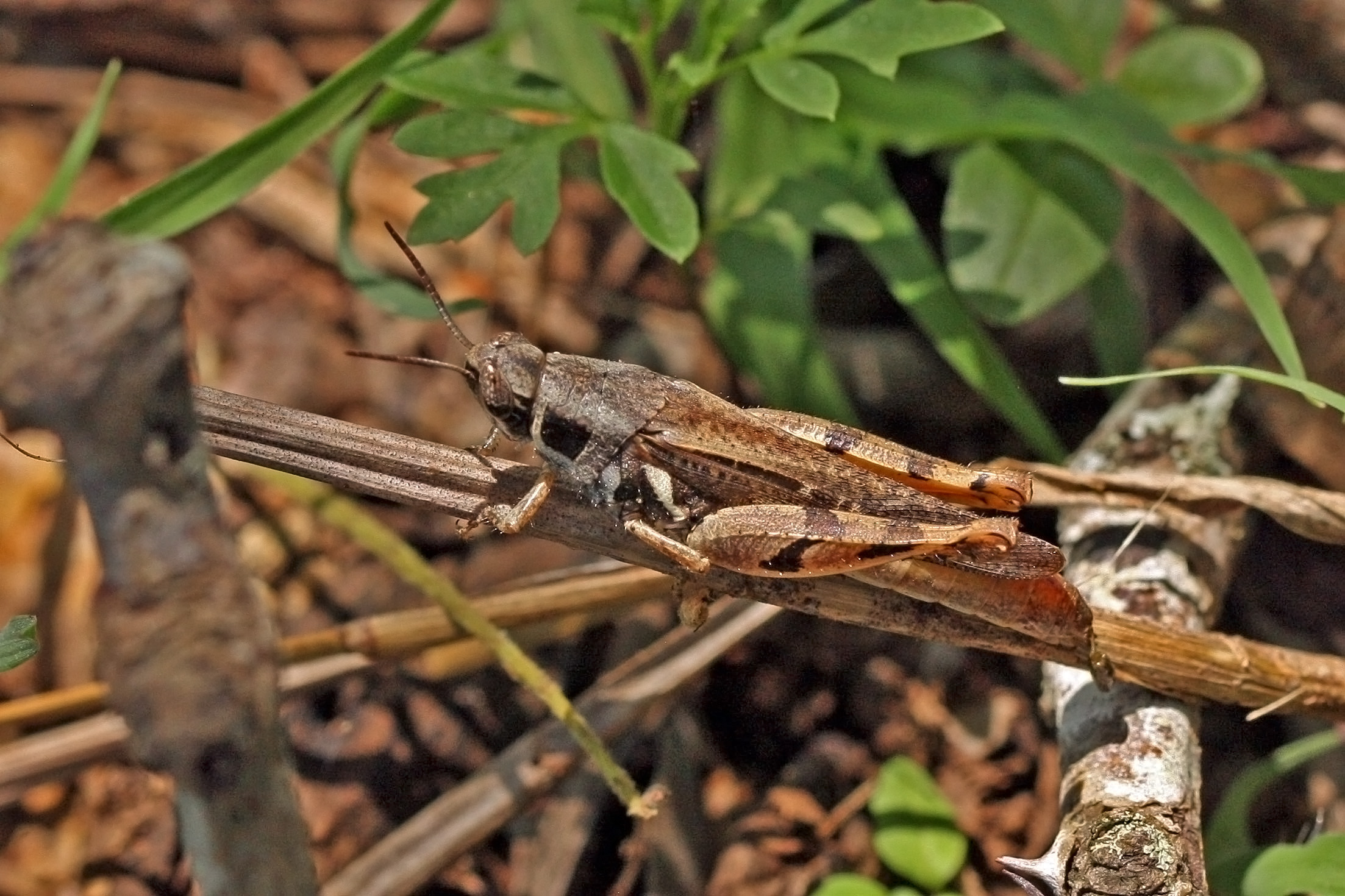
- Catantops humeralis: South Africa

Scientific classification
- Kingdom: Animalia
- Phylum: Arthropoda
- Clade: Pancrustacea
- Class: Insecta
- Order: Orthoptera
- Suborder: Caelifera
- Family: Acrididae
- Subfamily: Catantopinae; Brunner von Wattenwyl, 1893

Tribes
- See text

= Catantopinae =

Subfamily of grasshoppers

The subfamily Catantopinae is a group of insects classified under family Acrididae. Genera such as Macrotona may sometimes called "spur-throated grasshoppers", but that name is also used for grasshoppers from other subfamilies, including the genus Melanoplus from the Melanoplinae.

== Tribes and selected genera ==
=== Tribes A-D ===
- Allagini - Eastern Africa, including Madagascar
1. Allaga Karsch, 1896
2. Sauracris Burr, 1900
- Apoboleini - Africa, Indo-China
1. Apoboleus Karsch, 1891
2. Pseudophialosphera Dirsh, 1952
3. Squamobibracte Ingrisch, 1989

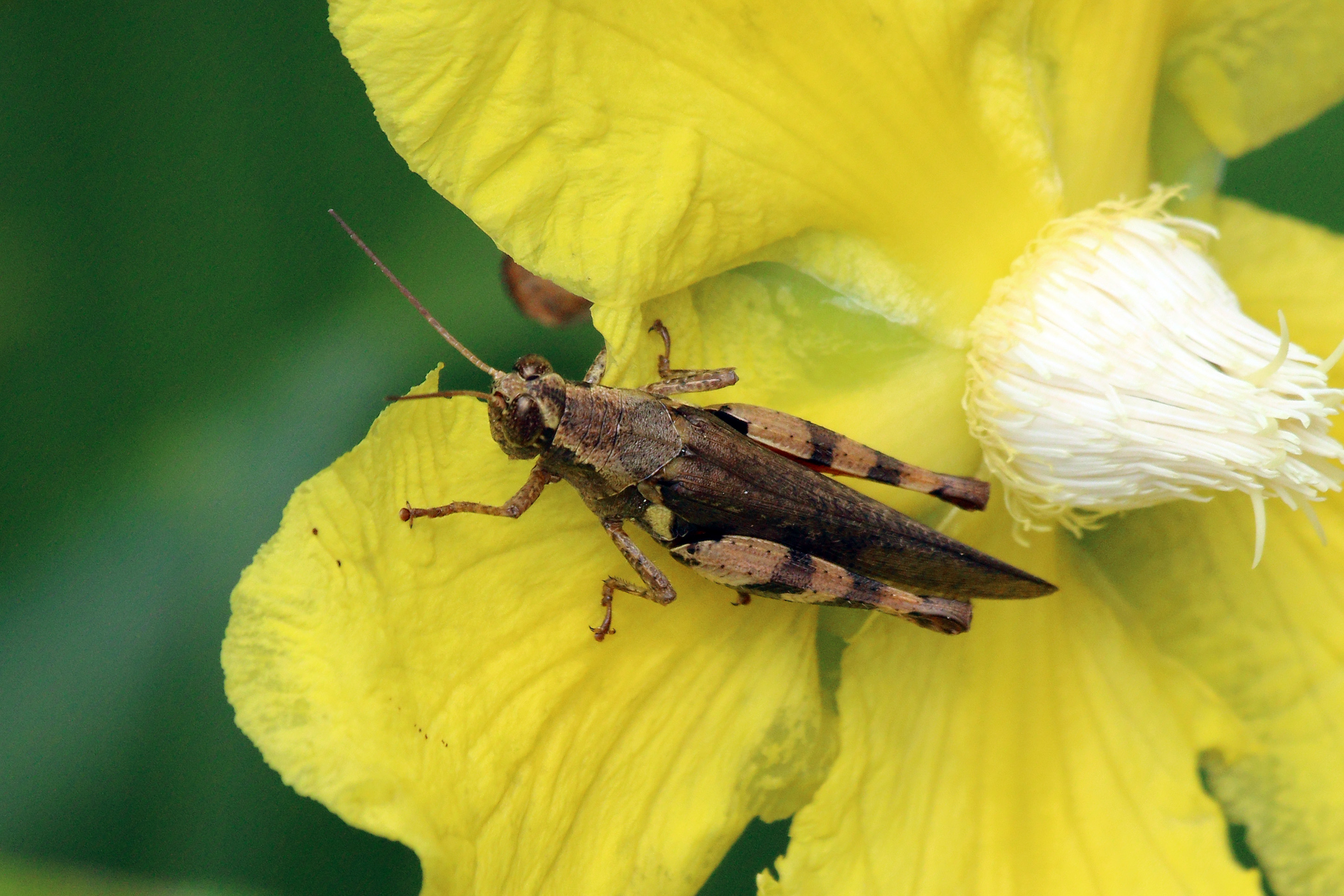
Xenocatantops humilis: Borneo

- Catantopini - Africa, Asia, Australia
  many: see tribe page - including:
  - Catantops Schaum, 1853
  - Diabolocatantops Jago, 1984
  - Macrotona Brunner von Wattenwyl, 1893
  - Stenocatantops Dirsh, 1953
  - Xenocatantops Dirsh, 1953
- Diexiini - Western Asia
1. Bufonacridella Adelung, 1910
2. Diexis Zubovski, 1899

=== Gereniini ===
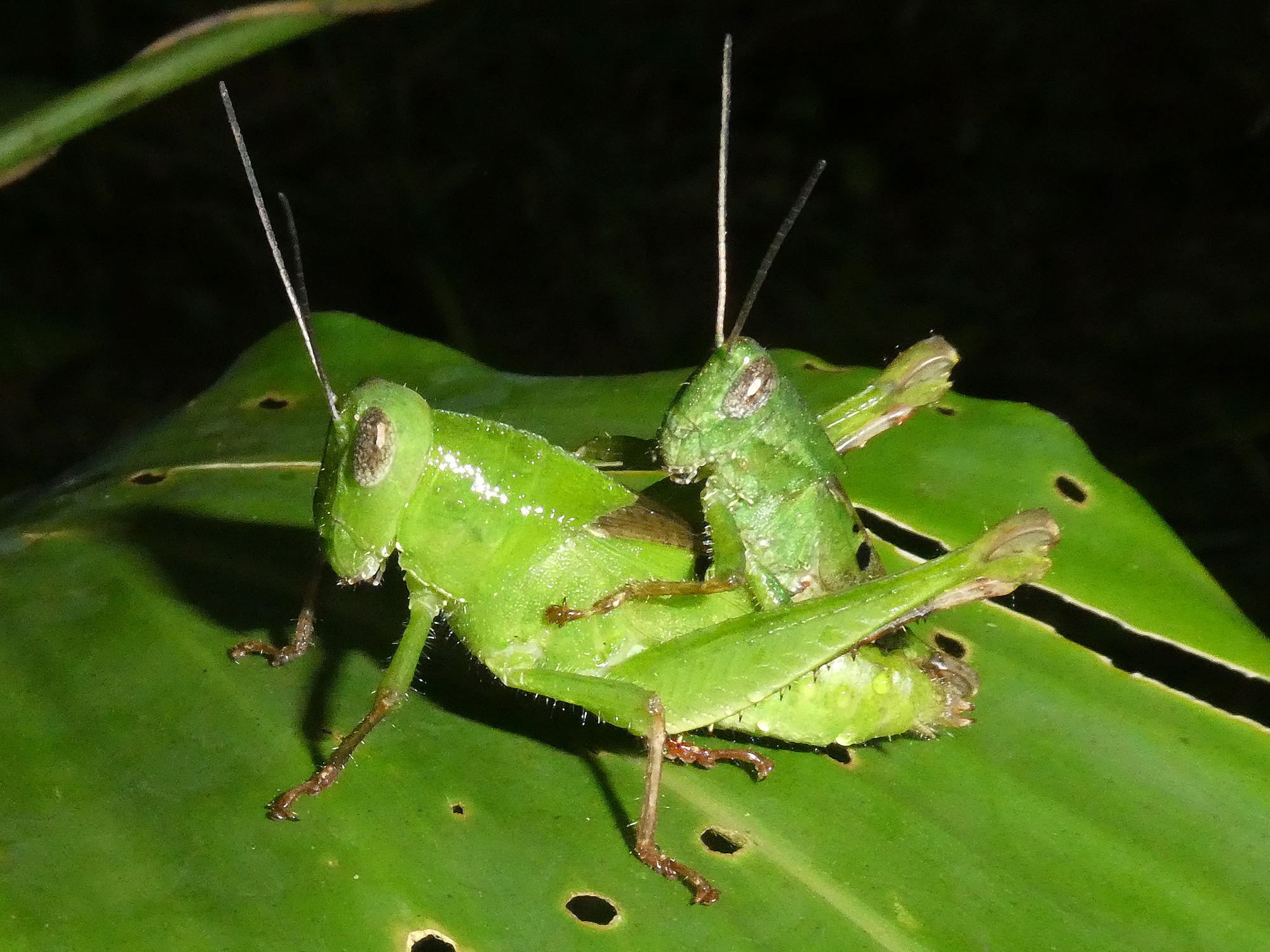
Gerenia sp., Vietnam

Distribution: India, Indo-China

1. Anacranae Miller, 1934
2. Anasedulia - monotypic - A. maejophrae Dawwrueng, Storozhenko & Asanok, 2015 (Thailand)
3. Bibractella Storozhenko, 2002 - monotypic
4. Gerenia Stål, 1878
5. Leosedulia - monotypic - L. mistshenkoi Storozhenko, 2009

=== Mesambriini ===
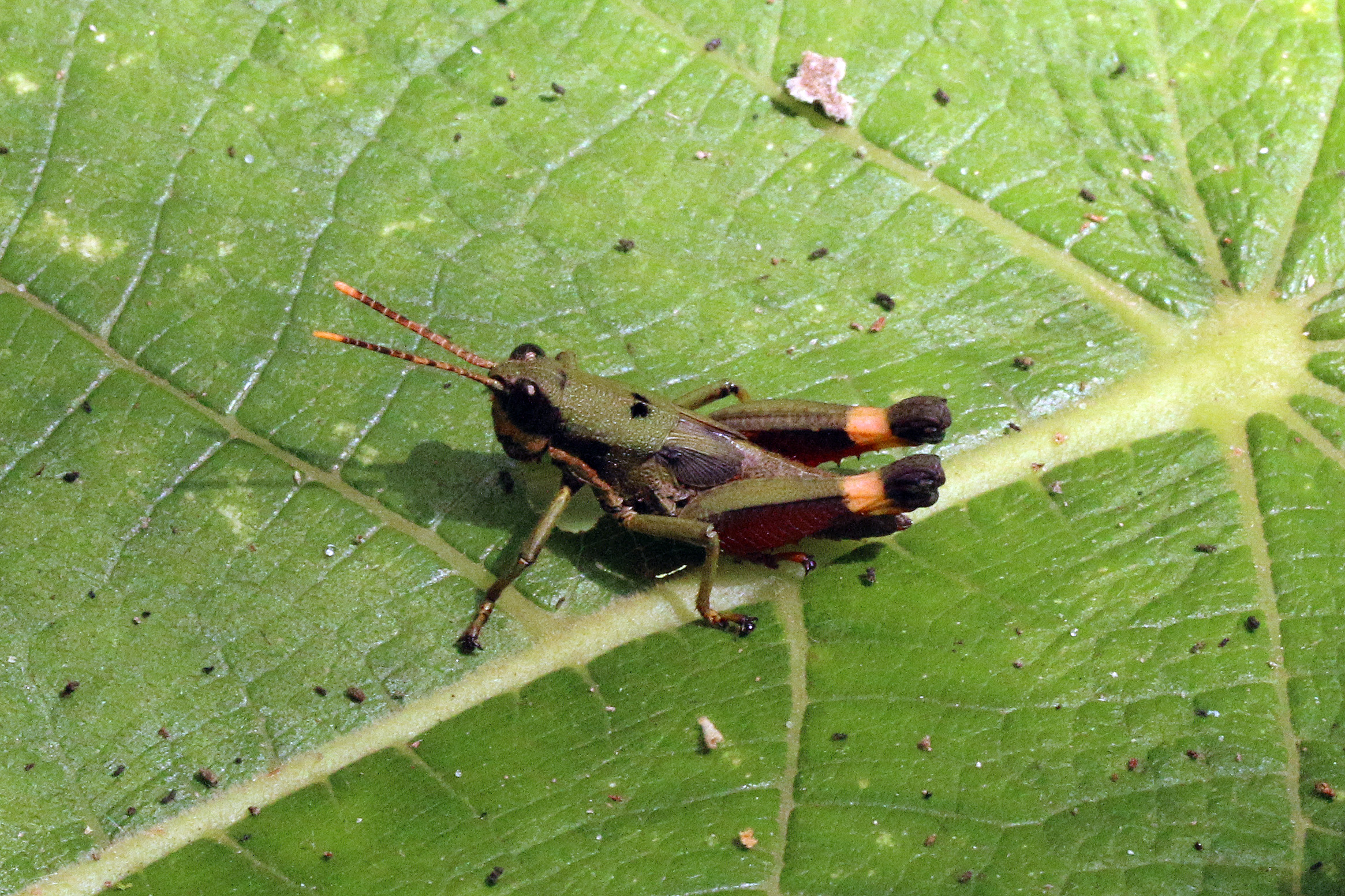
Traulia azureipennis brown form nymph: Borneo

Auth. Brunner von Wattenwyl, 1893; distribution: Madagascar, India, East Asia

1. Celebesia Bolívar, 1917
2. Mesambria (insect) Stål, 1878
3. Pyrgophistes - monotypic - Pyrgophistes chinnicki Key, 1992
4. Ranacris You & Lin, 1983
5. Traulia Stål, 1873

=== Tribes H-P ===
- Histrioacridini - Australia
  - Histrioacrida Sjöstedt, 1930
  - Scurra Key, 1992
- Kakaduacridini - Australia
  - Kakaduacris Key, 1992
- Merehanini - Eastern Africa
  - Merehana Kevan, 1957
- Oxyrrhepini - Sri Lanka, China, Indo-China, Malesia
  - Oxyrrhepes Stål, 1873
- Paraconophymatini - Western Asia to India
  - Paraconophyma Uvarov, 1921

=== Tauchirini ===
Distribution: South-East Asia

- Chapacris Tinkham, 1940
- Tauchira Stål, 1878
- Toacris Tinkham, 1940

=== Tribes U-Z ===
- Urnisiellini - Australia
  - Urnisiella Sjöstedt, 1930
- Uvaroviini - Western Asia
  - Uvarovium Dirsh, 1927
- Wiltshirellini Shumakov, 1963 - Middle East
  - Wiltshirella - monotypic W. fusiformis Popov, 1951
- Xenacanthippini - China, Peninsular Malaysia
  - Xenacanthippus Miller, 1934

=== genus group Serpusiae ===
Auth.: Johnston, 1956; distribution: tropical Africa including Madagascar

- Aresceutica Karsch, 1896
- Auloserpusia Rehn, 1914
- Coenona Karsch, 1896
- Pteropera Karsch, 1891
- Segellia Karsch, 1891
- Serpusia Karsch, 1891
- Serpusilla Ramme, 1931

=== incertae sedis ===
Many other genera are not yet assigned to tribes.

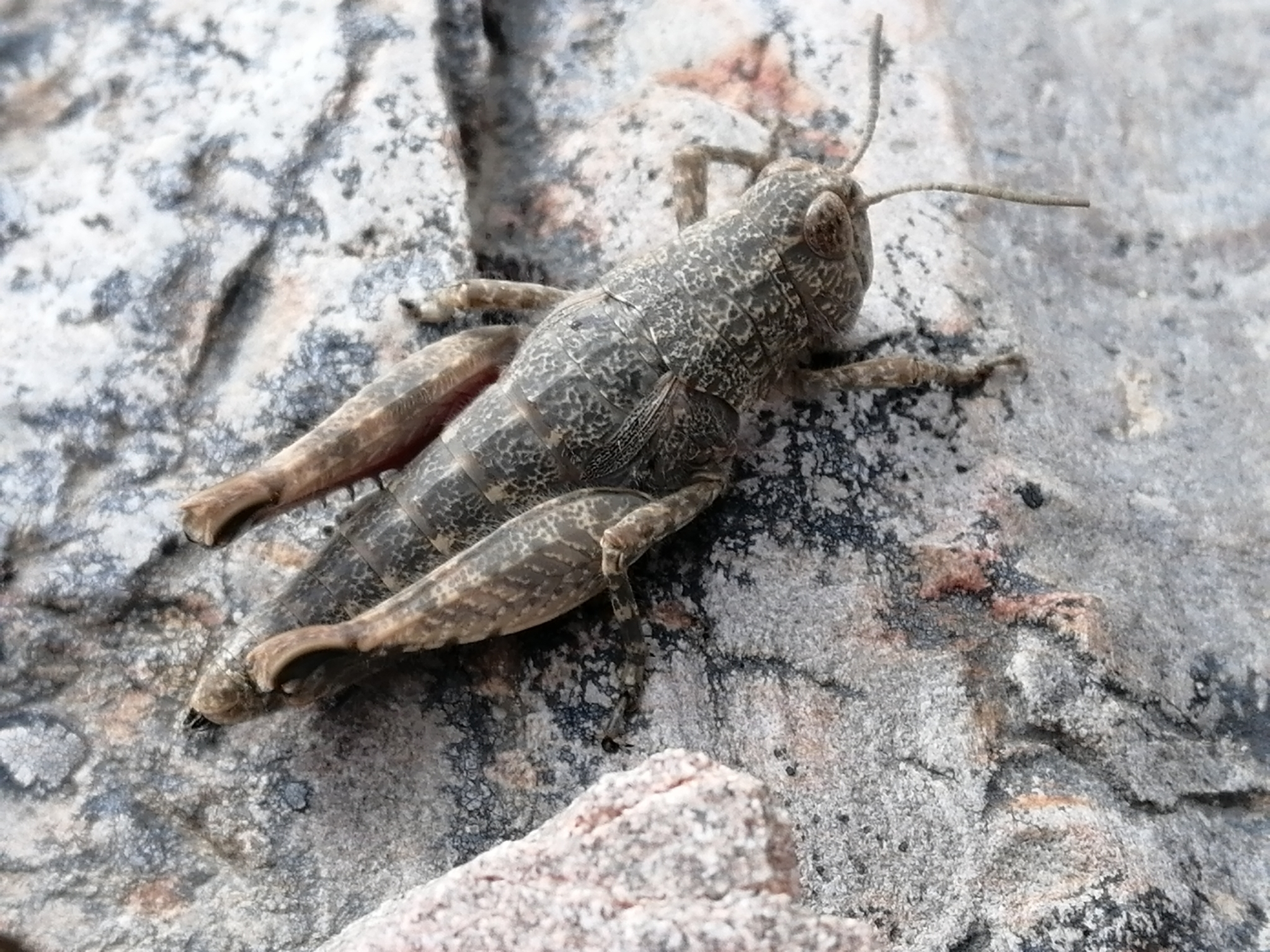
Brachaspis nivalis, New Zealand

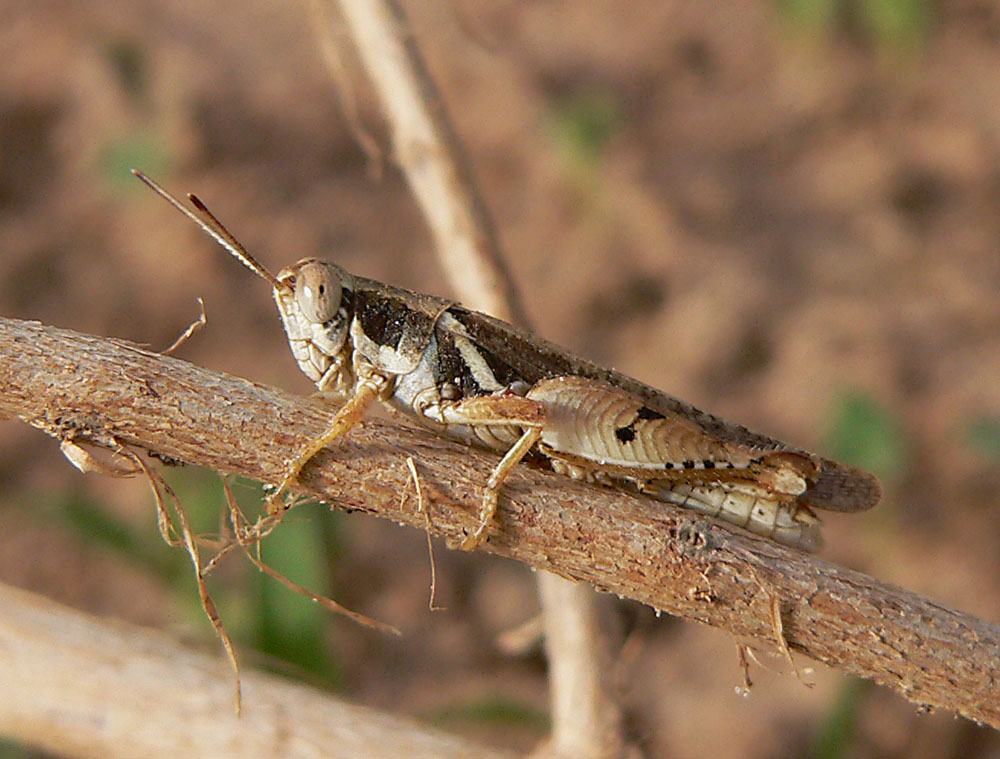
Male Cryptocatantops haemorrhoidalis: Senegal

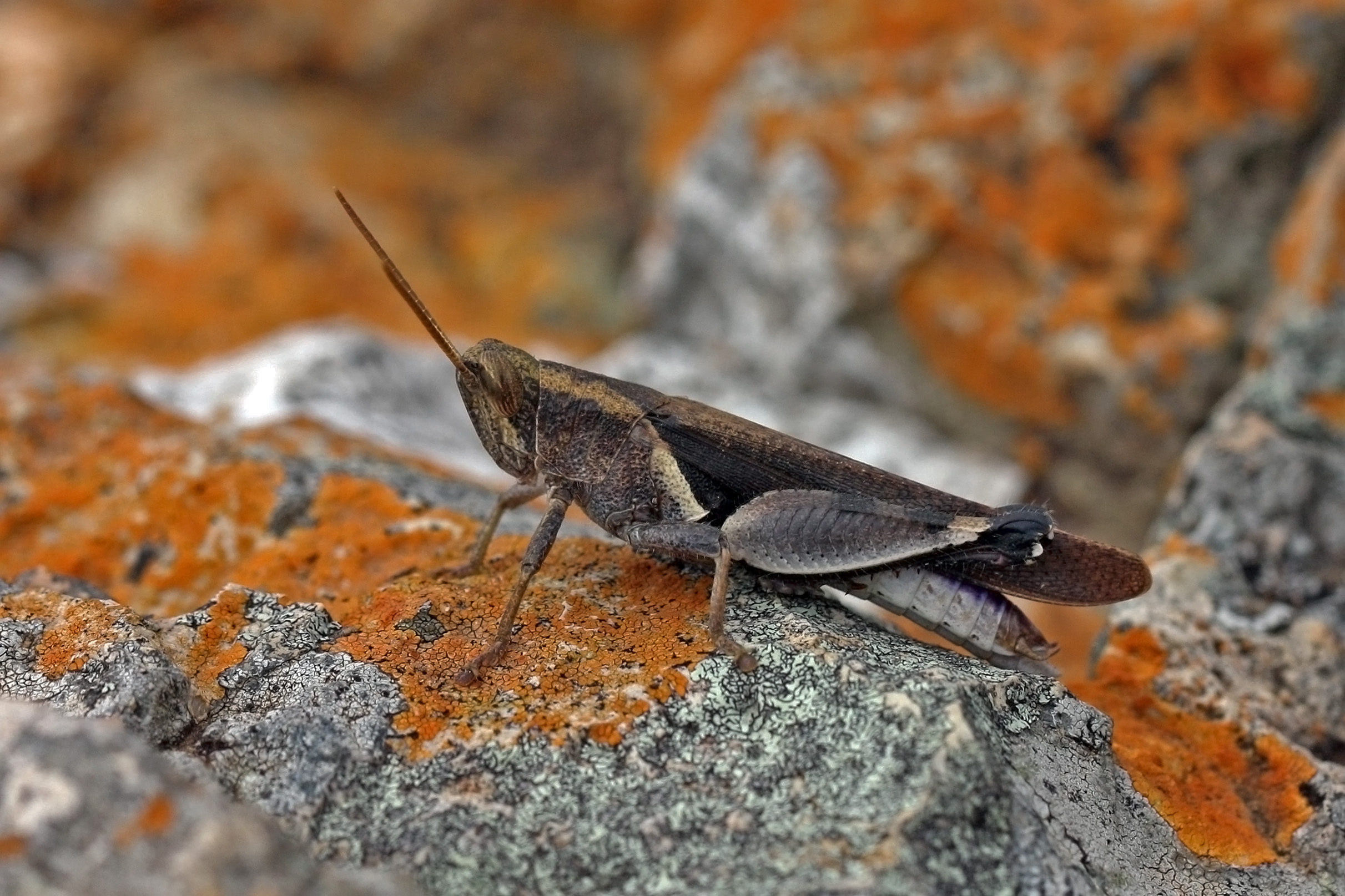
Oxycatantops spissus: South Africa

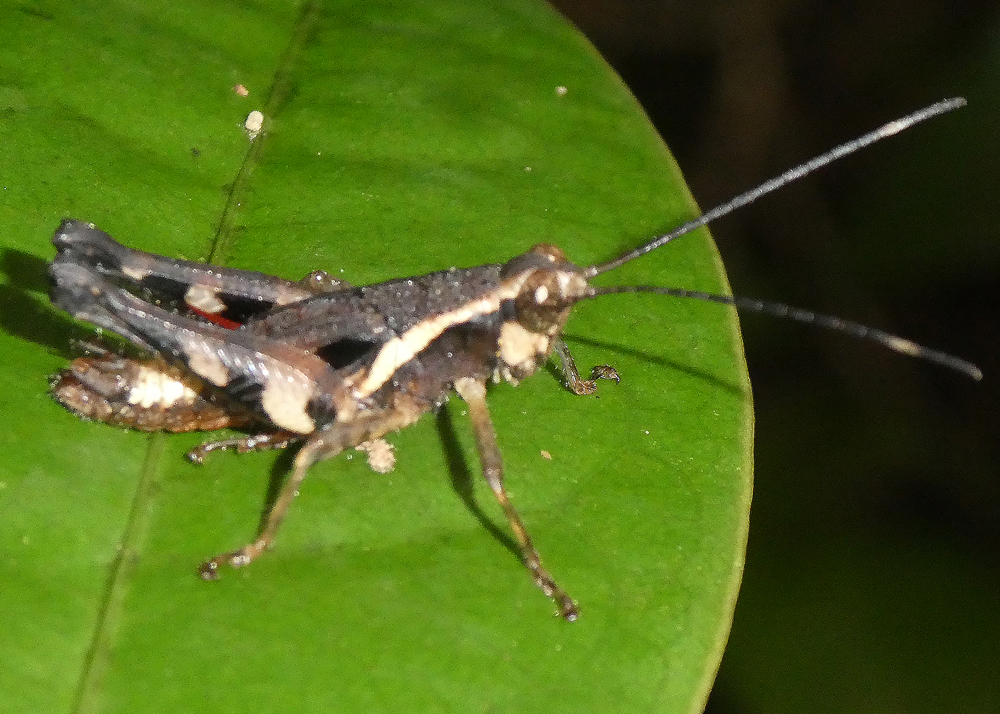
Striatosedulia cf. cattiensis
1. Abisares Stål, 1878
2. Allotriusia Karsch, 1896
3. Alpinacris Bigelow, 1967
4. Alulacris Zheng, 1981
5. Alulacroides Zheng, Dong & Xu, 2010
6. Ambrea Dirsh, 1962
7. Amismizia Bolívar, 1914
8. Anapropacris Uvarov, 1953
9. Angolacris Dirsh, 1962
10. Anischnansis Dirsh, 1959
11. Anomalocatantops Jago, 1984
12. Anthermus Stål, 1878
13. Antita Bolívar, 1908
14. Apalniacris Ingrisch, Willemse & Shishodia, 2004
15. Arminda Krauss, 1892
16. Assamacris Uvarov, 1942
17. Bacuita Strand, 1932
18. Bambusacris Henry, 1933
19. Bannacris Zheng, 1980
20. Barombia Karsch, 1891
21. Beybienkoacris Storozhenko, 2005
22. Bhutanacridella Willemse, 1962
23. Bibracte Stål, 1878
24. Binaluacris Willemse, 1932
25. Brachaspis Hutton, 1898
26. Brachycatantops Dirsh, 1953
27. Brachyelytracris Baehr, 1992
28. Brownacris Dirsh, 1958
29. Bumacris Willemse, 1931
30. Burmacris Uvarov, 1942
31. Burttia Dirsh, 1951
32. Calderonia Bolívar, 1908
33. Callicatantops Uvarov, 1953
34. Cardeniopsis Dirsh, 1955
35. Cardenius Bolívar, 1911
36. Carsula Stål, 1878
37. Caryandoides Zheng & Xie, 2007
  - synonym Yinia Liu & Li, 1995
38. Carydana Bolívar, 1918 - monotypic Carydana agomena (Karsch, 1896)
39. Cerechta Bolívar, 1922
40. Choroedocus Bolívar, 1914
41. Chromophialosphera Descamps & Donskoff, 1968
42. Cingalia Ramme, 1941
43. Circocephalus Willemse, 1928
44. Coloracris Willemse, 1938
45. Coniocara Henry, 1940
46. Criotocatantops Jago, 1984
47. Crobylostenus Ramme, 1929
48. Cryptocatantops Jago, 1984
49. Cylindracris Descamps & Wintrebert, 1967
50. Deliacris Ramme, 1941
51. Dendrocatantops Descamps & Wintrebert, 1966
52. Descampsilla Wintrebert, 1972
53. Digrammacris Jago, 1984
54. Dioscoridus Popov, 1957
55. Dirshilla Wintrebert, 1972
56. Dubitacris Henry, 1937
57. Duplessisia Dirsh, 1956
58. Duviardia Donskoff, 1985
59. Eliya Uvarov, 1927
60. Enoplotettix Bolívar, 1913
61. Epacrocatantops Jago, 1984
62. Eritrichius Bolívar, 1898
63. Eubocoana Sjöstedt, 1931
64. Eupreponotus Uvarov, 1921
65. Eupropacris Walker, 1870
66. Exopropacris Dirsh, 1951
67. Frontifissia Key, 1937
68. Gemeneta Karsch, 1892
69. Genimenoides Henry, 1934
70. Gerunda (insect) Bolívar, 1918
71. Guineacris Ramme, 1941
72. Hadrolecocatantops Jago, 1984
73. Harantacris Wintrebert, 1972
74. Harpezocatantops Jago, 1984
75. Hebridea Willemse, 1926
76. Heinrichius Ramme, 1941
77. Ikonnikovia Bey-Bienko, 1935
78. Indomesambria Ingrisch, 2006
79. Ischnansis Karsch, 1896
80. Ixalidium Gerstaecker, 1869
81. Javanacris Willemse, 1955
82. Kinangopa Uvarov, 1938
83. Kwidschwia Rehn, 1914
84. Lefroya Kirby, 1914
85. Longchuanacris Zheng & Fu, 1989
86. Maculacris Willemse, 1932
87. Madimbania Dirsh, 1953
88. Maga (insect) Bolívar, 1918
89. Magaella Willemse, 1974
90. Malua (insect) Ramme, 1941
91. Mananara (insect) Dirsh, 1962
92. Mayottea Rehn, 1959
93. Mazaea (insect) Stål, 1876
94. Melicodes Uvarov, 1923
95. Melinocatantops Jago, 1984
96. Meltripata Bolívar, 1923
97. Micronacris Willemse, 1957
98. Milleriana - monotypic Milleriana brunnea Willemse, 1957
99. Moessonia Willemse, 1922
100. Molucola Bolívar, 1915
101. Mopla Henry, 1940
102. Naraikadua Henry, 1940
103. Nathanacris Willemse & Ingrisch, 2004
104. Navasia Kirby, 1914 - monotypic
105. Noliba Bolívar, 1922
106. Oenocatantops Dirsh, 1953
107. Opharicus Uvarov, 1940
108. Orthocephalum Willemse, 1921
109. Oshwea Ramme, 1929
110. Oxycardenius Uvarov, 1953
111. Oxycatantops Dirsh, 1953
112. Pachycatantops Dirsh, 1953
113. Pagdenia Miller, 1934
114. Palniacris Henry, 1940
115. Paprides Hutton, 1898
116. Paracardenius Bolívar, 1912
117. Paracaryanda Willemse, 1955
118. Parahysiella Wintrebert, 1972
119. Paramesambria Willemse, 1957
120. Paraperineta Descamps & Wintrebert, 1967
121. Parapropacris Ramme, 1929
122. Paraserpusilla Dirsh, 1962
123. Parastenocrobylus Willemse, 1921
124. Paratoacris Li & Jin, 1984
125. Paraxenotettix Dirsh, 1961
126. Pareuthymia Willemse, 1930
127. Peitharchicus Brunner von Wattenwyl, 1898
128. Pelecinotus Bolívar, 1902
129. Perakia Ramme, 1929
130. Perineta Dirsh, 1962
131. Pezocatantops Dirsh, 1953
132. Platycatantops Baccetti, 1985
133. Platycercacris Zheng & Shi, 2001
134. Pododula Karsch, 1896
135. Pseudofinotina Dirsh, 1962
136. Pseudogerunda Bey-Bienko, 1935
137. Pseudohysiella Dirsh, 1962
138. Pteroperina Ramme, 1929
139. Pyramisternum Huang, 1983
140. Racilia Stål, 1878
141. Racilidea Bolívar, 1918
142. Rugulacris Zheng & Wei, 2007
143. Salinacris Willemse, 1957
144. Sedulia Stål, 1878
145. Serpusiacris Descamps & Wintrebert, 1967
146. Serpusiformia Dirsh, 1966
147. Seyrigacris Bolívar, 1932
148. Shennongipodisma Zhong & Zheng, 2004
149. Siamacris Willemse, 1955
150. Siebersia Willemse, 1933
151. Sinopodismoides Gong, Zheng & Lian, 1995
152. Sphaerocranae Willemse, 1972
153. Staurocleis Uvarov, 1923
154. Striatosedulia Ingrisch, 1989
155. Strombocardeniopsis Jago, 1984
156. Sygrus Bolívar, 1889
157. Tangana Ramme, 1929
158. Tarbaleus Brunner von Wattenwyl, 1898
159. Tauchiridea Bolívar, 1918
160. Thymiacris Willemse, 1937
161. Tinnevellia Henry, 1940
162. Tonkinacrisoides monotypic T. guangxiensis Zheng & Wei, 2007
163. Traulacris Willemse, 1933
164. Triodicolacris Baehr, 1992
165. Tuberofera Willemse, 1930
166. Tunstallops Jago, 1984
167. Utanacris Miller, 1934
168. Uvarovacris Rehn, 1944
169. Veseyacris Dirsh, 1959
170. Visayia Rehn, 1944
171. Vitticatantops Sjöstedt, 1931
172. Vohemara Dirsh, 1966
173. Xenotettix Uvarov, 1925
174. Zeylanacris Rehn, 1944
