= Anasedulia =

Scientific classification
- Domain: Eukaryota
- Kingdom: Animalia
- Phylum: Arthropoda
- Class: Insecta
- Order: Orthoptera
- Suborder: Caelifera
- Family: Acrididae
- Subfamily: Catantopinae
- Tribe: Gereniini
- Genus: Anasedulia; Dawwrueng, Storozhenko & Asanok, 2015
- Species: A. maejophrae

Binomial name
- Anasedulia maejophrae Dawwrueng, Storozhenko & Asanok, 2015

Genus of grasshoppers

Anasedulia is a monotypic genus of grasshoppers in the subfamily Catantopinae and tribe Gereniini. The single species to date, Anasedulia maejophrae, has been found in Indo-China (Thailand).
