= Leosedulia =

Scientific classification
- Domain: Eukaryota
- Kingdom: Animalia
- Phylum: Arthropoda
- Class: Insecta
- Order: Orthoptera
- Suborder: Caelifera
- Family: Acrididae
- Subfamily: Catantopinae
- Tribe: Gereniini
- Genus: Leosedulia; Storozhenko, 2009
- Species: L. mistshenkoi

Binomial name
- Leosedulia mistshenkoi Storozhenko, 2009

Genus of grasshoppers

Leosedulia is a monotypic genus of grasshoppers in the subfamily Catantopinae and tribe Gereniini. The single species, Leosedulia mistshenkoi, has been found in Indo-China (Cambodia).
