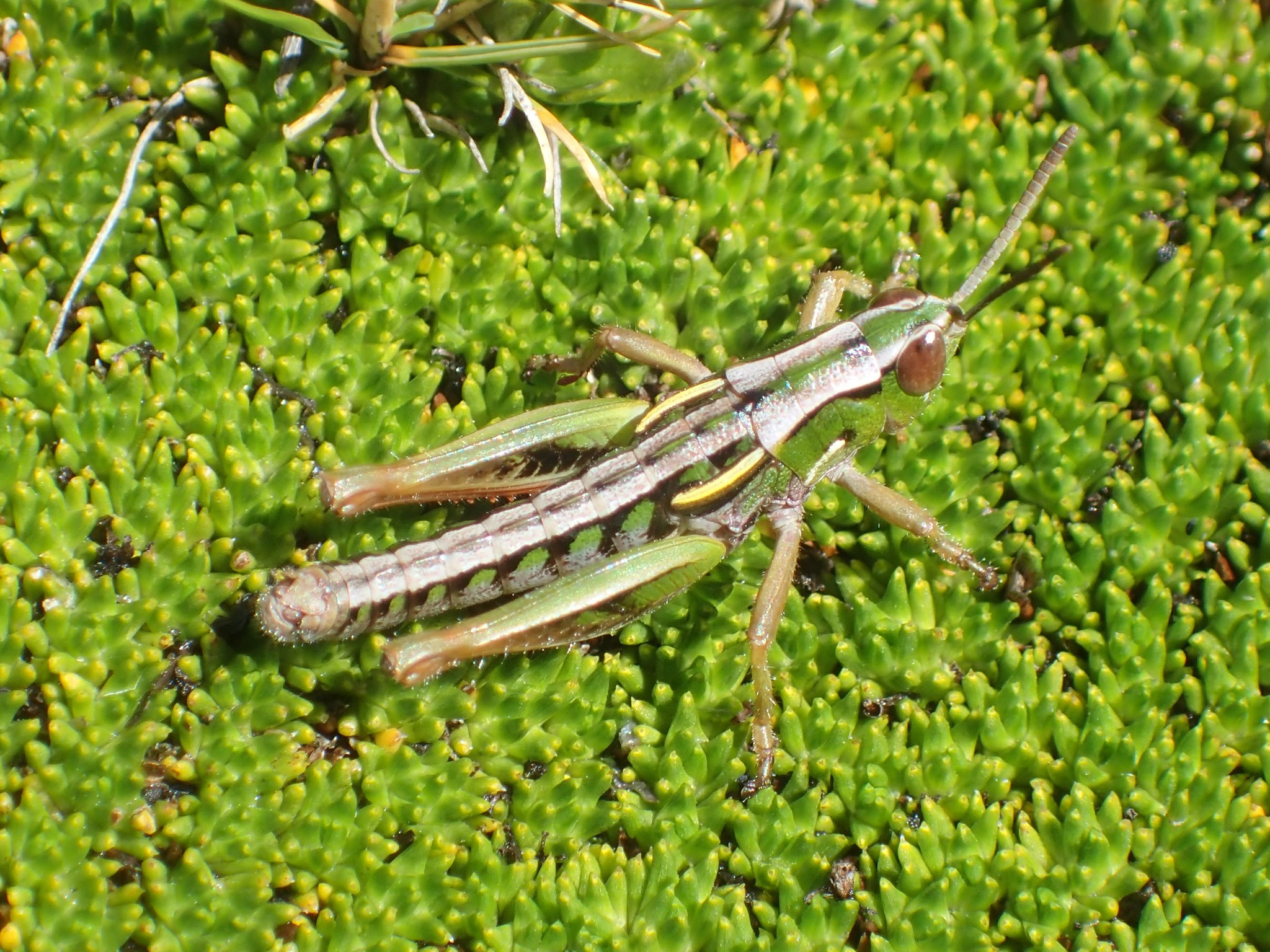
- In Australia

Scientific classification
- Kingdom: Animalia
- Phylum: Arthropoda
- Clade: Pancrustacea
- Class: Insecta
- Order: Orthoptera
- Suborder: Caelifera
- Family: Acrididae
- Subfamily: Catantopinae
- Tribe: Catantopini
- Genus: Russalpia
- Species: R. albertisi

Binomial name
- Russalpia albertisi (Bolívar, 1898)
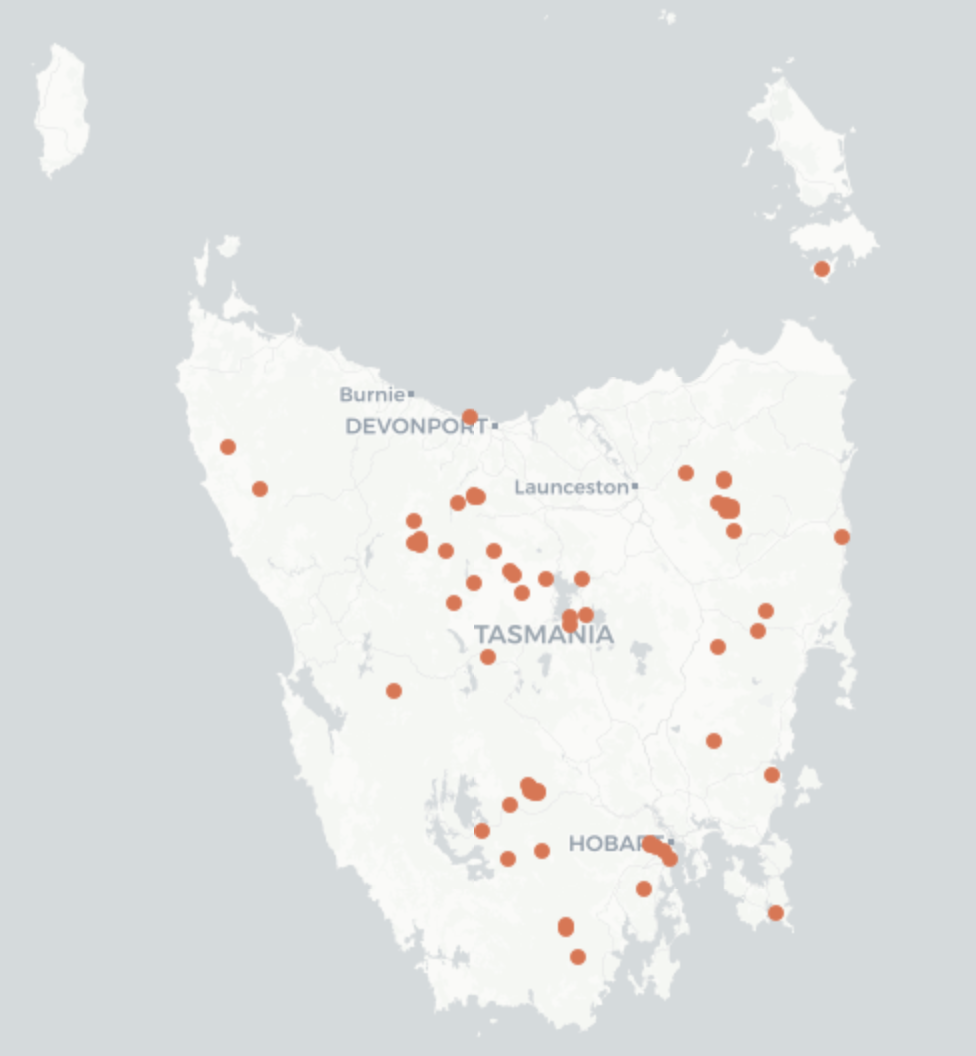

= Russalpia albertisi =

Species of short-horned grasshopper

Russalpia albertisi, the Tassie hopper, is a species of short-horned grasshopper in the family Acrididae. It is found in Tasmania, Australia.

== Description ==
Russalpia albertisi is distinguished from other species by its micropterous wings, with small, non-functional forewings and vestigial hind wings. Its pronotum features a smooth median carina and a well-defined caudal margin. Males typically have more inflated hind femora, while females tend to have slender femora and a slightly larger, more robust abdomen, as is common in many grasshopper species. The colouration of R. albertisi varies widely, with individuals appearing in shades of green, brown, or black, providing effective camouflage in Tasmanian grasslands.

== Taxonomy ==
Originally described as Trigoniza albertisi by Bolívar in 1898, the species was later reclassified into the genus Russalpia by Sjöstedt in 1921. Phylogenetic studies confirmed a close relationship between Russalpia and the New Zealand Sigaus genus, suggesting a shared evolutionary history between Tasmanian and New Zealand alpine grasshoppers. Molecular analyses, including mitochondrial and nuclear DNA sequencing, have placed R. albertisi within the subtribe Russalpiina, a group restricted to Tasmania and New Zealand.

== Distribution and habitat ==
Endemic to Tasmania, Russalpia albertisi is found mainly in grassland and open woodland habitats, primarily in the Tasmanian Wilderness World Heritage Area. The species has been observed at a range of altitudes, however particularly thrives in buttongrass moorlands and montane regions.

== Ecology and behaviour ==
Russalpia albertisi is a herbivorous species, feeding on native perennial grasses and small herbaceous plants, similar to other grasshoppers in its ecological niche. Sightings and specimen collections suggest that R. albertisi is most active during the warmer months of spring and early summer, when vegetation is abundant and conditions are favourable. Unlike many grasshopper species, R. albertisi does not produce stridulatory sounds for communication or mate attraction. Instead they rely on other behavioural cues for intraspecific interactions. R. albertisi follows a life cycle similar to other acrididae, laying eggs in soil or vegetation and nymphs developing through multiple molts before reaching adulthood.
