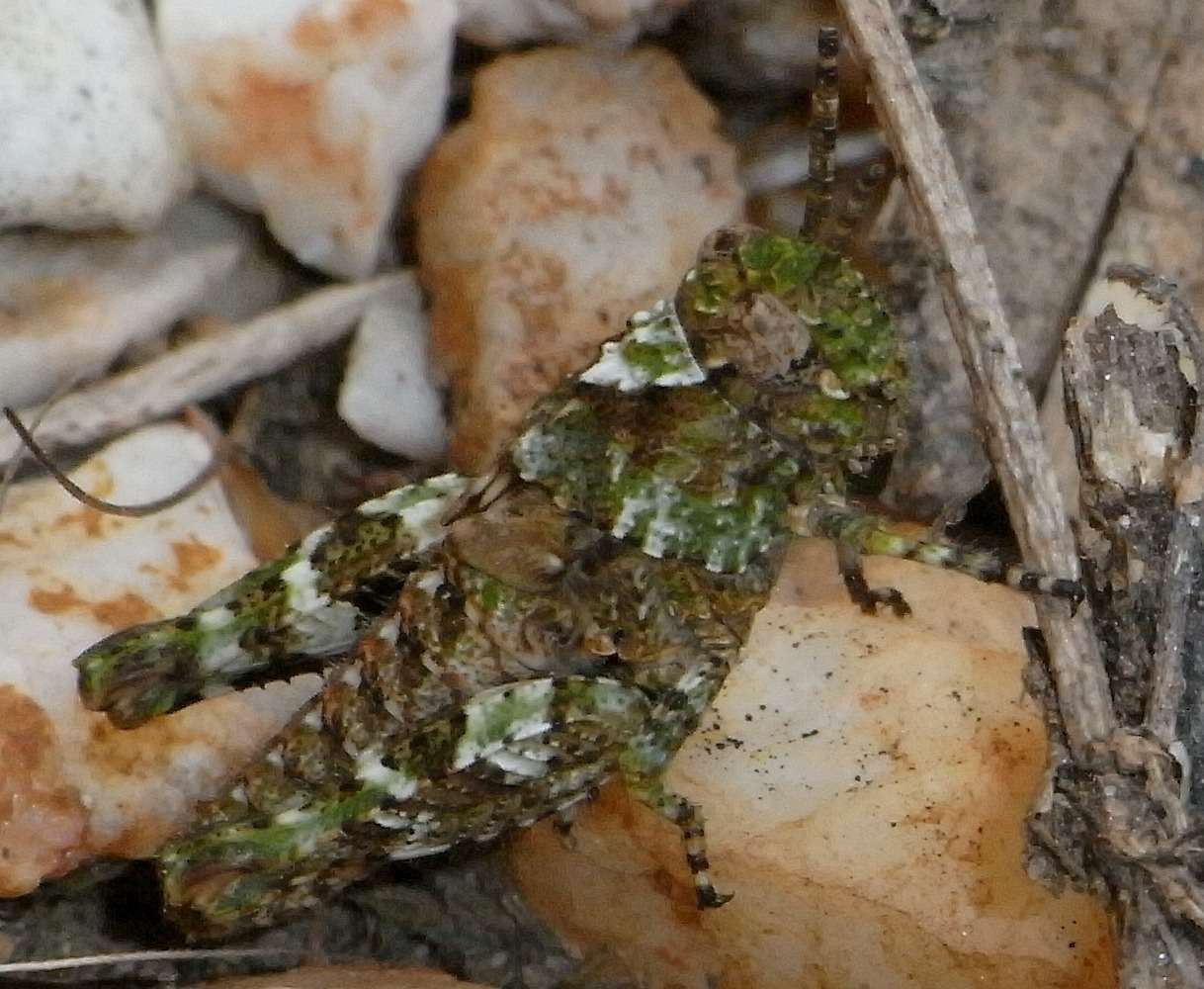
- Cirphula pyrrhocnemis, Variable Cirphula, Australia

Scientific classification
- Kingdom: Animalia
- Phylum: Arthropoda
- Clade: Pancrustacea
- Class: Insecta
- Order: Orthoptera
- Suborder: Caelifera
- Family: Acrididae
- Subfamily: Catantopinae
- Tribe: Catantopini
- Subtribe: Cirphulina
- Genus: Cirphula
- Species: C. pyrrhocnemis

Binomial name
- Cirphula pyrrhocnemis (Stål, 1861)

= Cirphula pyrrhocnemis =

Species of short-horned grasshopper

Cirphula pyrrhocnemis, the Variable Cirphula, is a species of short-horned grasshopper in the family Acrididae. It is found in southeastern Australia.
