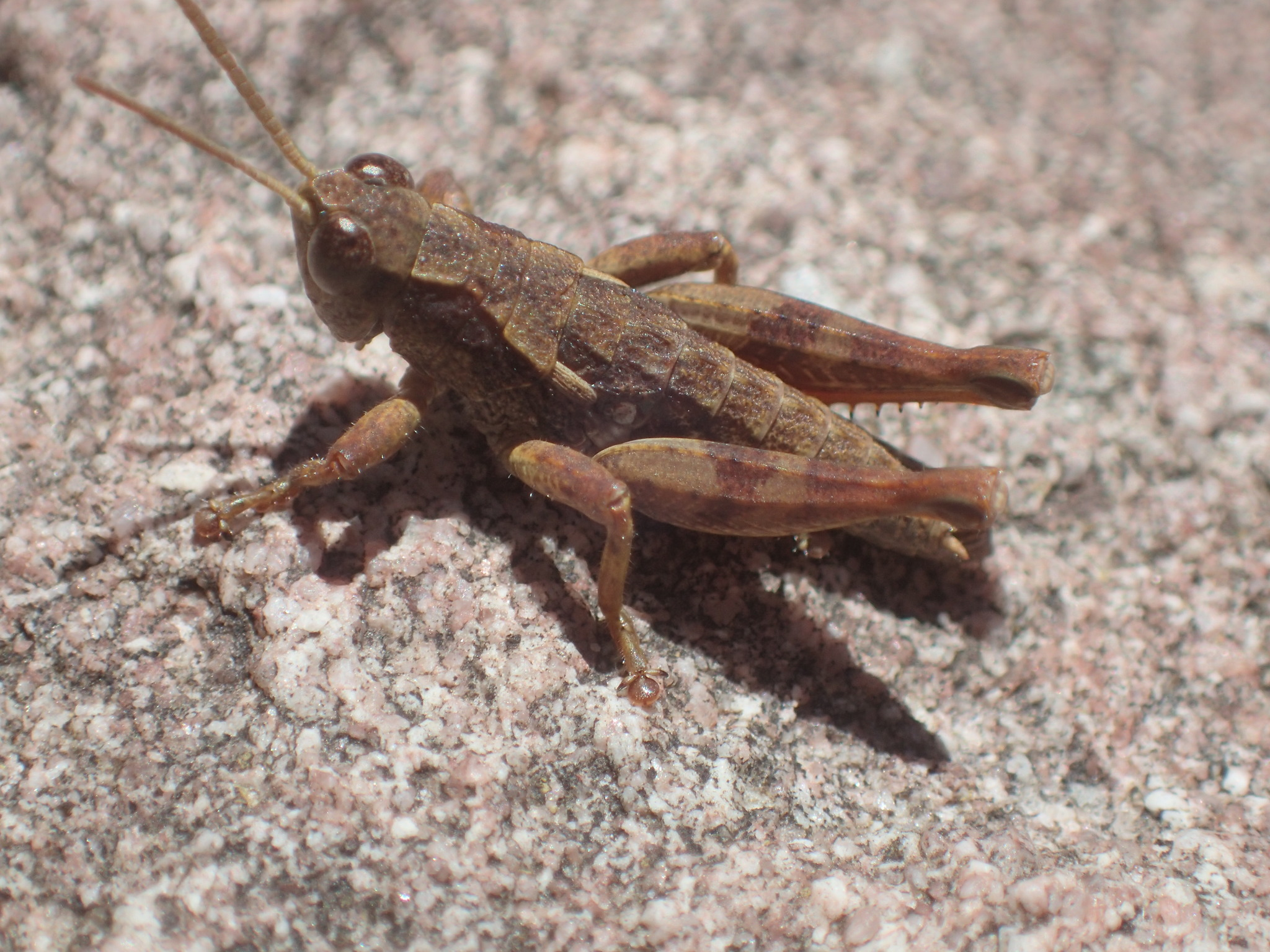
- Tasmaniacris tasmaniensis, Tasmanian Grasshopper, Tasmania, Australia

Scientific classification
- Kingdom: Animalia
- Phylum: Arthropoda
- Clade: Pancrustacea
- Class: Insecta
- Order: Orthoptera
- Suborder: Caelifera
- Family: Acrididae
- Tribe: Catantopini
- Subtribe: Russalpiina
- Genus: Tasmaniacris; Sjöstedt, 1932
- Species: T. tasmaniensis

Binomial name
- Tasmaniacris tasmaniensis (Bolívar, 1898)

= Tasmaniacris =

Genus of grasshoppers

Tasmaniacris is a genus of short-horned grasshoppers in the family Acrididae. There is one described species in Tasmaniacris, T. tasmaniensis, found in Tasmania. This grasshopper is flightless (micropterous). T. tasmaniensis is sister to the Tasmanian Russalpia species.
