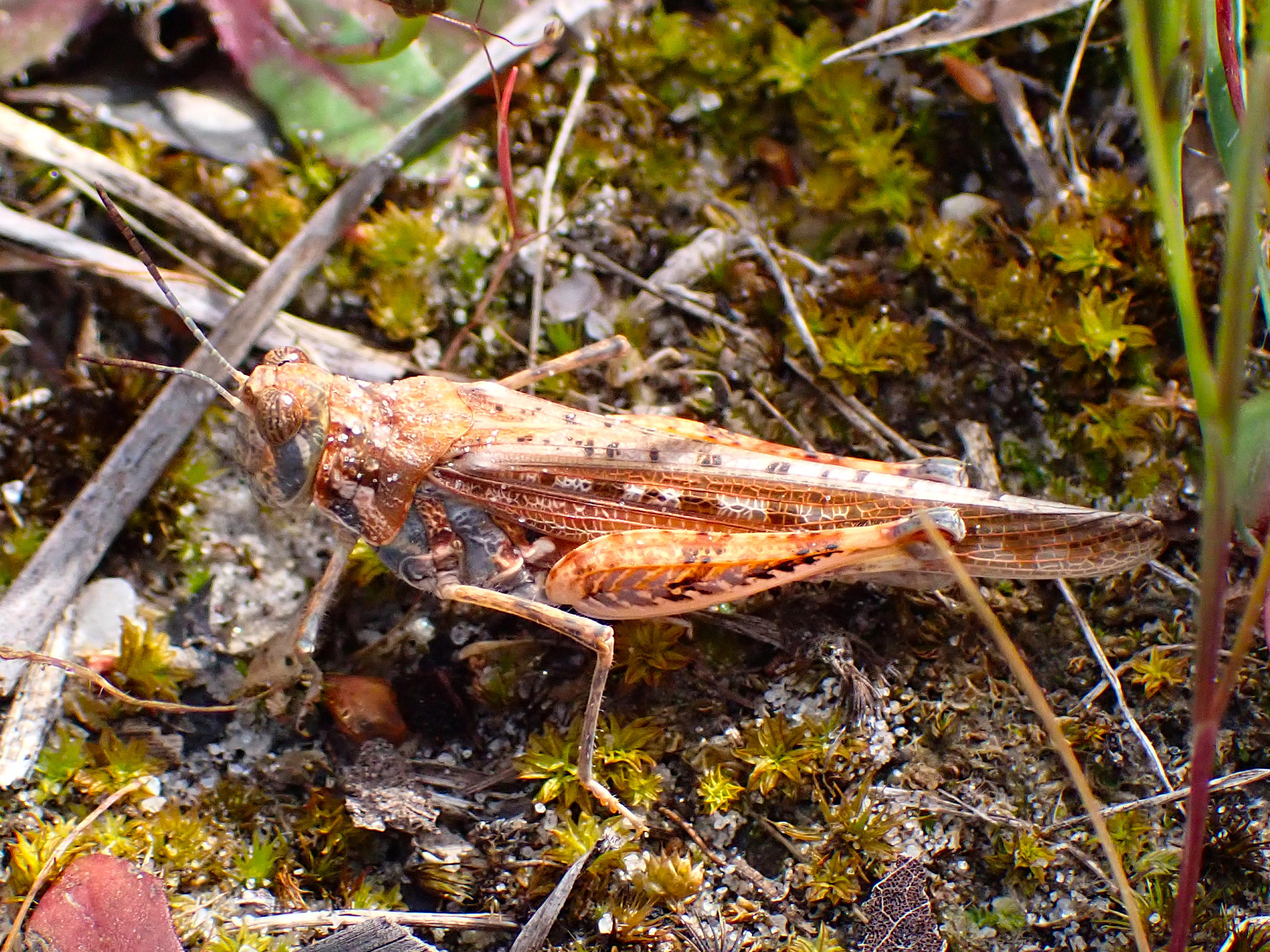
- Urnisa guttulosa, Australia

Scientific classification
- Kingdom: Animalia
- Phylum: Arthropoda
- Clade: Pancrustacea
- Class: Insecta
- Order: Orthoptera
- Suborder: Caelifera
- Family: Acrididae
- Subfamily: Catantopinae
- Tribe: Catantopini
- Subtribe: Urnisina
- Genus: Urnisa
- Species: U. guttulosa

Binomial name
- Urnisa guttulosa (Walker, 1870)

= Urnisa guttulosa =

Species of short-horned grasshopper

Urnisa guttulosa is a species of short-horned grasshopper in the family Acrididae. It is found in Australia.

== Subspecies ==
These subspecies belong to the species Urnisa guttulosa:

- Urnisa guttulosa guttulosa (Walker, 1870) (Common Urnisa)
- Urnisa guttulosa minor Sjöstedt, 1921
