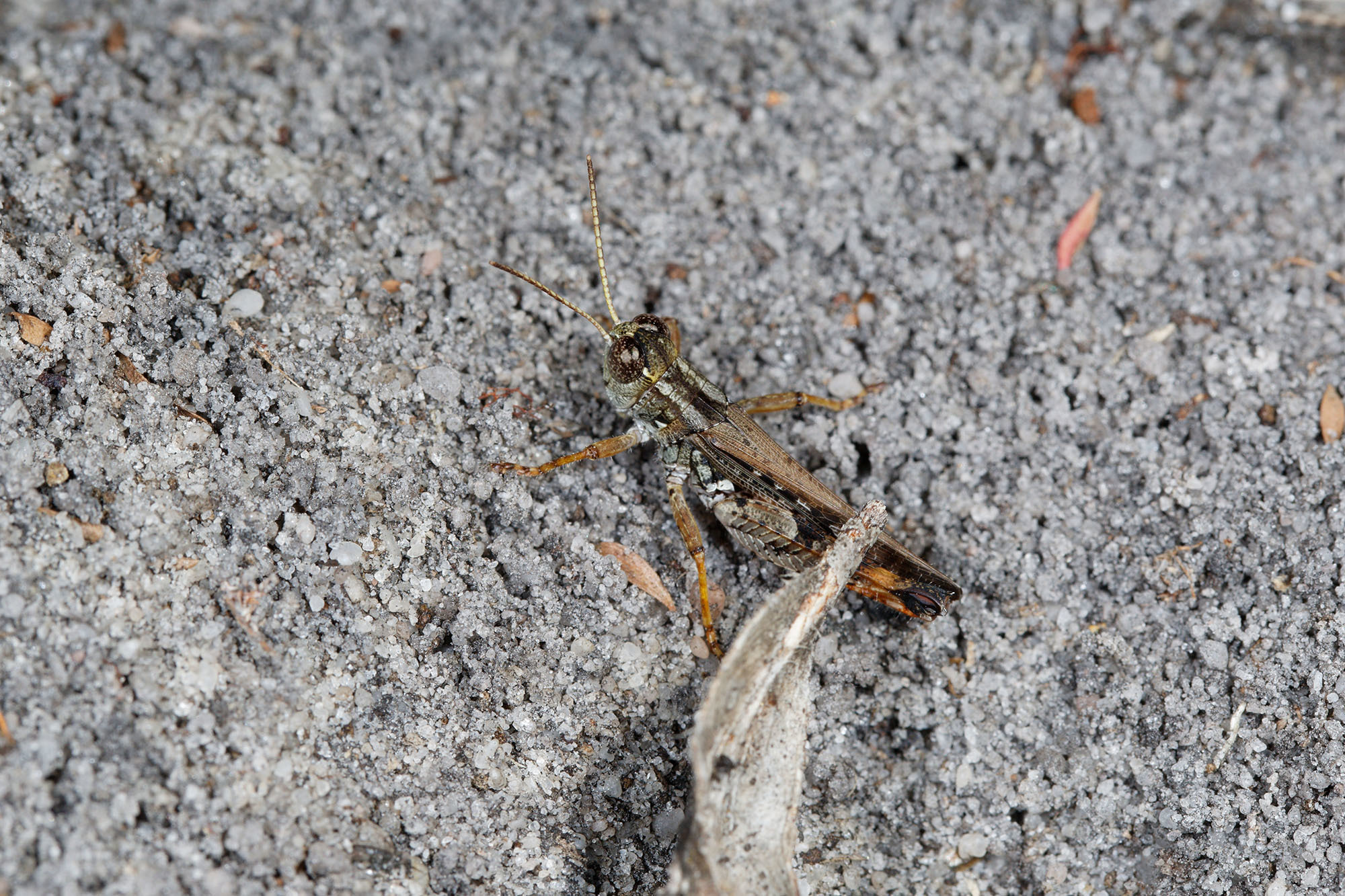
- Minyacris nana, tiny grasshopper, Australia

Scientific classification
- Kingdom: Animalia
- Phylum: Arthropoda
- Clade: Pancrustacea
- Class: Insecta
- Order: Orthoptera
- Suborder: Caelifera
- Family: Acrididae
- Subfamily: Catantopinae
- Tribe: Catantopini
- Subtribe: Perbelliina
- Genus: Minyacris; Key, 1992

= Minyacris =

Genus of grasshoppers

Minyacris is a genus of spur-throated grasshoppers in the family Acrididae. There are two described species in Minyacris. Minyacris nana is found in southeastern Australia, and Minyacris occidentalis is found in western Australia.

== Species ==
These two species belong to the genus Minyacris:

- Minyacris nana (Sjöstedt, 1921) (tiny grasshopper)
- Minyacris occidentalis Key, 1992
