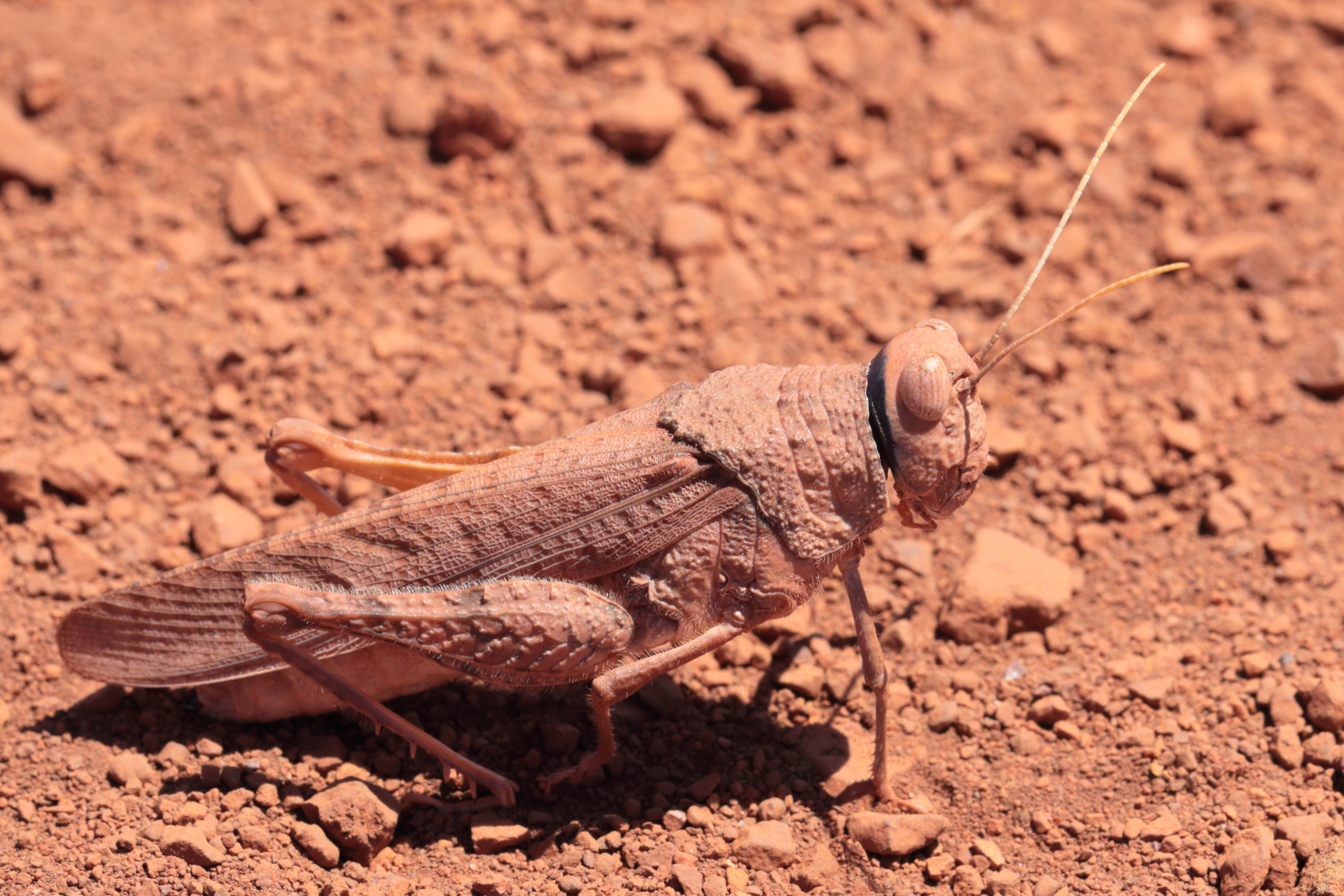

Scientific classification
- Kingdom: Animalia
- Phylum: Arthropoda
- Clade: Pancrustacea
- Class: Insecta
- Order: Orthoptera
- Suborder: Caelifera
- Family: Acrididae
- Genus: Buforania
- Species: B. rufa

Binomial name
- Buforania rufa Sjöstedt, 1920

= Buforania rufa =

Species of grasshopper

Buforania rufa, sometimes called the rufous toadhopper, is a spur-throated grasshopper native to Western Australia.
