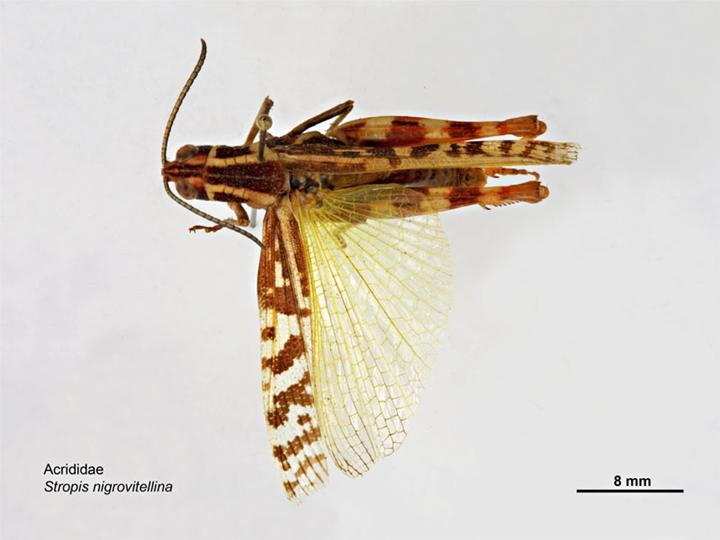

Scientific classification
- Kingdom: Animalia
- Phylum: Arthropoda
- Clade: Pancrustacea
- Class: Insecta
- Order: Orthoptera
- Suborder: Caelifera
- Family: Acrididae
- Tribe: Catantopini
- Genus: Stropis; Sjöstedt, 1920

Type genus
- Stropis

Type species
- Stropis nigrovitellina

= Stropis =

Genus of insects

Stropis is a genus of short-horned grasshopper in the family Acrididae. It is found in north Australian savannas. The genus includes:

- Stropis glaucescens Sjöstedt, 1934
- Stropis maculosa (Stål, 1861)
- Stropis nigrovitellina Sjöstedt, 1920
- Stropis subpustulata (Walker, 1871)
