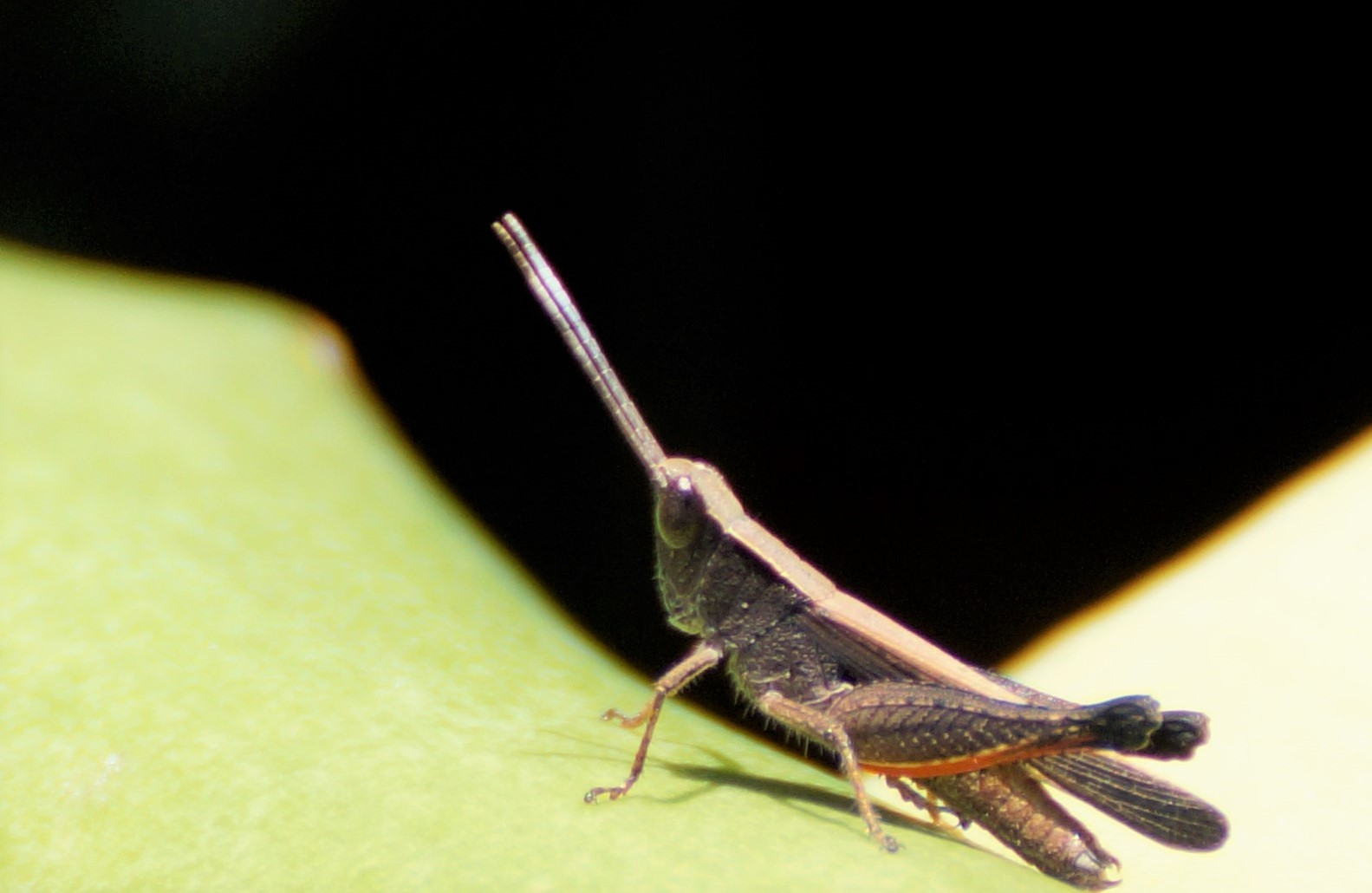
- Rectitropis, Australia

Scientific classification
- Kingdom: Animalia
- Phylum: Arthropoda
- Clade: Pancrustacea
- Class: Insecta
- Order: Orthoptera
- Suborder: Caelifera
- Family: Acrididae
- Subfamily: Catantopinae
- Tribe: Catantopini
- Subtribe: Perbelliina
- Genus: Rectitropis; Sjöstedt, 1936

= Rectitropis =

Genus of insects

Rectitropis is a genus of spur-throated grasshoppers in the family Acrididae. There are at least three described species in Rectitropis, found in Australia.

== Species ==
These three species belong to the genus Rectitropis:

- Rectitropis australis Sjöstedt, 1936 (Queensland White-tips)
- Rectitropis brunneri (Bolívar, 1898)
- Rectitropis exclusa (Walker, 1870) (Territory White-tips)
