= Azelota =

Scientific classification
- Kingdom: Animalia
- Phylum: Arthropoda
- Clade: Pancrustacea
- Class: Insecta
- Order: Orthoptera
- Suborder: Caelifera
- Family: Acrididae
- Tribe: Catantopini
- Genus: Azelota; Brunner von Wattenwyl, 1893

Genus of grasshoppers

Azelota is a genus of grasshoppers belonging to the family Acrididae.

The species of this genus are found in Australia.

Species:

- Azelota diversipes J.A.G.Rehn, 1907
- Azelota parvula Sjöstedt, 1920
- Azelota pilipes (F.Walker, 1870)
