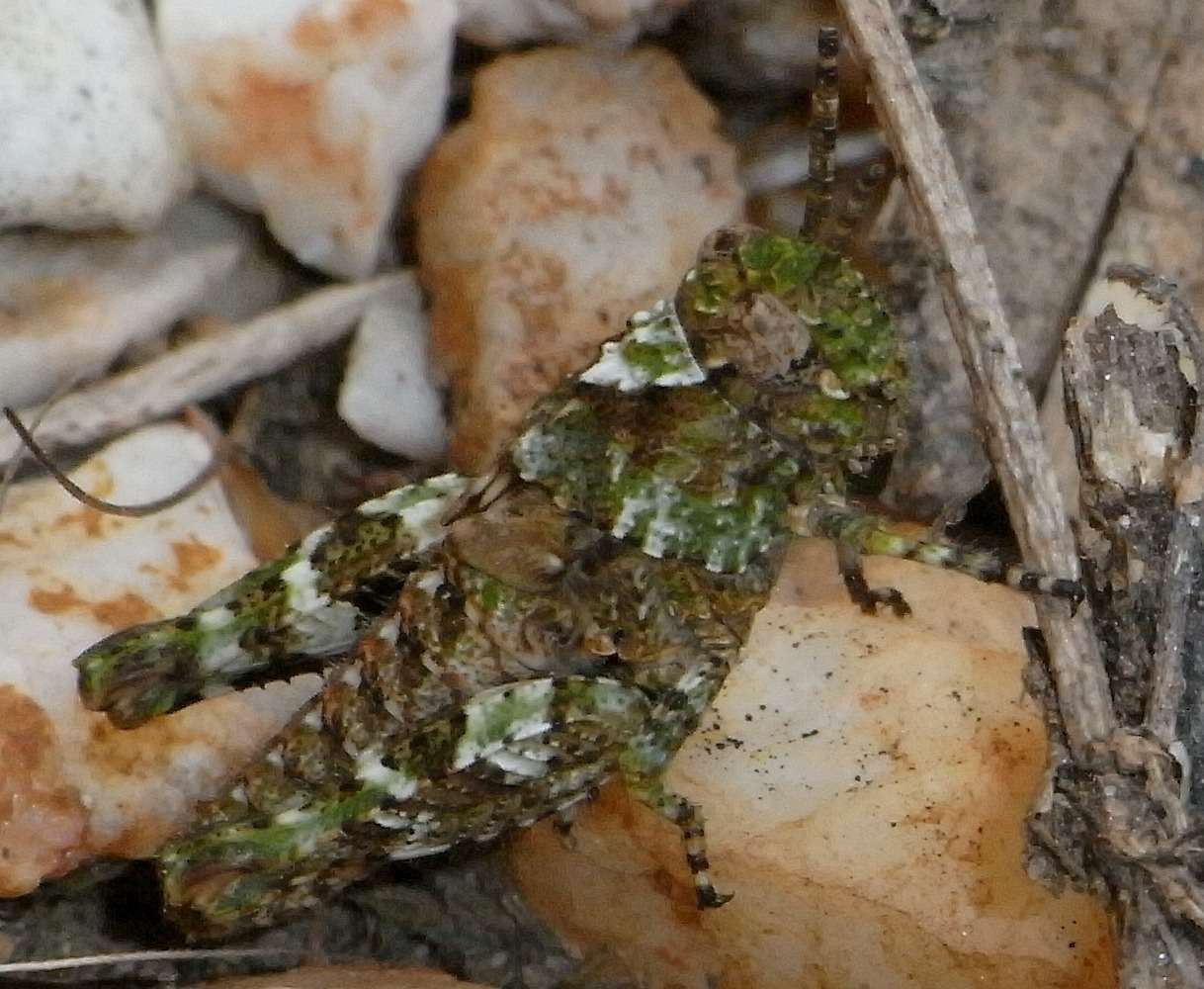
- Cirphula pyrrhocnemis, Variable Cirphula, Australia

Scientific classification
- Kingdom: Animalia
- Phylum: Arthropoda
- Clade: Pancrustacea
- Class: Insecta
- Order: Orthoptera
- Suborder: Caelifera
- Family: Acrididae
- Subfamily: Catantopinae
- Tribe: Catantopini
- Subtribe: Cirphulina
- Genus: Cirphula; Stål, 1873

= Cirphula =

Genus of grasshoppers

Cirphula is a genus of short-horned grasshoppers in the family Acrididae. There are at least four described species in Cirphula, found in Australia.

== Species ==
These four species belong to the genus Cirphula:

- Cirphula carbonaria (Serville, 1838)
- Cirphula flavotibialis Sjöstedt, 1936 (Eyre Cirphula)
- Cirphula jungi Brancsik, 1895
- Cirphula pyrrhocnemis (Stål, 1861) (Variable Cirphula)
