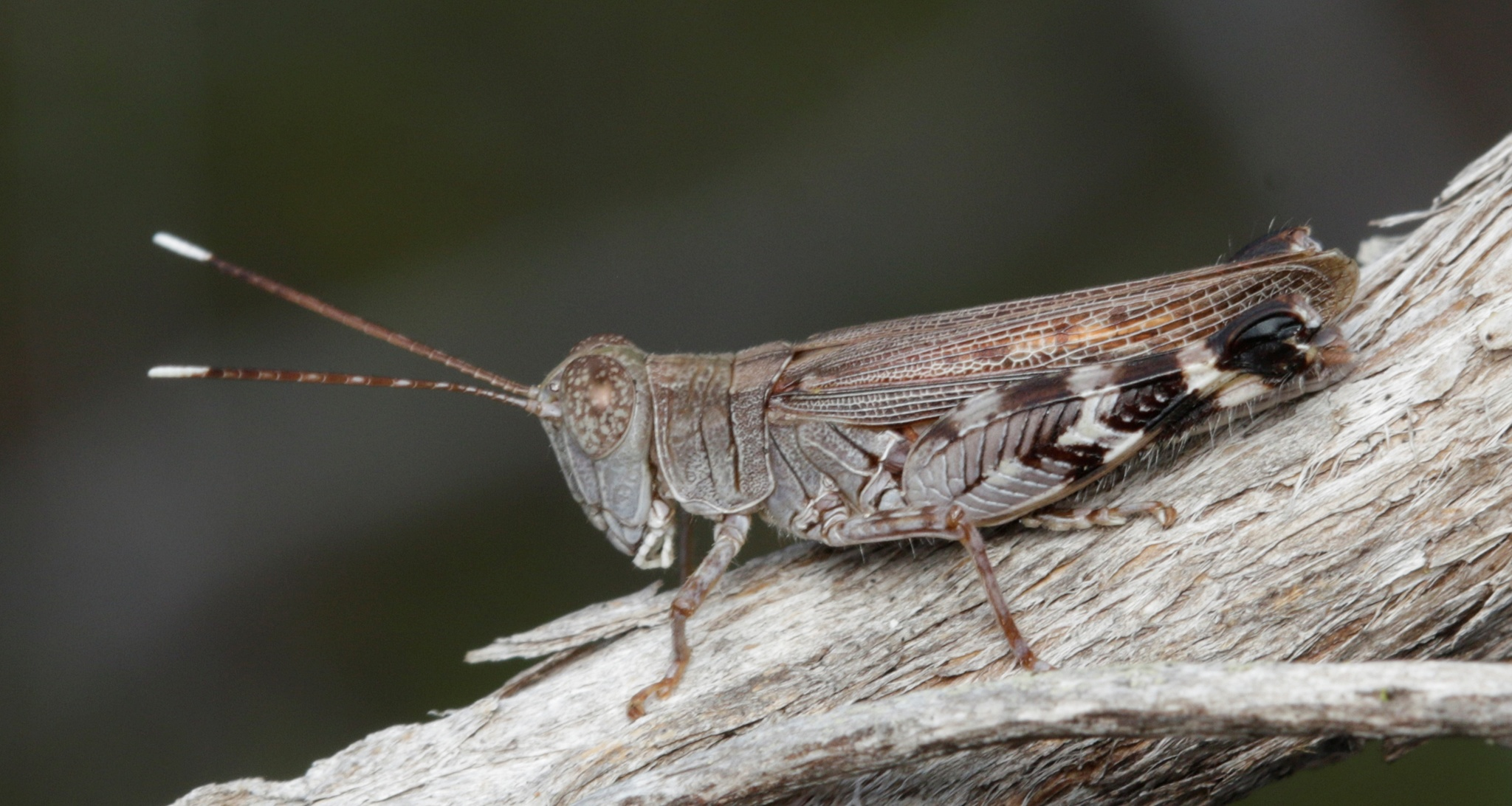

Scientific classification
- Kingdom: Animalia
- Phylum: Arthropoda
- Clade: Pancrustacea
- Class: Insecta
- Order: Orthoptera
- Suborder: Caelifera
- Family: Acrididae
- Subfamily: Catantopinae
- Tribe: Catantopini
- Subtribe: Aretzina
- Genus: Aretza; Sjöstedt, 1921

Species
- Aretza erythroptera Sjöstedt, 1921; Aretza longicornis Sjöstedt, 1921

= Aretza =

Genus of grasshoppers

Aretza is a genus of shorthorn grasshopper from the Acrididae family found in north Australian savannas, particularly in the wet season. They are notoriously difficult to catch or photograph because of their swift movement due to heat produced from the sandstone habitat.

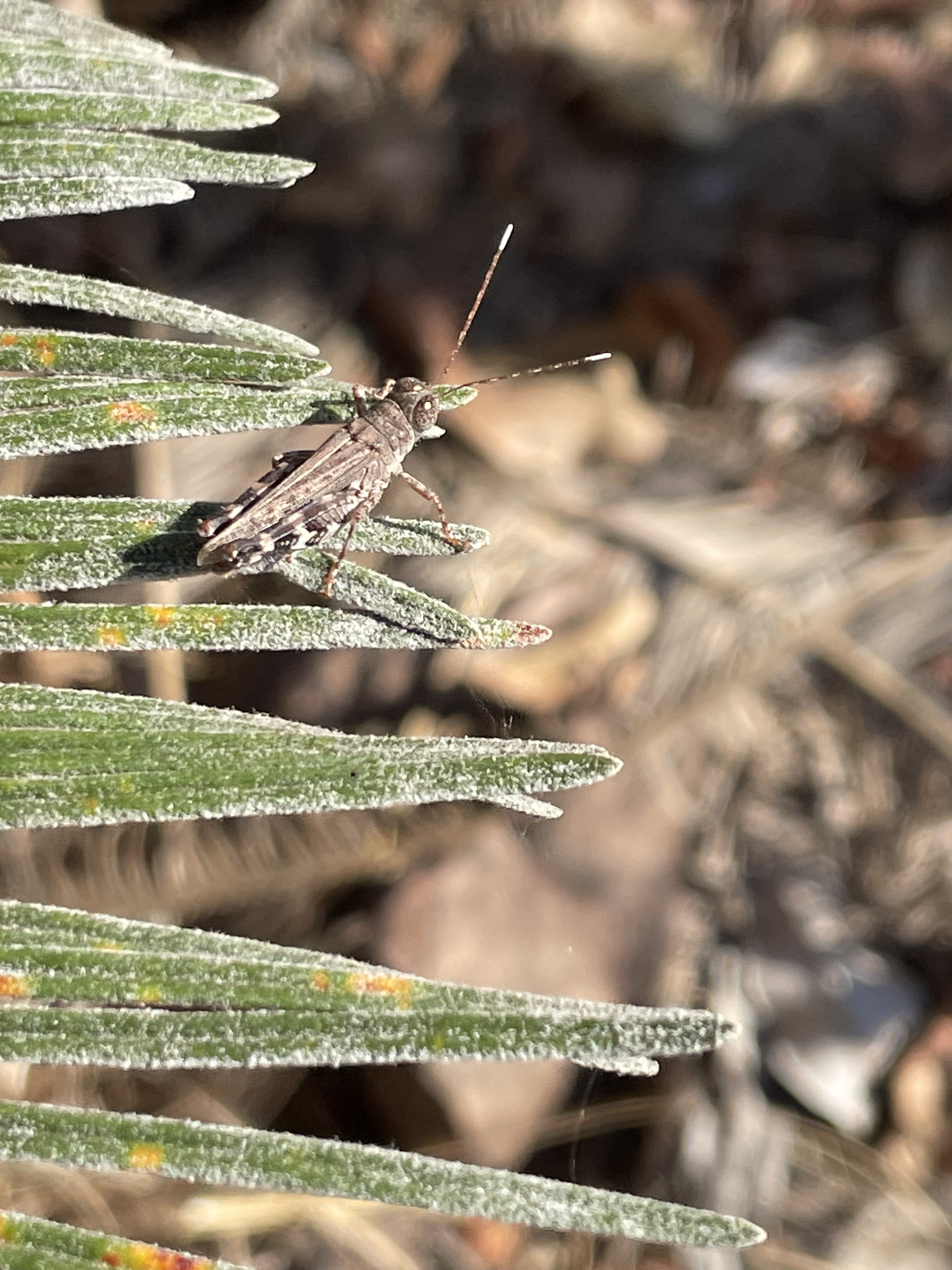
A acrididae short-horned grasshopper found on a local cycas species in Litchfield National Park in the Northern Territory of Australia.
