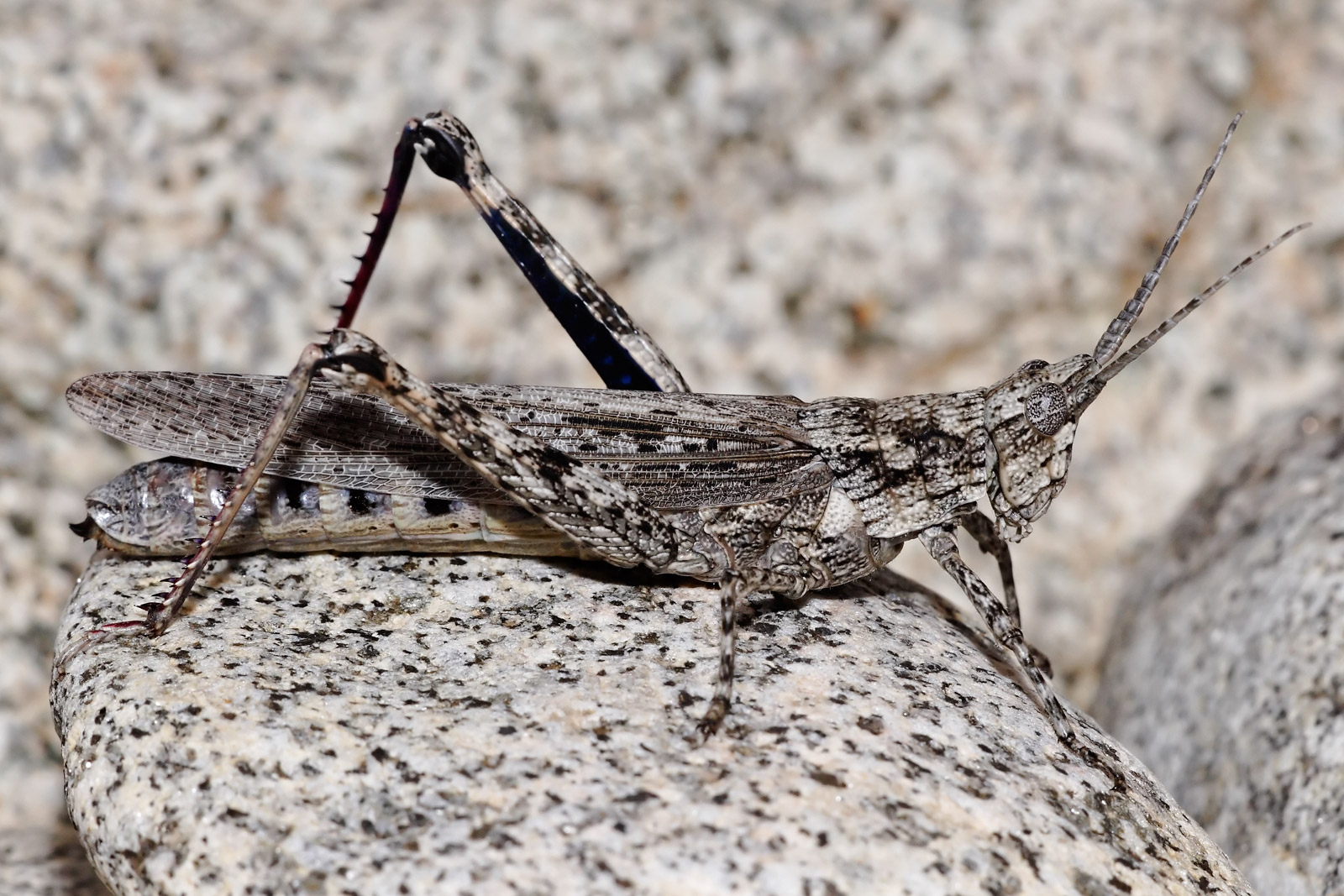
- Coryphistes ruricola, Bark-mimicking Grasshopper

Scientific classification
- Kingdom: Animalia
- Phylum: Arthropoda
- Clade: Pancrustacea
- Class: Insecta
- Order: Orthoptera
- Suborder: Caelifera
- Family: Acrididae
- Subfamily: Catantopinae
- Tribe: Catantopini
- Subtribe: Coryphistina
- Genus: Coryphistes; Charpentier, 1845

= Coryphistes =

Genus of grasshoppers

Coryphistes is a genus of short-horned grasshoppers in the family Acrididae. There are at least three described species in Coryphistes, found in Australia.

== Species ==
These species belong to the genus Coryphistes:

- Coryphistes glabriceps Sjöstedt, 1920 (Redlands Coryphistes)
- Coryphistes interioris Tepper, 1896 (Hairy Coryphistes)
- Coryphistes ruricola (Burmeister, 1838) (Bark-mimicking Grasshopper)
