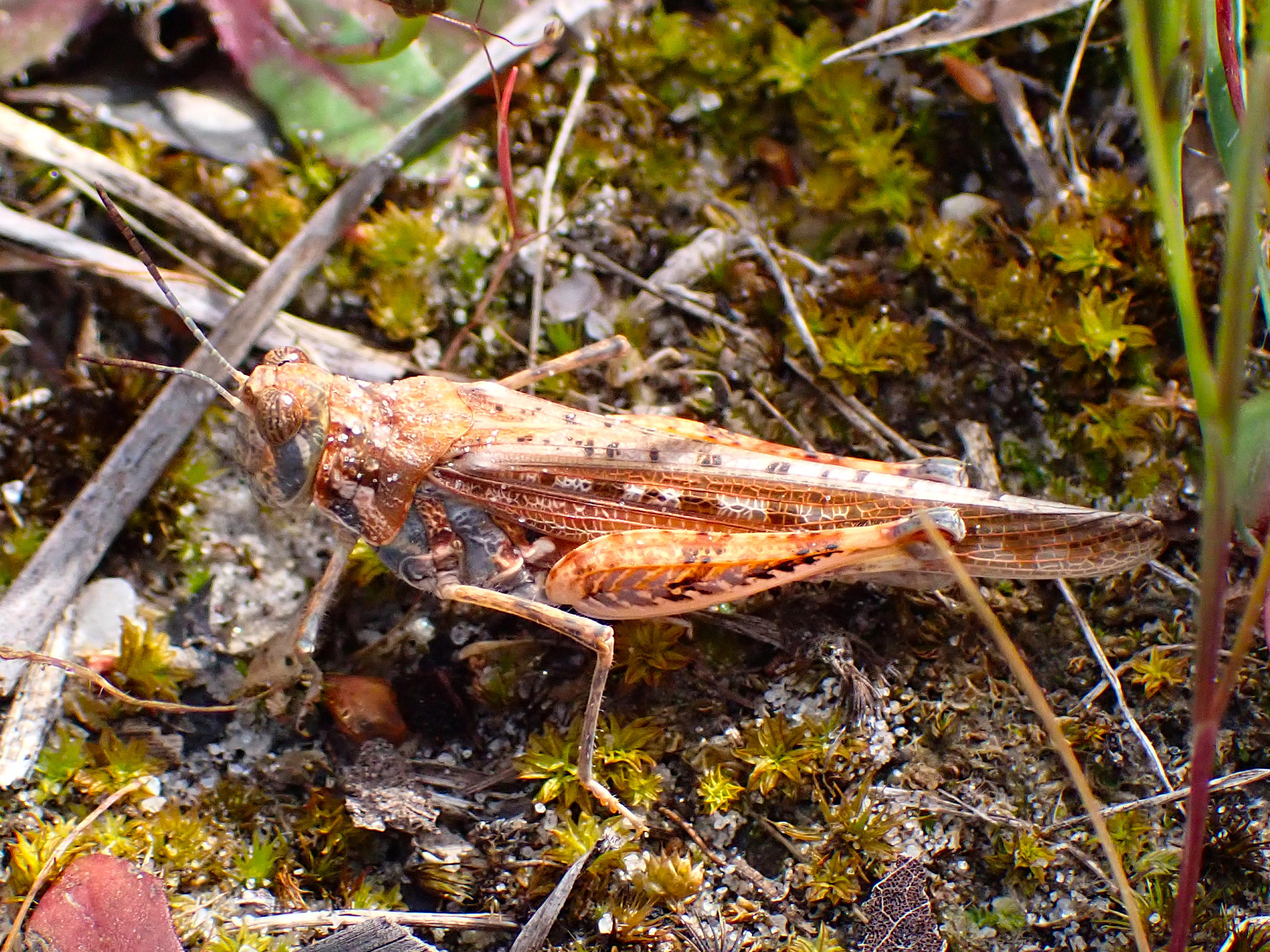
- Urnisa guttulosa, Australia

Scientific classification
- Kingdom: Animalia
- Phylum: Arthropoda
- Clade: Pancrustacea
- Class: Insecta
- Order: Orthoptera
- Suborder: Caelifera
- Family: Acrididae
- Subfamily: Catantopinae
- Tribe: Catantopini
- Subtribe: Urnisina
- Genus: Urnisa; Stål, 1861

= Urnisa =

Genus of grasshoppers

Urnisa is a genus of short-horned grasshoppers in the family Acrididae. There are at least three described species in Urnisa, found in Australia.

== Species ==
These species belong to the genus Urnisa:

- Urnisa erythrocnemis (Stål, 1861) (Plain Urnisa)
- Urnisa guttulosa (Walker, 1870)
- Urnisa rugosa Saussure, 1884 (Red-legged Urnisa)
