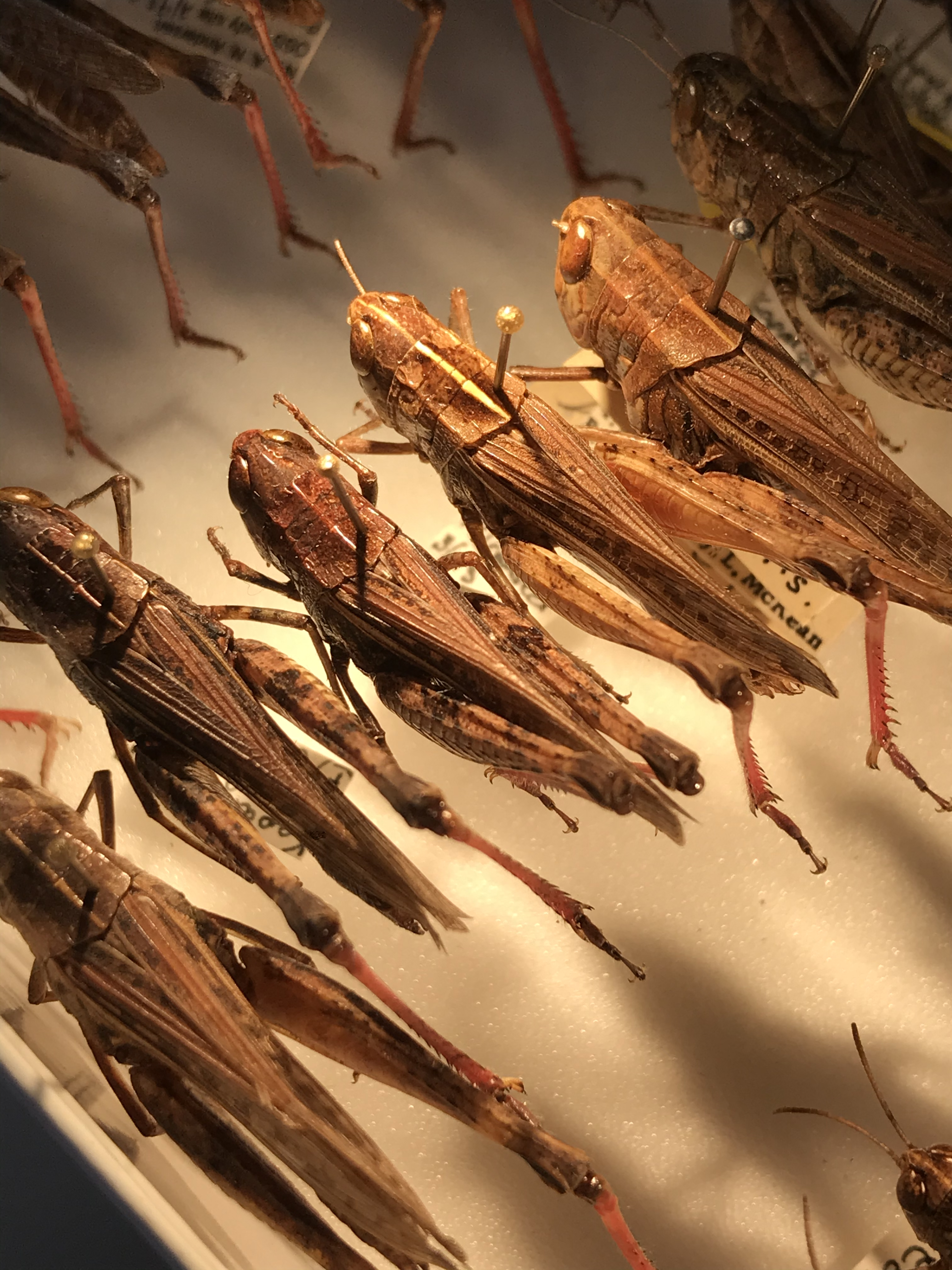

Scientific classification
- Kingdom: Animalia
- Phylum: Arthropoda
- Clade: Pancrustacea
- Class: Insecta
- Order: Orthoptera
- Suborder: Caelifera
- Family: Acrididae
- Tribe: Catantopini
- Subtribe: Peakesiina
- Genus: Caloptilla; Sjöstedt, 1921

Synonyms
- Caloptila Rentz, Lewis, Su & Upton, 2003; Proparazelum Sjöstedt, 1932

= Caloptilla =

Genus of insects

Caloptilla is a genus of grasshopper, found in north Australian savannas.

== Species ==
Species include:

- Caloptilla australis Sjöstedt, 1921 - type species
- Caloptilla lutescens (Walker, 1870)
