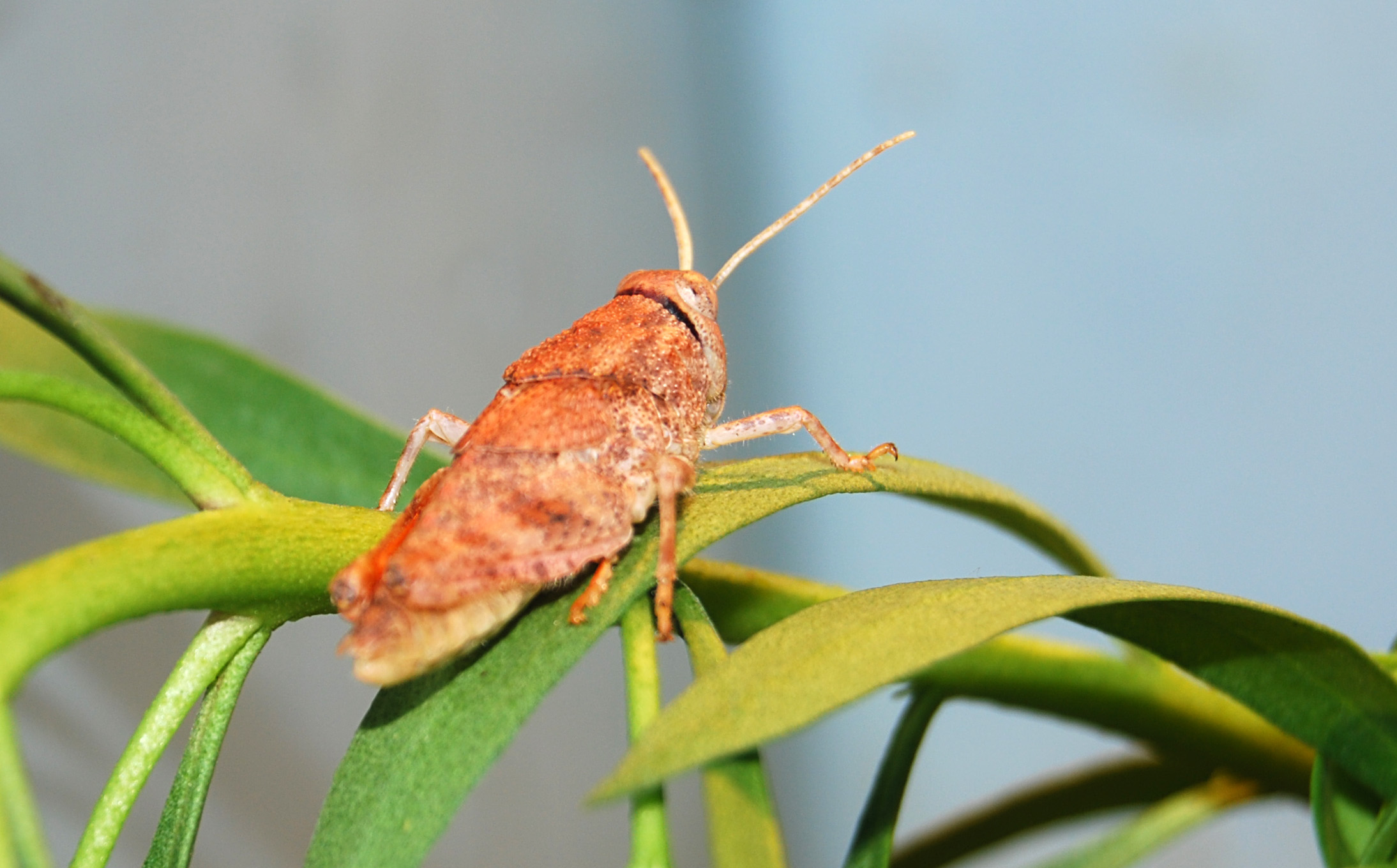
- Buforania crassa

Scientific classification
- Kingdom: Animalia
- Phylum: Arthropoda
- Clade: Pancrustacea
- Class: Insecta
- Order: Orthoptera
- Suborder: Caelifera
- Family: Acrididae
- Subfamily: Catantopinae
- Tribe: Catantopini
- Genus: Buforania; Sjöstedt, 1920

= Buforania =

Genus of grasshoppers

Buforania is a genus of grasshoppers in the tribe Catantopini from Australia.

== Species ==
Species include:

- Buforania crassa
- Buforania rufa
