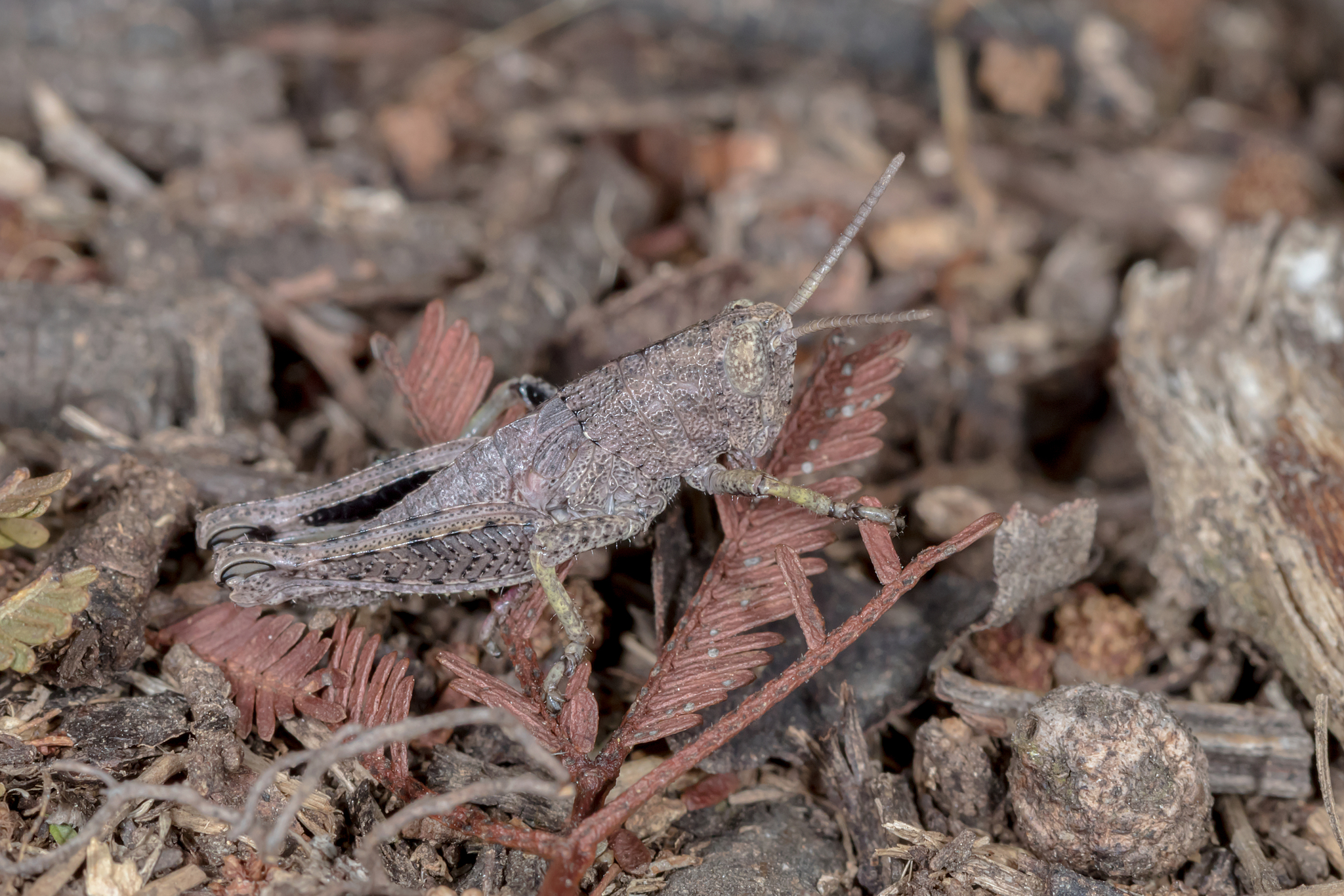
- Percassa rugifrons, Mountain Grasshopper, Australia

Scientific classification
- Kingdom: Animalia
- Phylum: Arthropoda
- Clade: Pancrustacea
- Class: Insecta
- Order: Orthoptera
- Suborder: Caelifera
- Family: Acrididae
- Subfamily: Catantopinae
- Tribe: Catantopini
- Genus: Percassa; Sjöstedt, 1921
- Species: P. rugifrons

Binomial name
- Percassa rugifrons (Stål, 1878)

= Percassa =

Genus of grasshoppers

Percassa is a genus of short-horned grasshoppers in the family Acrididae. There is one described species in Percassa, P. rugifrons, found in Australia.
