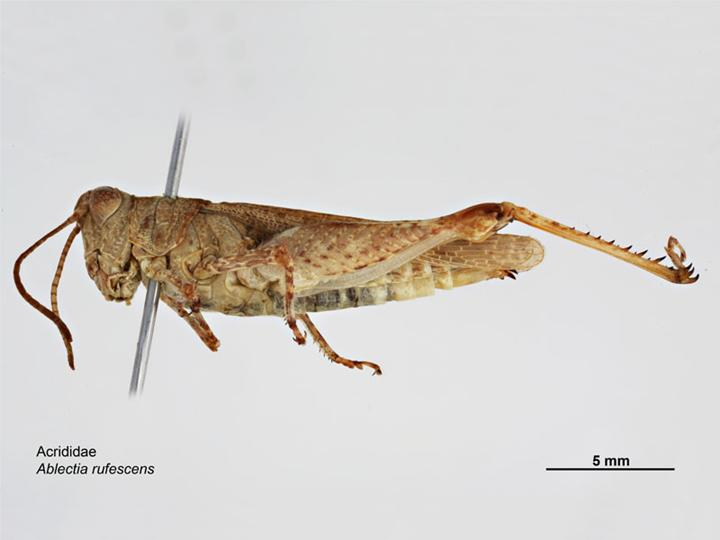
- Ablectia rufescens

Scientific classification
- Kingdom: Animalia
- Phylum: Arthropoda
- Clade: Pancrustacea
- Class: Insecta
- Order: Orthoptera
- Suborder: Caelifera
- Family: Acrididae
- Tribe: Catantopini
- Subtribe: Perbelliina
- Genus: Ablectia; Sjöstedt, 1921
- Species: A. rufescens

Binomial name
- Ablectia rufescens Sjöstedt, 1921

= Ablectia =

Genus of grasshoppers

Ablectia is a monotypic genus of grasshoppers belonging to the family Acrididae. The only species is Ablectia rufescens from Australia.
