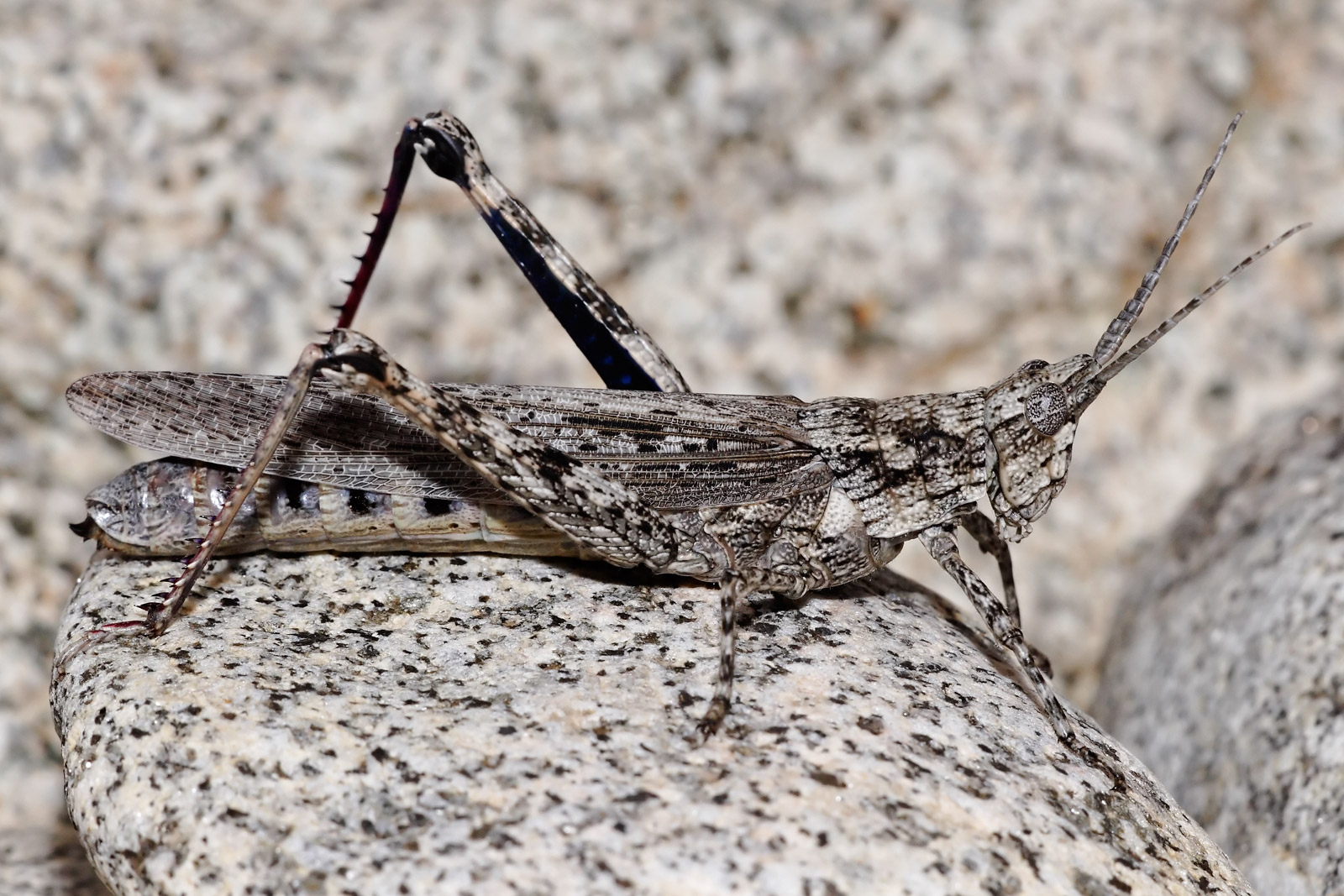
- Coryphistes ruricola, Bark-mimicking Grasshopper, Australia

Scientific classification
- Kingdom: Animalia
- Phylum: Arthropoda
- Clade: Pancrustacea
- Class: Insecta
- Order: Orthoptera
- Suborder: Caelifera
- Family: Acrididae
- Subfamily: Catantopinae
- Tribe: Catantopini
- Subtribe: Coryphistina
- Genus: Coryphistes
- Species: C. ruricola

Binomial name
- Coryphistes ruricola (Burmeister, 1838)

= Coryphistes ruricola =

Species of grasshopper

Coryphistes ruricola, the Bark-mimicking Grasshopper, is a species of short-horned grasshopper in the family Acrididae. It is found in Australia.
