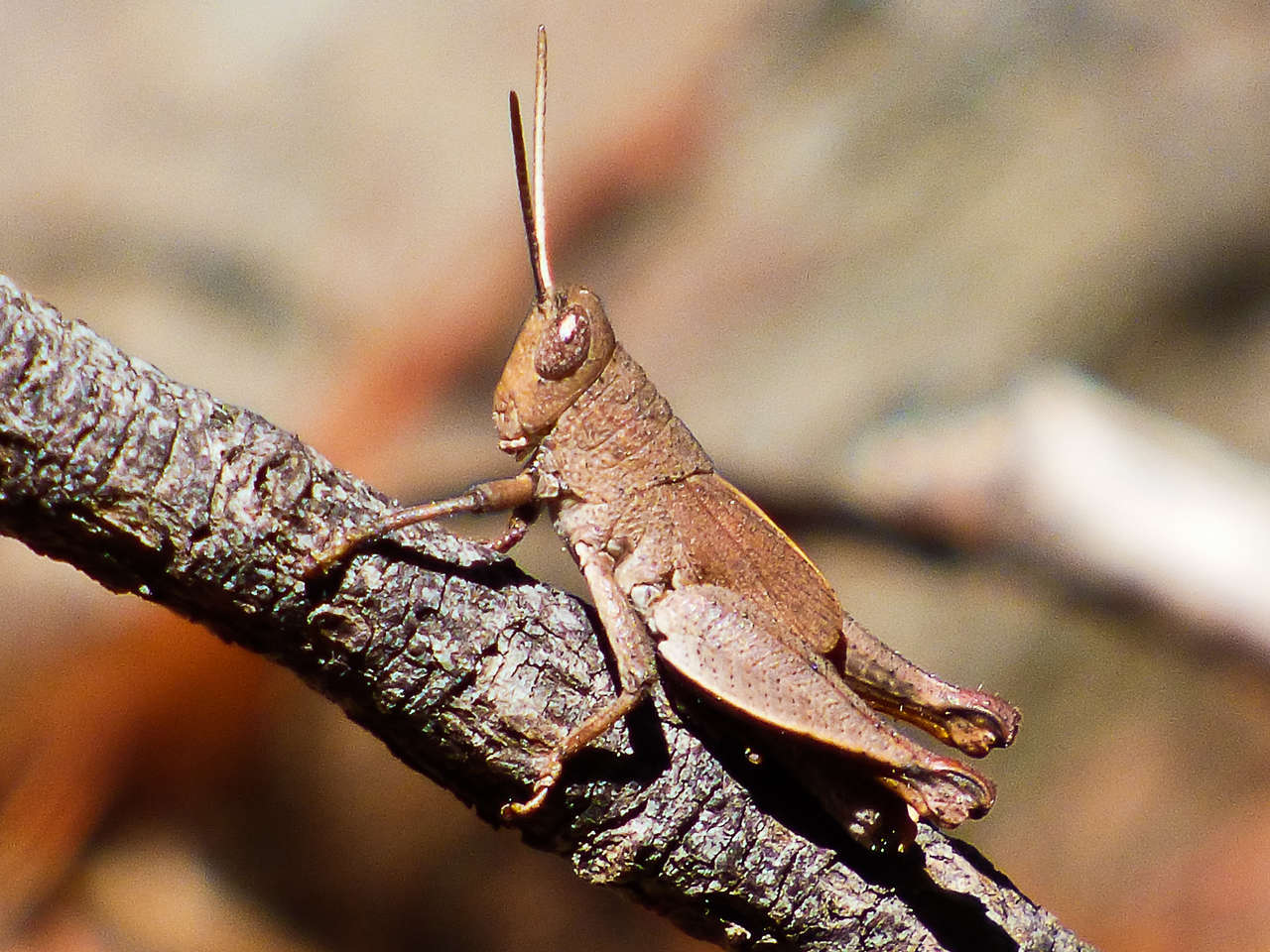
- Rhitzala modesta, Short-winged Heath Grasshopper, Australia

Scientific classification
- Kingdom: Animalia
- Phylum: Arthropoda
- Clade: Pancrustacea
- Class: Insecta
- Order: Orthoptera
- Suborder: Caelifera
- Family: Acrididae
- Tribe: Catantopini
- Subtribe: Urnisina
- Genus: Rhitzala; Sjöstedt, 1921
- Species: R. modesta

Binomial name
- Rhitzala modesta Sjöstedt, 1921

= Rhitzala =

Genus of grasshoppers

Rhitzala is a genus of short-horned grasshoppers in the family Acrididae. There is one described species in Rhitzala, R. modesta, found in Australia.
