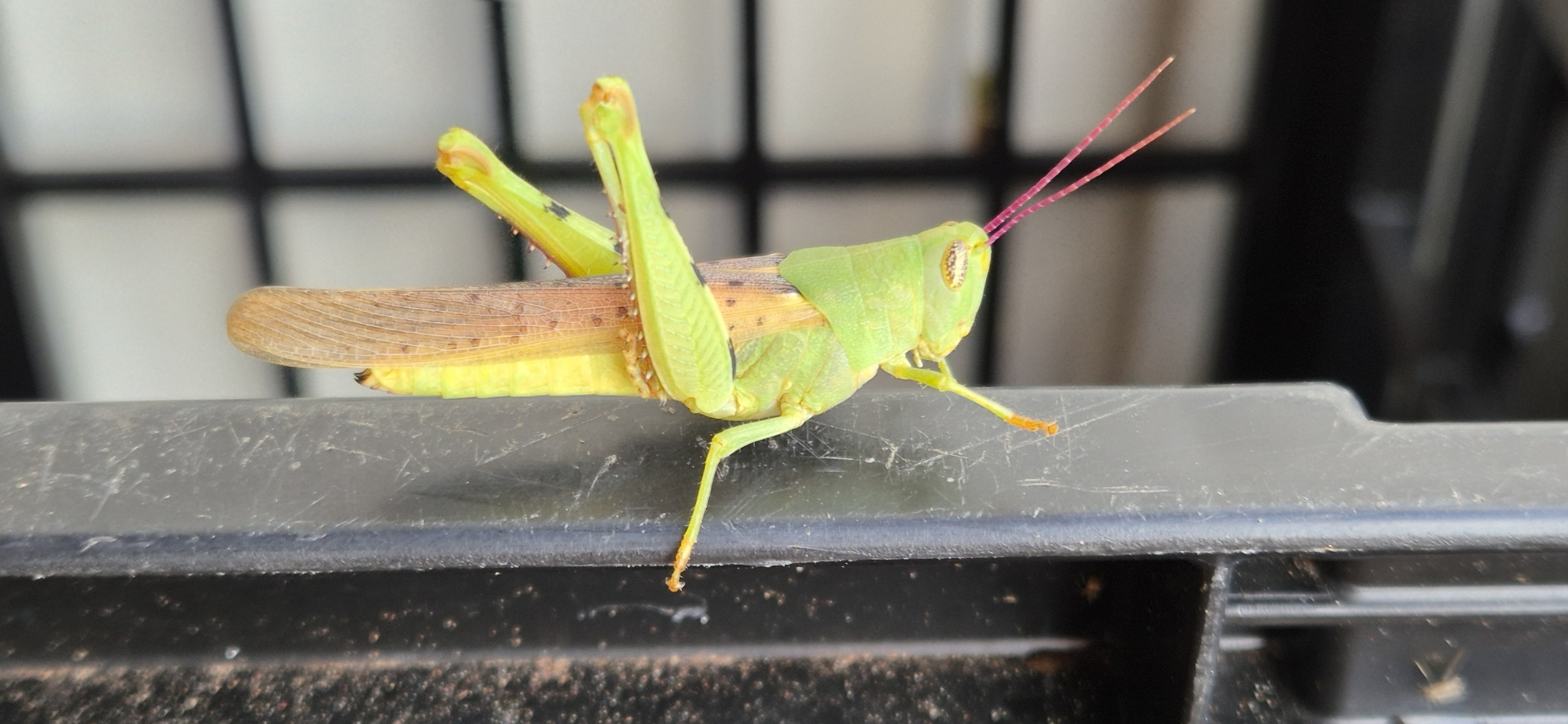

Scientific classification
- Kingdom: Animalia
- Phylum: Arthropoda
- Clade: Pancrustacea
- Class: Insecta
- Order: Orthoptera
- Suborder: Caelifera
- Family: Acrididae
- Genus: Adlappa; Sjöstedt, 1920
- Species: A. erythroptera

Binomial name
- Adlappa erythroptera Sjöstedt, 1920

= Adlappa =

Genus of grasshoppers

Adlappa is a monotypic genus of grasshoppers belonging to the family Acrididae. The only species is Adlappa erythroptera.

It is a pale green color with prominent spots on the fore-wings and hind femur, with pale reddish wings. Adult females are around 44mm in length and males are 28mm in length.

It is usually found in the eucalyptus woodland of north Australian savannas.
