= Russalpia =

Scientific classification
- Kingdom: Animalia
- Phylum: Arthropoda
- Clade: Pancrustacea
- Class: Insecta
- Order: Orthoptera
- Suborder: Caelifera
- Family: Acrididae
- Tribe: Catantopini
- Genus: Russalpia (Sjöstedt, 1921)

Genus of grasshoppers

Russalpia is a genus of grasshoppers endemic to Tasmania in the tribe Catantopini. The scientific name of this genus was first published in 1921 by Sjöstedt.

== Species ==
The genus Russalpia includes the following species:

- Russalpia albertisi Bolívar, 1898
- Russalpia longifurca Key, 1991

The two species can only be reliably separated by the male genitalia.

G. albertisi has no furcula or a short blunt furcula.

G. longifurca has a furcula the arms rather long, slender, sharp.
