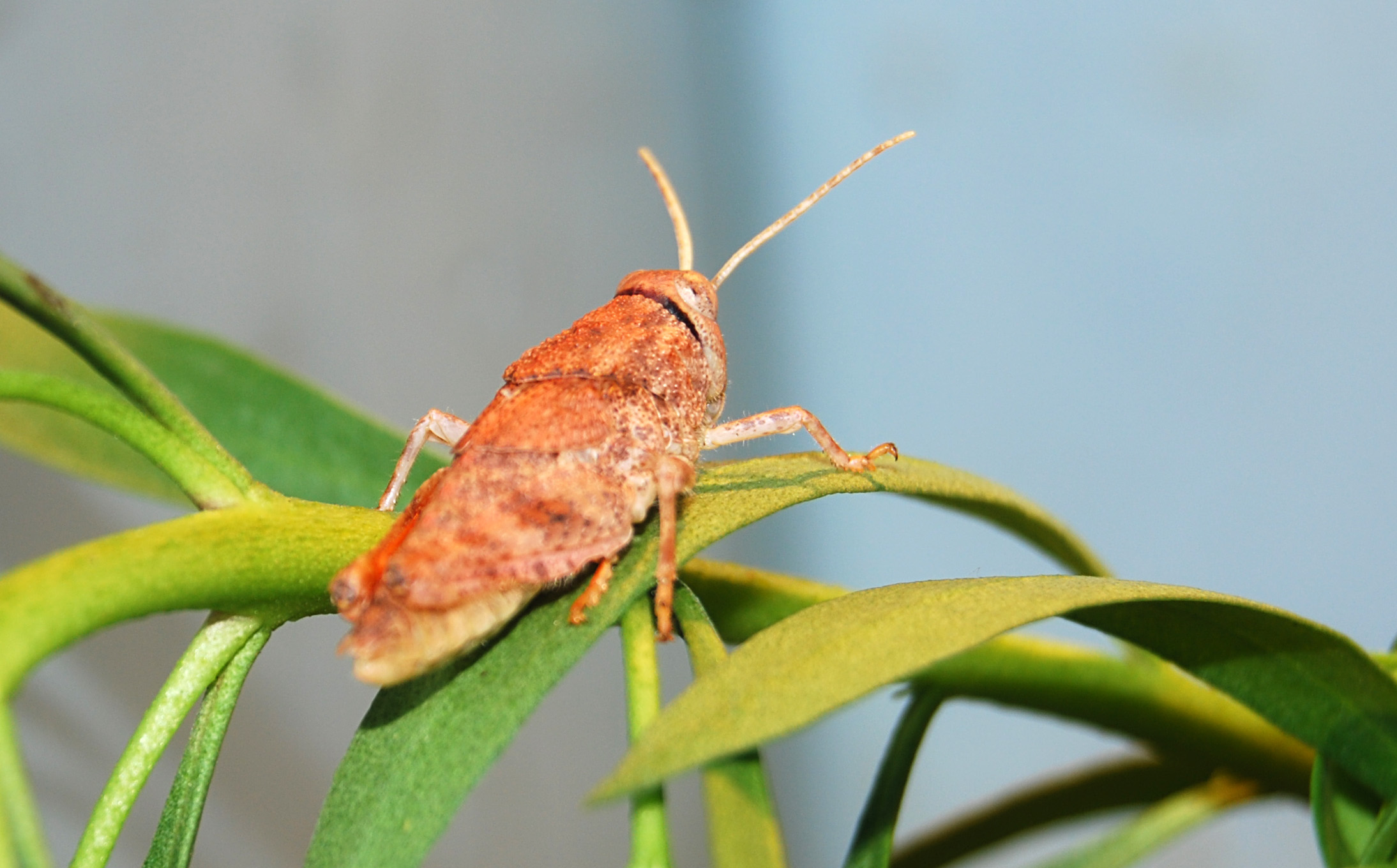

Scientific classification
- Kingdom: Animalia
- Phylum: Arthropoda
- Clade: Pancrustacea
- Class: Insecta
- Order: Orthoptera
- Suborder: Caelifera
- Family: Acrididae
- Genus: Buforania
- Species: B. crassa

Binomial name
- Buforania crassa Sjöstedt, 1920

= Toadhopper =

Species of grasshopper

The toadhopper (Buforania crassa) is a spur-throated grasshopper of the Northern Territory, Australia. They live around the edges of freshwater. They are generally 6-11 millimeters.

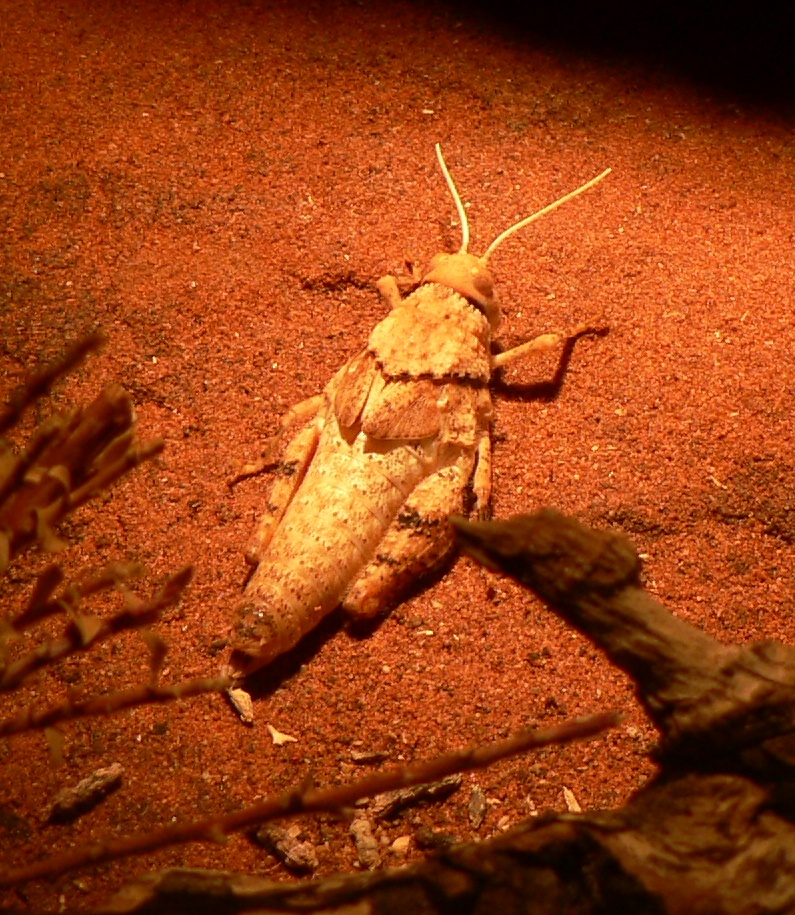
