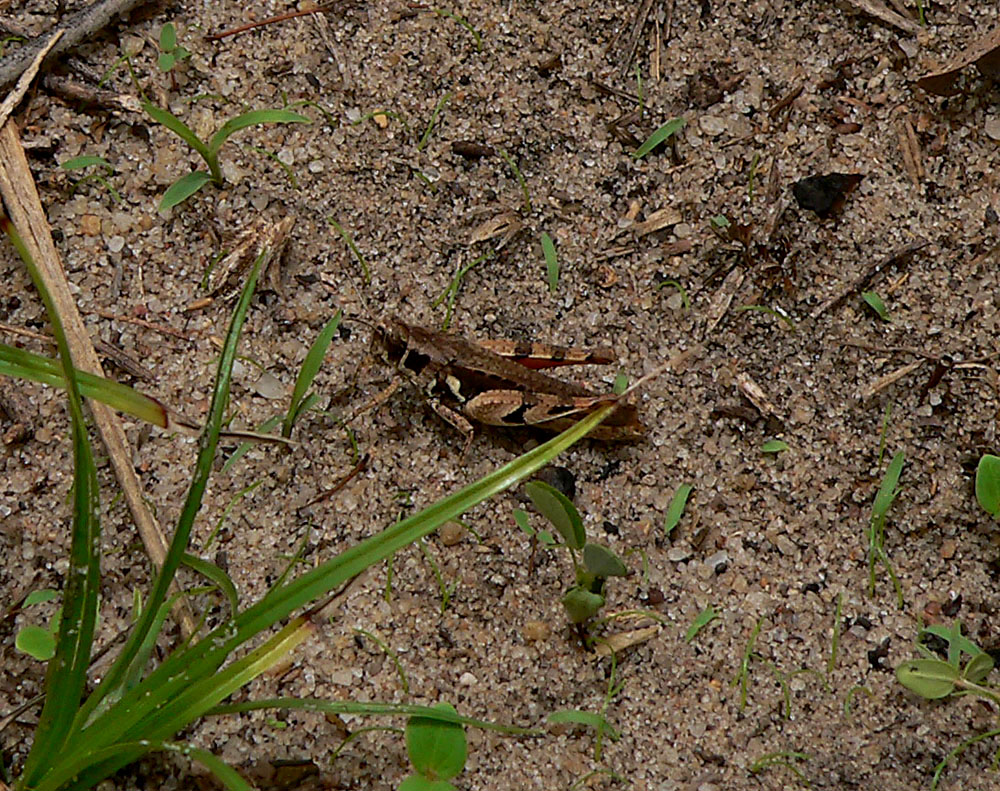
- Male Catantops stramineus photographed near Whydah, Benin, in 2006

Scientific classification
- Kingdom: Animalia
- Phylum: Arthropoda
- Clade: Pancrustacea
- Class: Insecta
- Order: Orthoptera
- Suborder: Caelifera
- Family: Acrididae
- Subfamily: Catantopinae
- Tribe: Catantopini; Brunner von Wattenwyl, 1893

Subtribes
- See text

= Catantopini =

Tribe of grasshoppers

Catantopini is a tribe in the subfamily Catantopinae, a group of grasshoppers found in Africa, Asia and Australia.

== Subtribes & genera ==
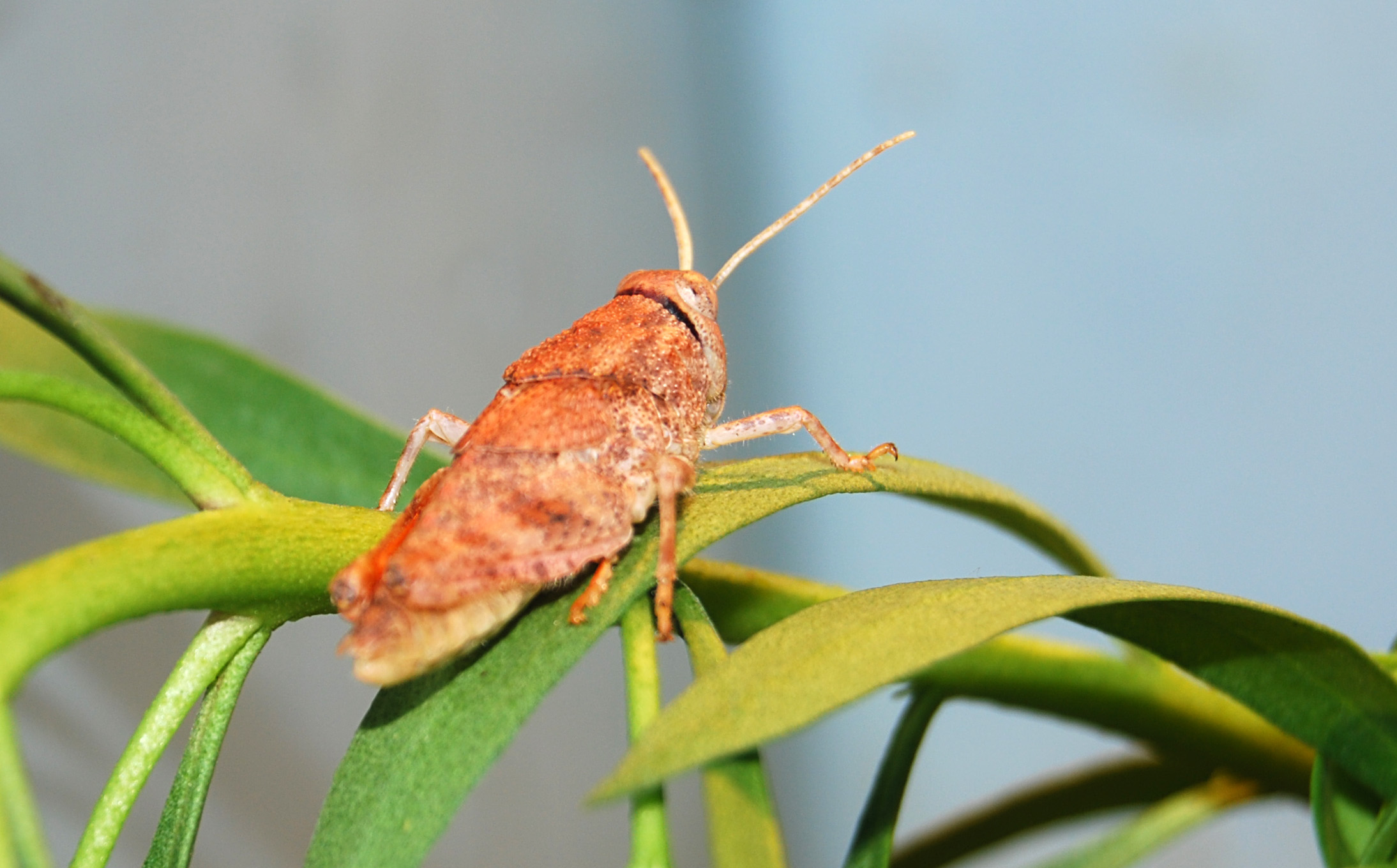
Buforania crassa

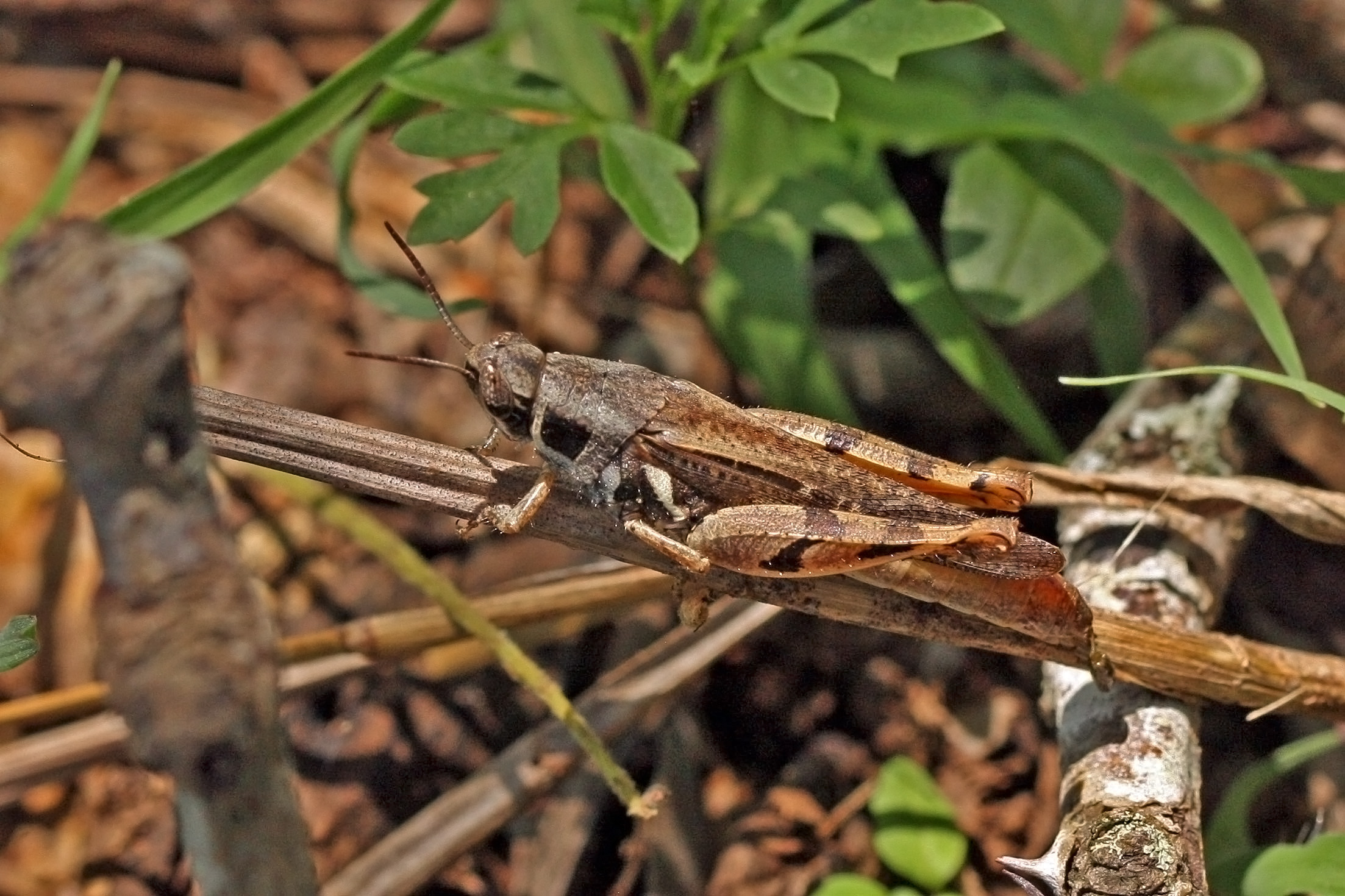
Catantops humeralis

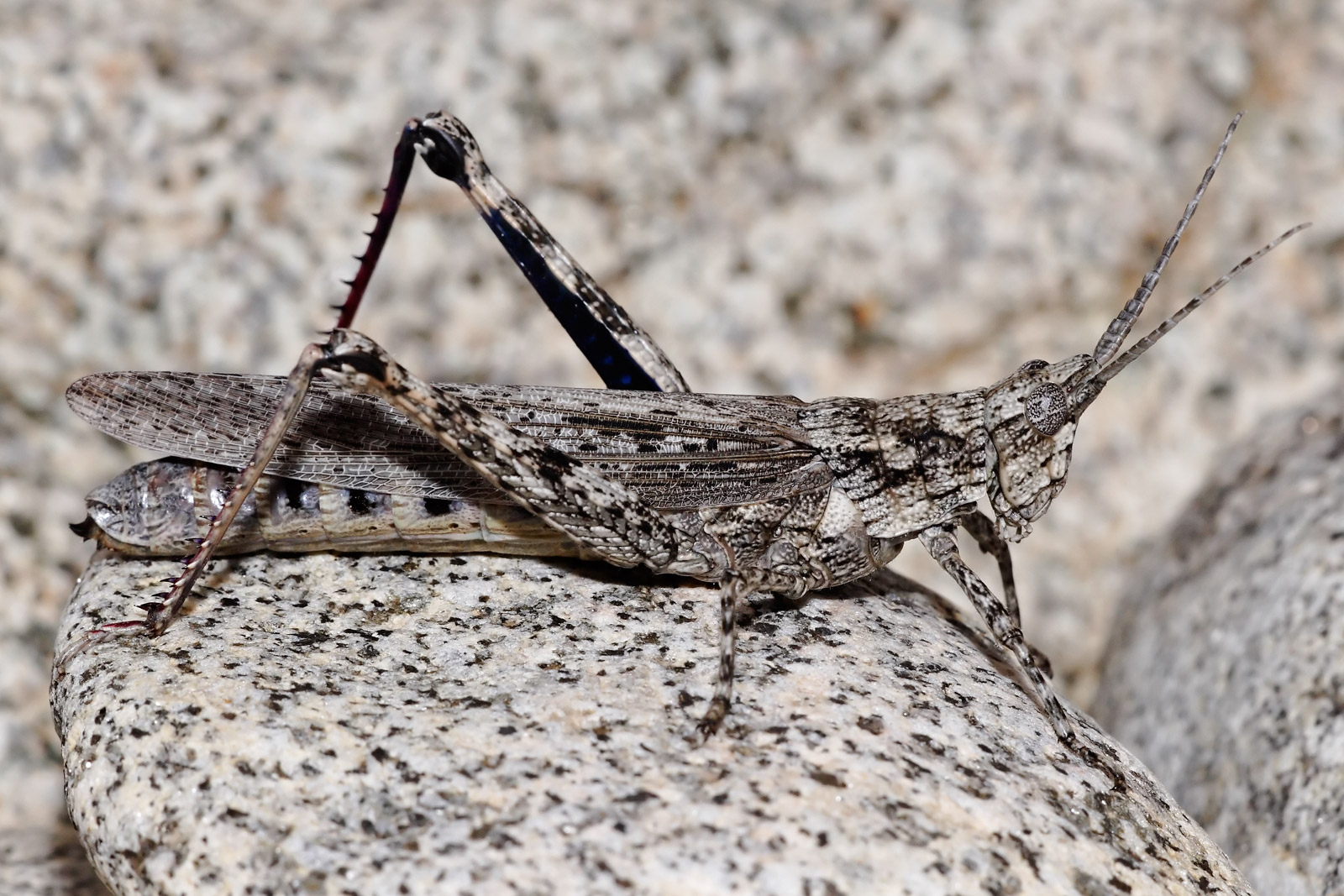
Bark Mimicking Grasshopper, Coryphistes ruricola

The Orthoptera Species File lists the following (genera incomplete):

- subtribe Apotropina Key, 1993 - Australia
  - Apotropis Bolívar, 1906
  - Azelota Brunner von Wattenwyl, 1893
  - Burcatelia Sjöstedt, 1930
  - Clepsydria Sjöstedt, 1920
  - Epallia Sjöstedt, 1921
  - Fipurga Sjöstedt, 1921
  - Goniaeoidea Sjöstedt, 1920
  - Percassa Sjöstedt, 1921
  - Perunga Sjöstedt, 1921
  - Schayera Key, 1990
- subtribe Aretzina Key, 1993 - Australia
  - Aretza Sjöstedt, 1921
  - Brachyexarna Sjöstedt, 1921
  - Exarna Brunner von Wattenwyl, 1893
  - Macrocara Uvarov, 1930
  - Terpillaria Sjöstedt, 1920
  - Zebratula Sjöstedt, 1920
- subtribe Buforaniina Key, 1993 - Australia
  - Buforania Sjöstedt, 1920
  - Cuparessa Sjöstedt, 1921
  - Phanerocerus Saussure, 1888
  - Raniliella Sjöstedt, 1921
  - Tapesta Sjöstedt, 1921
- subtribe Catantopina Brunner von Wattenwyl, 1893 - Africa, Asia, Australia
  - Catantops Schaum, 1853
  - Catantopsilus Ramme, 1929
  - Catantopsis Bolívar, 1912
  - Diabolocatantops Jago, 1984
  - Nisiocatantops Dirsh, 1953: N. orientalis (Kirby, 1888)
  - Stenocatantops Dirsh, 1953
- subtribe Cirphulina Key, 1993 - Australia
  - Chirotepica Sjöstedt, 1936
  - Cirphula Stål, 1873
  - Macrolopholia Sjöstedt, 1920
- subtribe Coryphistina Mistshenko, 1952 - Australia
  - Adreppus Sjöstedt, 1921
  - Beplessia Sjöstedt, 1921
  - Camelophistes Key, 1994
  - Charpentierella Key, 1994
  - Coryphistes Charpentier, 1845
  - Euophistes Sjöstedt, 1920
  - Macrolobalia Sjöstedt, 1921
  - Relatta Sjöstedt, 1921
  - Spectrophistes Key, 1994
- subtribe Cratilopina Key, 1993 - Australia
  - Caperrala Sjöstedt, 1921
  - Cratilopus Bolívar, 1906
  - Exarhalltia Sjöstedt, 1930
  - Typaya Sjöstedt, 1921

=== Subtribes E- ===
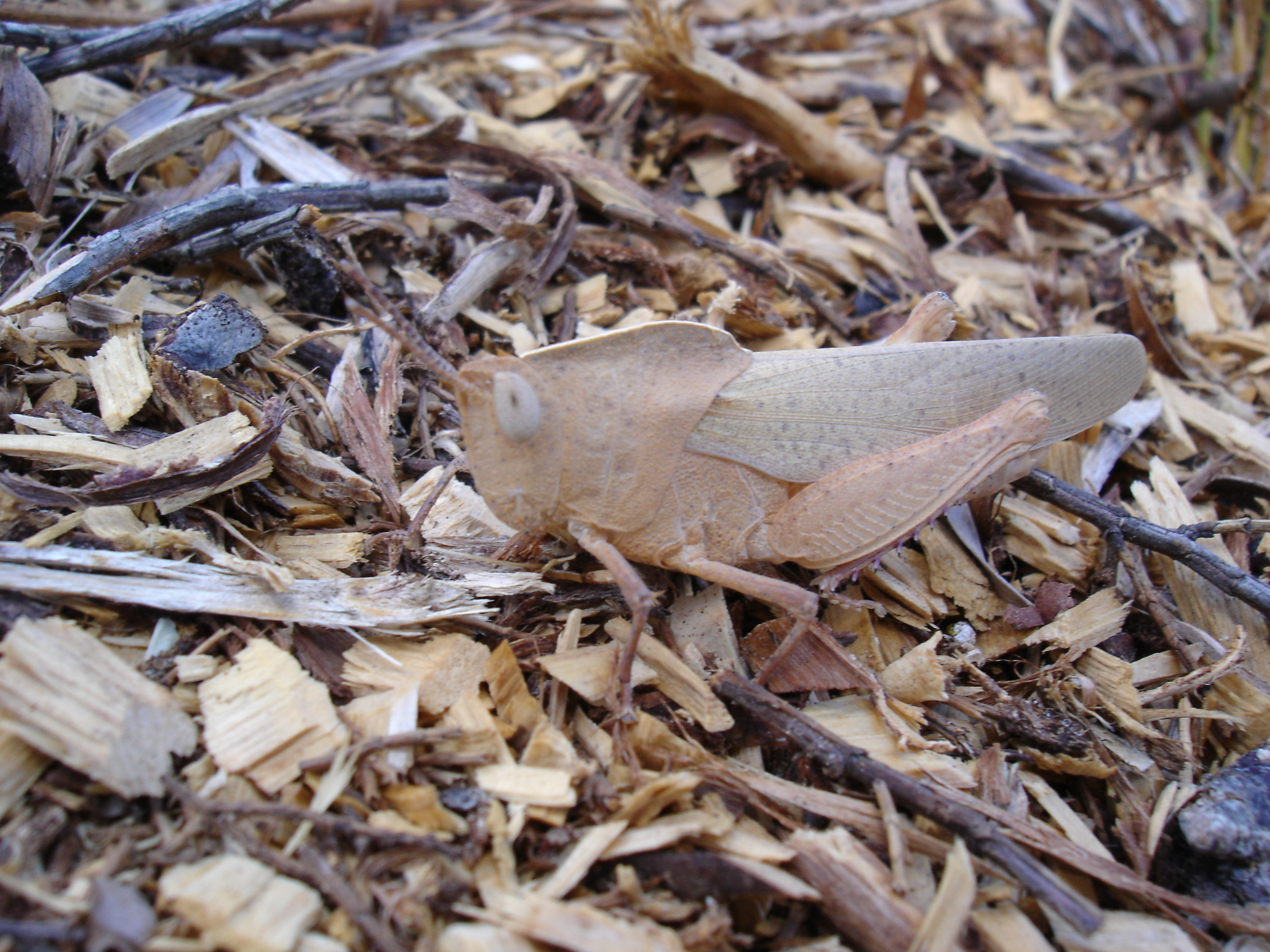
Goniaea sp.

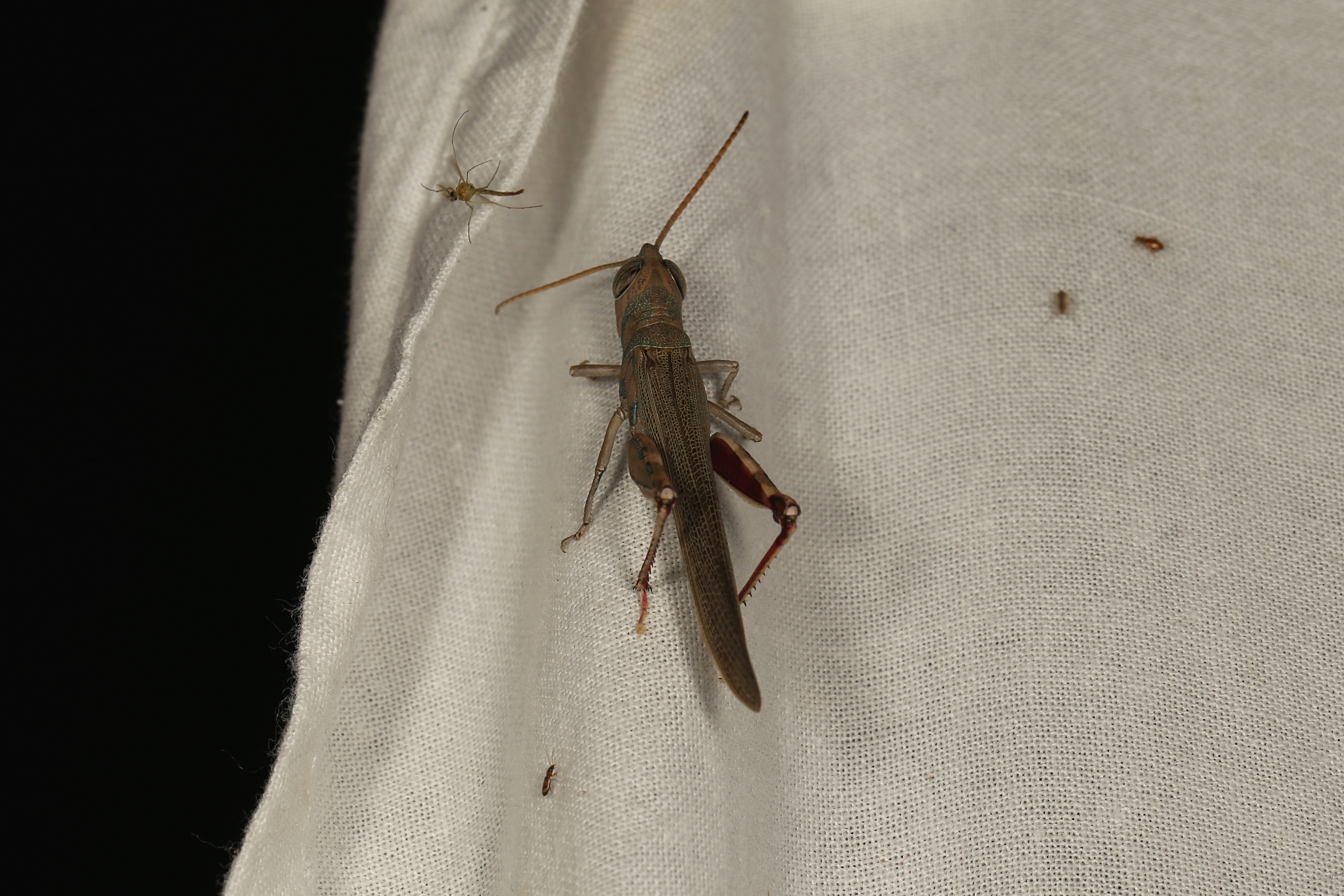
Pardillana sp.

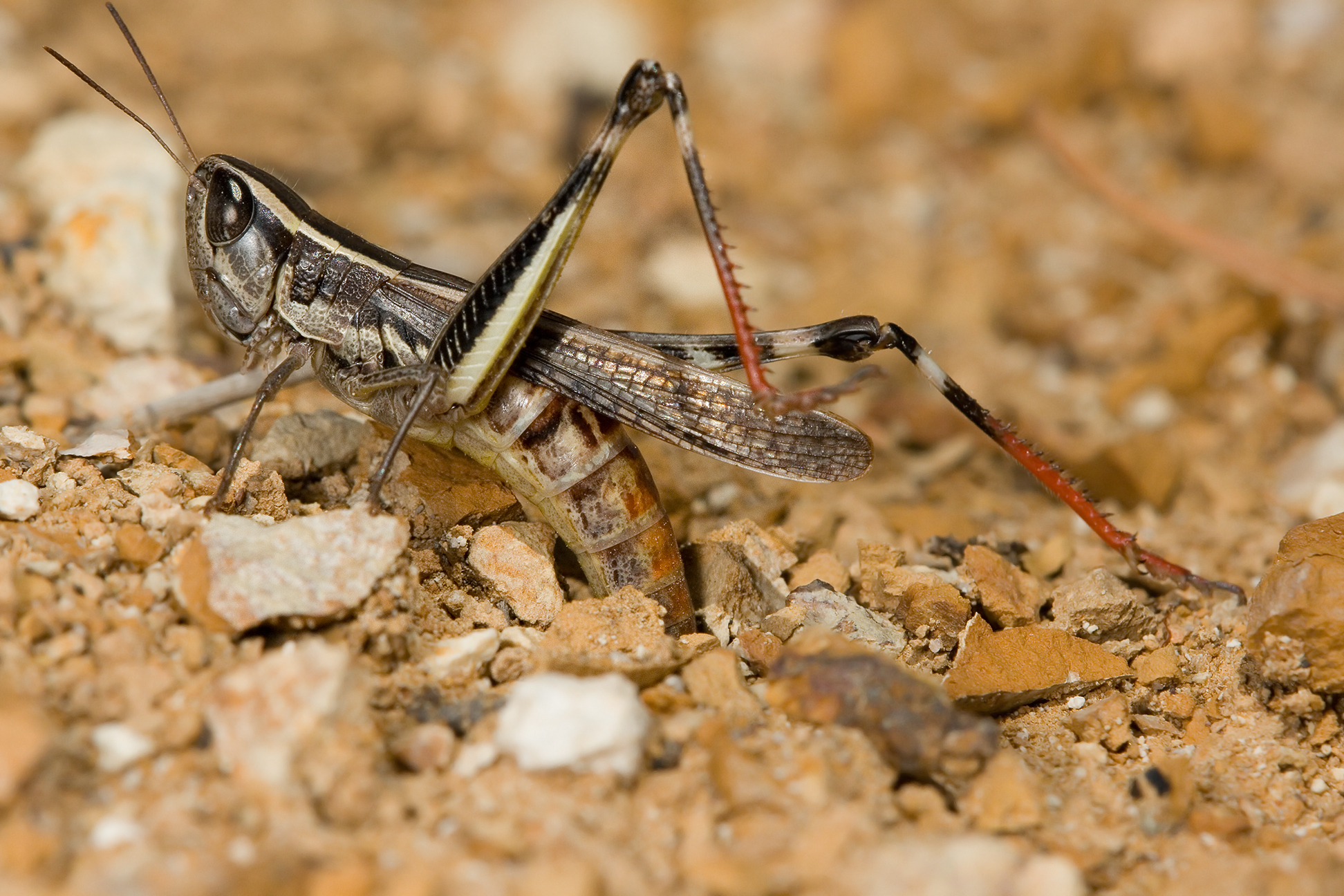
Macrotona australis, female

- subtribe Ecphantina Key, 1993 - Malesia, Australia
  - Alectorolophellus Ramme, 1941
  - Alectorolophus Brunner von Wattenwyl, 1898
  - Althaemenes Stål, 1878
  - Ecphantus Stål, 1878
  - Happarana Sjöstedt, 1920
  - Lyrolophus Ramme, 1941
  - Mengkokacris Ramme, 1941
  - Paralectorolophus Ramme, 1941
  - Sulawesiana Koçak & Kemal, 2008
- subtribe Eumecistina Key, 1993 - Australia
  - Asoramea Sjöstedt, 1921
  - Cervidia Stål, 1878
  - Erythropomala Sjöstedt, 1920
  - Eumecistes Brancsik, 1896
  - Euomopalon Sjöstedt, 1920
  - Genurellia Sjöstedt, 1931
  - Microphistes Sjöstedt, 1920
  - Pardillana Sjöstedt, 1920
  - Pespulia Sjöstedt, 1921
  - Retuspia Sjöstedt, 1921
- subtribe Goniaeina Key, 1993 - Australia (monotypic)
  - Goniaea Stål, 1873
- subtribe Hepalicina Key, 1993 - Australia (monotypic)
  - Hepalicus Sjöstedt, 1921
- subtribe Loiteriina Key, 1993 - Australia (monotypic)
  - Loiteria Sjöstedt, 1921
- subtribe Maclystriina Key, 1993 - Australia
  - Maclystria Sjöstedt, 1921
  - Perloccia Sjöstedt, 1936
- subtribe Macrazelotina Key, 1993 - Australia
  - Macrazelota Sjöstedt, 1921
  - Rusurplia Sjöstedt, 1930
- subtribe Macrotonina Key, 1993 - Australia
  - Macrotona Brunner von Wattenwyl, 1893
  - Theomolpus Bolívar, 1918
  - Xypechtia Sjöstedt, 1921
- subtribe Micreolina Key, 1993 - Australia
  - Micreola Sjöstedt, 1920
  - Sjoestedtacris Baehr, 1992
  - Sumbilvia Sjöstedt, 1921

=== Subtribes P- ===
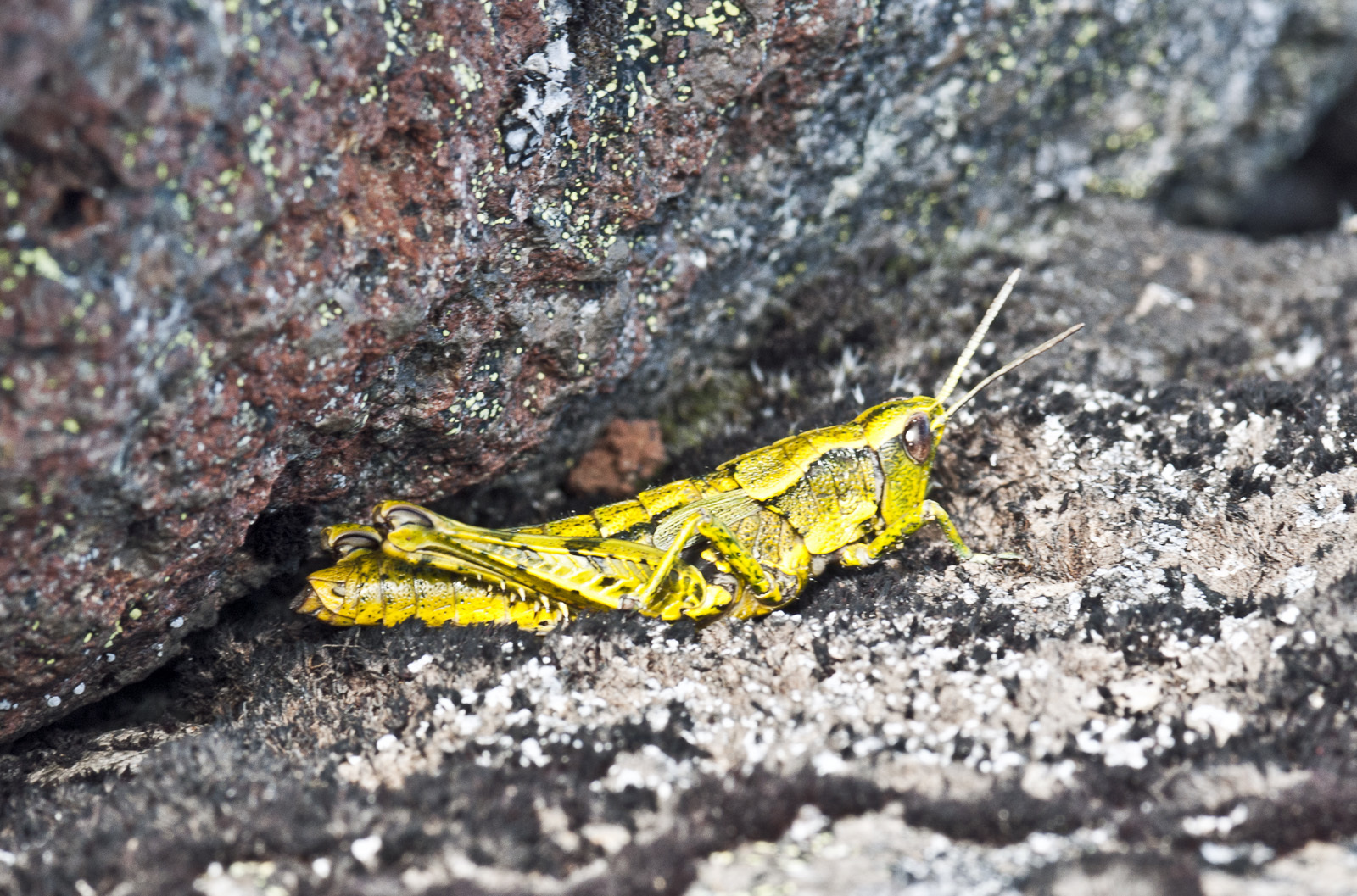
Sigaus piliferus

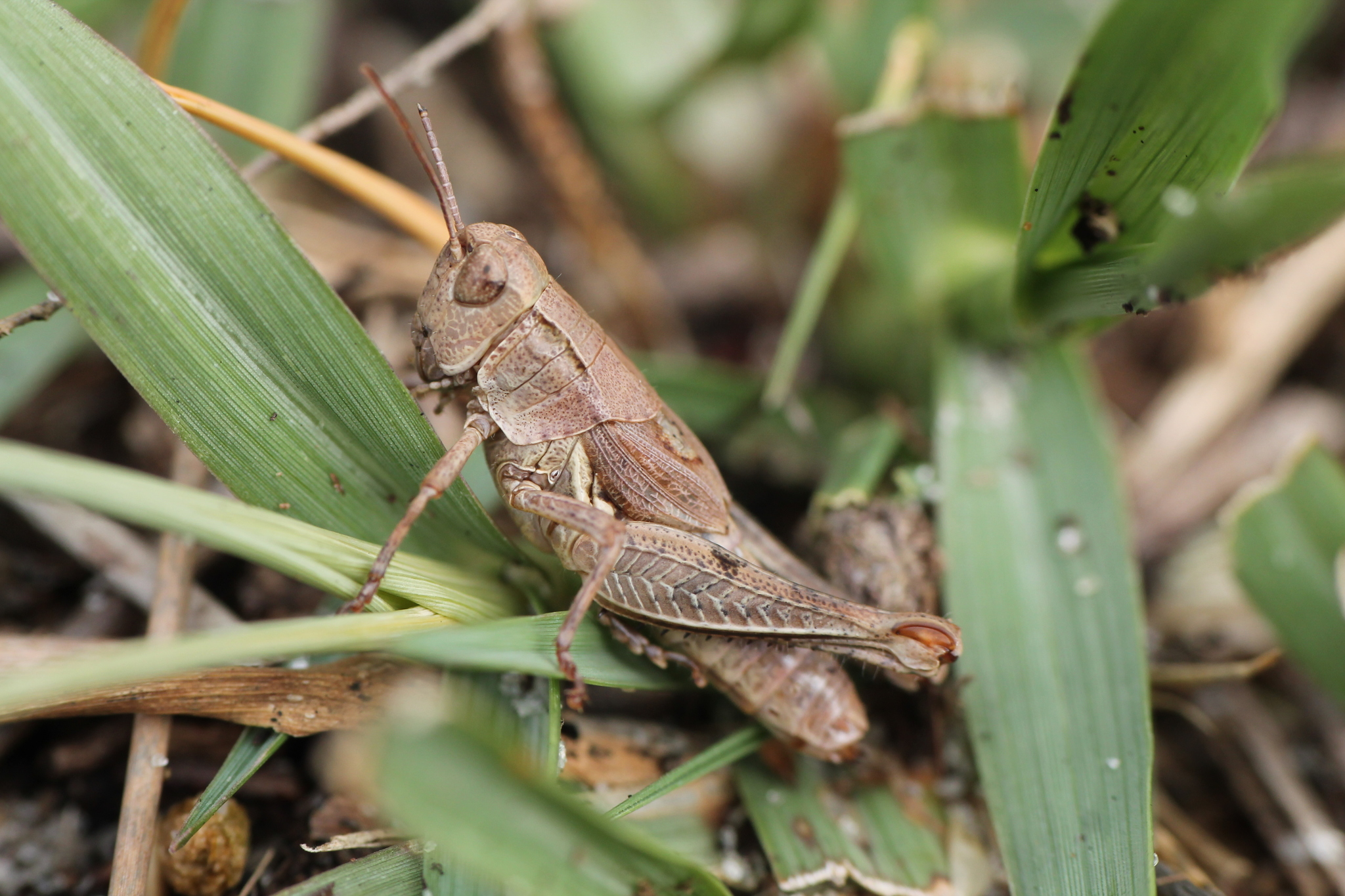
Phaulacridium marginale

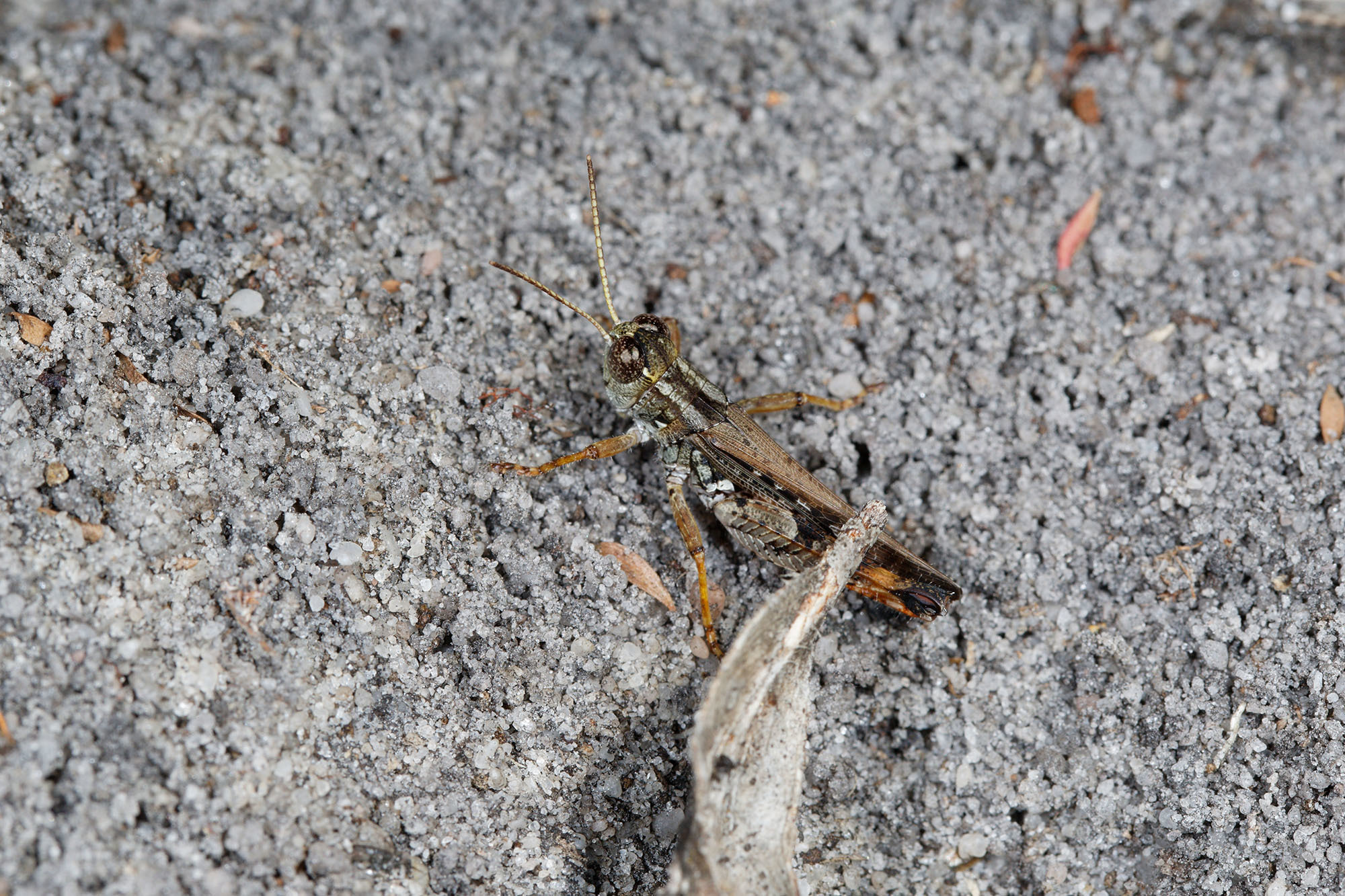
Minyacris nana, Australia

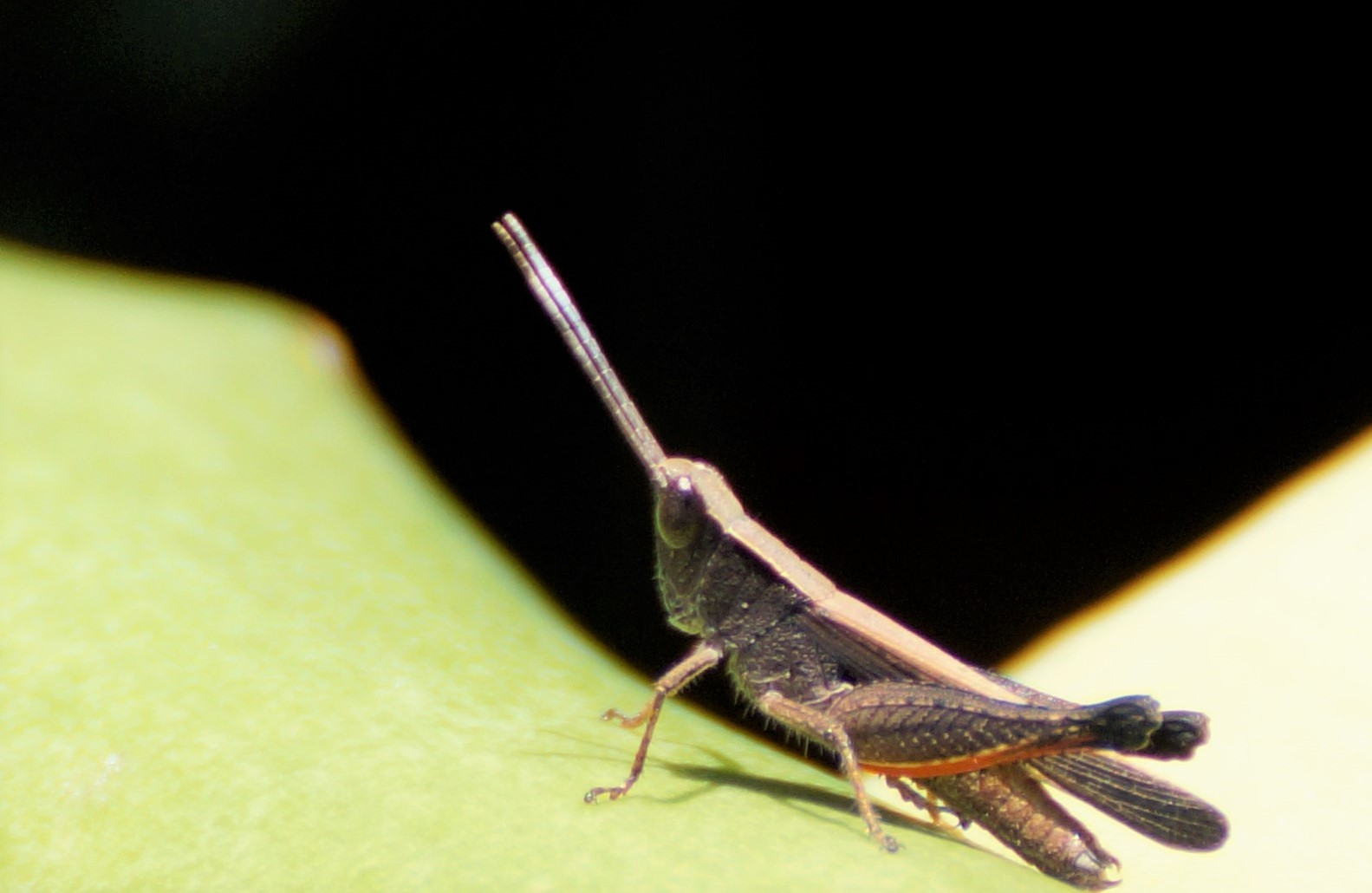
Rectitropis, Australia

- subtribe Peakesiina Key, 1993 - Australia
  - Caloptilla Sjöstedt, 1921
  - Catespa Sjöstedt, 1921
  - Cedarinia Sjöstedt, 1920
  - Cuprascula Sjöstedt, 1921
  - Curpilladia Sjöstedt, 1934
  - Desertaria Sjöstedt, 1920
  - Lagoonia Sjöstedt, 1931
  - Peakesia Sjöstedt, 1920
  - Perelytrana Sjöstedt, 1936
  - Testudinellia Sjöstedt, 1930
  - Xanterriaria Sjöstedt, 1934
  - Yrrhapta Sjöstedt, 1921
  - Zabrala Sjöstedt, 1921
- subtribe Perbelliina Key, 1993 - PNG, Australia, New Zealand
  - Ablectia Sjöstedt, 1921
  - Capraxa Sjöstedt, 1920
  - Minyacris Key, 1992
  - Perbellia Sjöstedt, 1920
  - Phaulacridium Brunner von Wattenwyl, 1893
  - Porraxia Sjöstedt, 1921
  - Rectitropis Sjöstedt, 1936
- subtribe Russalpiina Key, 1993 - Tasmania, New Zealand
  - Russalpia Sjöstedt, 1921
  - Sigaus Hutton, 1898
  - Tasmanalpina Key, 1991
  - Tasmaniacris Sjöstedt, 1932
  - Truganinia Key, 1991
- subtribe Stropina Brunner von Wattenwyl, 1893 - Australia
  - Adlappa Sjöstedt, 1920
  - Collitera Sjöstedt, 1921
  - Parazelum Sjöstedt, 1921
  - Stropis Stål, 1873
- subtribe Urnisina Key, 1993 - Australia
  - Rhitzala Sjöstedt, 1921
  - Urnisa Stål, 1861

=== subtribe not placed ===
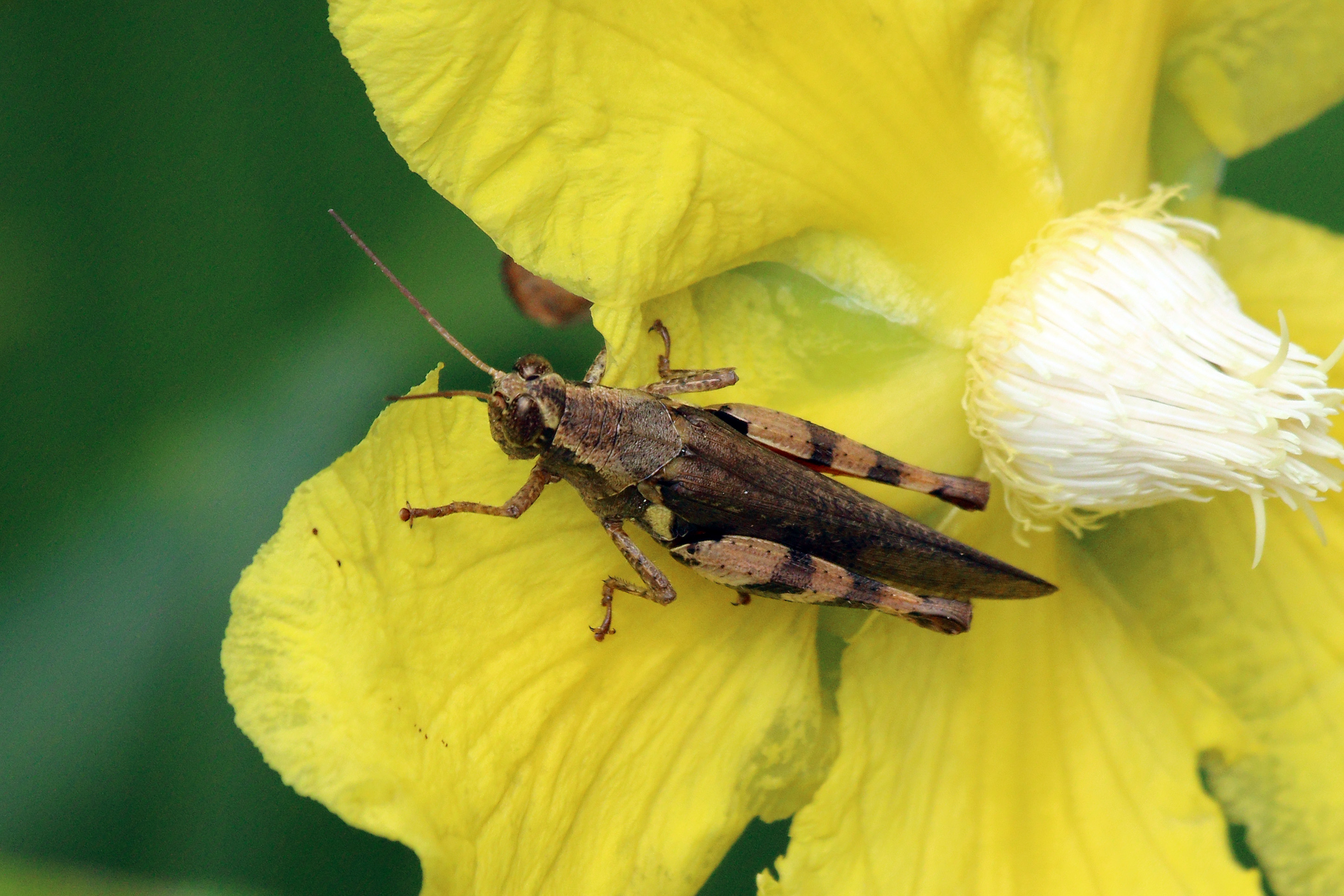
Xenocatantops humilis Borneo.

  - Dimeracris Niu & Zheng, 1993 - China
  - Phaeocatantops Dirsh, 1953 - Africa
  - Stenocrobylus Gerstaecker, 1869 - Africa, India
  - Trichocatantops Uvarov, 1953 - Africa
  - Xenocatantops Dirsh, 1953 - Africa, India, China, Indo-China, Malesia, New Guinea
