= Agesander (disambiguation) =

Agesander (Ancient Greek: Ἀγήσανδρος or Ancient Greek: Ἁγήσανδρος, Agesandros) can refer to more than one thing:

- Agesander of Rhodes, one or several sculptors who lived between about 70 BC and 70 AD, and signed "Laocoön and his Sons" in the Vatican Museums and the sculptures at Sperlonga
- Agesander (Hades), an epithet of the Greek god Hades
- Agesander (grasshopper), a genus of insects

== See also ==
- Hegesandridas or or Agesandridas
