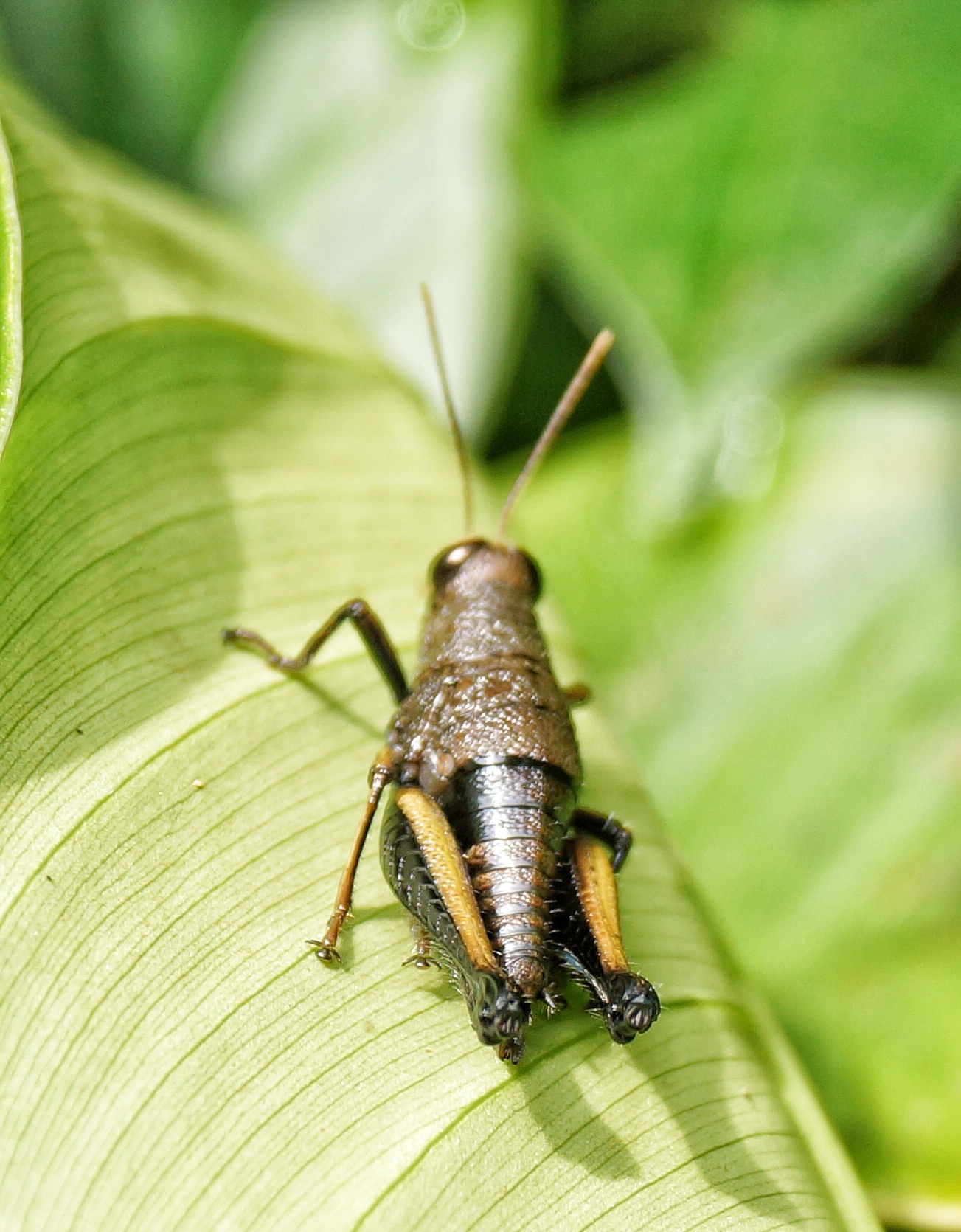
- Psiloscirtus flavipes, Ecuador

Scientific classification
- Kingdom: Animalia
- Phylum: Arthropoda
- Clade: Pancrustacea
- Class: Insecta
- Order: Orthoptera
- Suborder: Caelifera
- Family: Acrididae
- Subfamily: Ommatolampidinae
- Tribe: Abracrini
- Genus: Psiloscirtus
- Species: P. flavipes

Binomial name
- Psiloscirtus flavipes (Giglio-Tos, 1898)

Synonyms
- Ommatolampis flavipes Giglio-Tos, 1898

= Psiloscirtus flavipes =

Species of short-horned grasshopper

Psiloscirtus flavipes is a species of short-horned grasshopper in the family Acrididae. It is found in Colombia and Ecuador.
