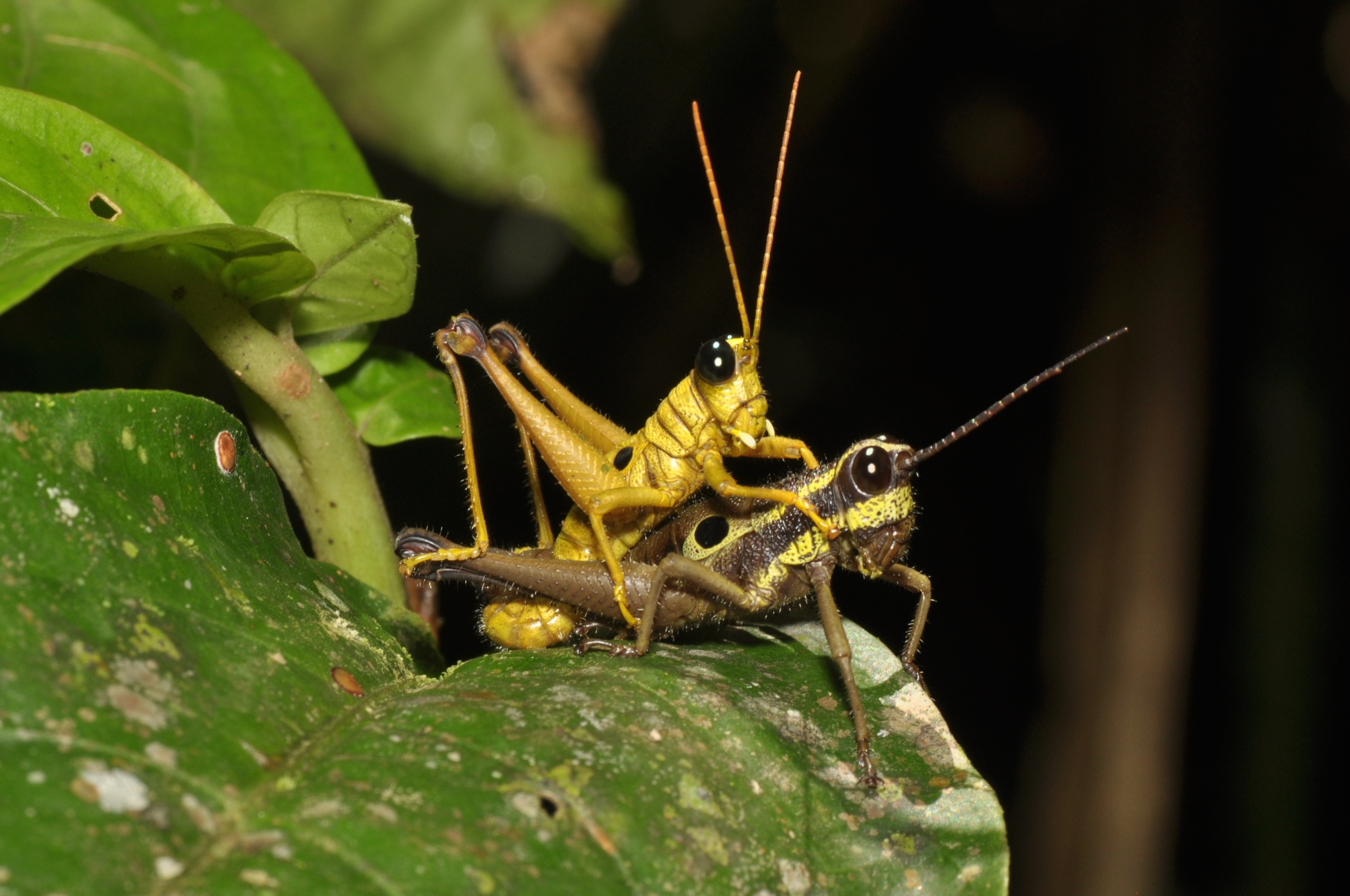
- Ommatolampis perspicillata, Ecuador

Scientific classification
- Kingdom: Animalia
- Phylum: Arthropoda
- Clade: Pancrustacea
- Class: Insecta
- Order: Orthoptera
- Suborder: Caelifera
- Family: Acrididae
- Subfamily: Ommatolampidinae
- Tribe: Ommatolampidini
- Subtribe: Ommatolampina
- Genus: Ommatolampis
- Species: O. perspicillata

Binomial name
- Ommatolampis perspicillata (Johannson, 1763)

= Ommatolampis perspicillata =

Species of grasshopper

Ommatolampis perspicillata is a species of short-horned grasshopper in the family Acrididae. It is found in South America.
