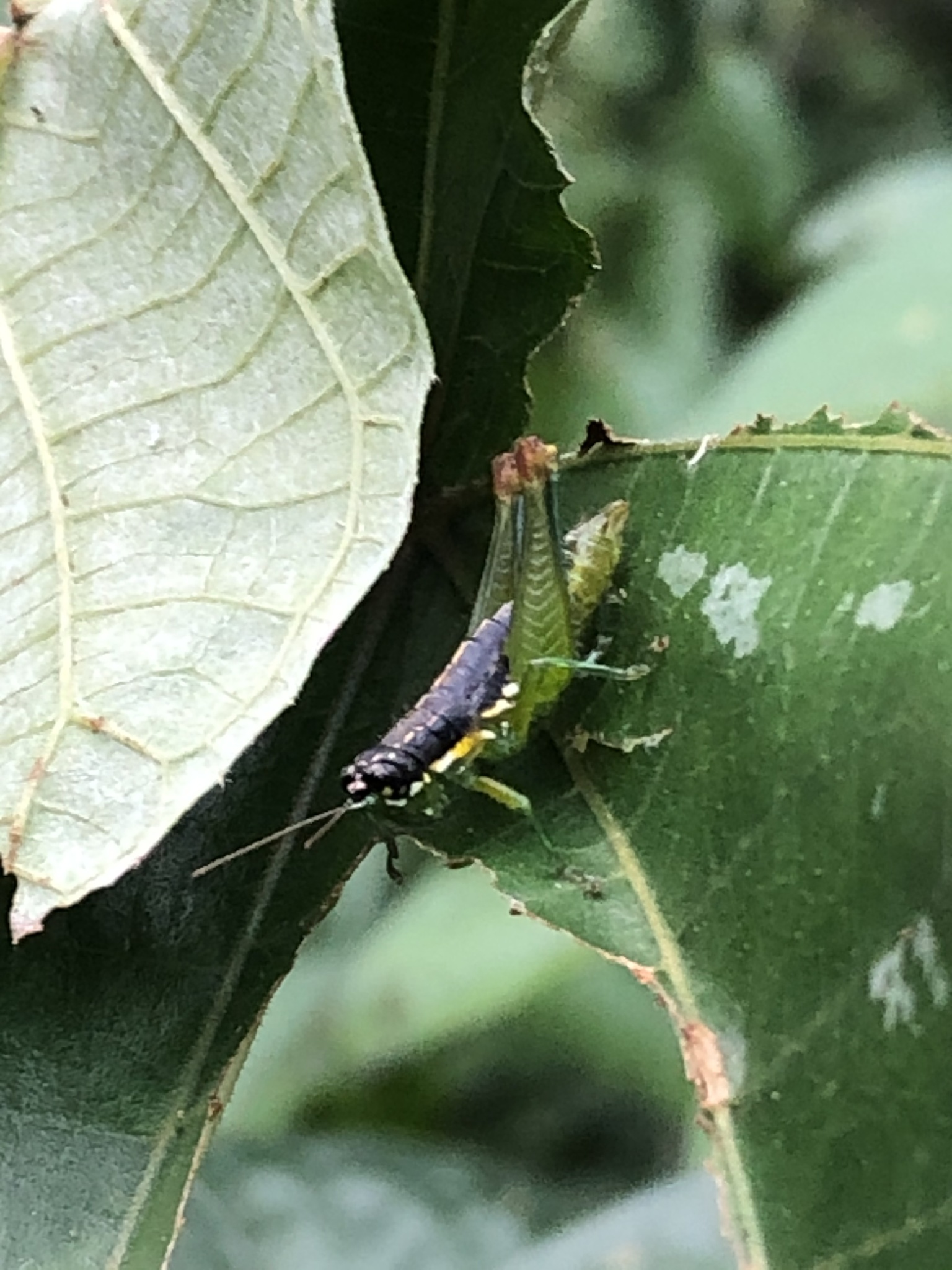
- Liebermannacris dorsualis, Peru

Scientific classification
- Kingdom: Animalia
- Phylum: Arthropoda
- Clade: Pancrustacea
- Class: Insecta
- Order: Orthoptera
- Suborder: Caelifera
- Family: Acrididae
- Subfamily: Ommatolampidinae
- Tribe: Abracrini
- Genus: Liebermannacris
- Species: L. dorsualis

Binomial name
- Liebermannacris dorsualis (Giglio-Tos, 1898)

= Liebermannacris dorsualis =

Species of short-horned grasshopper

Liebermannacris dorsualis is a species of short-horned grasshopper in the family Acrididae. It is found in South America.
