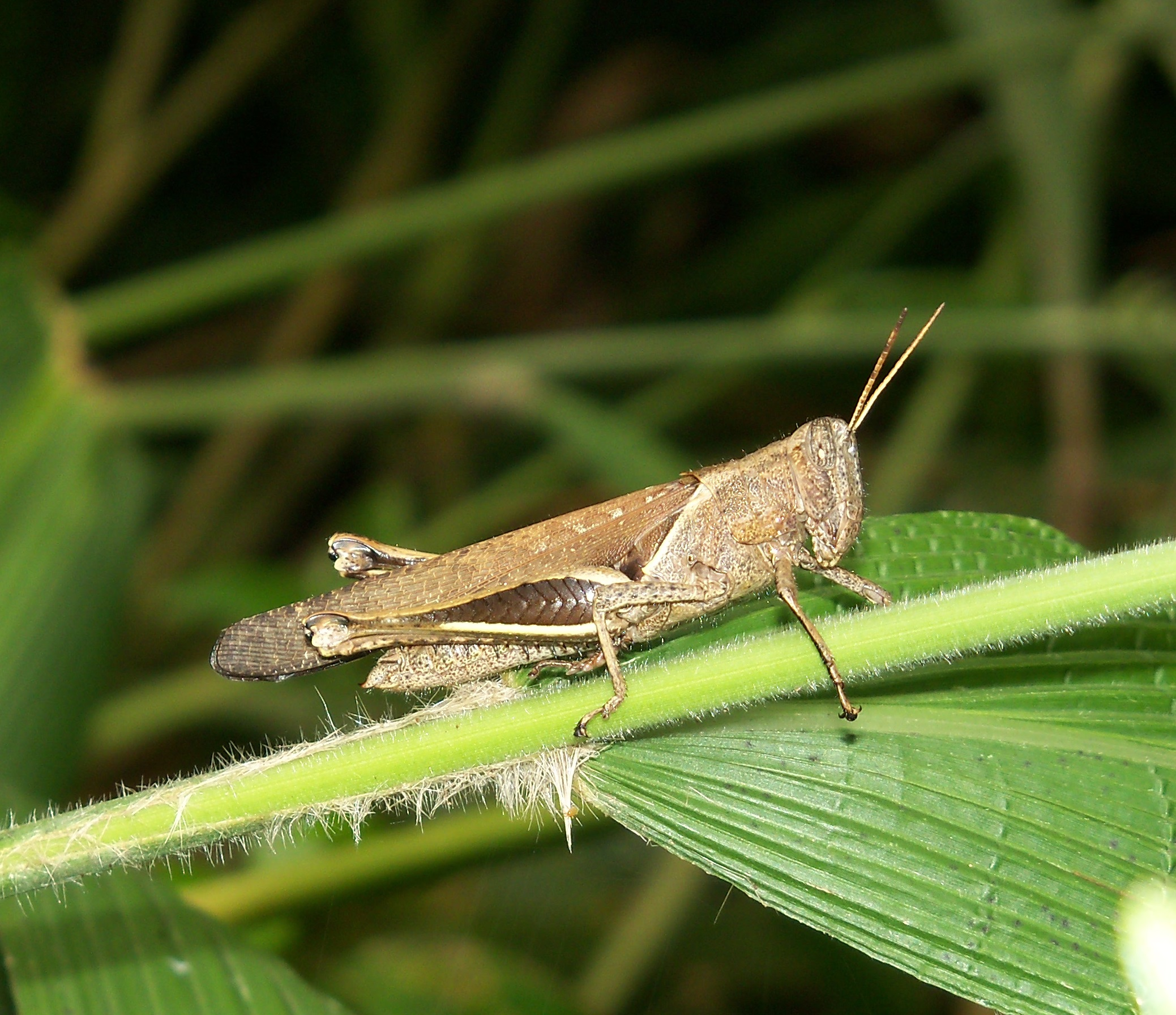
- Abracris flavolineata

Scientific classification
- Kingdom: Animalia
- Phylum: Arthropoda
- Clade: Pancrustacea
- Class: Insecta
- Order: Orthoptera
- Suborder: Caelifera
- Family: Acrididae
- Subfamily: Ommatolampidinae
- Tribe: Abracrini
- Genus: Abracris
- Species: A. flavolineata

Binomial name
- Abracris flavolineata (De Geer, 1773)

= Abracris flavolineata =

Species of grasshopper

Abracris flavolineata is a species of short-horned grasshopper in the family Acrididae, found in southern North America, Central America, and South America.
