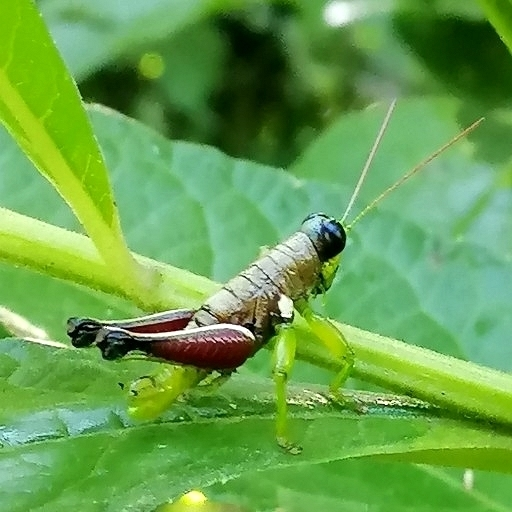
- Psiloscirtus bolivianus, Bolivia

Scientific classification
- Kingdom: Animalia
- Phylum: Arthropoda
- Clade: Pancrustacea
- Class: Insecta
- Order: Orthoptera
- Suborder: Caelifera
- Family: Acrididae
- Subfamily: Ommatolampidinae
- Tribe: Abracrini
- Genus: Psiloscirtus
- Species: P. bolivianus

Binomial name
- Psiloscirtus bolivianus (Bruner, 1920)

Synonyms
- Rhytidochrota boliviana Bruner, 1920

= Psiloscirtus bolivianus =

Species of short-horned grasshopper

Psiloscirtus bolivianus is a species of short-horned grasshopper in the family Acrididae. It is found in Bolivia.
