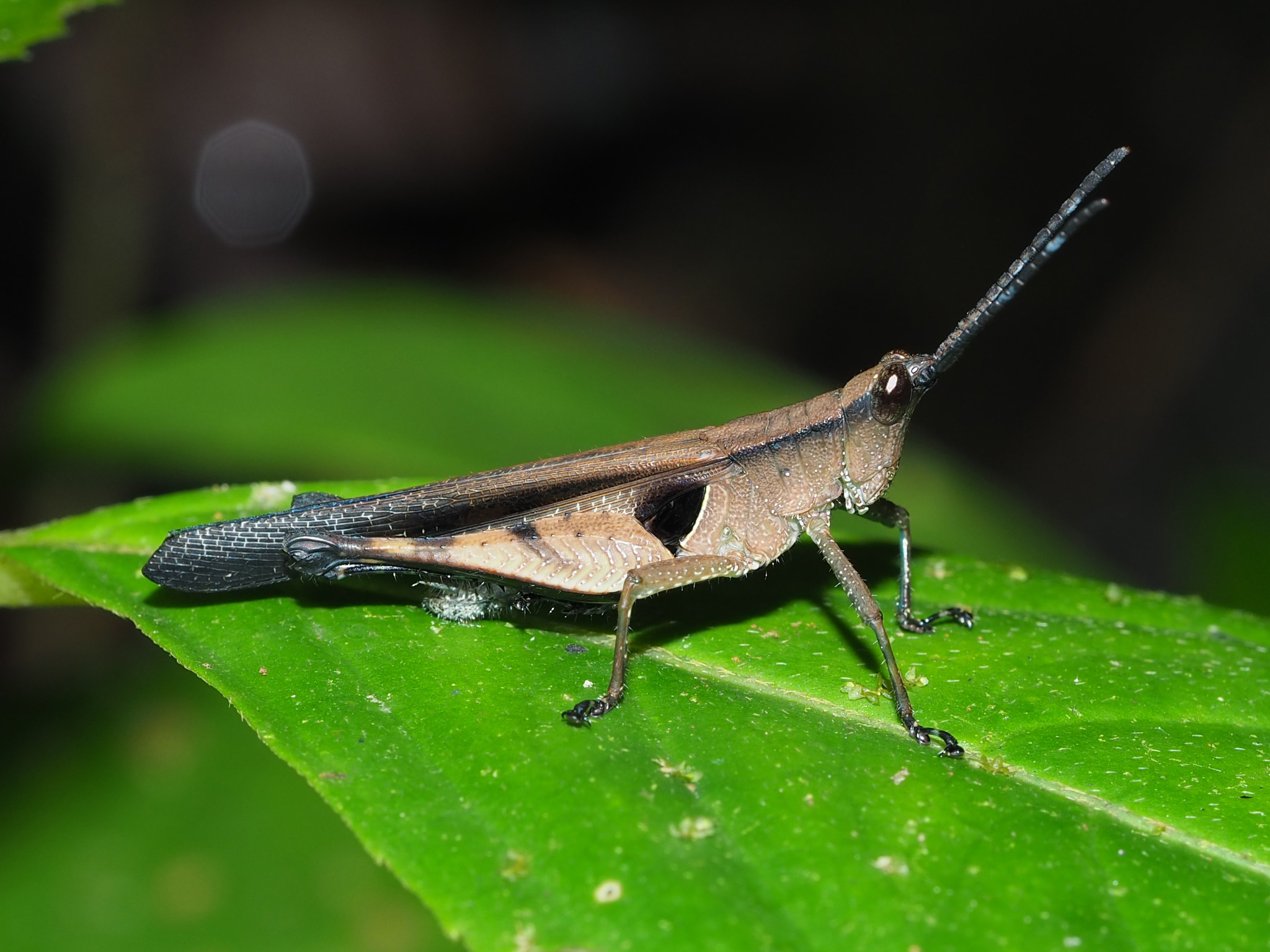
- Xiphiola cyanoptera, Ecuador

Scientific classification
- Kingdom: Animalia
- Phylum: Arthropoda
- Clade: Pancrustacea
- Class: Insecta
- Order: Orthoptera
- Suborder: Caelifera
- Family: Acrididae
- Subfamily: Ommatolampidinae
- Tribe: Abracrini
- Genus: Xiphiola
- Species: X. cyanoptera

Binomial name
- Xiphiola cyanoptera (Gerstaecker, 1889)

= Xiphiola cyanoptera =

Species of short-horned grasshopper

Xiphiola cyanoptera is a species of short-horned grasshopper in the family Acrididae. It is found in South America.
