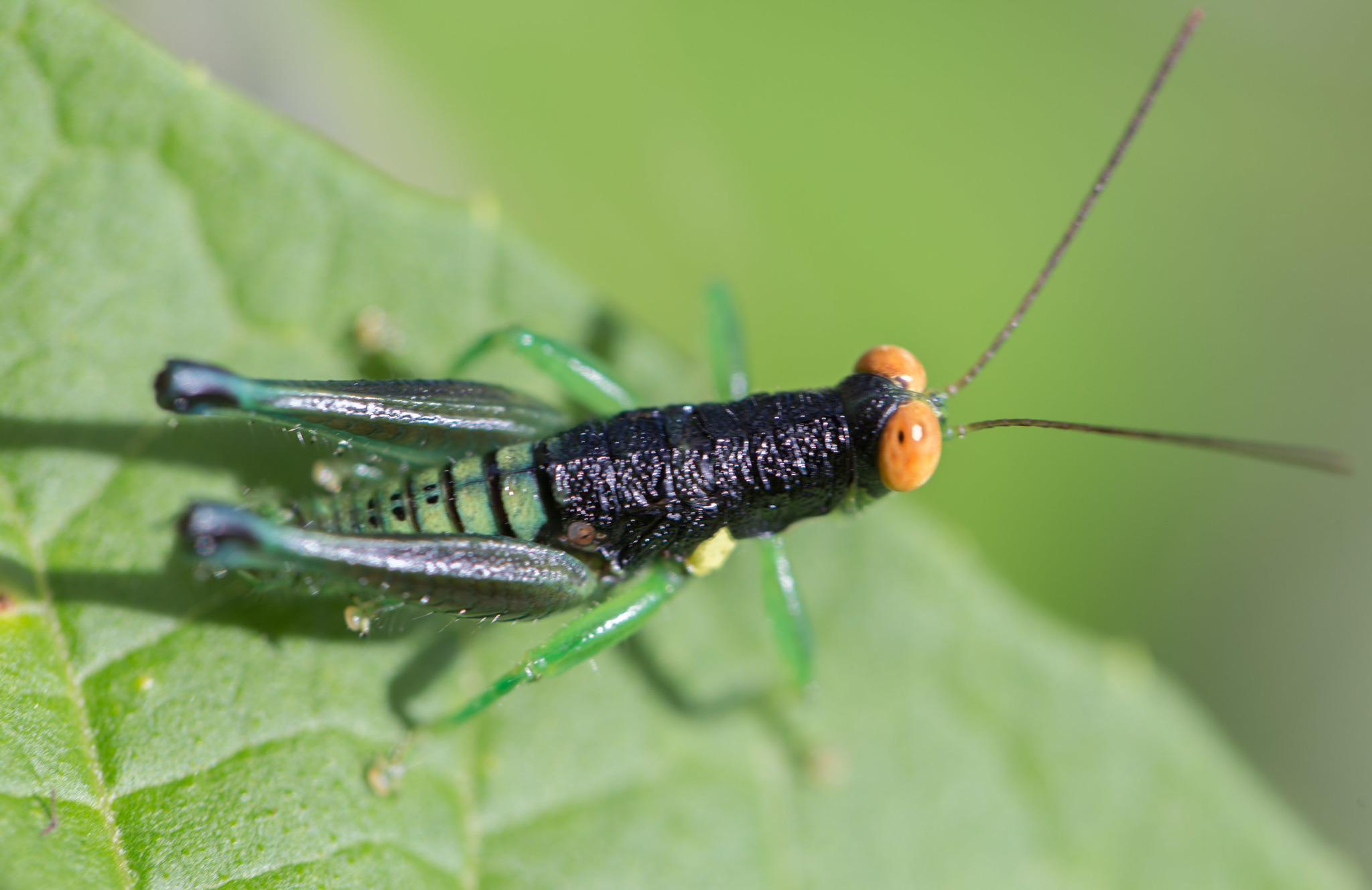
- Psiloscirtus apterus, Ecuador

Scientific classification
- Kingdom: Animalia
- Phylum: Arthropoda
- Clade: Pancrustacea
- Class: Insecta
- Order: Orthoptera
- Suborder: Caelifera
- Family: Acrididae
- Subfamily: Ommatolampidinae
- Tribe: Abracrini
- Genus: Psiloscirtus
- Species: P. apterus

Binomial name
- Psiloscirtus apterus (Scudder, 1875)

Synonyms
- Ommatolampis aptera Scudder, 1875

= Psiloscirtus apterus =

Species of short-horned grasshopper

Psiloscirtus apterus is a species of short-horned grasshopper in the family Acrididae. It is found in Ecuador and Peru.
