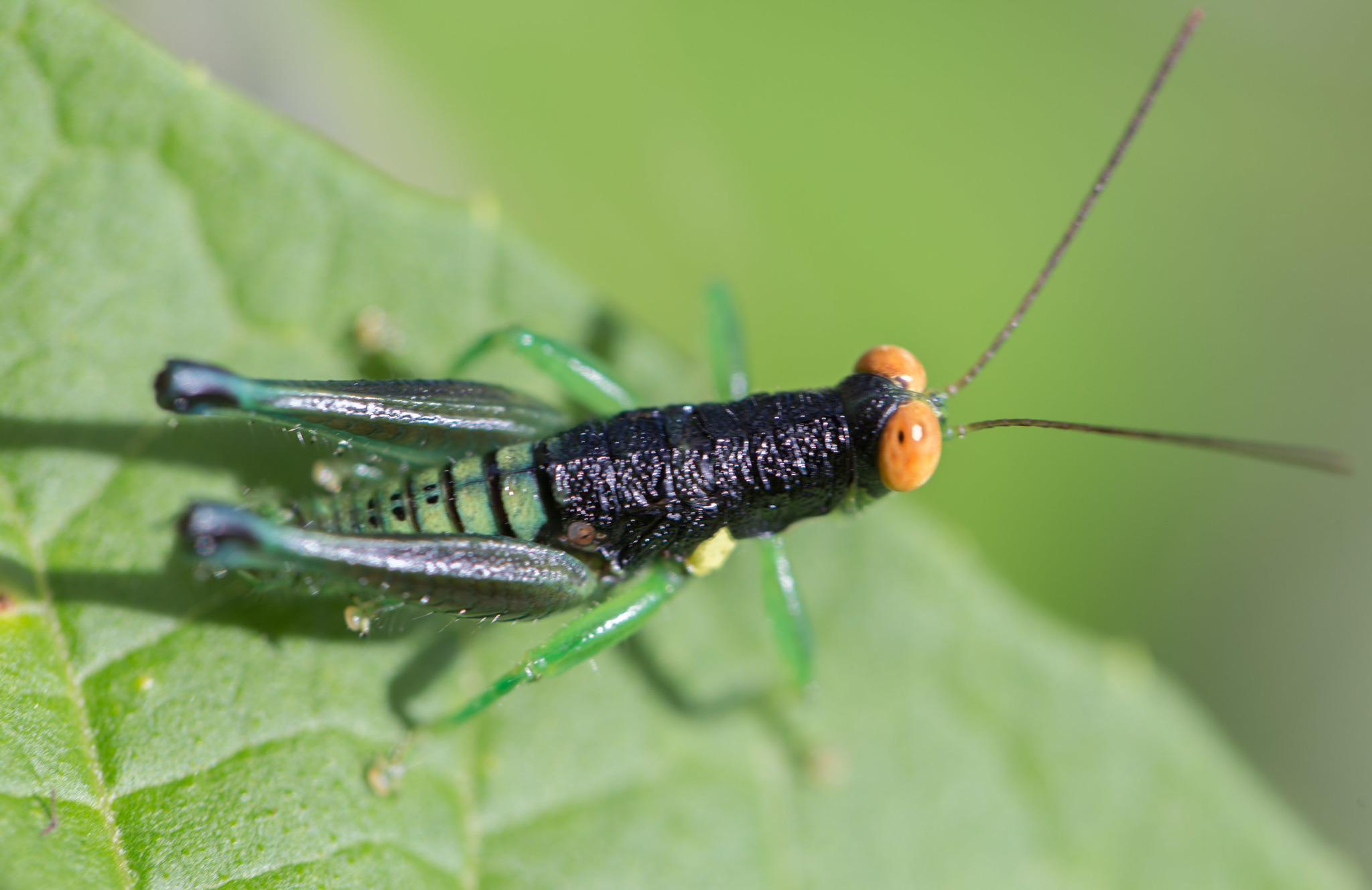
- Psiloscirtus apterus, Ecuador

Scientific classification
- Kingdom: Animalia
- Phylum: Arthropoda
- Clade: Pancrustacea
- Class: Insecta
- Order: Orthoptera
- Suborder: Caelifera
- Family: Acrididae
- Subfamily: Ommatolampidinae
- Tribe: Abracrini
- Genus: Psiloscirtus; Bruner, 1911

= Psiloscirtus =

Genus of grasshoppers

Psiloscirtus is a genus of short-horned grasshoppers in the family Acrididae. There are about seven described species in Psiloscirtus, found in Central and South America.

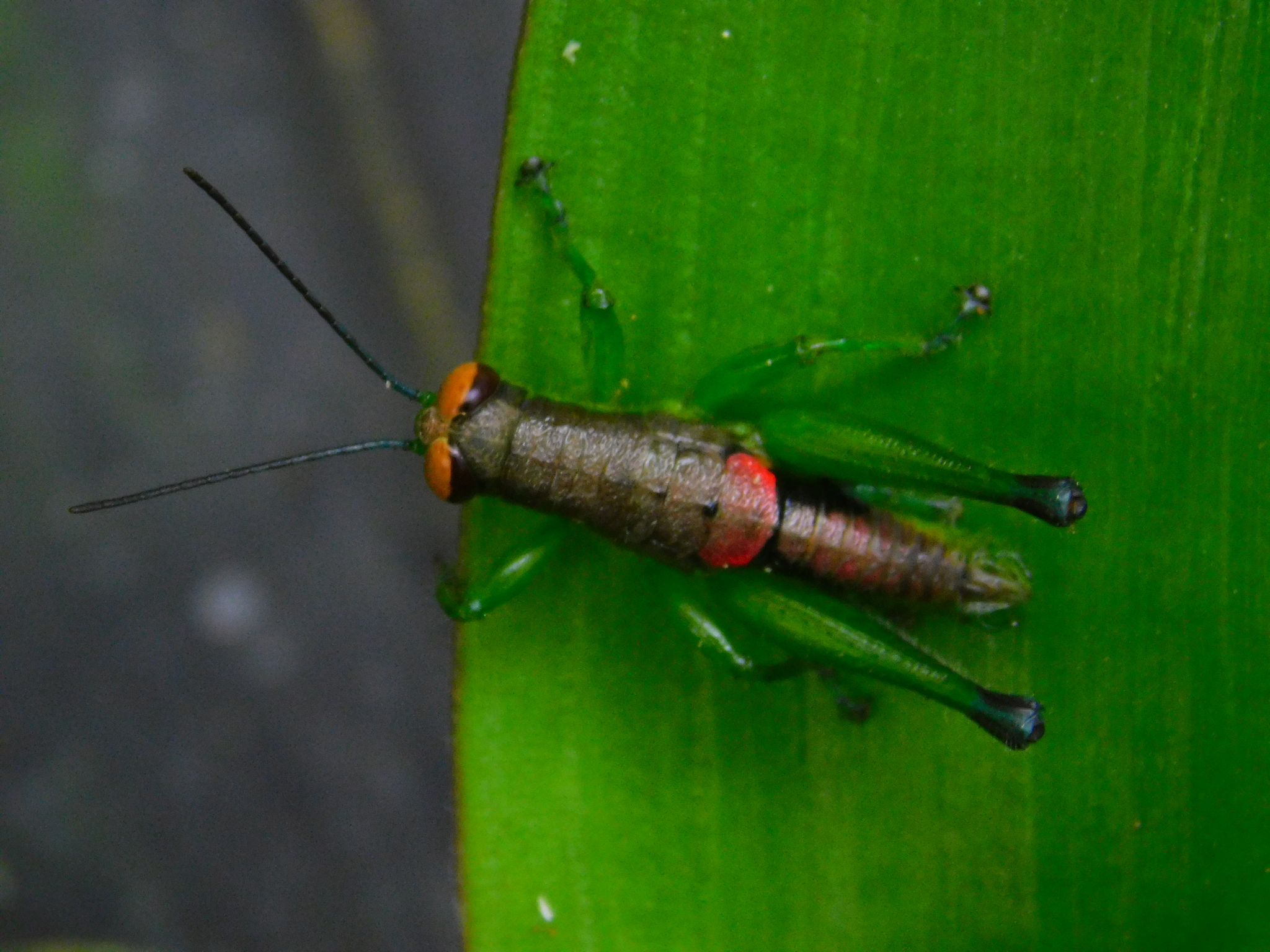
Psiloscirtus splendidus, Colombia

== Species ==
These seven species belong to the genus Psiloscirtus:

- Psiloscirtus apterus (Scudder, 1875) (Ecuador and Peru)
- Psiloscirtus bolivianus (Bruner, 1920) (Bolivia)
- Psiloscirtus debilis (Rehn, 1913) (Ecuador)
- Psiloscirtus flavipes (Giglio-Tos, 1898) (Colombia and Ecuador)
- Psiloscirtus olivaceus Bruner, 1911 (Brazil)
- Psiloscirtus peruvianus (Bruner, 1910) (Peru)
- Psiloscirtus splendidus Hebard, 1923 (Colombia)
