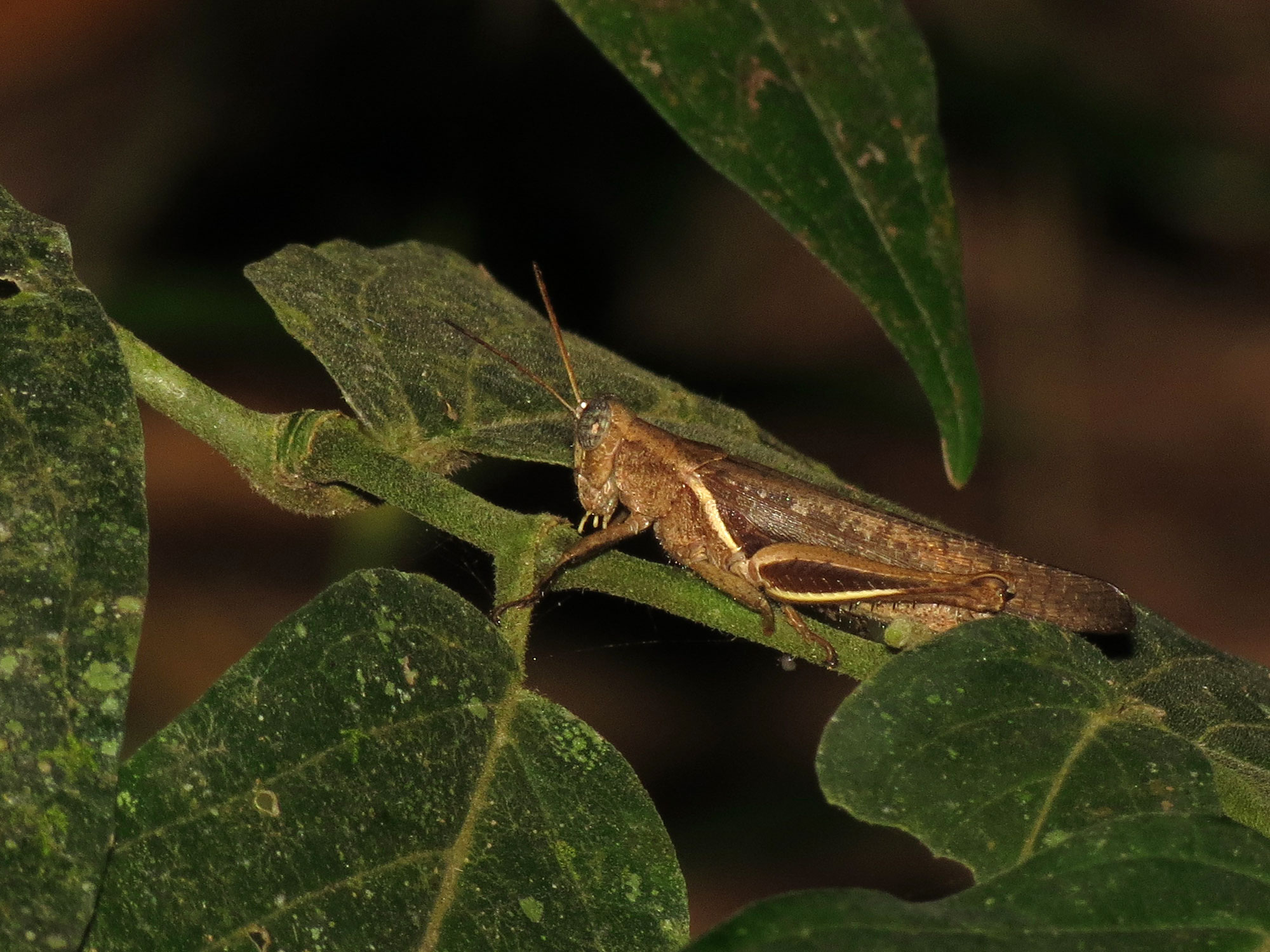
- Abracris flavolineata, Panama

Scientific classification
- Kingdom: Animalia
- Phylum: Arthropoda
- Clade: Pancrustacea
- Class: Insecta
- Order: Orthoptera
- Suborder: Caelifera
- Family: Acrididae
- Subfamily: Ommatolampidinae
- Tribe: Abracrini
- Genus: Abracris; Walker, 1870

Type species
- Abacris dilecta Walker, 1870

Synonyms
- Osmilia Stål, 1873

= Abracris =

Genus of grasshoppers

Abracris is a genus of short-horned grasshoppers in the family Acrididae. There are at least three described species in Abracris, found in North, Central, and South America.

== Species ==
These three species belong to the genus Abracris:

- Abracris bromeliae Roberts & Carbonell, 1981
- Abracris dilecta Walker, 1870
- Abracris flavolineata (De Geer, 1773)
