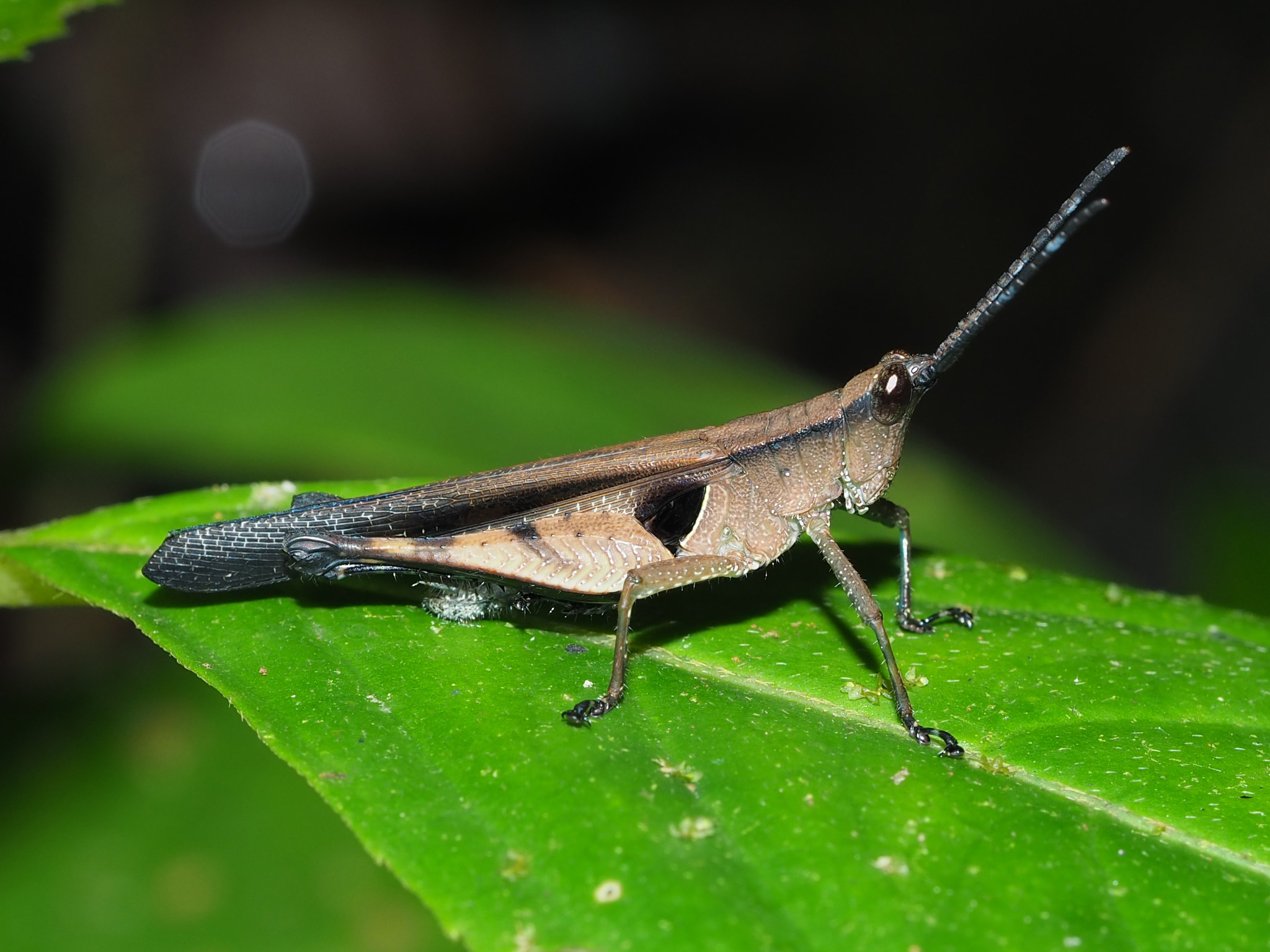
- Xiphiola cyanoptera, Ecuador

Scientific classification
- Kingdom: Animalia
- Phylum: Arthropoda
- Clade: Pancrustacea
- Class: Insecta
- Order: Orthoptera
- Suborder: Caelifera
- Family: Acrididae
- Subfamily: Ommatolampidinae
- Tribe: Abracrini
- Genus: Xiphiola; Bolívar, 1896

= Xiphiola =

Genus of grasshoppers

Xiphiola is a genus of short-horned grasshoppers in the family Acrididae. There are at least two described species in Xiphiola, found in South America.

== Species ==
These two species belong to the genus Xiphiola:

- Xiphiola borellii Giglio-Tos, 1900
- Xiphiola cyanoptera (Gerstaecker, 1889)
