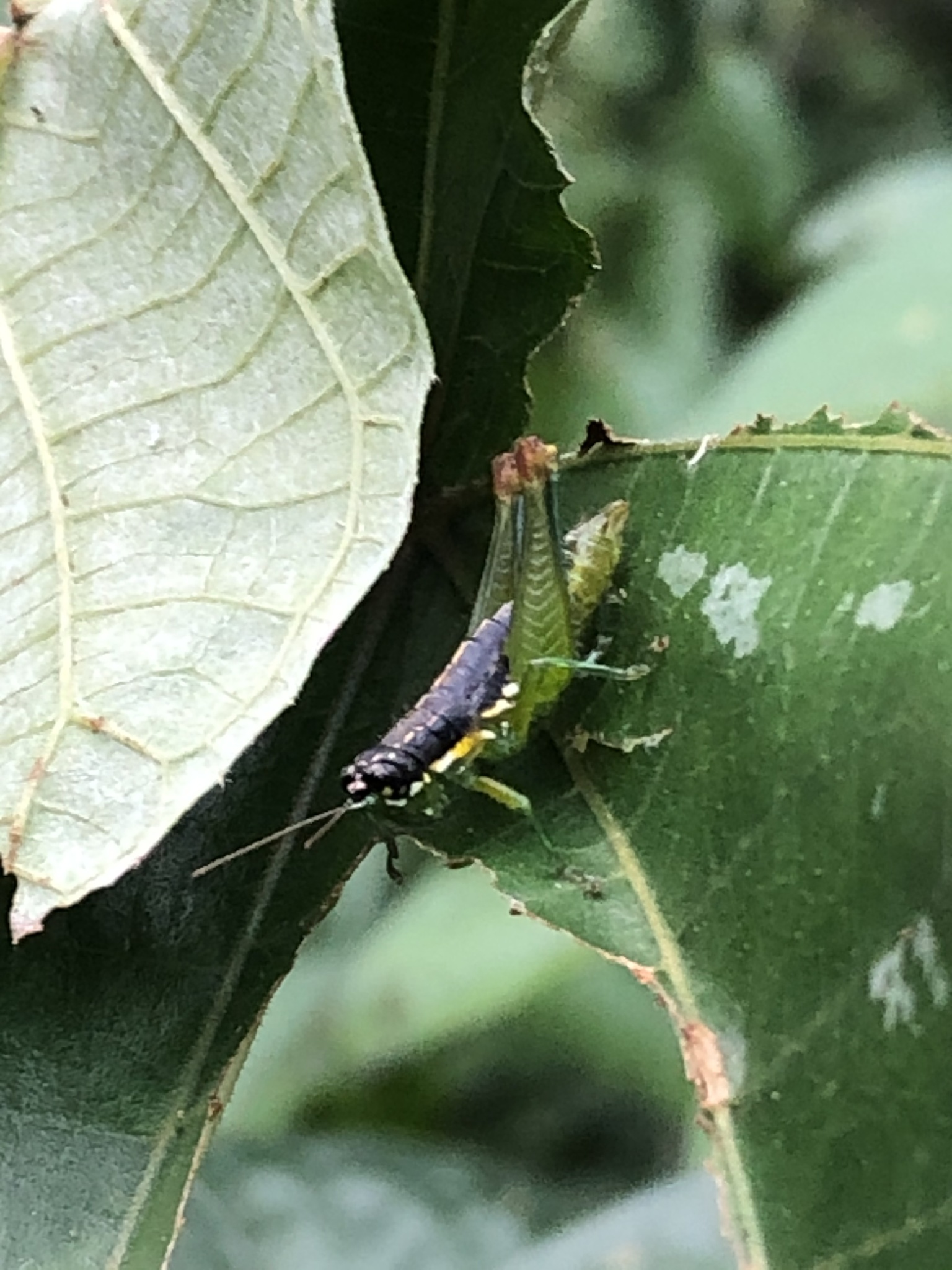
- Liebermannacris dorsualis, Peru

Scientific classification
- Kingdom: Animalia
- Phylum: Arthropoda
- Clade: Pancrustacea
- Class: Insecta
- Order: Orthoptera
- Suborder: Caelifera
- Family: Acrididae
- Subfamily: Ommatolampidinae
- Tribe: Abracrini
- Genus: Liebermannacris; Matiotti da Costa & Silva Carvalho, 2006

= Liebermannacris =

Genus of grasshoppers

Liebermannacris is a genus of short-horned grasshoppers in the family Acrididae. There are at least two described species in Liebermannacris, found in South America.

== Species ==
These species belong to the genus Liebermannacris:

- Liebermannacris dorsualis (Giglio-Tos, 1898)
- Liebermannacris punctifrons (Stål, 1878)
