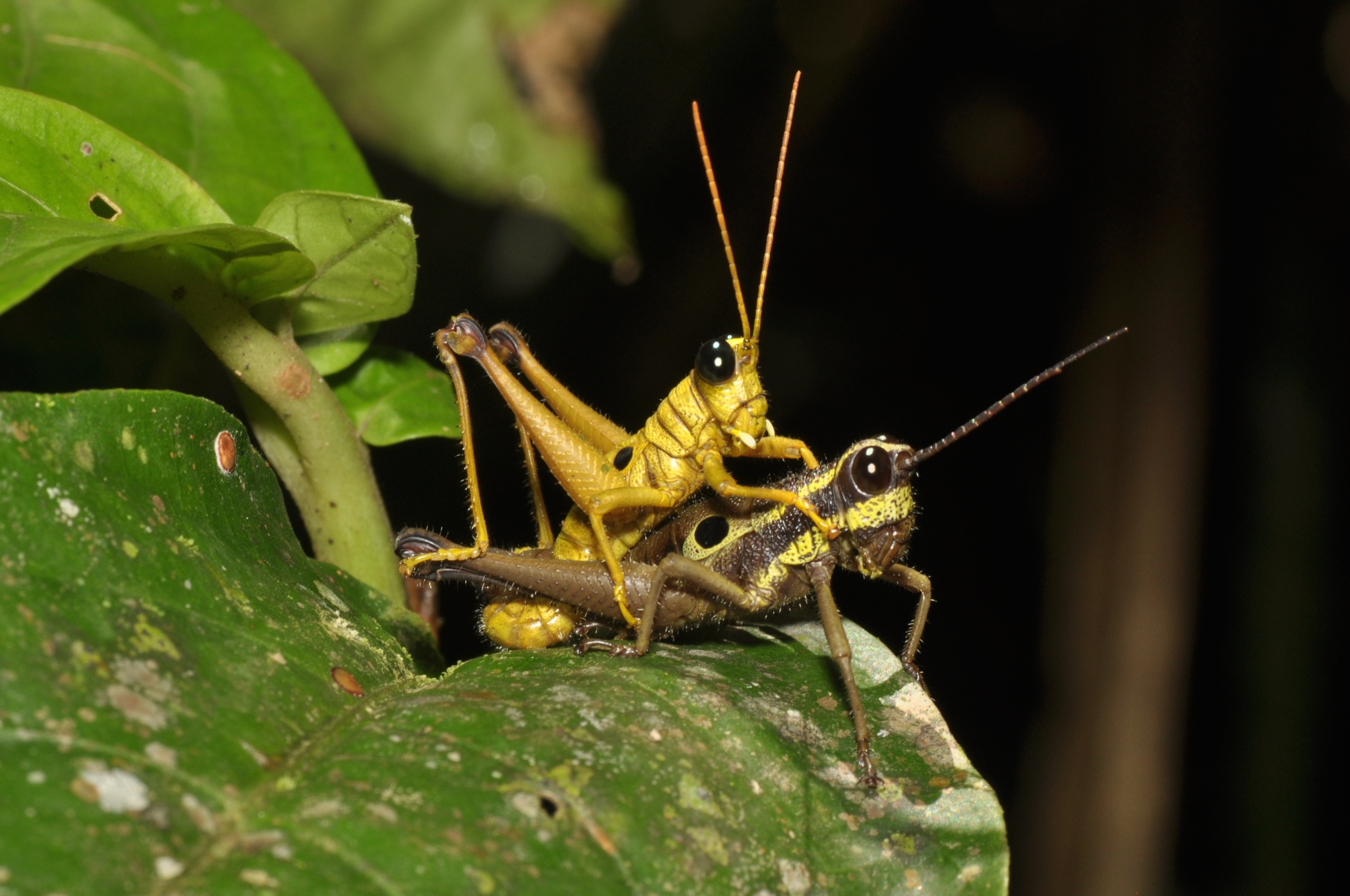
- Ommatolampis perspicillata, Ecuador

Scientific classification
- Kingdom: Animalia
- Phylum: Arthropoda
- Clade: Pancrustacea
- Class: Insecta
- Order: Orthoptera
- Suborder: Caelifera
- Family: Acrididae
- Subfamily: Ommatolampidinae
- Tribe: Ommatolampidini
- Subtribe: Ommatolampina
- Genus: Ommatolampis; Burmeister, 1838

= Ommatolampis =

Genus of grasshoppers

Ommatolampis is a genus of short-horned grasshoppers in the family Acrididae. There are at least four described species in Ommatolampis, found in South America.

== Species ==
These species belong to the genus Ommatolampis:

- Ommatolampis equatoriana Carbonell & Descamps, 1978
- Ommatolampis pazii Bolívar, 1881
- Ommatolampis perspicillata (Johannson, 1763)
- Ommatolampis quadrimaculata Carbonell & Descamps, 1978
