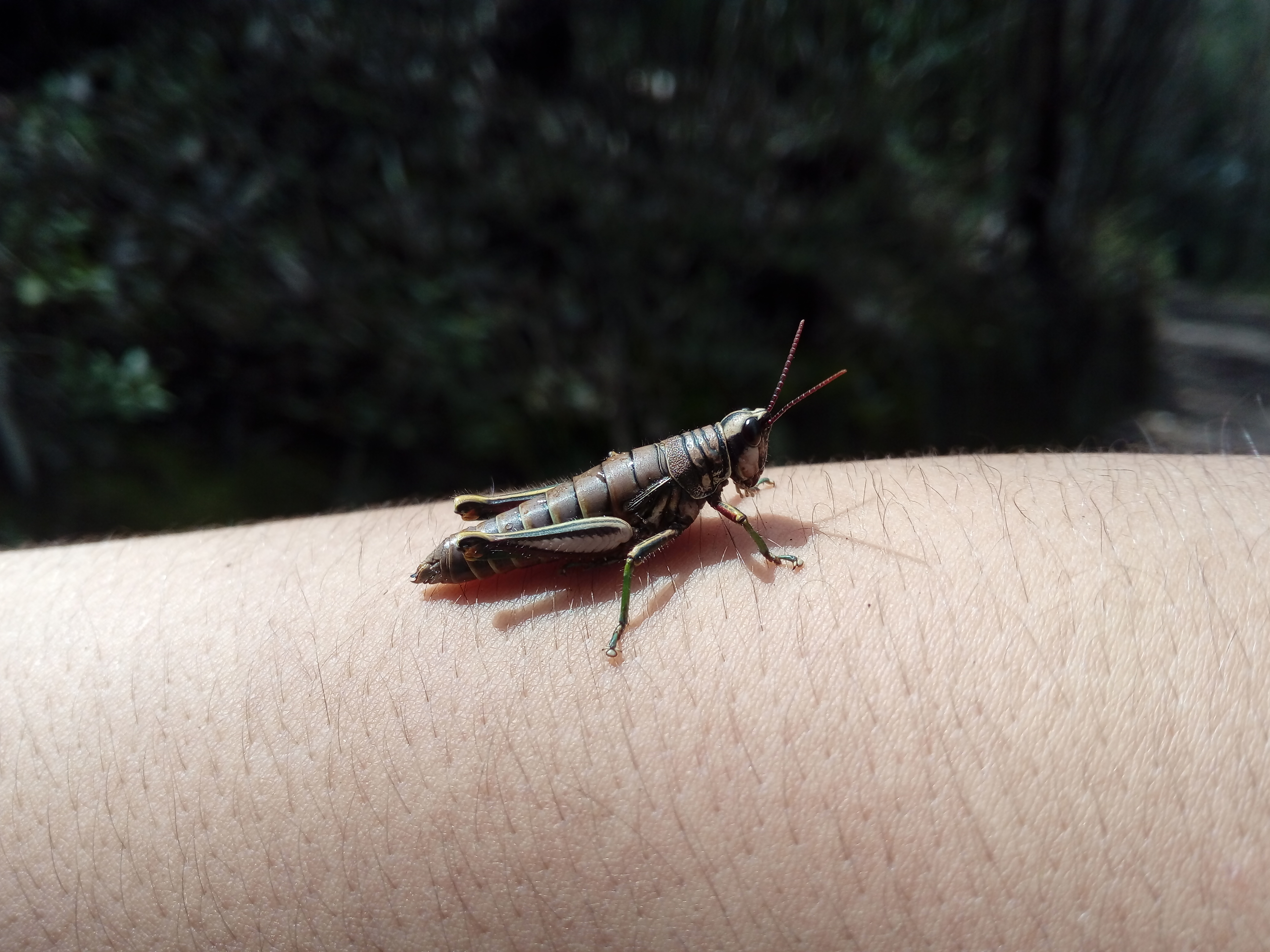
- Agesander ruficornis, Colombia

Scientific classification
- Kingdom: Animalia
- Phylum: Arthropoda
- Clade: Pancrustacea
- Class: Insecta
- Order: Orthoptera
- Suborder: Caelifera
- Family: Acrididae
- Subfamily: Ommatolampidinae
- Tribe: Abracrini
- Genus: Agesander; Stål, 1878
- Species: A. ruficornis

Binomial name
- Agesander ruficornis Stål, 1878

= Agesander ruficornis =

Genus of grasshoppers

Agesander is a genus of short-horned grasshopper in the family Acrididae. It contains a singles species, Agesander ruficornis, found in northern South America. It was described by Carl Stål 1878.
