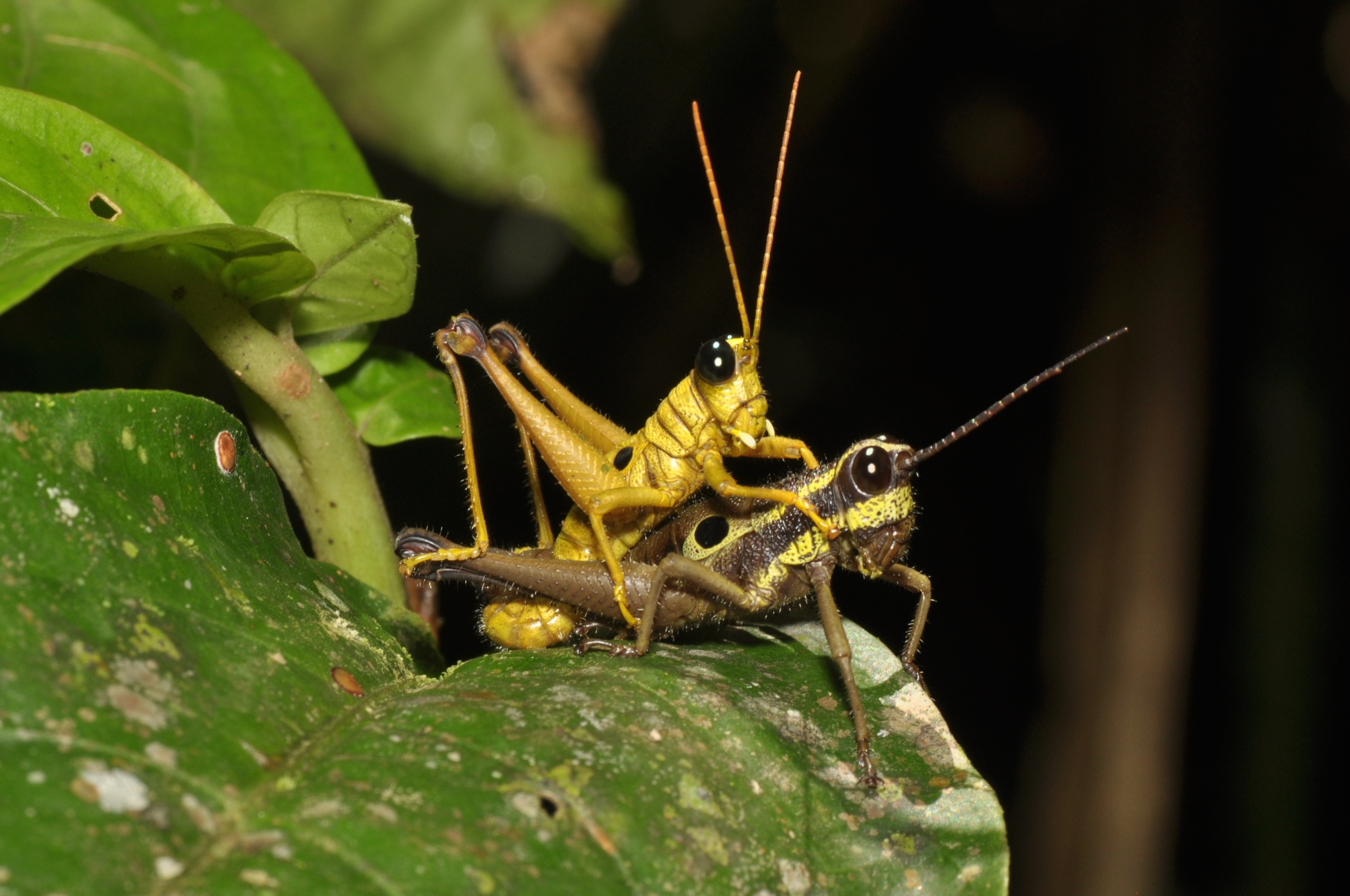
- Ommatolampis perspicillata, Ecuador

Scientific classification
- Kingdom: Animalia
- Phylum: Arthropoda
- Clade: Pancrustacea
- Class: Insecta
- Order: Orthoptera
- Suborder: Caelifera
- Family: Acrididae
- Subfamily: Ommatolampidinae; Brunner von Wattenwyl, 1893

Synonyms
- Ommatolampinae Brunner von Wattenwyl, 1893

= Ommatolampidinae =

Subfamily of grasshoppers

The Ommatolampidinae are a subfamily of grasshoppers in the family Acrididae, found in central and South America, and based on the type genus Ommatolampis. Derived from the "Ommatolampides" used by Brunner von Wattenwyl in 1893, the first use of the name in its current form was by Rodríguez et al. in 2013; this taxon appears to be paraphyletic.

== Tribes and genera ==
The Orthoptera Species File lists seven tribes and currently includes over 115 genera:

=== Abracrini ===
Authority: Amédégnato, 1974

1. Abracris Walker, 1870
2. Agesander Stål, 1878
3. Arimacris Matiotti da Costa & Silva Carvalho, 2006
4. Caruaruacris Matiotti da Costa & Silva Carvalho, 2006
5. Eujivarus Bruner, 1911
6. Eusitalces Bruner, 1911
7. Ixalotettix Amédégnato & Descamps, 1979
8. Jodacris Giglio-Tos, 1897
9. Liebermannacris Matiotti da Costa & Silva Carvalho, 2006
10. Monneacris Amédégnato & Descamps, 1979
11. Omalotettix Bruner, 1906
12. Orthoscapheus Bruner, 1906
13. Parasitalces Bruner, 1911
14. Psiloscirtus Bruner, 1911
15. Rhachicreagra Rehn, 1905
16. Robustusacris Matiotti da Costa & Silva Carvalho, 2006
17. Roppacris Amédégnato & Descamps, 1979
18. Salvadoracris Matiotti da Costa & Silva Carvalho, 2006
19. Sitalces (grasshopper) Stål, 1878
20. Teinophaus Bruner, 1908
21. Xiphiola Bolívar, 1896

=== Aspidophymini ===
Authority: Bolívar, 1884

1. Aspidophyma Bolívar, 1884
2. Loepacris Descamps & Amédégnato, 1973
3. Malezacris Amédégnato & Poulain, 1998
4. Thamnacris Descamps & Amédégnato, 1972

=== Clematodinini ===
Authority: Amédégnato, 1974

1. Clematodina Günther, 1940
2. Rehnuciera Carbonell, 1969

=== Ommatolampidini ===
Authority: Brunner von Wattenwyl, 1893

subtribe Ommatolampina Brunner von Wattenwyl, 1893

1. Dicaearchus (grasshopper) Stål, 1878
2. Episomacris Carbonell & Descamps, 1978
3. Eucosmetacris Carbonell & Descamps, 1978
4. Eulampiacris Carbonell & Descamps, 1978
5. Hippariacris Carbonell & Descamps, 1978
6. Kyphiacris Carbonell & Descamps, 1978
7. Lamiacris Carbonell & Descamps, 1978
8. Leptopteracris Carbonell & Descamps, 1978
9. Muriciacris Matiotti da Costa, 2014
10. Nepiopteracris Carbonell & Descamps, 1978
11. Ommatolampis Burmeister, 1838
12. Peruana Koçak & Kemal, 2008
13. Ronderosacris Carbonell & Descamps, 1978
14. Stenelutracris Carbonell & Descamps, 1978
15. Tingomariacris Carbonell & Descamps, 1978

subtribe Oulenotacrina Amédégnato, 1977

1. Agrotacris Descamps, 1979
2. Anablysis Gerstaecker, 1889
3. Ananotacris Descamps, 1978
4. Antiphanes (grasshopper) Stål, 1878
5. Barypygiacris Descamps, 1979
6. Demochares (grasshopper) Bolívar, 1906
7. Eurybiacris Descamps, 1979
8. Hysterotettix Descamps, 1979
9. Odontonotacris Descamps, 1978
10. Pseudhypsipages Descamps, 1977

subtribe Vilernina Brunner von Wattenwyl, 1893

- genus group Nicarchae Brunner von Wattenwyl, 1893
1. Acridocryptus Descamps, 1976
2. Aptoceras Bruner, 1908
3. Bryophilacris Descamps, 1976
4. Cryptacris Descamps & Rowell, 1984
5. Hypsipages Gerstaecker, 1889
6. Nicarchus (grasshopper) Stål, 1878
7. Rhabdophilacris Descamps, 1976
8. Sciaphilacris Descamps, 1976
9. Sclerophilacris Descamps, 1976
- other genera
1. Agenacris Amédégnato & Descamps, 1979
2. Caletes (grasshopper) Redtenbacher, 1892
3. Carbonelliella Cadena-Castañeda & Cardona, 2015
4. Leptomerinthoprora Rehn, 1905
5. Leticiacris Amédégnato & Descamps, 1978
6. Locheuma Scudder, 1897
7. Lysacris Descamps & Amédégnato, 1972
8. Machaeropoles Rehn, 1909
9. Pseudovilerna Descamps & Amédégnato, 1989
10. Reyesacris Fontana, Buzzetti & Mariño-Pérez, 2011
11. Sciponacris Descamps, 1978
12. Vilerna Stål, 1873

=== Pauracrini ===
Authority: Amédégnato, 1974

1. Christenacris Descamps & Rowell, 1984
2. Pauracris Descamps & Amédégnato, 1972

=== Pycnosarcini ===
Authority: Liebermann, 1951

1. Apoxycephalacris Amédégnato & Descamps, 1978
2. Pycnosarcus Bolívar, 1906

=== Syntomacrini ===
Authority: Amédégnato, 1974

subtribe Caloscirtina Descamps, 1977

1. Adelacris Descamps & Amédégnato, 1972
2. Anoptotettix Amédégnato & Descamps, 1979
3. Ateliacris Descamps & Rowell, 1978
4. Beoscirtacris Descamps, 1977
5. Calohippus Descamps, 1978
6. Caloscirtus Bruner, 1911
7. Eugenacris Descamps & Amédégnato, 1972
8. Hylescirtacris Descamps, 1978
9. Machigengacris Descamps, 1977
10. Miacris Descamps, 1981
11. Microtylopteryx Rehn, 1905
12. Ociotettix Amédégnato & Descamps, 1979
13. Ortalacris Descamps & Amédégnato, 1972
14. Oteroa Amédégnato & Descamps, 1979
15. Oyampiacris Descamps, 1977
16. Pseudanniceris Descamps, 1977
17. Stigacris Descamps, 1977

subtribe Syntomacrina Amédégnato, 1974

1. Amblyxypha Uvarov, 1925
2. Anniceris (grasshopper) Stål, 1878
3. Deinacris Amédégnato & Descamps, 1979
4. Osmiliola Giglio-Tos, 1897
5. Phaulacris Amédégnato & Descamps, 1979
6. Pollostacris Amédégnato & Descamps, 1979
7. Pseudococama Descamps & Amédégnato, 1971
8. Rhabdoscirtus Bruner, 1911
9. Rhopsotettix Amédégnato & Descamps, 1979
10. Rhyphoscirtus Amédégnato & Descamps, 1979
11. Seabracris Amédégnato & Descamps, 1979
12. Syntomacrella Descamps, 1978
13. Syntomacris Walker, 1870
14. Xiphidiopteron Bruner,

=== Incertae sedis ===
1. Acridurus Perez-Gelabert, Dominici, Hierro & Otte, 1995
2. Beckeracris Amédégnato & Descamps, 1979
3. Guajirus Perez-Gelabert, 2020
4. Hispanacris Perez-Gelabert, Dominici, Hierro & Otte, 1995
5. Hispanotettix Perez-Gelabert, Dominici, Hierro & Otte, 1995
6. Lagidacris Amédégnato & Descamps, 1979
7. Tergoceracris Perez-Gelabert & Otte, 2003
