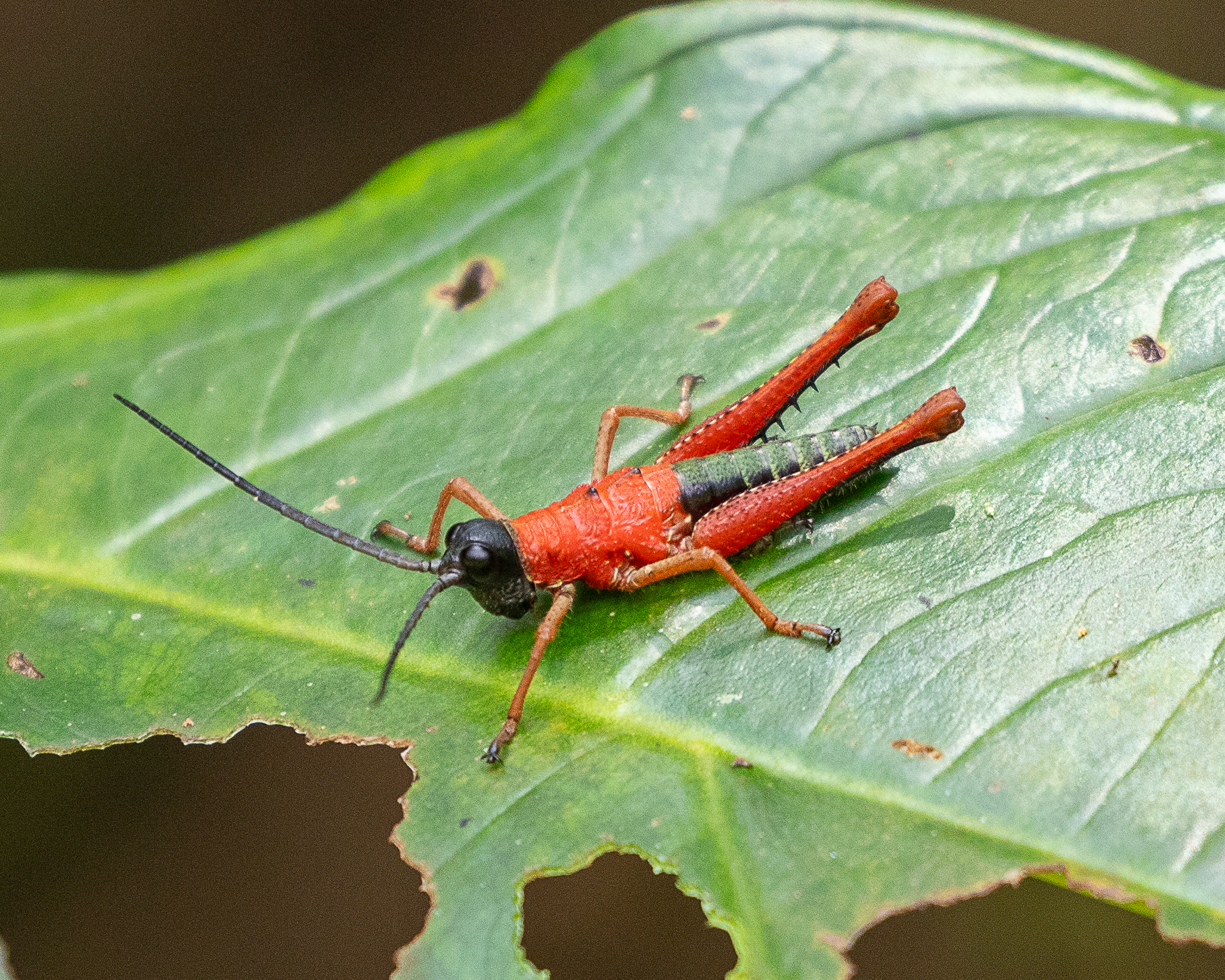
- Male Opaon varicolor, Colombia

Scientific classification
- Kingdom: Animalia
- Phylum: Arthropoda
- Clade: Pancrustacea
- Class: Insecta
- Order: Orthoptera
- Suborder: Caelifera
- Family: Acrididae
- Subfamily: Rhytidochrotinae
- Genus: Opaon
- Species: O. varicolor

Binomial name
- Opaon varicolor (Stål, 1878)

= Opaon varicolor =

Species of short-horned grasshopper

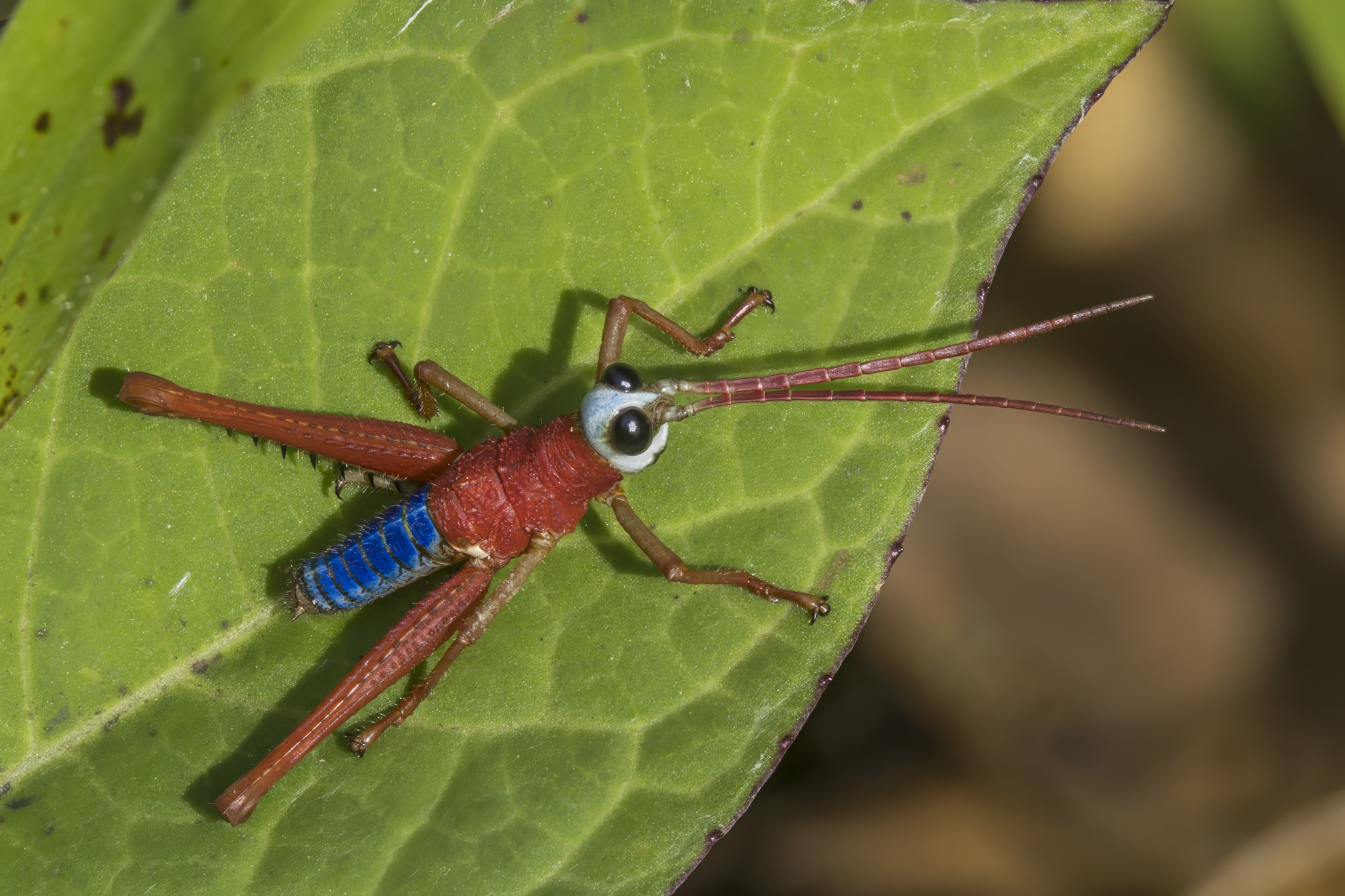
Opaon varicolor, Colombia

Opaon varicolor is a species of short-horned grasshopper in the family Acrididae, and more specifically in the subfamily Rhytidochrotinae.. Its distribution is along the Pacific slope of the Cordillera Occidental within the Chocó Biogeographic region. It appears to be endemic to Colombia.
