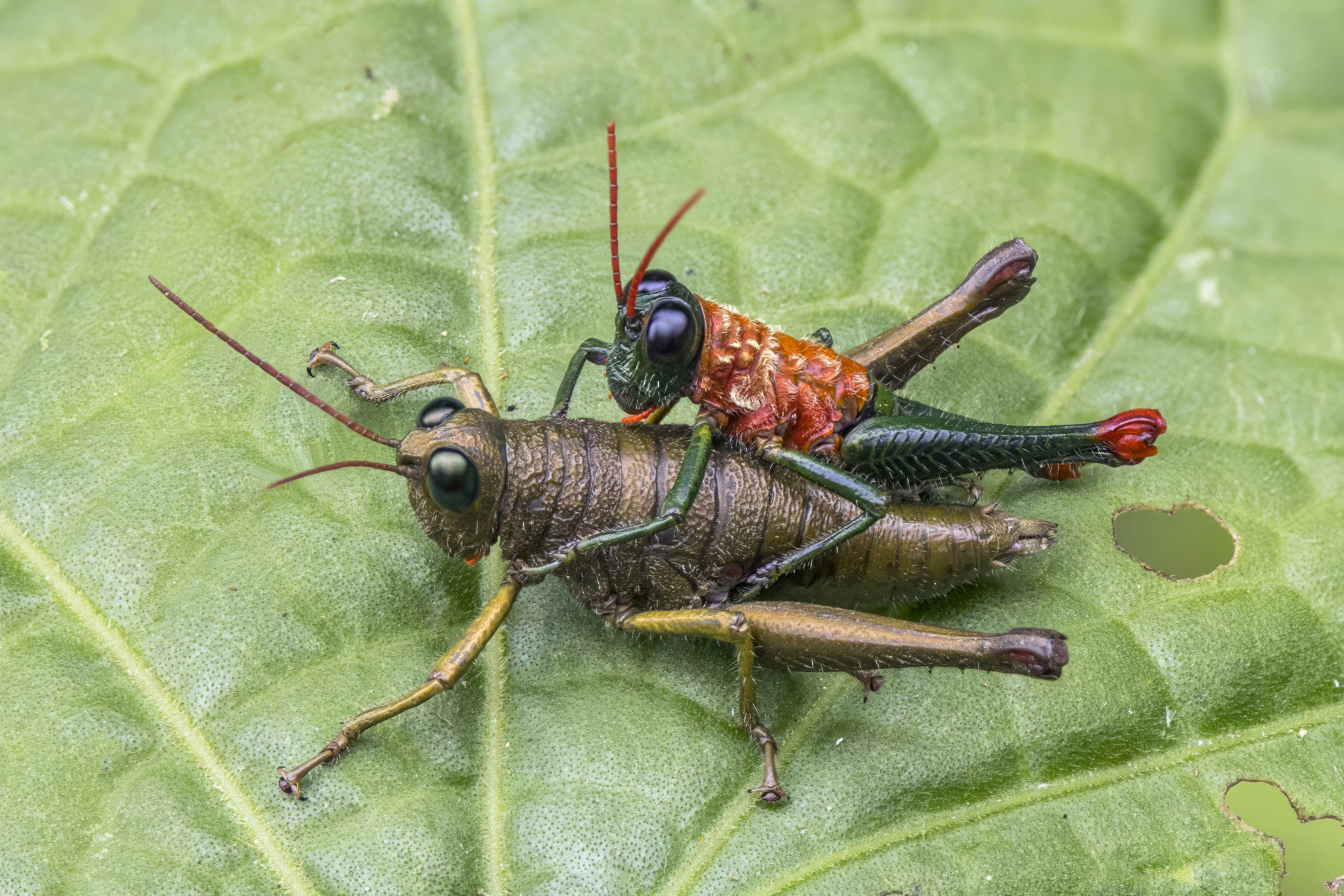
- Rhytidochrota risaraldae, mating, Colombia

Scientific classification
- Kingdom: Animalia
- Phylum: Arthropoda
- Clade: Pancrustacea
- Class: Insecta
- Order: Orthoptera
- Suborder: Caelifera
- Family: Acrididae
- Subfamily: Rhytidochrotinae; Brunner von Wattenwyl, 1893

= Rhytidochrotinae =

Subfamily of grasshoppers

Rhytidochrotinae is a subfamily of grasshoppers from the family Acrididae with 20 genera and 47 species. This group is found from southern Central America to northern South America (Costa Rica to Brazil) with most species distributed in montane forests. The highest concentration of species are found on the Pacific coast and in the West Andes of Colombia with 11 genera and 23 species registered. Many are brightly colored in reds, especially males, and most species are apterous (without wings).

"Rhytido" is derived from the Greek word rhytis, which means "wrinkle".

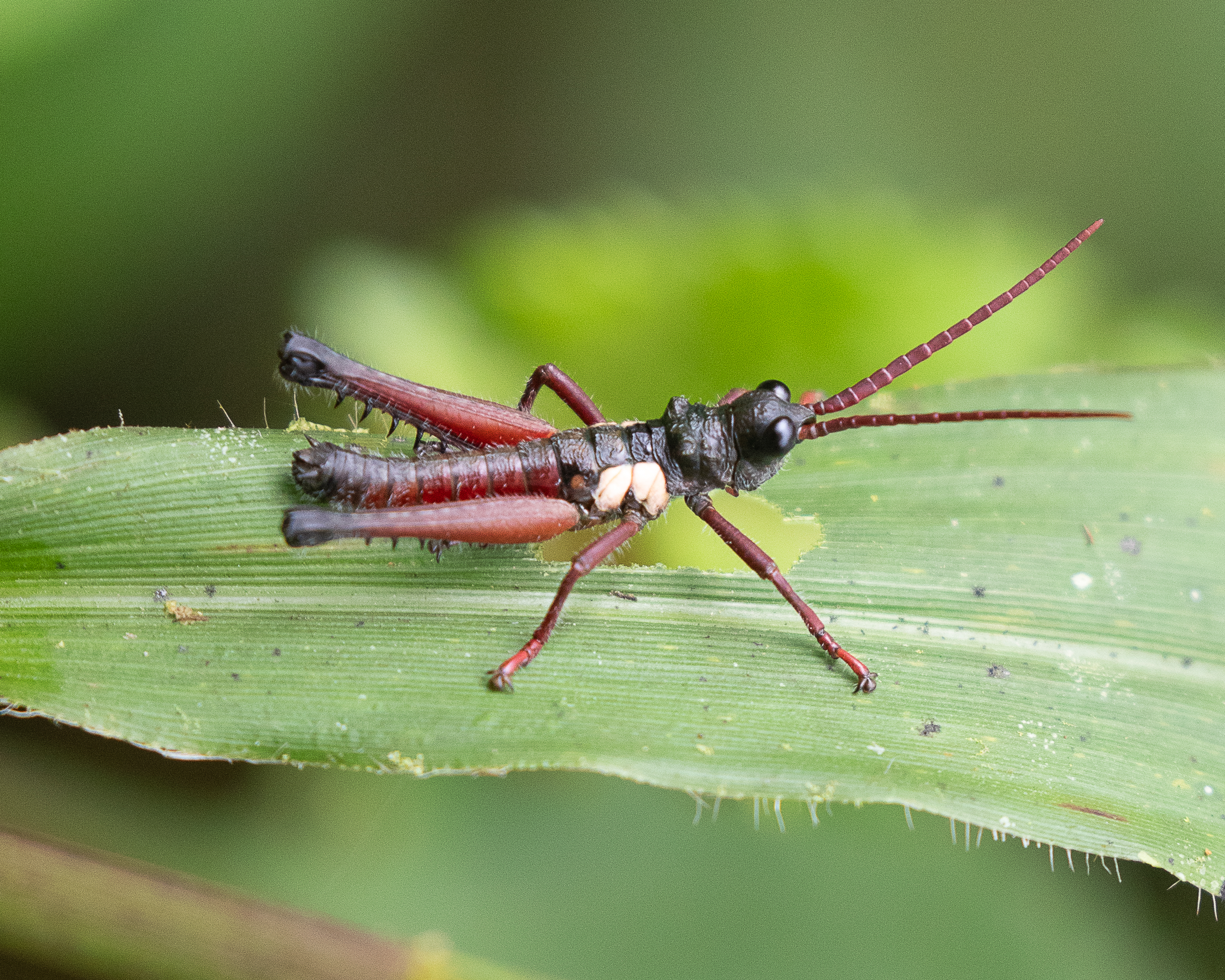
Driphilacris tuberosa - Valle del Cauca, Colombia

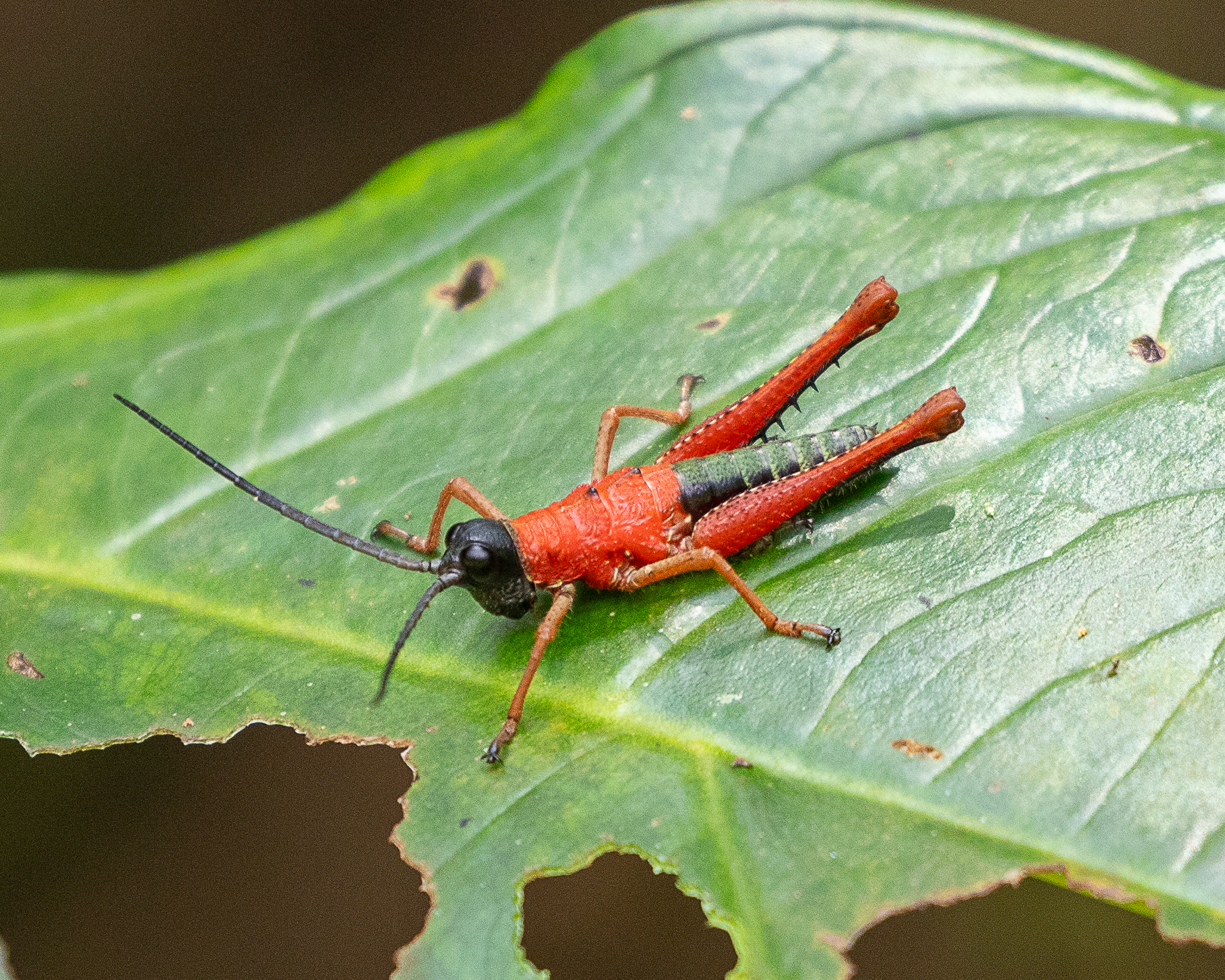
Opaon varicolor - Valle del Cauca, Colombia

== Genera ==
- Brakeracris Rowell, 1995: 1 species; Costa Rica
- Chiriquacris Rowell & Bentos-Pereira, 2005: 1 species; Panama
- Driphilacris Descamps & Amédégnato, 1972: 1 species; Western Colombia
- Exerythracris Rowell, 1995: 1 species; Costa Rica
- Galidacris Descamps & Amédégnato, 1972: 4 species; Colombia
- Hylopedetes Rehn, 1929: 7 species; Costa Rica, Panama and Colombia
- Lathacris Descamps & Amédégnato, 1972: 1 species; Southeastern Brazil
- Liparacris Descamps & Amédégnato, 1972: 1 species; Western Colombia
- Micropaon Descamps & Rowell, 1984: 1 species; Costa Rica
- Muyscacris Hebard, 1923: 1 species; Colombia
- Oedalacris Descamps & Amédégnato, 1972: 5 species; Panama and Colombia
- Opaon Kirby, 1902: 4 species; Colombia and Ecuador
- Opaonella Hebard, 1923: 1 species; Colombia
- Parapiezops Hebard, 1923: 2 species; Colombia
- Paropaon Hebard, 1923: 2 species; Colombia, Ecuador and Peru
- Piezops Hebard, 1923: 1 species; Panama and Colombia
- Rhytidochrota Stål, 1873: 7 species; 6 species in Colombia, 1 species in Bolivia
- Scirtopaon Descamps & Rowell, 1984: 1 species; Costa Rica
- Talamancacris Rowell, 1995: 1 species; Costa Rica
- Trichopaon Descamps & Amédégnato, 1972: 4 species; 3 species in Colombia 1 species in Ecuador
