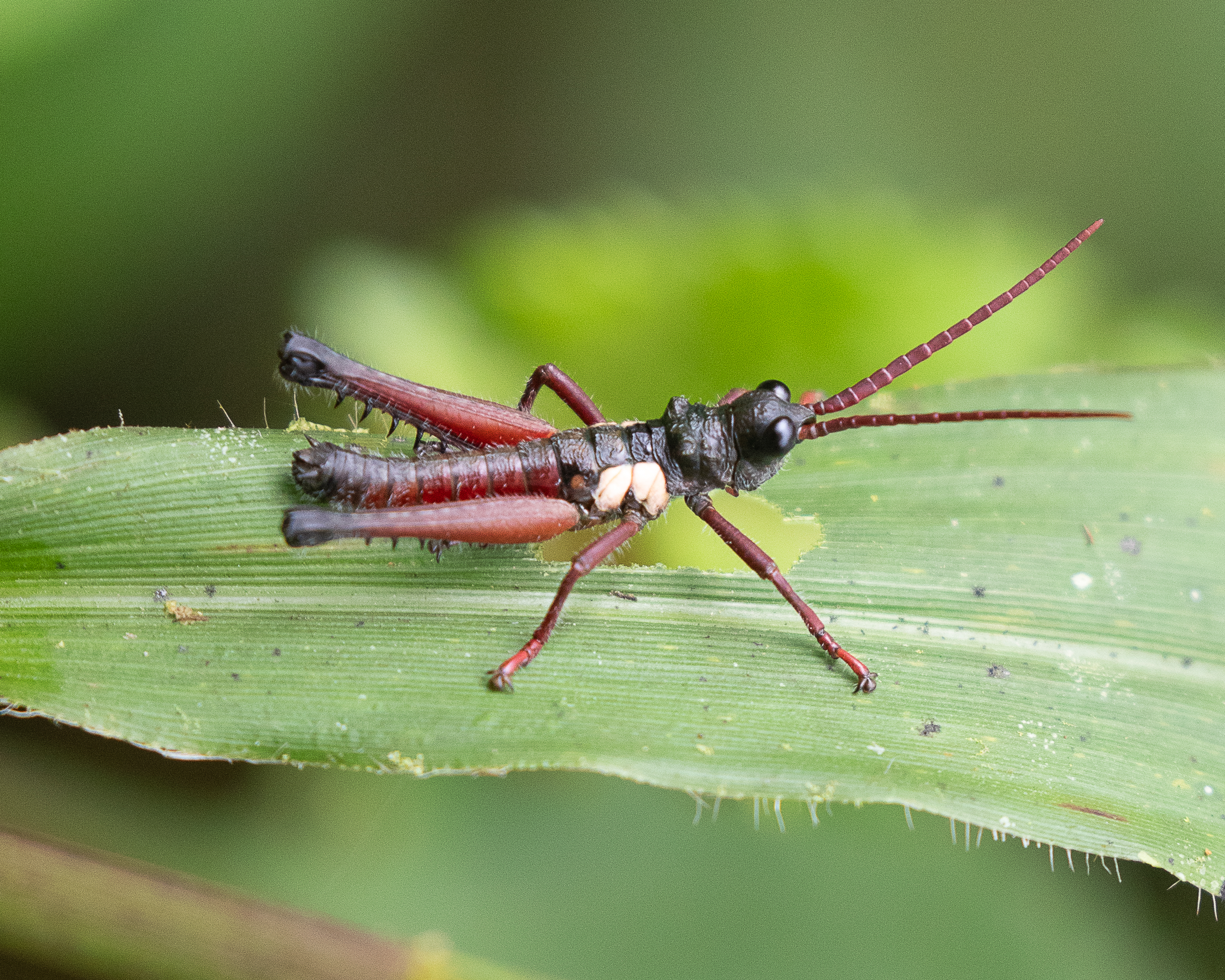
- Male Driphilacris tuberosa Bosque San Antonio, Valle del Cauca

Scientific classification
- Kingdom: Animalia
- Phylum: Arthropoda
- Clade: Pancrustacea
- Class: Insecta
- Order: Orthoptera
- Suborder: Caelifera
- Family: Acrididae
- Subfamily: Rhytidochrotinae
- Genus: Driphilacris; Descamps & Amédégnato, 1972

= Driphilacris =

Genus of grasshoppers

Driphilacris is a genus of the subfamily Rhytidochrotinae. It is a short-horned grasshopper in the Acrididae family.

== Species ==
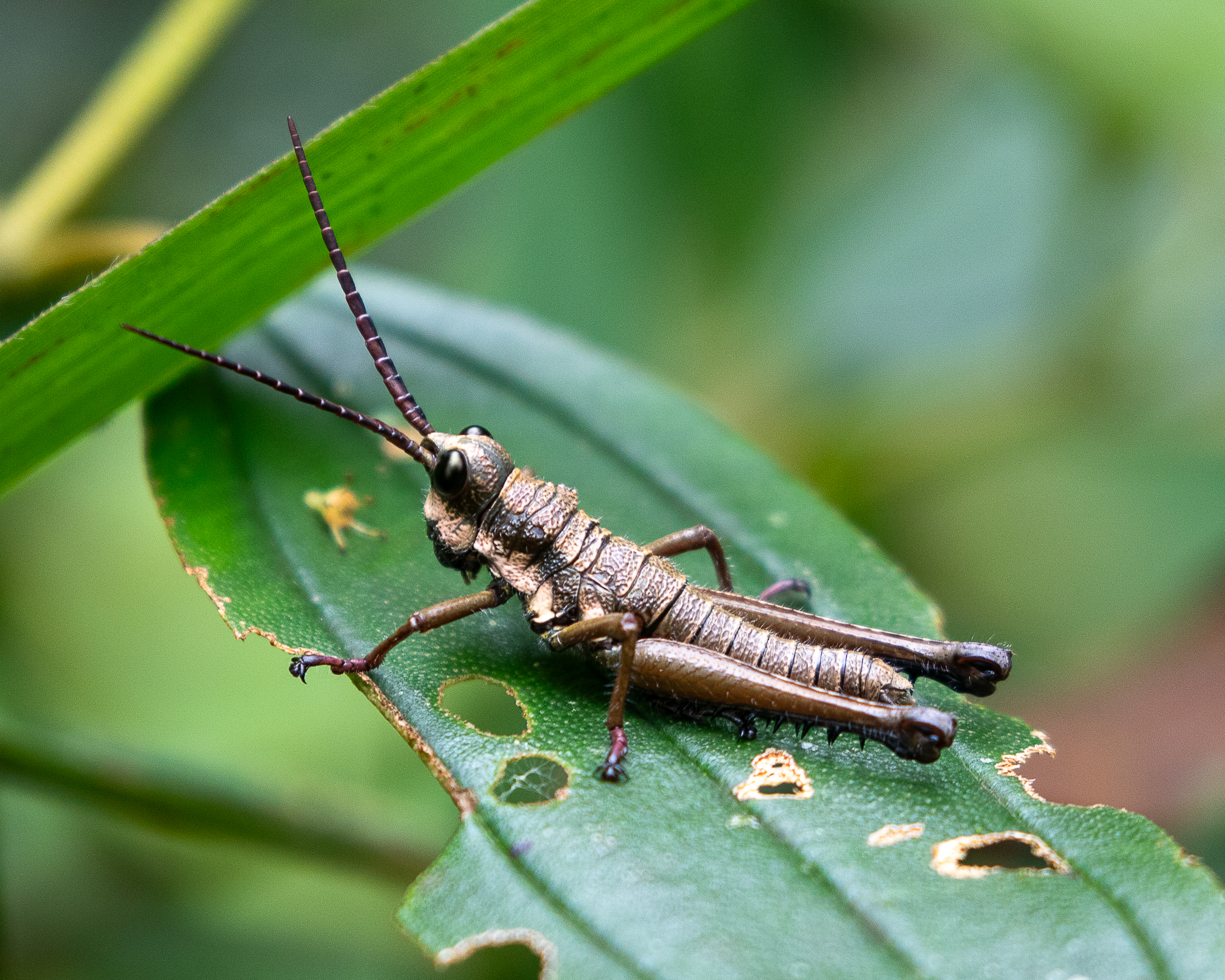
Female Driphilacris tuberosa - Valle del Cauca, Colombia

- Driphilacris tuberosa Descamps & Amédégnato, 1972

This species is endemic to Colombia, only being found in the Cordillera Occidental above the city of Cali in the Valle del Cauca department.
