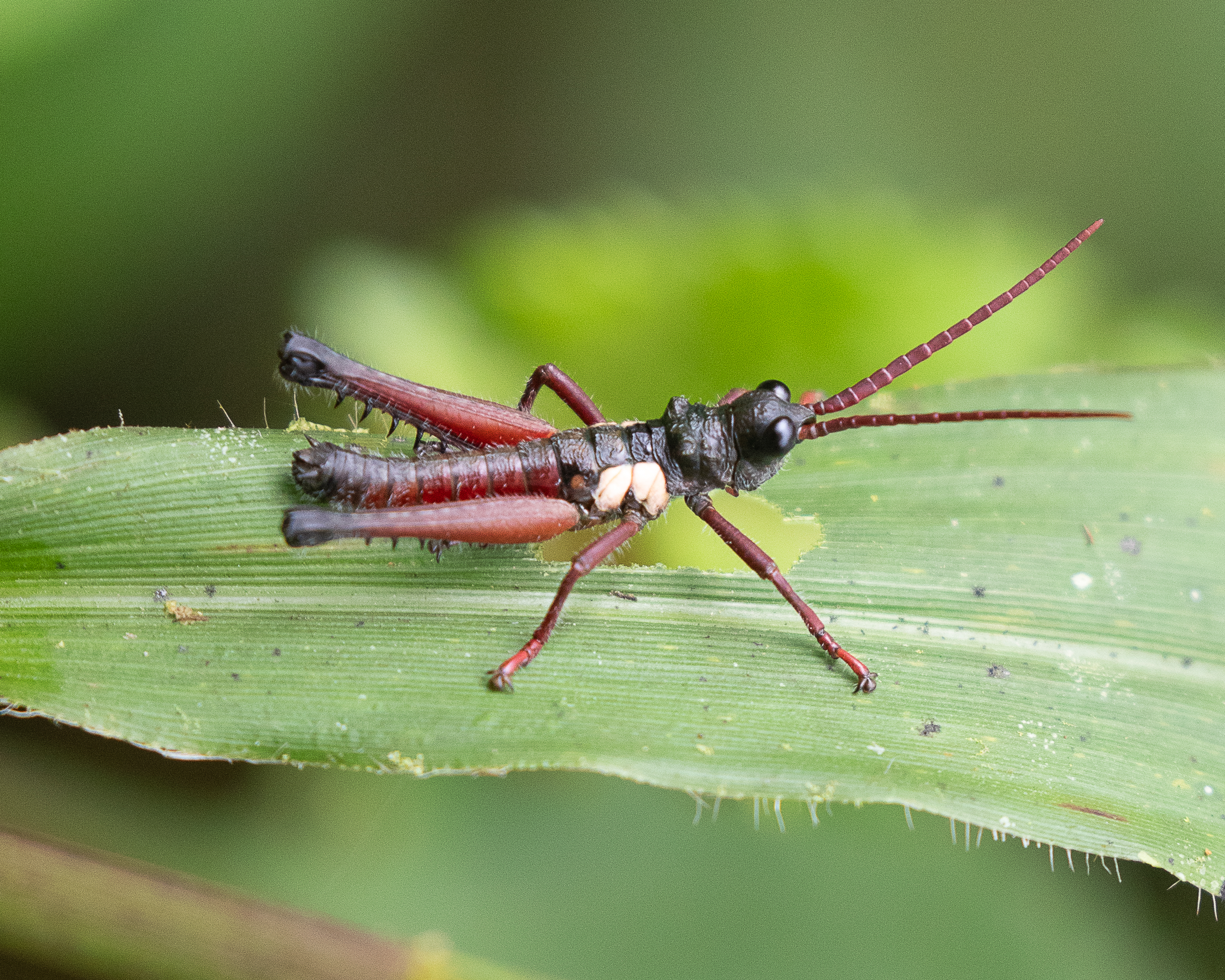
- Driphilacris tuberosa, Valle del Cauca, Colombia

Scientific classification
- Kingdom: Animalia
- Phylum: Arthropoda
- Clade: Pancrustacea
- Class: Insecta
- Order: Orthoptera
- Suborder: Caelifera
- Family: Acrididae
- Genus: Driphilacris
- Species: D. tuberosa

Binomial name
- Driphilacris tuberosa Descamps & Amédégnato, 1973

= Driphilacris tuberosa =

Species of grasshopper

Driphilacris tuberosa is a species of grasshopper found in South America. This species is endemic to Colombia, only being found in the Cordillera Occidental above the city of Cali in the Valle del Cauca department.

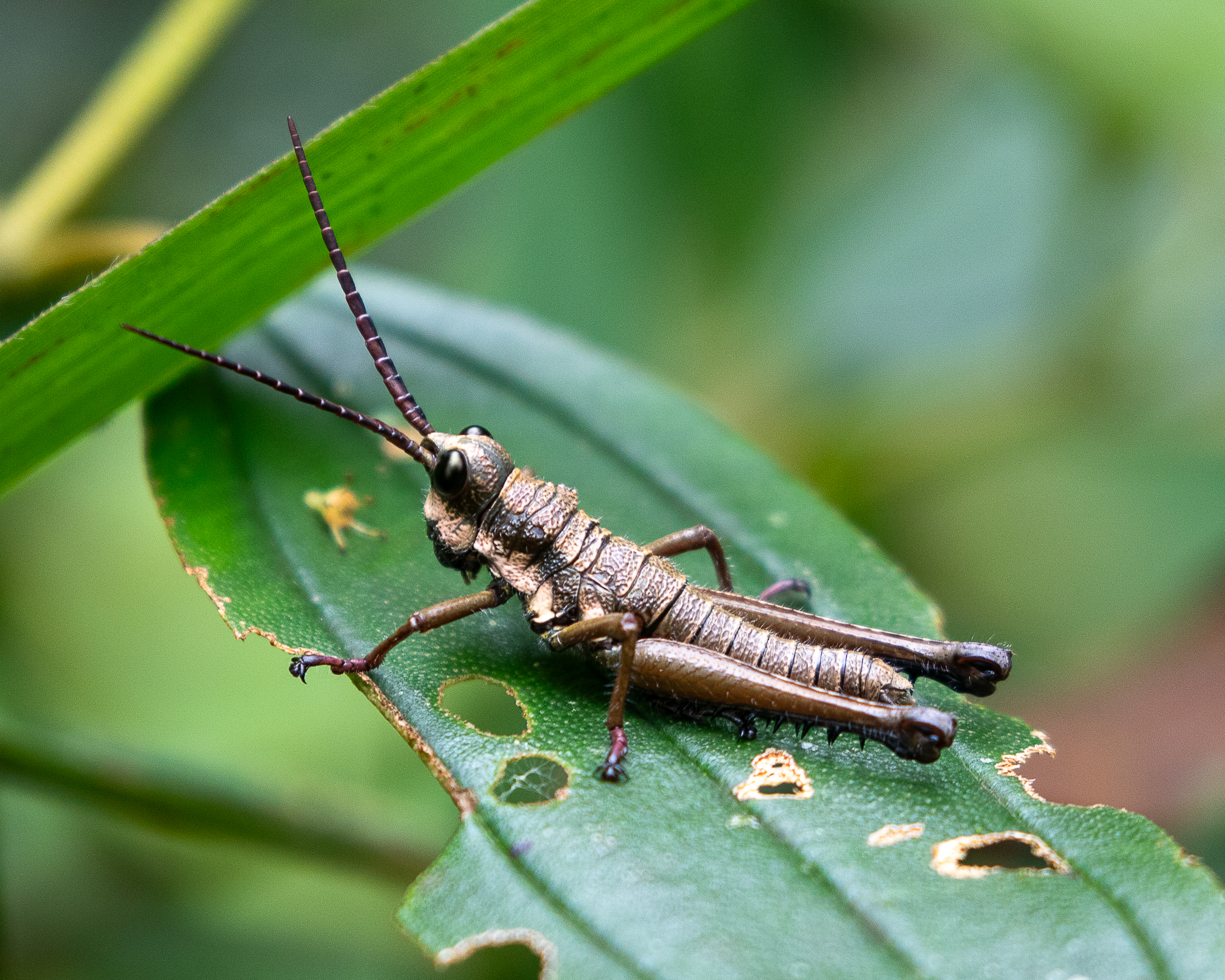
Female Driphilacris tuberosa - Valle del Cauca, Colombia
