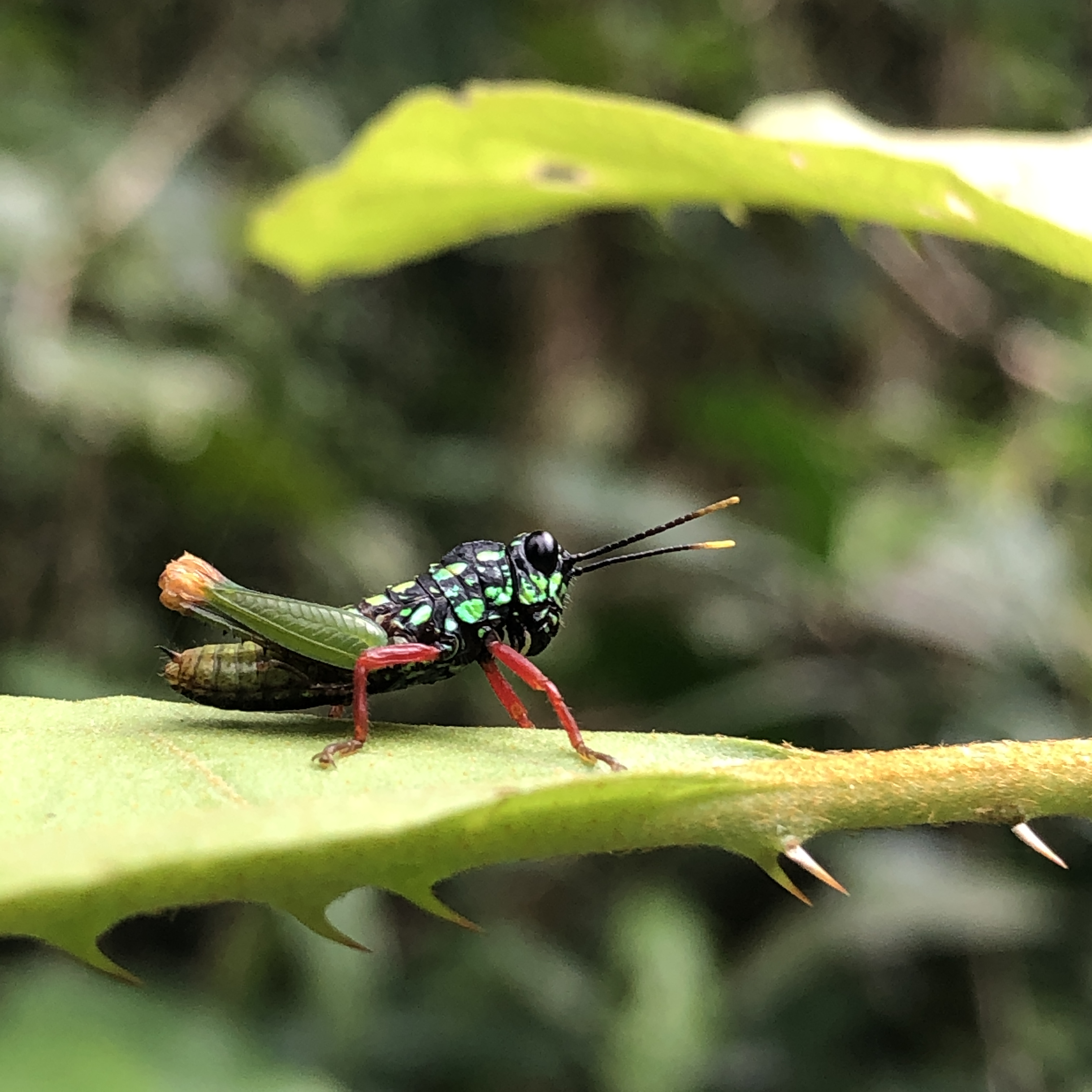
- Galidacris, species unknown - Tiputini Biodiversity Station, Ecuador

Scientific classification
- Kingdom: Animalia
- Phylum: Arthropoda
- Clade: Pancrustacea
- Class: Insecta
- Order: Orthoptera
- Suborder: Caelifera
- Family: Acrididae
- Subfamily: Rhytidochrotinae
- Genus: Galidacris; Descamps & Amédégnato, 1972

= Galidacris =

Genus of cricket-like animals

Galidacris is a genus of grasshoppers belonging to the family Acrididae. They are found in South America within Colombia and Ecuador.

== Behavior ==
The males of the genus have been recorded approaching a female, moving their hind legs (knee-waving) and antennae (twitch-back) silently. The reasoning behind this requires further study. This behavior is a mark of convergent evolution as members in more distantly related grasshoppers share this behavior, while other closer genera do not.

== Species ==
- Galidacris agilis (Descamps & Amédégnato, 1972)
- Galidacris cordillerae (Descamps & Amédégnato, 1972)
- Galidacris eckardtae (Günther, 1940)
- Galidacris variabilis (Descamps & Amédégnato, 1972)
