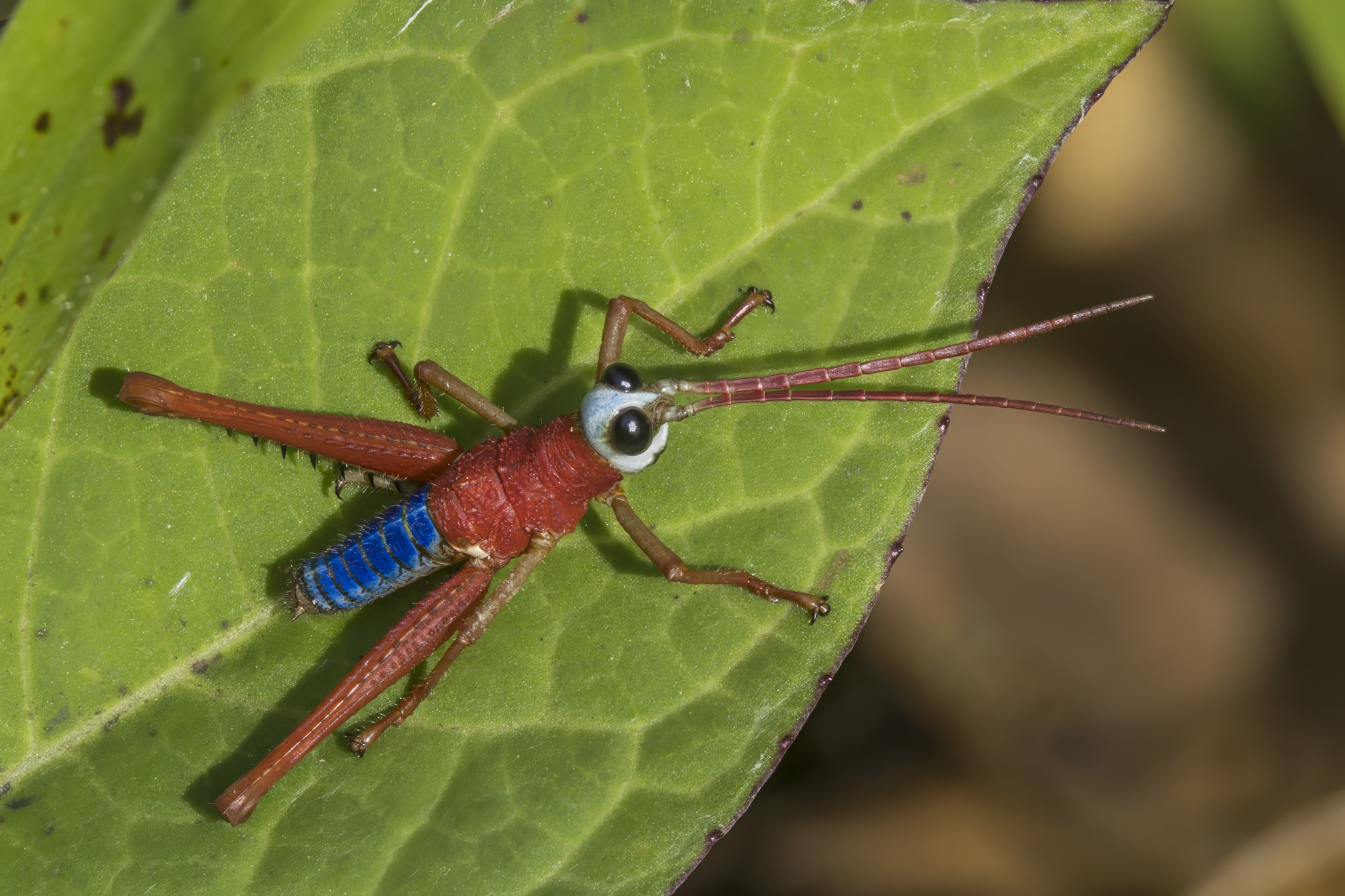
- Opaon varicolor, Colombia

Scientific classification
- Kingdom: Animalia
- Phylum: Arthropoda
- Clade: Pancrustacea
- Class: Insecta
- Order: Orthoptera
- Suborder: Caelifera
- Family: Acrididae
- Subfamily: Rhytidochrotinae
- Genus: Opaon; Kirby, 1902

= Opaon =

Genus of grasshoppers

Opaon is a genus of short-horned grasshoppers in the family Acrididae. There are at least four described species in Opaon, found in South America.

== Species ==
These species belong to the genus Opaon:

- Opaon eckhardtae Günther, 1940
- Opaon filicornis Descamps, 1973
- Opaon granulosus Kirby, 1902
- Opaon varicolor (Stål, 1878)
