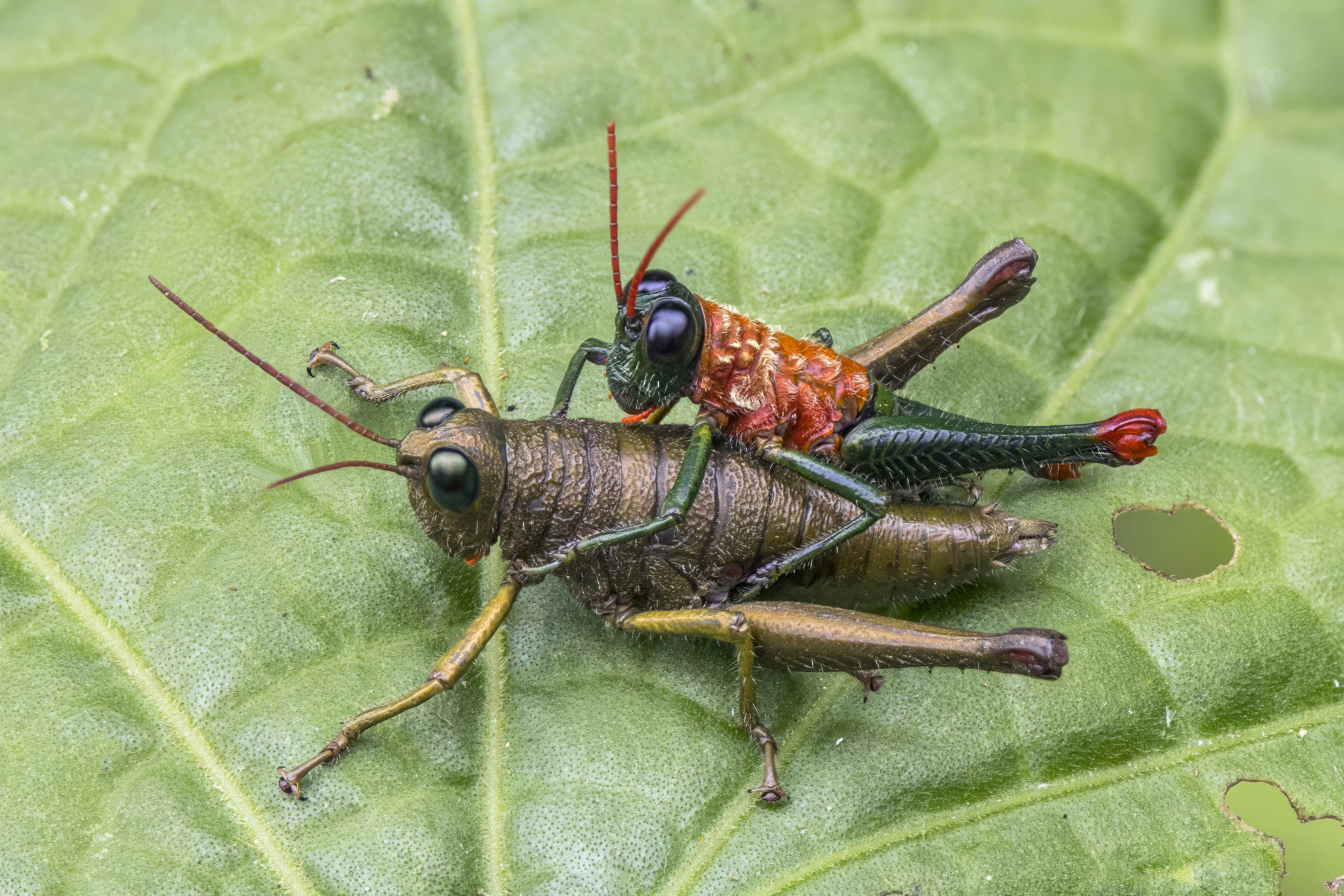
- Rhytidochrota risaraldae, mating, Colombia

Scientific classification
- Kingdom: Animalia
- Phylum: Arthropoda
- Clade: Pancrustacea
- Class: Insecta
- Order: Orthoptera
- Suborder: Caelifera
- Family: Acrididae
- Genus: Rhytidochrota
- Species: R. risaraldae

Binomial name
- Rhytidochrota risaraldae Descamps & Amédégnato, 1973

= Rhytidochrota risaraldae =

Species of grasshopper

Rhytidochrota risaraldae is a species of short-horned grasshopper known from Colombia. It was described in 1974 from collections made near Santa Rosa de Cabal, Risaralda.
