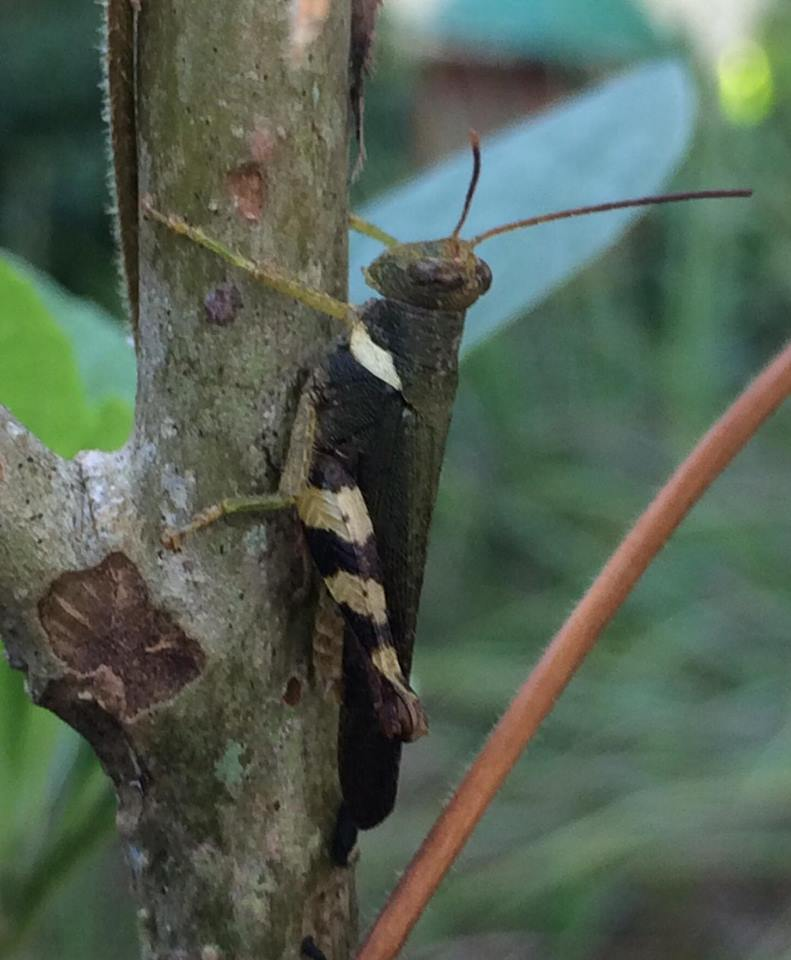
- Apalacris varicornis, Vietnam
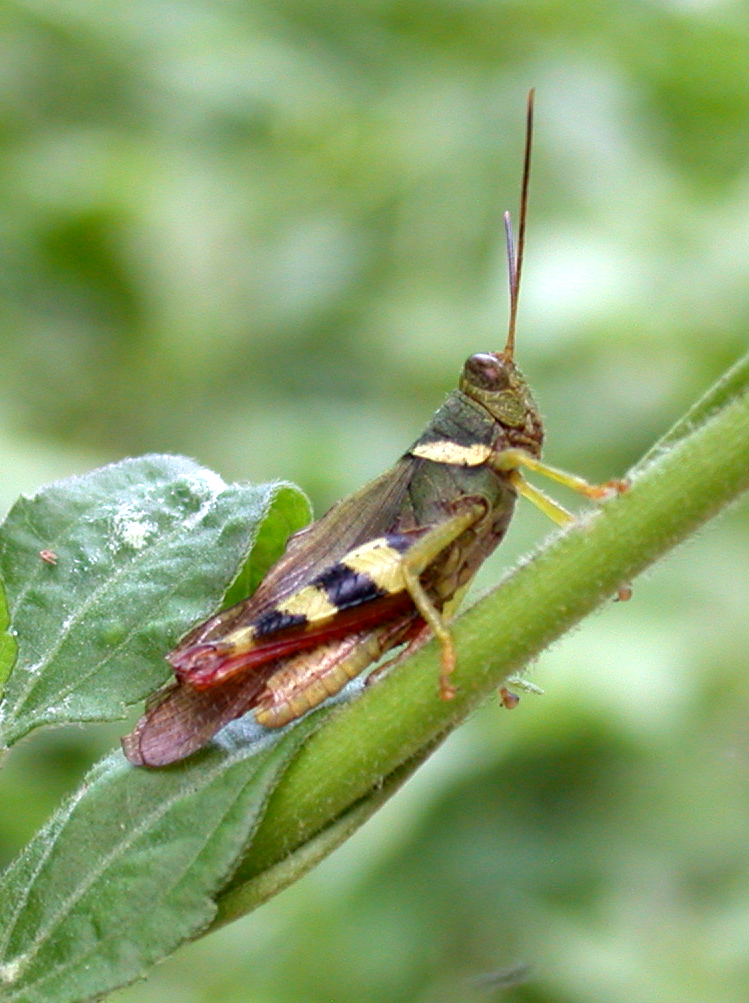
- A. varicornis male

Scientific classification
- Kingdom: Animalia
- Phylum: Arthropoda
- Class: Insecta
- Order: Orthoptera
- Suborder: Caelifera
- Family: Acrididae
- Subfamily: Coptacrinae
- Genus: Apalacris
- Species: A. varicornis

Binomial name
- Apalacris varicornis Walker, 1870

= Apalacris varicornis =

Species of grasshopper

Apalacris varicornis is a species of grasshopper in the family Acrididae. It is found in Indomalaya and has been recorded as a minor agricultural pest in Thailand and Malaysia.
