= Rhopaloceracris =

Scientific classification
- Domain: Eukaryota
- Kingdom: Animalia
- Phylum: Arthropoda
- Class: Insecta
- Order: Orthoptera
- Suborder: Caelifera
- Family: Acrididae
- Subfamily: Coptacrinae
- Genus: Rhopaloceracris; Tinkham, 1940

Type species
- Rhopaloceracris chapaensis Tinkham, 1940

Genus of grasshoppers

Rhopaloceracris is a genus of Asian grasshoppers in the family Acrididae, subfamily Coptacrinae.

== Species ==
The Orthoptera Species File lists:

1. Rhopaloceracris chapaensis Tinkham, 1940 - type species from "Mount Chapa", northern Vietnam
2. Rhopaloceracris chinensis Tinkham, 1940 - south-east China
