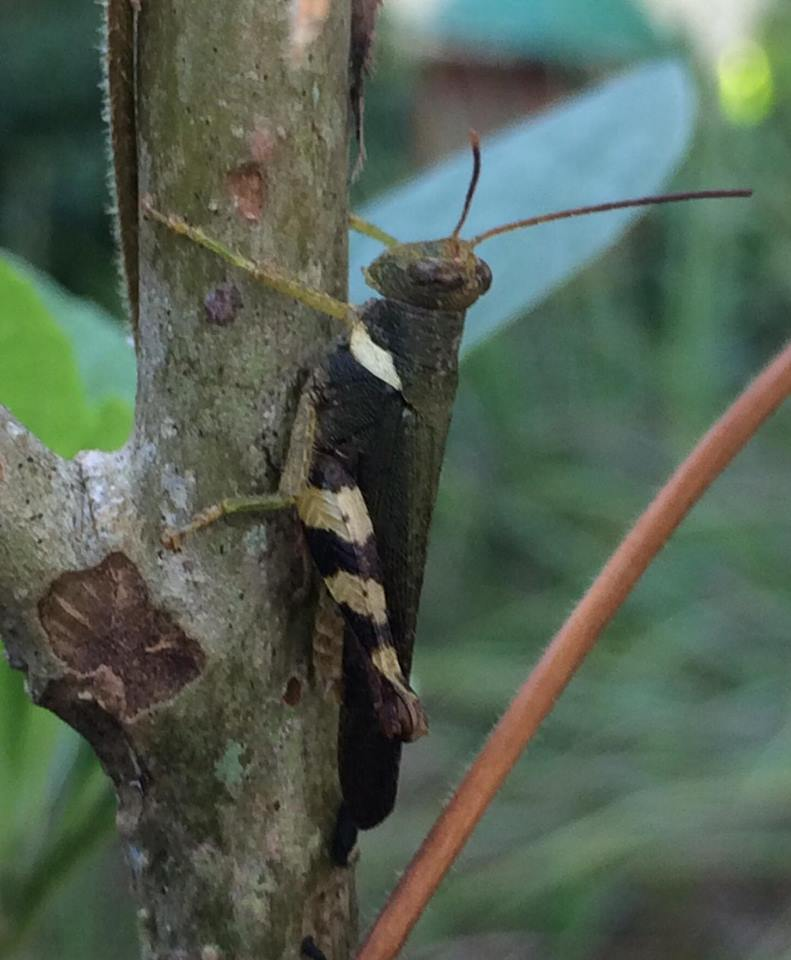
- Apalacris varicornis at Cát Tiên National Park

Scientific classification
- Kingdom: Animalia
- Phylum: Arthropoda
- Class: Insecta
- Order: Orthoptera
- Suborder: Caelifera
- Family: Acrididae
- Subfamily: Coptacrinae
- Genus: Apalacris; Walker, 1870

= Apalacris =

Genus of grasshoppers

Apalacris is a genus of grasshoppers in the family Acrididae and subfamily Coptacrinae. The recorded distribution of species includes: India, Indo-China and Malesia.

== Species ==
The Catalogue of Life lists:

- Apalacris annulipes Bolívar, 1890
- Apalacris antennata Liang, 1988
- Apalacris celebensis Willemse, 1936
- Apalacris cingulatipes Bolívar, 1898
- Apalacris contracta Walker, 1870
- Apalacris cyanoptera Stål, 1877
- Apalacris dupanglingensis Zheng & Fu, 2005
- Apalacris eminifronta Niu & Zheng, 2016
- Apalacris gracilis Willemse, 1936
- Apalacris incompleta Willemse, 1936
- Apalacris maculifemura (Lin & Zheng, 2014)
- Apalacris monticola Miller, 1932
- Apalacris nigrogeniculata Bi, 1984
- Apalacris pendleburyi Miller, 1932
- Apalacris splendens Willemse, 1930
- Apalacris tonkinensis Ramme, 1941
- Apalacris varicornis Walker, 1870 - type species (India, Indo-China)
- Apalacris viridis Huang & Xia, 1985
- Apalacris xizangensis Bi, 1984
