= Cyphocerastis elegans =

Scientific classification
- Domain: Eukaryota
- Kingdom: Animalia
- Phylum: Arthropoda
- Class: Insecta
- Order: Orthoptera
- Suborder: Caelifera
- Family: Acrididae
- Genus: Cyphocerastis
- Species: C. elegans

Binomial name
- Cyphocerastis elegans Ramme, 1929

Species of grasshopper

Cyphocerastis elegans is a species of grasshoppers in the family Acrididae found in Africa.
