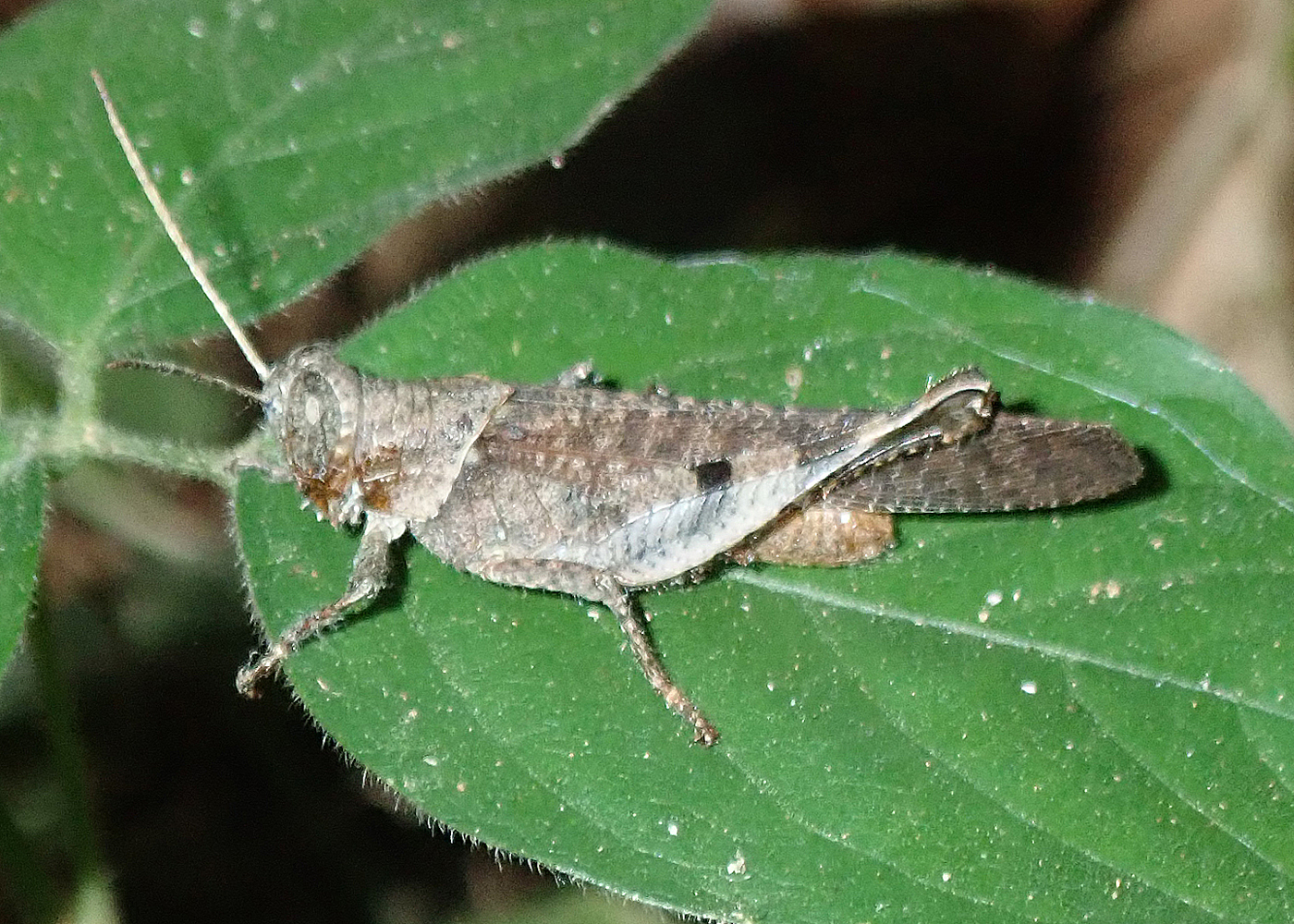
- Epistaurus cf aberrans, Cat Tien National Park

Scientific classification
- Kingdom: Animalia
- Phylum: Arthropoda
- Class: Insecta
- Order: Orthoptera
- Suborder: Caelifera
- Family: Acrididae
- Subfamily: Coptacrinae
- Genus: Epistaurus; Bolívar, 1889

Type species
- Epistaurus crucigerus Bolívar, 1889

= Epistaurus =

Genus of grasshoppers

Epistaurus is a genus of grasshoppers in the family Acrididae, subfamily Coptacrinae.

Species can be found in West and Central Africa, the Indian subcontinent, Indo-China and southern China.

== Species ==
The Orthoptera Species File lists:

- Epistaurus aberrans Brunner von Wattenwyl, 1893
- Epistaurus bolivari Karny, 1907
- Epistaurus crucigerus Bolívar, 1889
- Epistaurus diopi Mestre, 2001
- Epistaurus meridionalis Bi, 1984
- Epistaurus sinetyi Bolívar, 1902
- Epistaurus succineus Krauss, 1877
