= Uluguru mountain grasshopper =

Conservation status
- Critically Endangered (IUCN 3.1)

Scientific classification
- Domain: Eukaryota
- Kingdom: Animalia
- Phylum: Arthropoda
- Class: Insecta
- Order: Orthoptera
- Suborder: Caelifera
- Family: Acrididae
- Genus: Cyphocerastis
- Species: C. uluguruensis

Binomial name
- Cyphocerastis uluguruensis (Johnsen, 1987)

Species of grasshopper

The Uluguru mountain grasshopper (Cyphocerastis uluguruensis) is a rare species of grasshopper in the family Acrididae. The species is endemic to Uluguru Mountains of Tanzania, and is critically endangered due to a decline of its habitat.
