= Coptacra =

Scientific classification
- Domain: Eukaryota
- Kingdom: Animalia
- Phylum: Arthropoda
- Class: Insecta
- Order: Orthoptera
- Suborder: Caelifera
- Family: Acrididae
- Subfamily: Coptacrinae
- Genus: Coptacra; Stål, 1873

Synonyms
- Bibractoides Kirby, 1914; Coptacris Li & Liu, 1995; Syletria Rehn, 1905

Genus of grasshoppers

Coptacra is the type genus of grasshoppers in the subfamily Coptacrinae (family Acrididae). Species can be found in tropical Asia.

== Species ==
The Catalogue of Life lists:

- Coptacra angulata Rehn, 1905
- Coptacra ensifera Bolívar, 1902
- Coptacra foedata (Serville, 1838) - type species (as Acridium foedatum Serville)
- Coptacra formosana Tinkham, 1940
- Coptacra hainanensis Tinkham, 1940
- Coptacra lafoashana Tinkham, 1940
- Coptacra longicornis Balderson & Yin, 1987
- Coptacra minuta Bey-Bienko, 1968
- Coptacra nigrifemura Wei & Zheng, 2005
- Coptacra punctoria Walker, 1870
- Coptacra taiwanensis Zhang & Yin, 2002
- Coptacra tonkinensis Willemse, 1939
- Coptacra tuberculata Ramme, 1941
- Coptacra xiai Yin, Ye & Yin, 2011
- Coptacra yunnanensis Zhang & Yin, 2002
