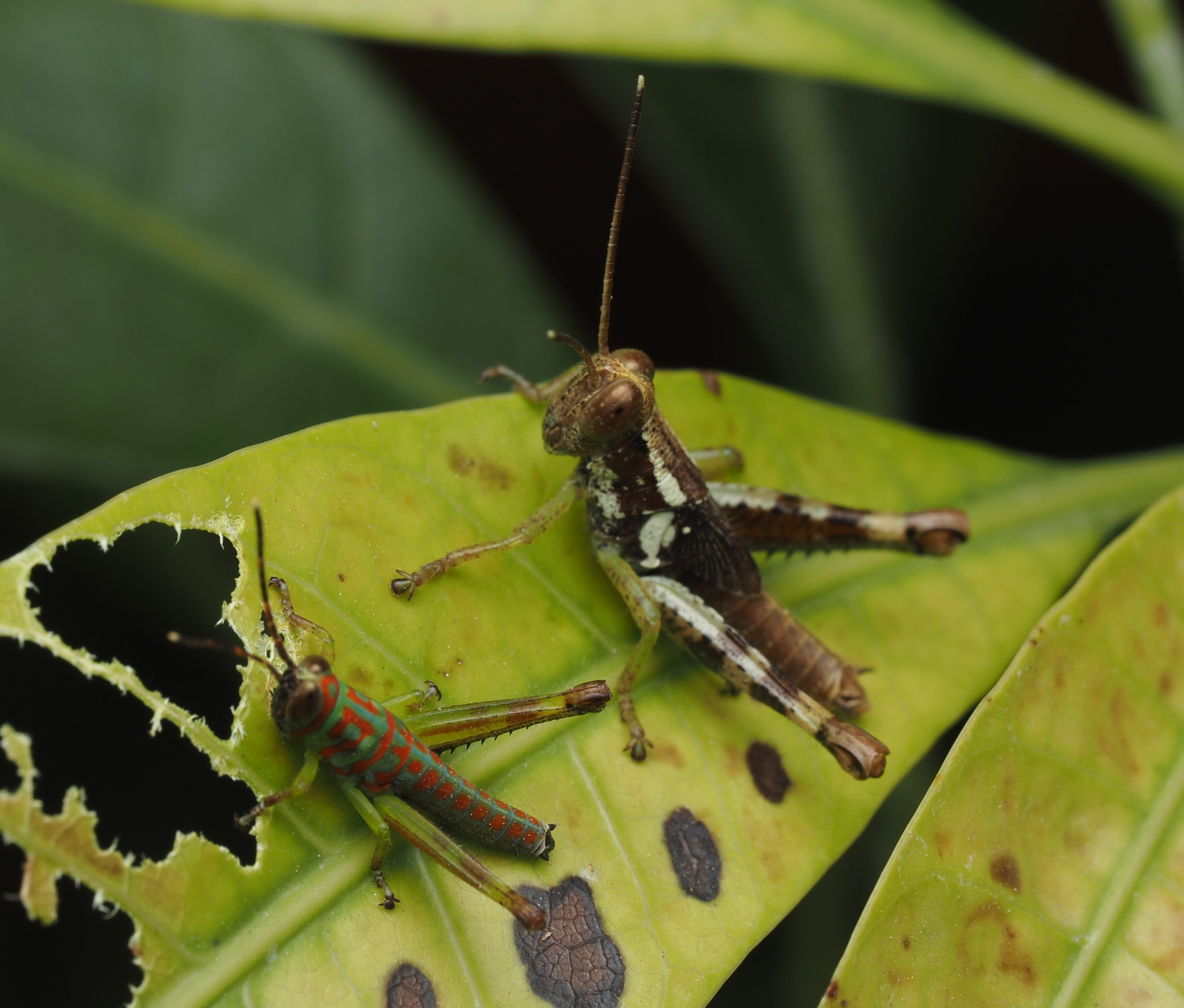
- Nymphs of two instars, in Bangalore, India

Scientific classification
- Kingdom: Animalia
- Phylum: Arthropoda
- Clade: Pancrustacea
- Class: Insecta
- Order: Orthoptera
- Suborder: Caelifera
- Family: Acrididae
- Subfamily: Coptacrinae
- Genus: Pirithoicus; Uvarov, 1940
- Species: P. ophthalmicus

Binomial name
- Pirithoicus ophthalmicus (Karny, 1907)

Synonyms
- Catantopides ophthalmicus (Karny, 1907); Catantops ophthalmicus Karny, 1907; Pirithoicus opthalmicus; Pirithous ramachendrai Bolívar, 1917

= Pirithoicus =

Species of grasshopper

Pirithoicus ophthalmicus, the little clown grasshopper, is a species of grasshopper in the family Romaleidae native to southern India. It is the only species in the genus Pirithoicus, as another taxa, Pirithous ramachendrai, was synonymized to this one.
