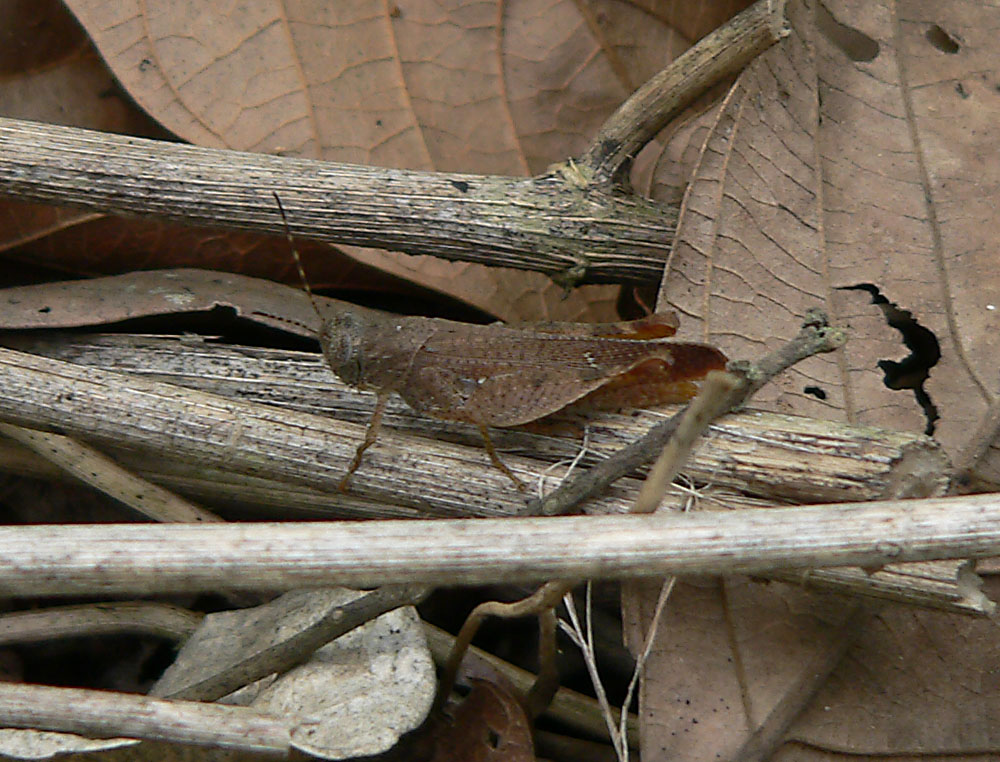

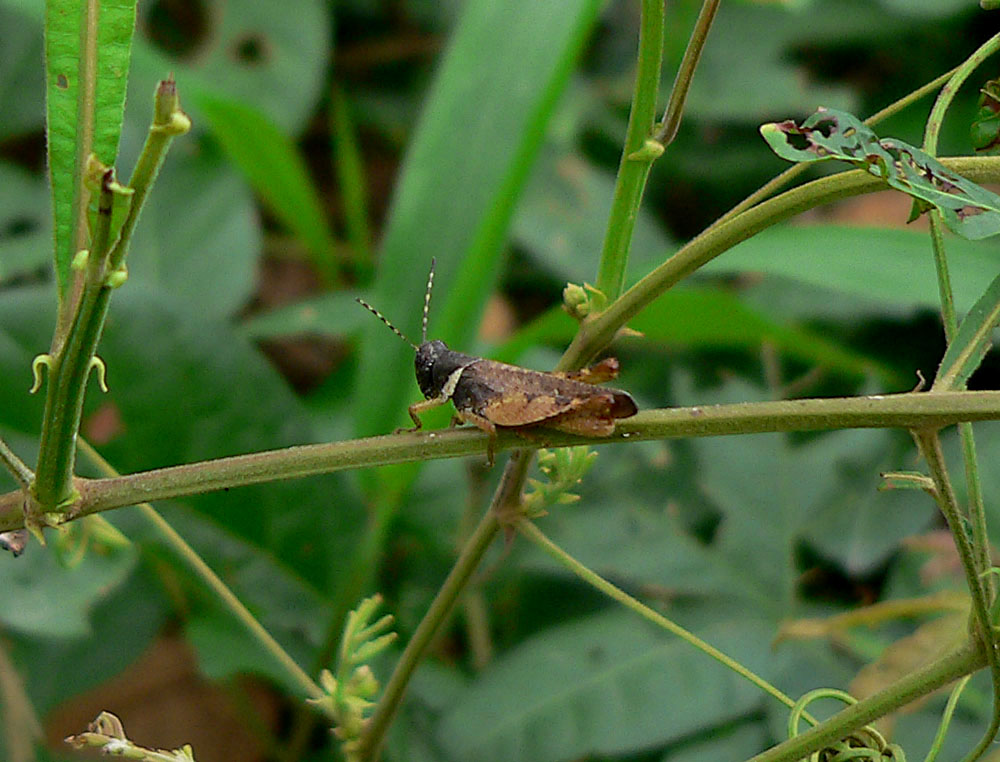
- Eucoptacra anguliflava: female & male

Scientific classification
- Domain: Eukaryota
- Kingdom: Animalia
- Phylum: Arthropoda
- Class: Insecta
- Order: Orthoptera
- Suborder: Caelifera
- Family: Acrididae
- Subfamily: Coptacrinae
- Genus: Eucoptacra; Bolívar, 1902

= Eucoptacra =

Genus of grasshoppers

Eucoptacra is a genus of grasshoppers in the family Acrididae and subfamily Coptacrinae. Species can be found in: Africa, India, Indo-China, peninsular Malaysia and Borneo.

== Species ==
The Catalogue of Life lists:

- Eucoptacra abbreviata Ingrisch, Willemse & Shishodia, 2004
- Eucoptacra anguliflava Karsch, 1893
- Eucoptacra basidens Chapman, 1960
- Eucoptacra bicornis Baccetti, 2004
- Eucoptacra bidens Uvarov, 1953
- Eucoptacra binghami Uvarov, 1921
- Eucoptacra borneensis Willemse, 1962
- Eucoptacra brevidens Uvarov, 1953
- Eucoptacra ceylonica Kirby, 1914
- Eucoptacra exigua Bolívar, 1912
- Eucoptacra gowdeyi Uvarov, 1923
- Eucoptacra granulata Mason, 1979
- Eucoptacra inamoena Walker, 1871
- Eucoptacra incompta Walker, 1871
- Eucoptacra kwangtungensis Tinkham, 1940
- Eucoptacra minima Ramme, 1941
- Eucoptacra motuoensis Yin, 1984
- Eucoptacra nana Uvarov, 1953
- Eucoptacra paupercula Kirby, 1902
- Eucoptacra poecila Uvarov, 1939
- Eucoptacra praemorsa Stål, 1861 - type species (as Acridium praemorsum Stål)
- Eucoptacra sheffieldi Bolívar, 1912
- Eucoptacra signata Bolívar, 1889
- Eucoptacra similis Uvarov, 1953
- Eucoptacra spathulacauda Jago, 1966
- Eucoptacra torquata Bolívar, 1912
- Eucoptacra turneri Miller, 1932
