= Cyphocerastis =

Scientific classification
- Domain: Eukaryota
- Kingdom: Animalia
- Phylum: Arthropoda
- Class: Insecta
- Order: Orthoptera
- Suborder: Caelifera
- Family: Acrididae
- Subfamily: Coptacrinae
- Genus: Cyphocerastis; Karsch 1891

Species
- Cyphocerastis clavareaui Bolivar, I., 1908; Cyphocerastis elegans Ramme, 1929; Cyphocerastis falcifera (Rehn, 1914); Cyphocerastis hopei Bruner, 1920; Cyphocerastis laeta Karsch, F., 1891; Cyphocerastis pulcherrima Ramme, 1929; Cyphocerastis scheunemanni Ramme, 1929; Cyphocerastis stipatus (Walker, F., 1870); Cyphocerastis tristis Karsch, F., 1891; Cyphocerastis uluguruensis Johnsen, 1987

Genus of grasshoppers

Cyphocerastis is a genus of grasshoppers in the family Acrididae.
