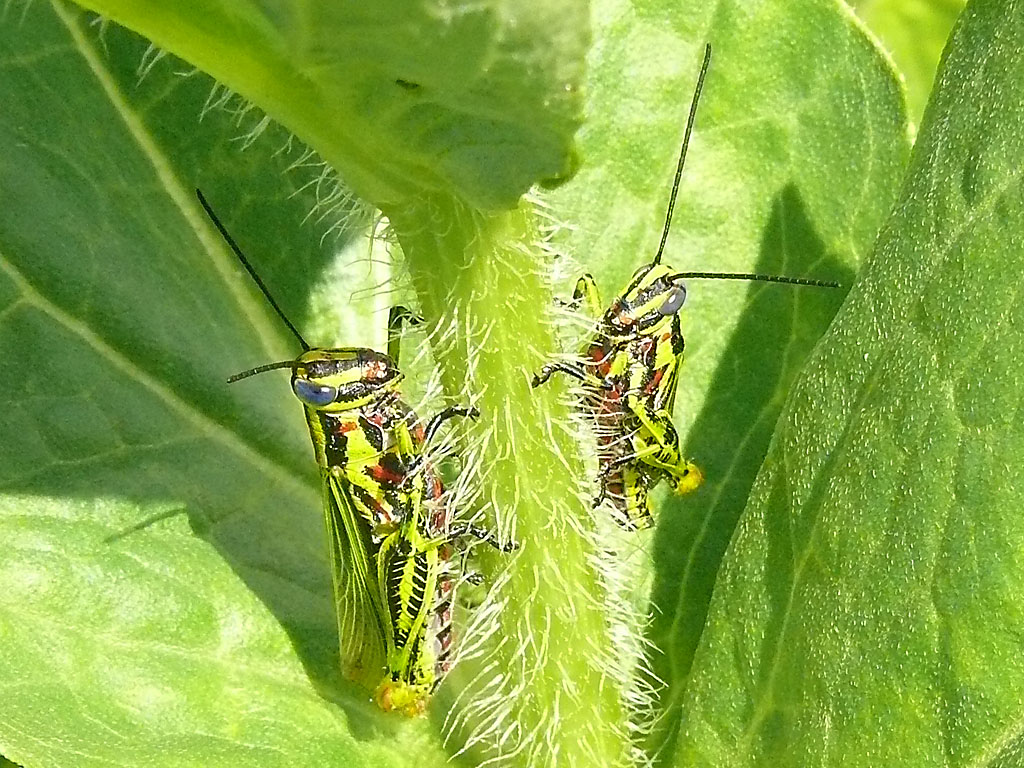
- Poecilocerastis sp (female on left)
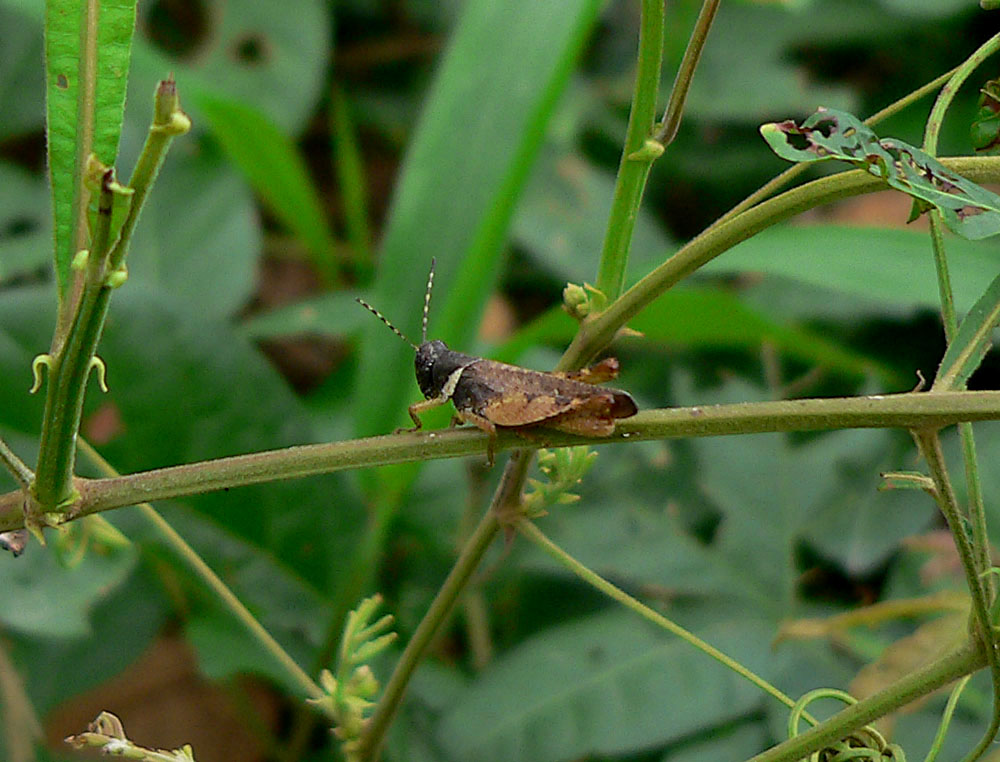
- Eucoptacra anguliflava male

Scientific classification
- Kingdom: Animalia
- Phylum: Arthropoda
- Clade: Pancrustacea
- Class: Insecta
- Order: Orthoptera
- Suborder: Caelifera
- Infraorder: Acrididea
- Nanorder: Acridomorpha
- Superfamily: Acridoidea
- Family: Acrididae
- Subfamily: Coptacrinae; Brunner von Wattenwyl, 1893

Synonyms
- Coptacrae Brunner von Wattenwyl, 1893; Coptacridinae Brunner von Wattenwyl, 1893; Coptacrini Brunner von Wattenwyl, 1893

= Coptacrinae =

Subfamily of grasshoppers

The Coptacrinae are a subfamily of Acrididae (originally described by Brunner von Wattenwyl under the synonym: Coptacrae) in the Orthoptera: Caelifera. Species can be found in Africa and Asia.

== Genera ==
The Orthoptera Species File lists the following:

- Apalacris Walker, 1870
- Bocagella Bolívar, 1889 - Africa
- Coptacra Stål, 1873 (type genus) - tropical Asia
- Coptacrella Bolívar, 1902 - India
- Coptacridia Ramme, 1941 - Eastern Himalayas
- Cyphocerastis Karsch, 1891 - equatorial Africa
- Ecphanthacris: E. mirabilis Tinkham, 1940 - eastern China
- Ecphymacris Bi, 1984: E. lofaoshana (Tinkham, 1940) - eastern China
- Epistaurus Bolívar, 1889 - Africa, India, Indo-China
- Eucoptacra Bolívar, 1902 - Africa, India, Indo-China, peninsular Malaysia, Borneo
- Eustaurus: E. tibialus Mahmood & Yousuf, 2000 - Pakistan
- Exochoderes Bolívar, 1882 - Angola
- Hintzia: H. squamiptera Ramme, 1929 - Cameroon
- Pamphagella Bruner, 1910 - Madagascar
- Paracoptacra Karsch, 1896 - equatorial Africa
- Parepistaurus Karsch, 1896 - central & southern Africa
- Physocrobylus Dirsh, 1951 - Tanzania
- Pirithoicus Uvarov, 1940 - India
- Poecilocerastis Ramme, 1929 - central Africa
- Pseudotraulia - monotypic - P, cornuata Laosinchai & Jago, 1980 - China, Thailand
- Rhopaloceracris Tinkham, 1940 - eastern China, Viet Nam
- Ruwenzoracris Rehn, 1914 - equatorial Africa
