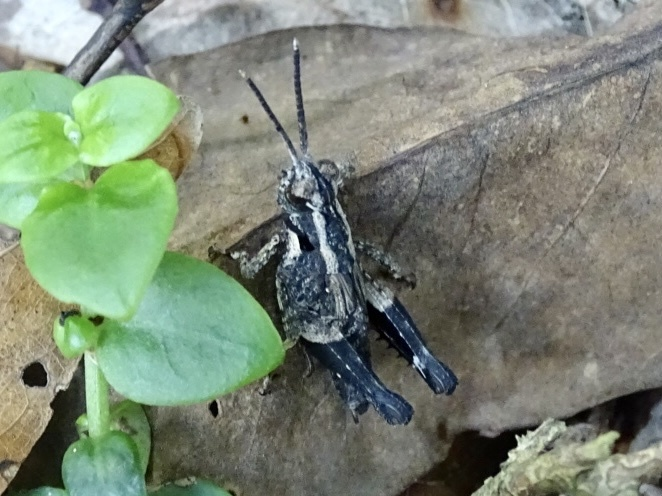
- Traulia ornata, Hong Kong

Scientific classification
- Kingdom: Animalia
- Phylum: Arthropoda
- Clade: Pancrustacea
- Class: Insecta
- Order: Orthoptera
- Suborder: Caelifera
- Family: Acrididae
- Subfamily: Catantopinae
- Tribe: Mesambriini
- Genus: Traulia
- Species: T. ornata

Binomial name
- Traulia ornata Shiraki, 1910

= Traulia ornata =

Species of short-horned grasshopper

Traulia ornata is a species of short-horned grasshopper in the family Acrididae. It is found in south and eastern Asia.

== Subspecies ==
These subspecies belong to the species Traulia ornata:

- Traulia ornata amamiensis Yamasaki, 1966
- Traulia ornata chui Yamasaki, 1991
- Traulia ornata iriomotensis Yamasaki, 1966
- Traulia ornata ishigakiensis Yamasaki, 1966
- Traulia ornata okinawaensis
- Traulia ornata okinawensis Yamasaki, 1966
- Traulia ornata ornata Shiraki, 1910
- Traulia ornata yonaguniensis Yamasaki, 1966
