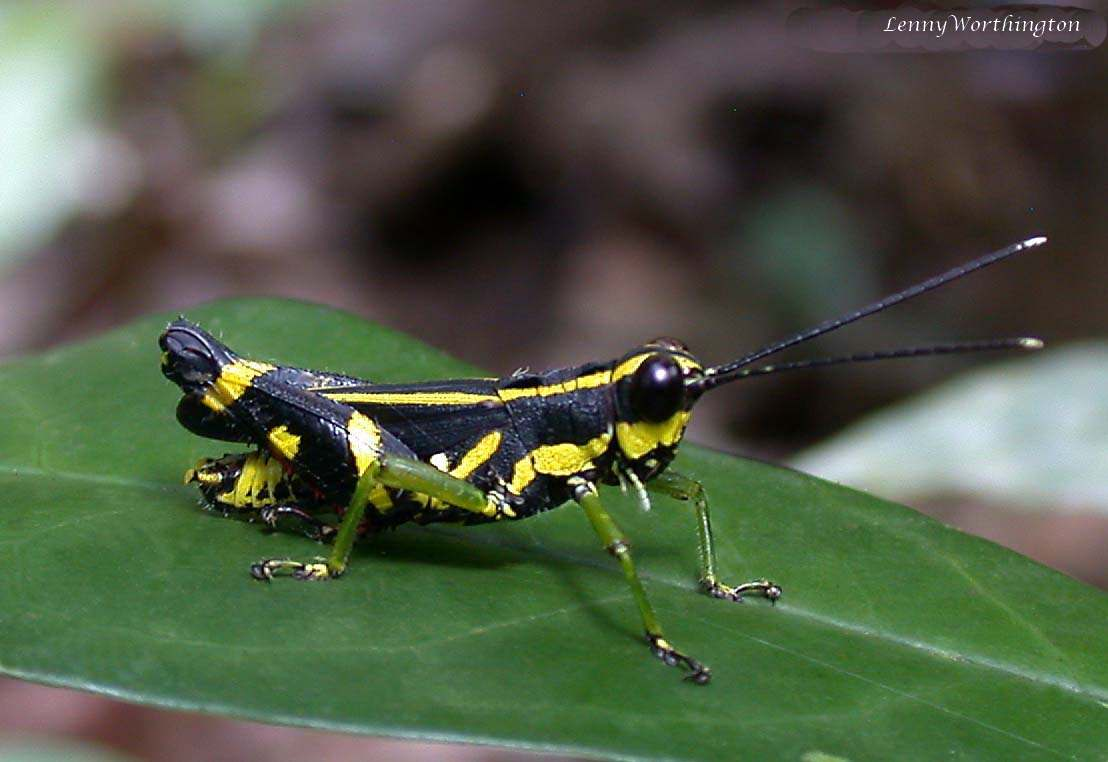
- Traulia azureipennis, Thailand

Scientific classification
- Kingdom: Animalia
- Phylum: Arthropoda
- Clade: Pancrustacea
- Class: Insecta
- Order: Orthoptera
- Suborder: Caelifera
- Family: Acrididae
- Subfamily: Catantopinae
- Tribe: Mesambriini
- Genus: Traulia
- Species: T. azureipennis

Binomial name
- Traulia azureipennis (Serville, 1838)

= Traulia azureipennis =

Species of grasshopper

Traulia azureipennis is a species of grasshopper in the family Acrididae. It is found in Southeast Asia.

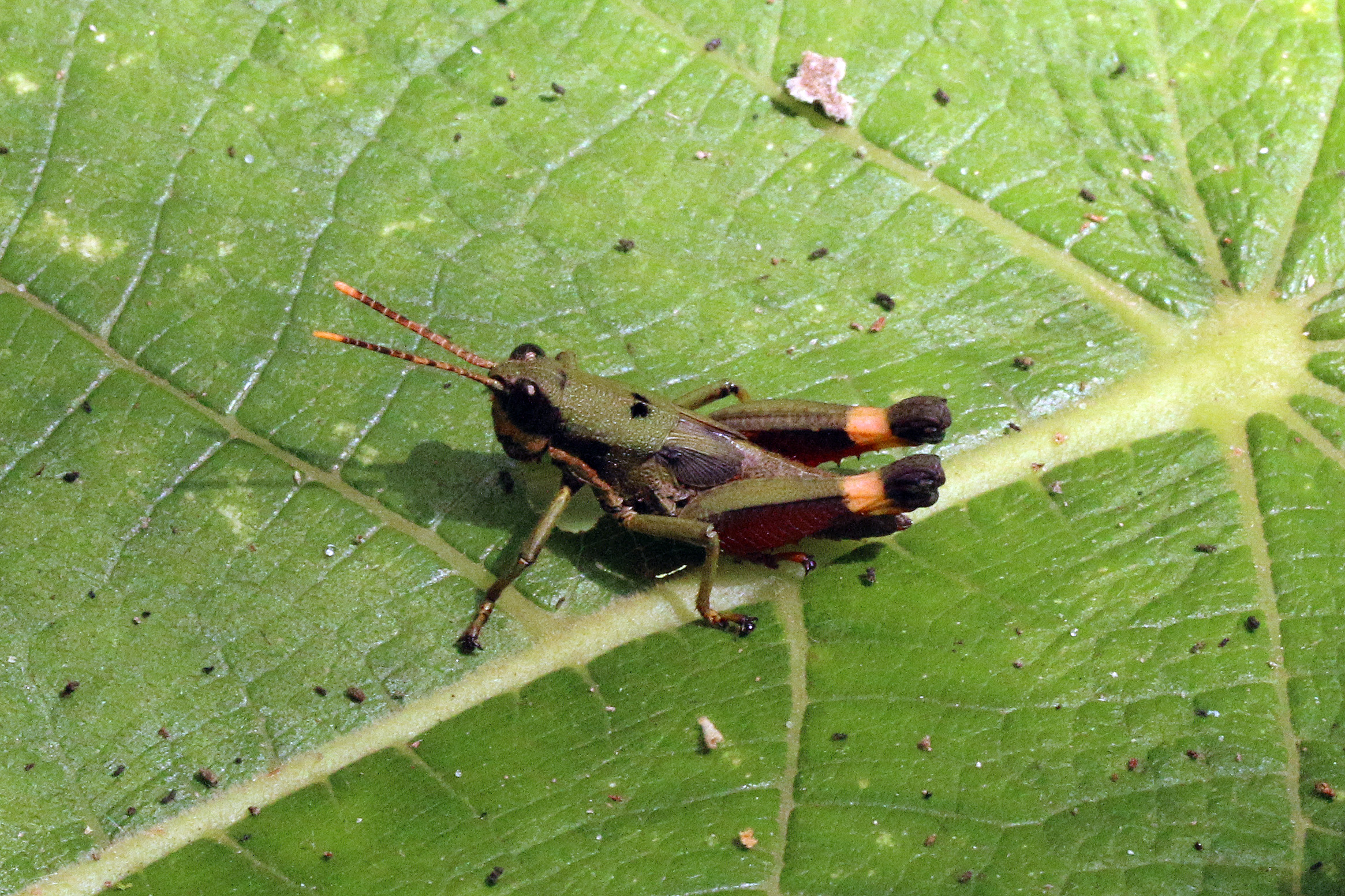
T. azureipennis brown form nymph

== Subspecies ==
These subspecies belong to the species Traulia azureipennis:

- Traulia azureipennis atra Willemse, 1921
- Traulia azureipennis azureipennis (Serville, 1838)
