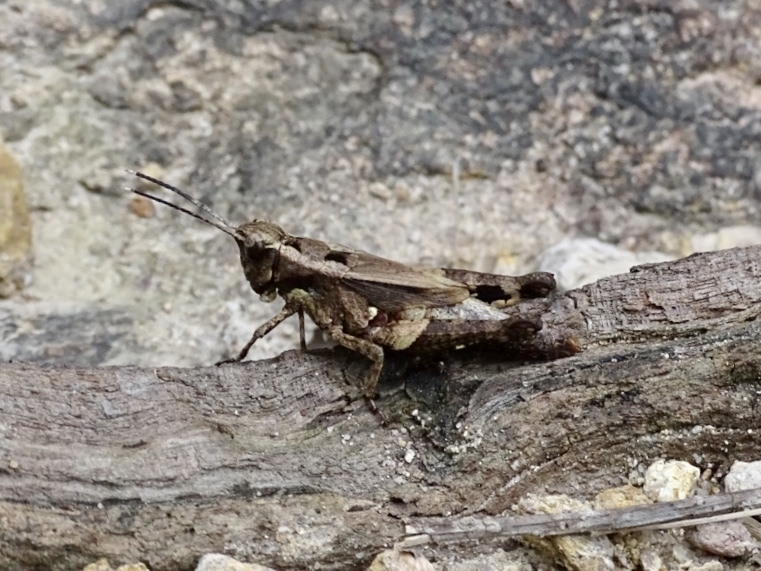
- Traulia orientalis, Hong Kong

Scientific classification
- Kingdom: Animalia
- Phylum: Arthropoda
- Clade: Pancrustacea
- Class: Insecta
- Order: Orthoptera
- Suborder: Caelifera
- Family: Acrididae
- Subfamily: Catantopinae
- Tribe: Mesambriini
- Genus: Traulia
- Species: T. orientalis

Binomial name
- Traulia orientalis Ramme, 1941

= Traulia orientalis =

Species of short-horned grasshopper

Traulia orientalis is a species of short-horned grasshopper in the family Acrididae. It is found in eastern and southeastern Asia.
