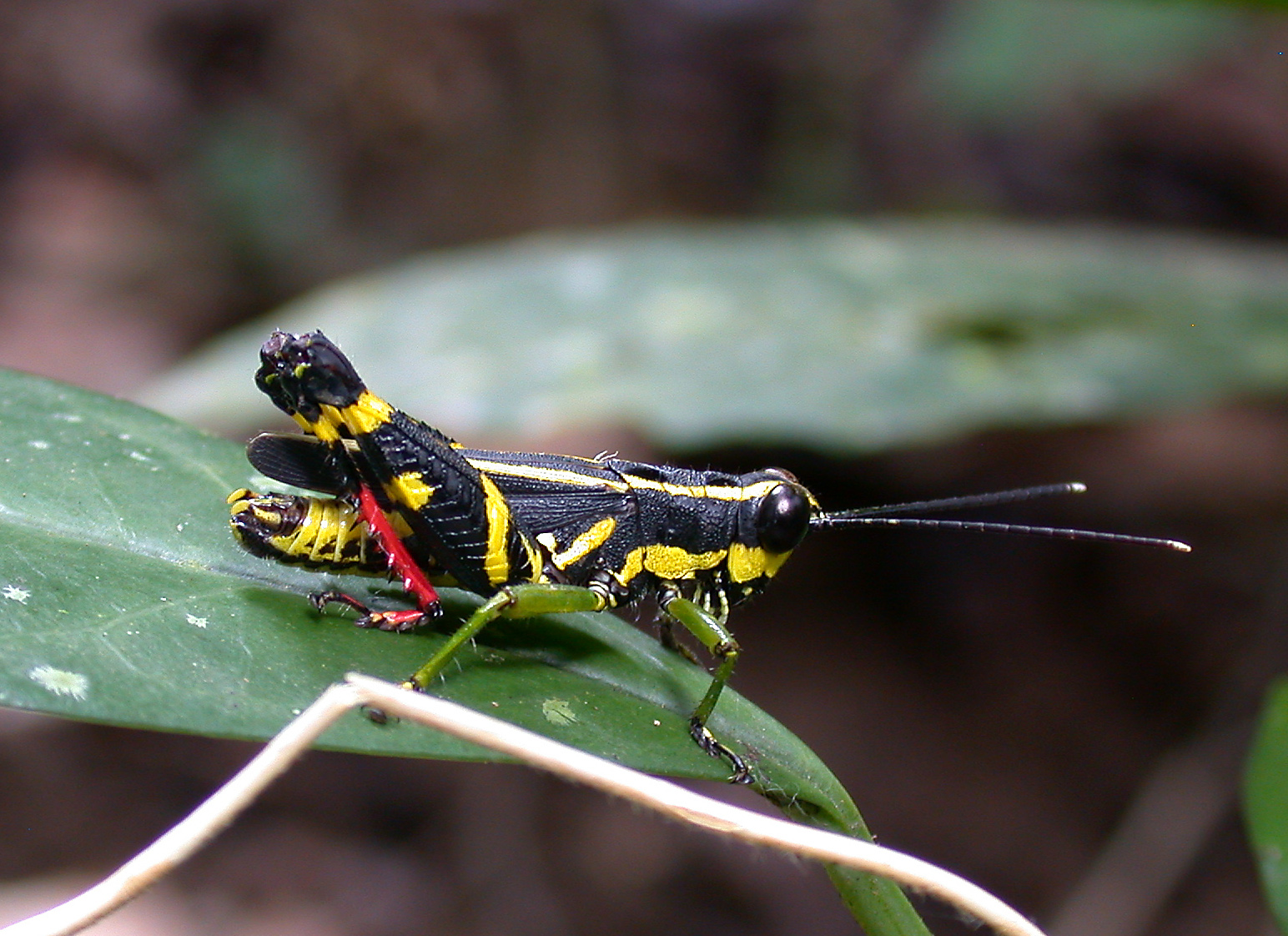
- Traulia azureipennis

Scientific classification
- Kingdom: Animalia
- Phylum: Arthropoda
- Clade: Pancrustacea
- Class: Insecta
- Order: Orthoptera
- Suborder: Caelifera
- Family: Acrididae
- Tribe: Mesambriini
- Genus: Traulia; Stål, 1873

= Traulia =

Genus of grasshoppers

Traulia is a genus of grasshoppers in the subfamily Catantopinae; it was considered typical of tribe Trauliini, but is now placed in the tribe Mesambriini. A majority of species are found in Southeast Asia.

== Species ==
The Orthoptera Species File lists:

1. Traulia affinis (Haan, 1842)
2. Traulia angustipennis Bi, 1986
3. Traulia annandalei Bolívar, 1917
4. Traulia antennata Bolívar, 1917
5. Traulia aphanea Willemse, 1928
6. Traulia aurora Willemse, 1921
7. Traulia azureipennis (Serville, 1838)
8. Traulia bidentata Willemse, 1957
9. Traulia bimaculata Willemse, 1932
10. Traulia borneensis Willemse, 1921
11. Traulia brachypeza Bi, 1986
12. Traulia brevipennis Zheng, Ma & Li, 1994
13. Traulia brunneri Bolívar, 1917
14. Traulia elegans Willemse, 1921
15. Traulia flavoannulata (Stål, 1861)
  type species (as Acridium flavo-annulatum Stål), locality Java.
16. Traulia gaoligongshanensis Zheng & Mao, 1996
17. Traulia grossa Ramme, 1941
18. Traulia haani Willemse, 1921
19. Traulia hainanensis Liu & Li, 1995
20. Traulia hosei Willemse, 1935
21. Traulia hyalinala Zheng & Huo, 1999
22. Traulia incompleta Willemse, 1921
23. Traulia insularis Willemse, 1928
24. Traulia javana Ramme, 1941
25. Traulia jiulianshanensis Xiangyu, Wang & Liu, 1997
26. Traulia kukenthali Ramme, 1941
27. Traulia lineata Brunner von Wattenwyl, 1898
28. Traulia lofaoshana Tinkham, 1940
29. Traulia media Willemse, 1935
30. Traulia melli Ramme, 1941
31. Traulia mindanaensis Ramme, 1941
32. Traulia minuta Huang & Xia, 1985
33. Traulia nigrifurcula Zheng & Jiang, 2002
34. Traulia nigritibialis Bi, 1986
35. Traulia orchotibialis Liang & Zheng, 1986
36. Traulia orientalis Ramme, 1941
37. Traulia ornata Shiraki, 1910
38. Traulia palawana Willemse, 1935
39. Traulia philippina Bolívar, 1917
40. Traulia pictilis Stål, 1877
41. Traulia pumila Willemse, 1932
42. Traulia rosea Willemse, 1921
43. Traulia sanguinipes Stål, 1878
44. Traulia stali Bolívar, 1917
45. Traulia stigmatica Bolívar, 1898
46. Traulia sumatrensis Bolívar, 1898
47. Traulia superba Willemse, 1930
48. Traulia szetschuanensis Ramme, 1941
49. Traulia tibialis Ramme, 1941
50. Traulia tonkinensis Bolívar, 1917
51. Traulia tristis Ramme, 1941
52. Traulia xanthostigma Ramme, 1941
53. Traulia xiai Cao, Shi & Yin, 2015
54. Traulia yifengensis Wang, Xiangyu & Liu, 1997

== Gallery ==
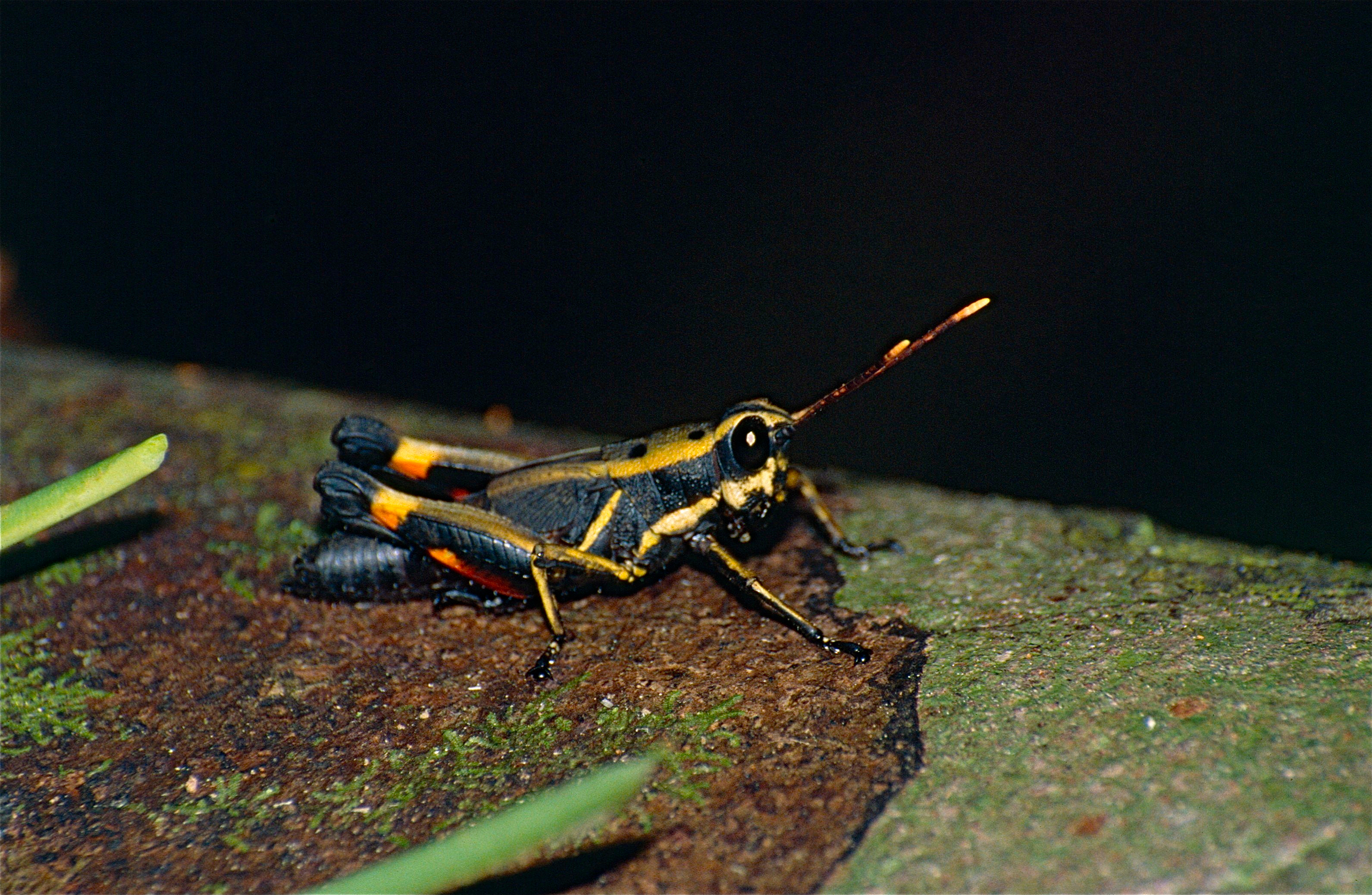
Unidentified Traulia spp.

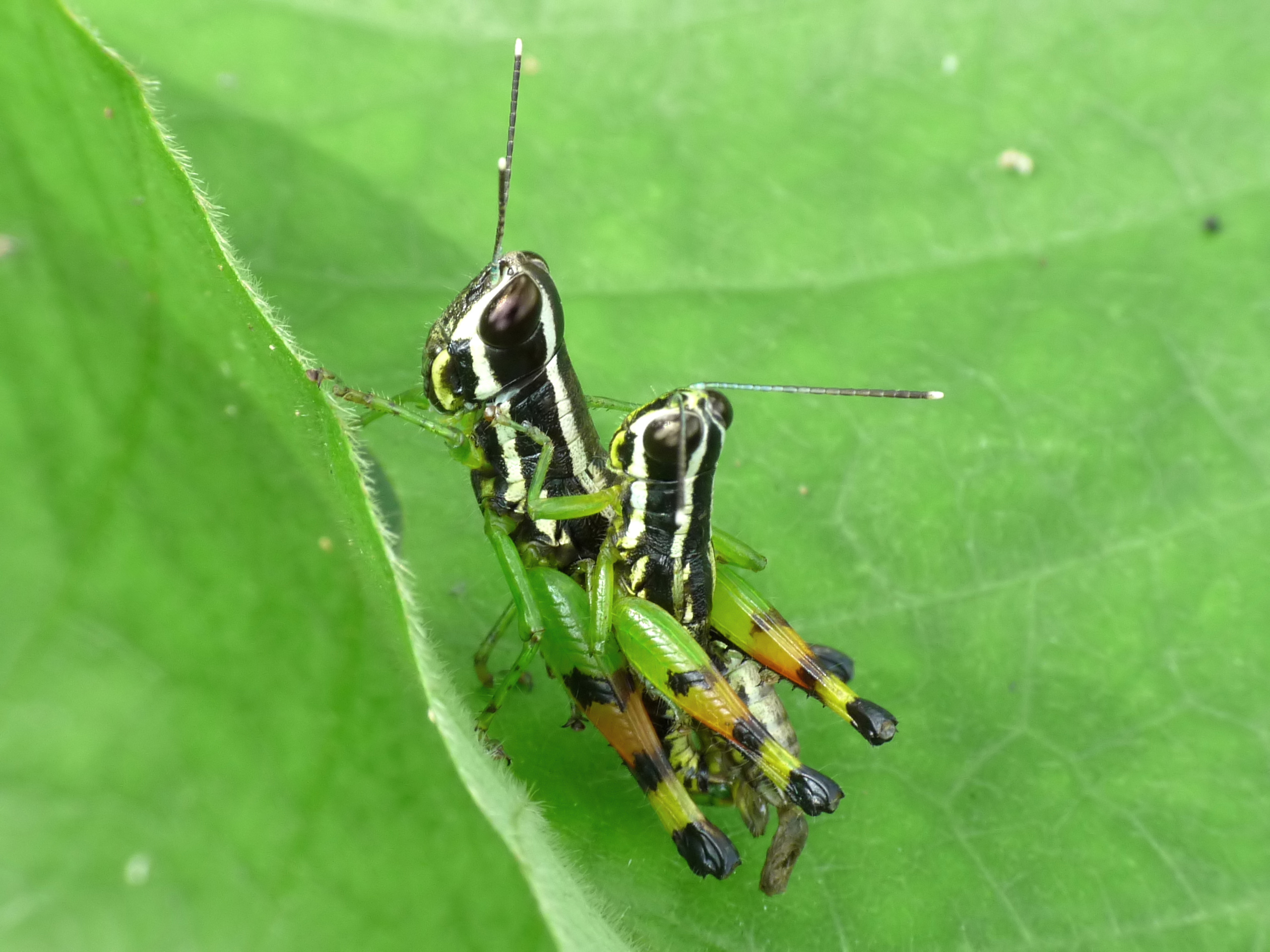

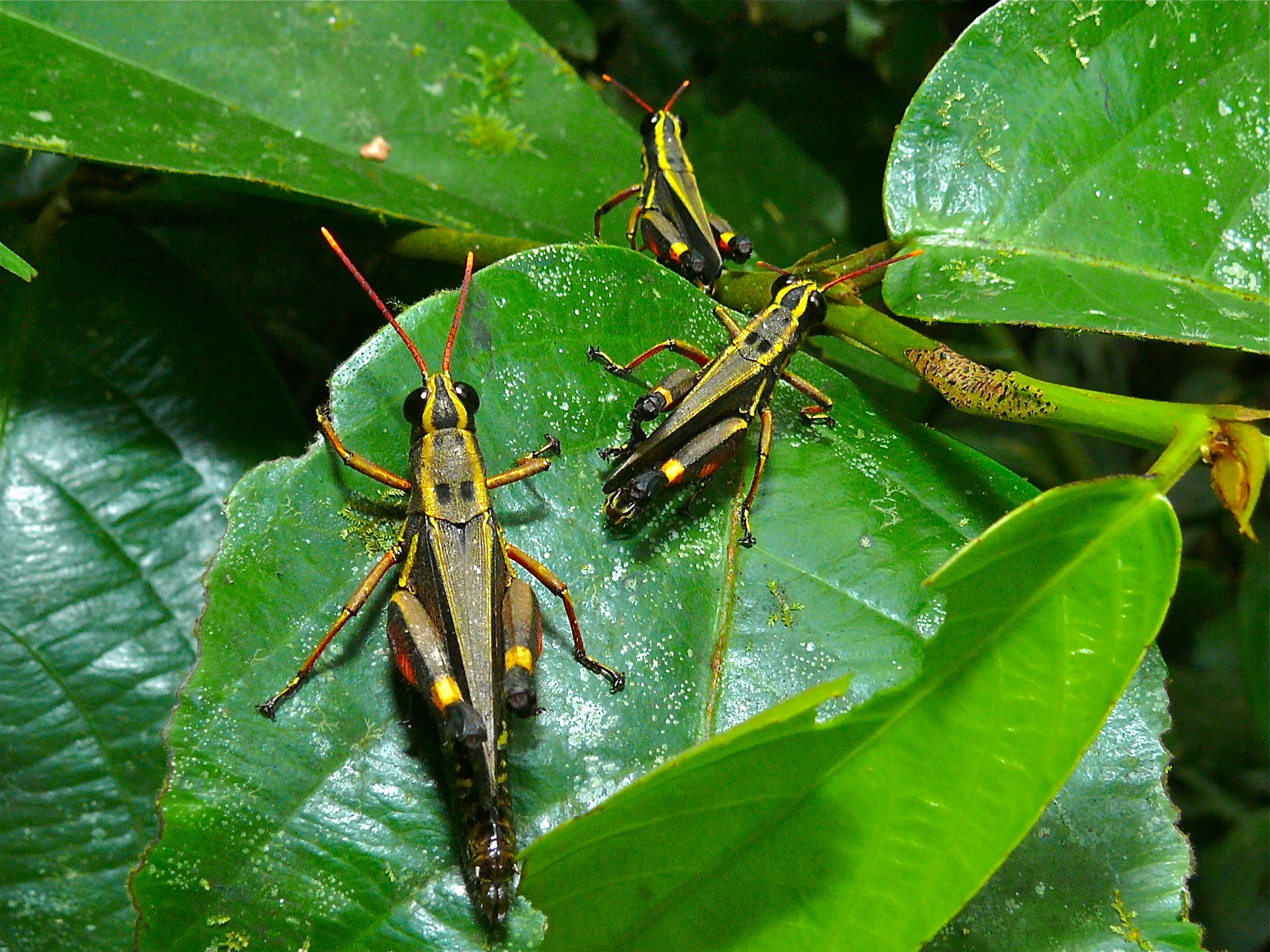

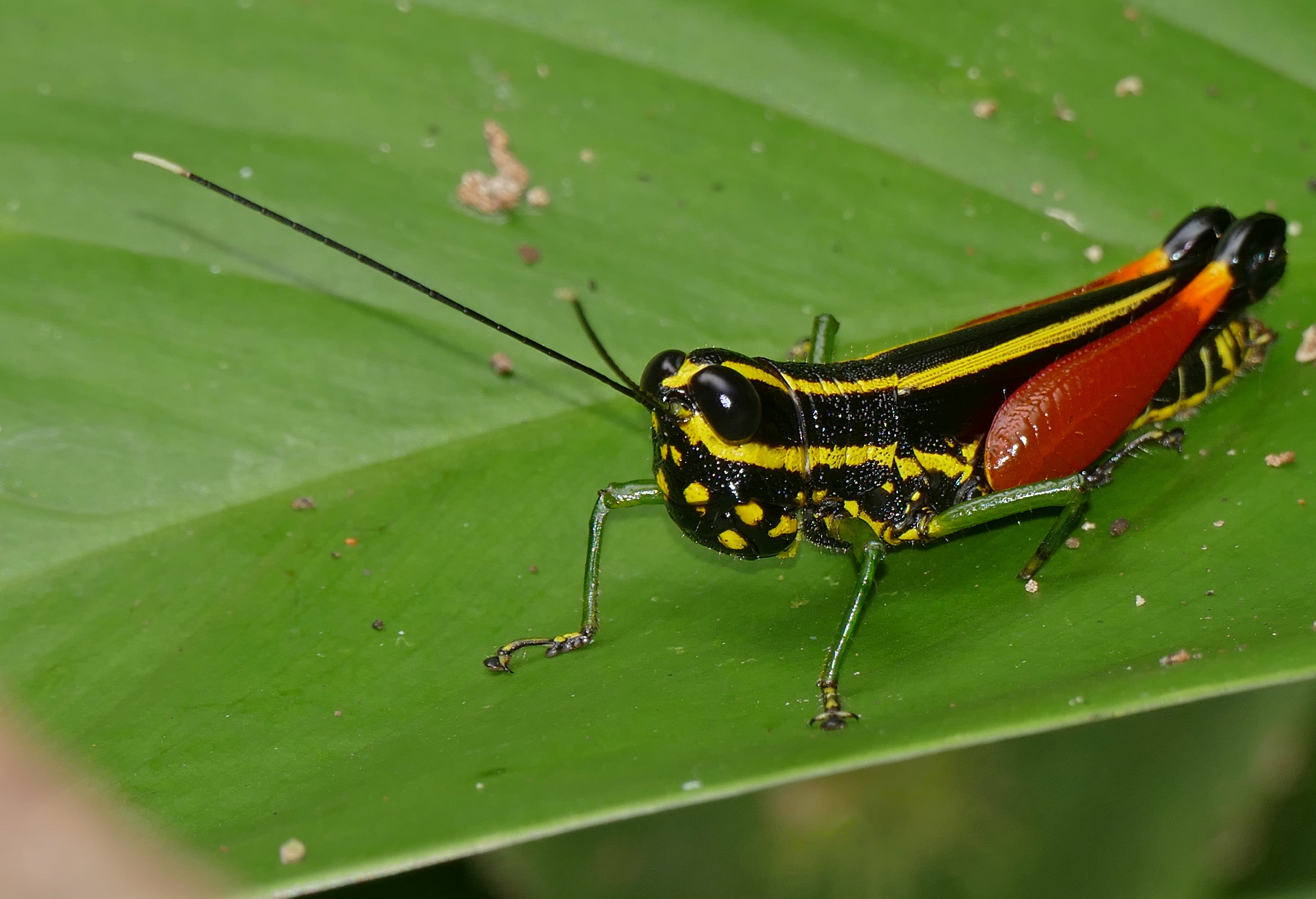
