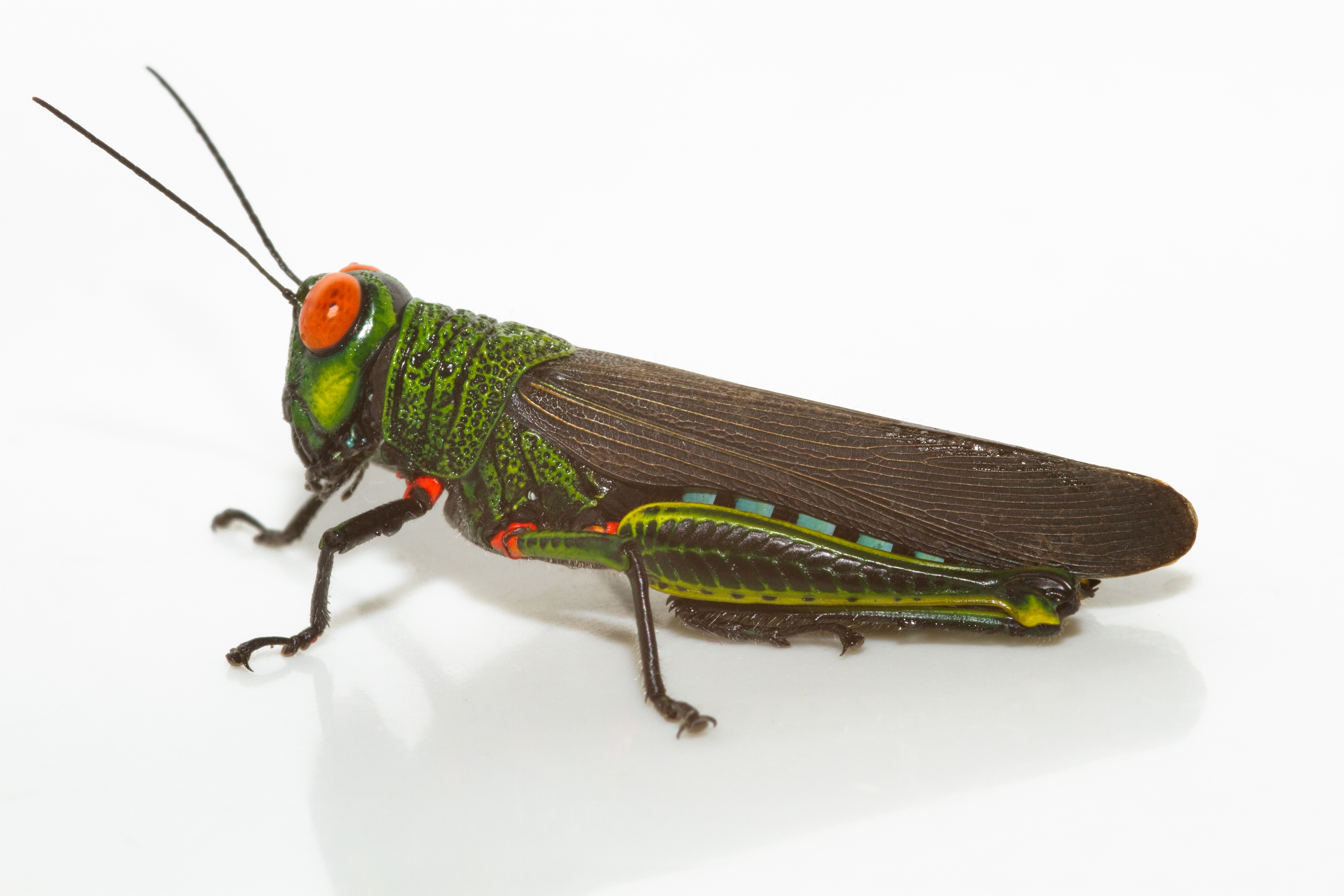
- Coscineuta coxalis, Panama

Scientific classification
- Kingdom: Animalia
- Phylum: Arthropoda
- Clade: Pancrustacea
- Class: Insecta
- Order: Orthoptera
- Suborder: Caelifera
- Family: Acrididae
- Subfamily: Proctolabinae
- Tribe: Coscineutini
- Genus: Coscineuta
- Species: C. coxalis

Binomial name
- Coscineuta coxalis (Serville, 1838)

= Coscineuta coxalis =

Species of grasshopper

Coscineuta coxalis is a species of short-horned grasshopper in the family Acrididae. It is found in the Neotropics.
