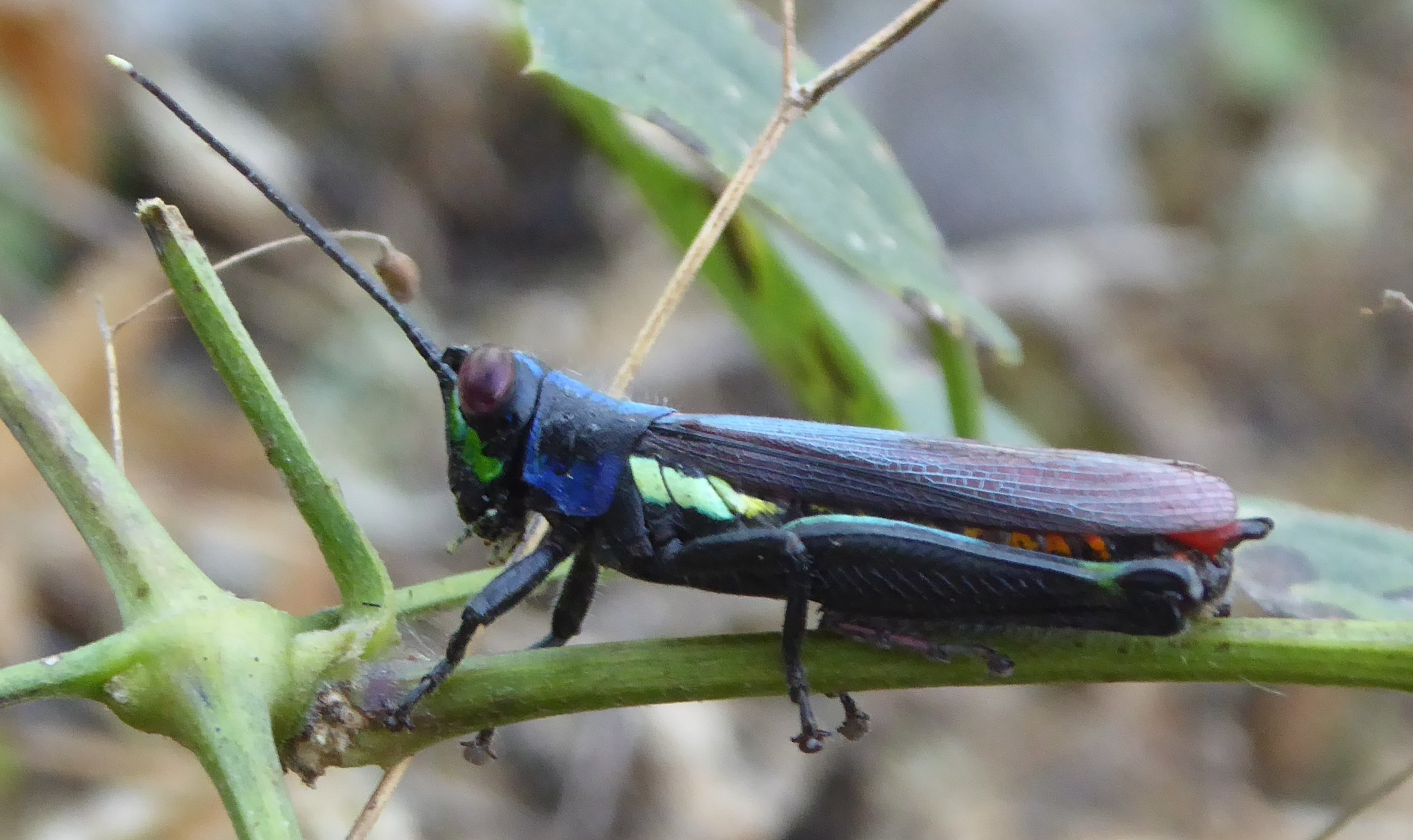
- Proctolabus mexicanus, Mexico

Scientific classification
- Kingdom: Animalia
- Phylum: Arthropoda
- Clade: Pancrustacea
- Class: Insecta
- Order: Orthoptera
- Suborder: Caelifera
- Family: Acrididae
- Subfamily: Proctolabinae
- Tribe: Proctolabini
- Subtribe: Proctolabina
- Genus: Proctolabus
- Species: P. mexicanus

Binomial name
- Proctolabus mexicanus (Saussure, 1859)

= Proctolabus mexicanus =

Species of short-horned grasshopper

Proctolabus mexicanus is a species of short-horned grasshopper in the family Acrididae. It is found in Mexico.
