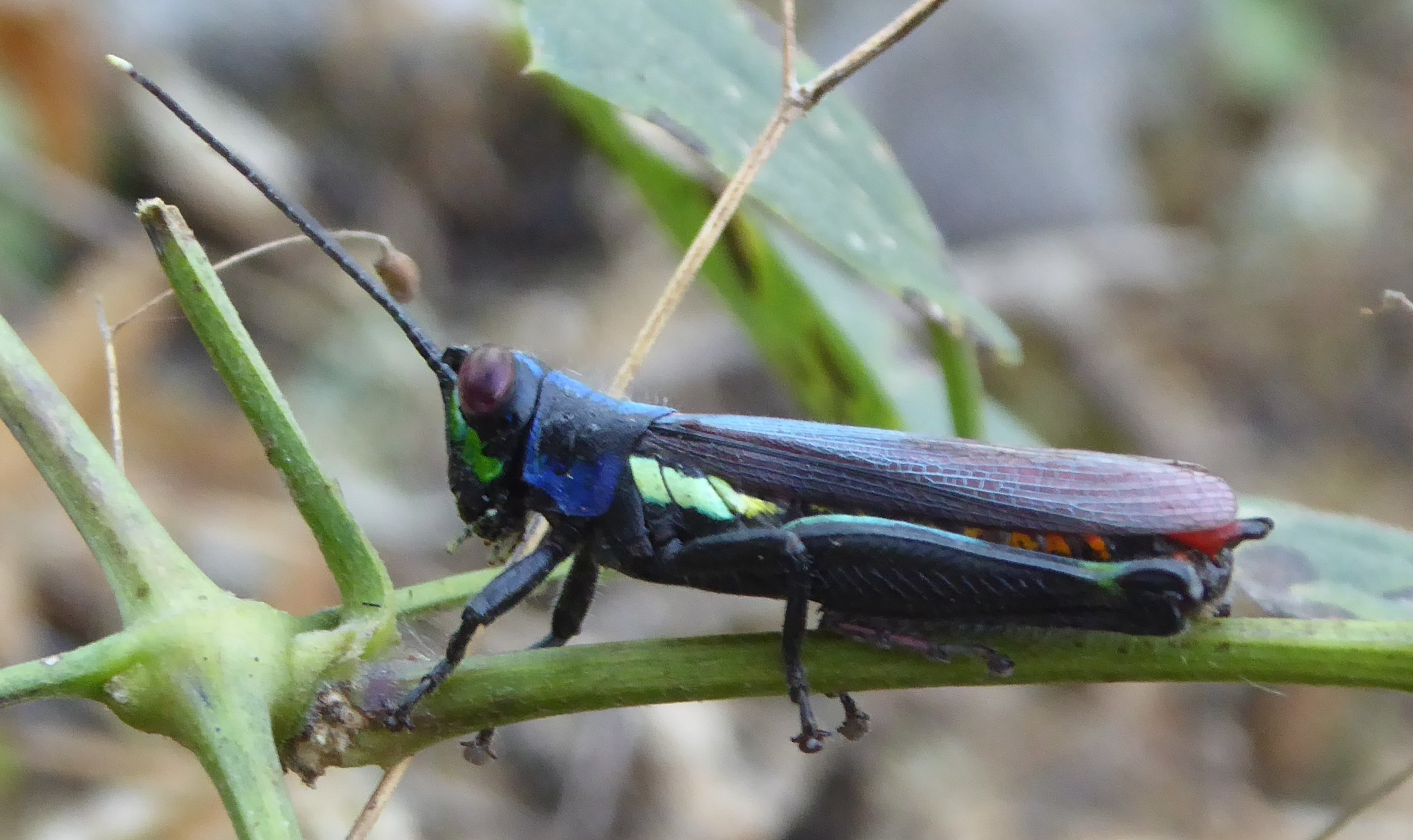
- Proctolabus mexicanus, Mexico

Scientific classification
- Kingdom: Animalia
- Phylum: Arthropoda
- Clade: Pancrustacea
- Class: Insecta
- Order: Orthoptera
- Suborder: Caelifera
- Family: Acrididae
- Subfamily: Proctolabinae
- Tribe: Proctolabini
- Subtribe: Proctolabina
- Genus: Proctolabus; Saussure, 1859

= Proctolabus =

Genus of grasshoppers

Proctolabus is a genus of short-horned grasshoppers in the family Acrididae. There are about eight described species in Proctolabus, found in Mexico and the southwestern United States.

== Species ==
These species belong to the genus Proctolabus:

- Proctolabus brachypterus Bruner, 1908
- Proctolabus cerciatus Hebard, 1925
- Proctolabus chiapensis Descamps, 1976
- Proctolabus diferens Márquez Mayaudón, 1963
- Proctolabus edentatus Descamps, 1976
- Proctolabus gracilis Bruner, 1908
- Proctolabus mexicanus (Saussure, 1859)
- Proctolabus oaxacae Descamps, 1976
