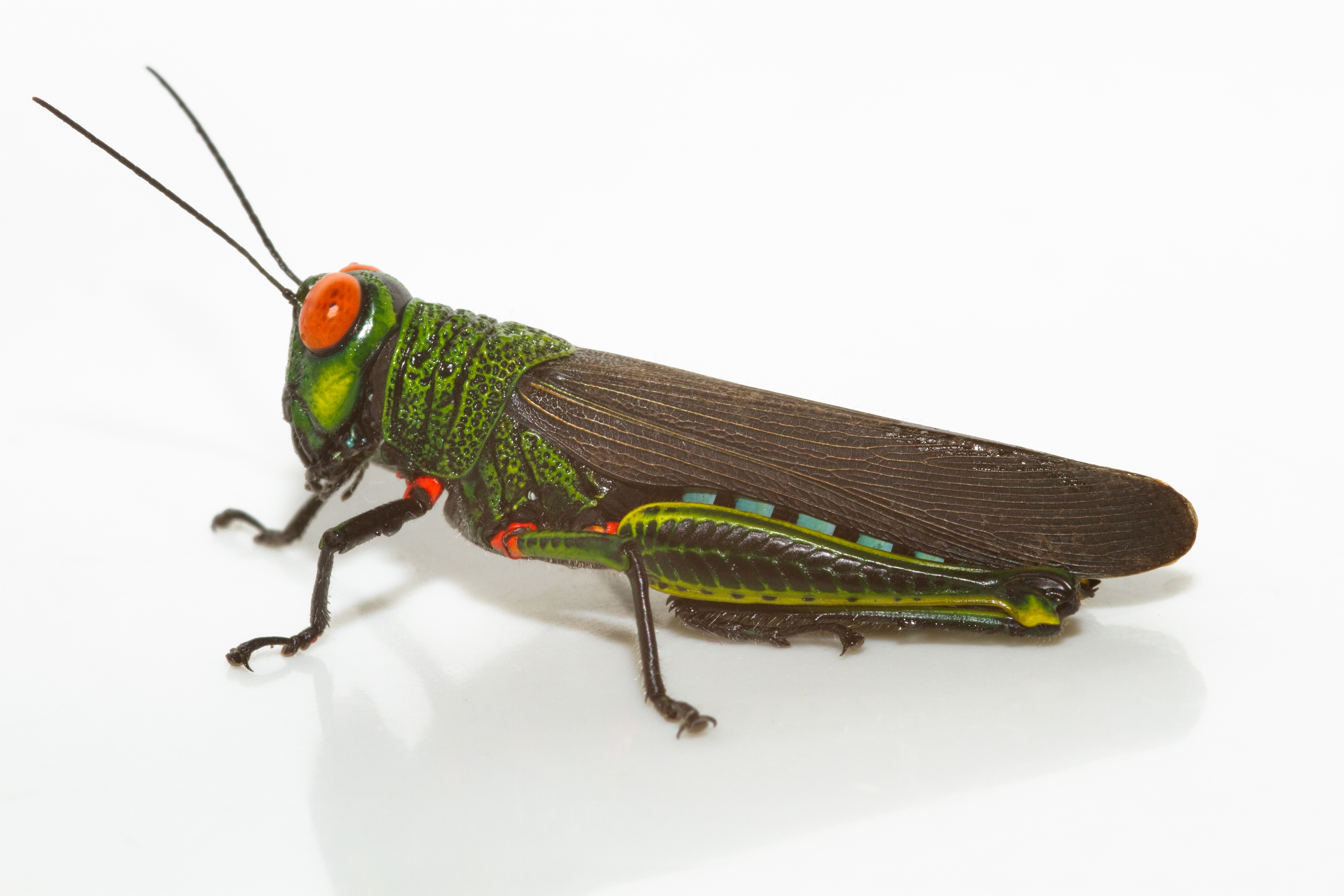
- Coscineuta coxalis

Scientific classification
- Kingdom: Animalia
- Phylum: Arthropoda
- Clade: Pancrustacea
- Class: Insecta
- Order: Orthoptera
- Suborder: Caelifera
- Family: Acrididae
- Subfamily: Proctolabinae
- Tribe: Coscineutini
- Genus: Coscineuta; Stål, 1873

= Coscineuta =

Genus of grasshoppers

Coscineuta is a genus of short-horned grasshoppers in the family Acrididae. There are about eight described species in Coscineuta, found in the Neotropics and South America.

== Species ==
These species belong to the genus Coscineuta:

- Coscineuta cicatricosa Bolívar, 1890
- Coscineuta coxalis (Serville, 1838)
- Coscineuta haematonota (Burmeister, 1838)
- Coscineuta marginalis (Walker, 1870)
- Coscineuta matensis Rehn, 1918
- Coscineuta pulchripes (Gerstaecker, 1889)
- Coscineuta trochilus (Gerstaecker, 1873)
- Coscineuta virens (Thunberg, 1815) (Moruga Grasshopper)
