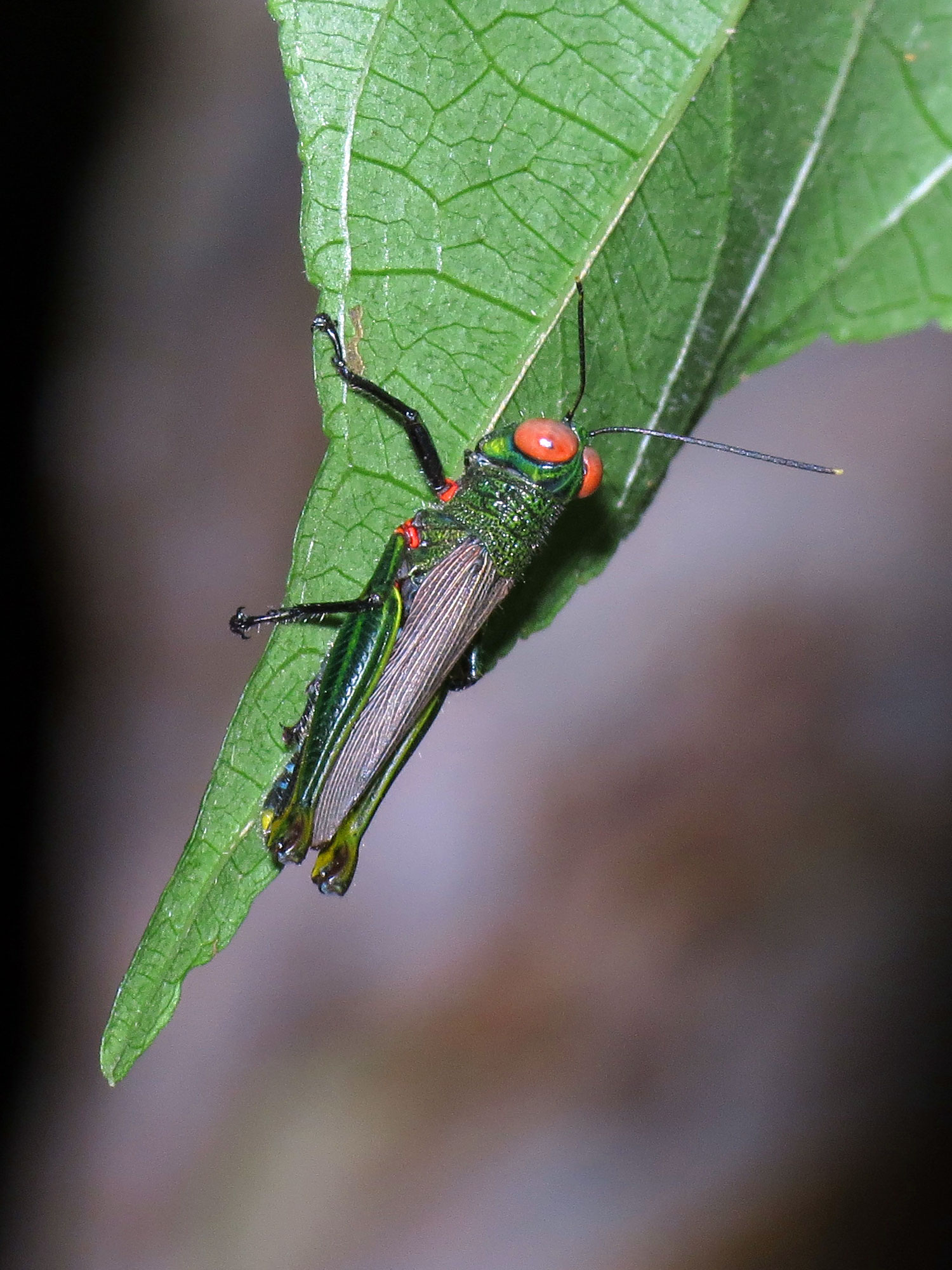
- Coscineuta coxalis, Panama.

Scientific classification
- Kingdom: Animalia
- Phylum: Arthropoda
- Clade: Pancrustacea
- Class: Insecta
- Order: Orthoptera
- Suborder: Caelifera
- Superfamily: Acridoidea
- Family: Acrididae
- Subfamily: Proctolabinae; Amédégnato, 1974

Tribes
- Coscineutini Brunner von Wattenwyl, 1893; Proctolabini Amédégnato, 1974

= Proctolabinae =

Subfamily of grasshoppers

Proctolabinae is a subfamily of grasshoppers in the family Acrididae. There are more than 20 genera and 210 described species which are found in South America.

== Genera ==
The following genera, in 2 tribes, belong to the subfamily Proctolabinae:

=== Coscineutini ===
synonym: Coscineutae Brunner von Wattenwyl, 1893

- Coscineuta Stål, 1873

=== Proctolabini ===
1. Adelotettix Bruner, 1910
2. Ampelophilus Hebard, 1924
3. Azotocerus Descamps, 1976
4. Balachowskyacris Descamps & Amédégnato, 1972
5. Cercoceracris Descamps, 1976
6. Cryptocloeus Descamps, 1976
7. Dendrophilacris Descamps, 1976
8. Dorstacris Descamps, 1978
9. Drymacris Descamps & Rowell, 1978
10. Drymophilacris Descamps, 1976
11. Eucephalacris Descamps, 1976
12. Eucerotettix Descamps, 1980
13. Halticacris Descamps, 1976
14. Harpotettix Descamps, 1981
15. Kritacris Descamps, 1976
16. Leioscapheus Bruner, 1907
17. Lithoscirtus Bruner, 1908
18. Loretacris Amédégnato & Poulain, 1987
19. Paratela Descamps & Rowell, 1978
20. Pareucephalacris Descamps, 1976
21. Poecilocloeus Bruner, 1910
22. Proctolabus Saussure, 1859
23. Saltonacris Descamps, 1976
24. Tela Hebard, 1932
25. Witotacris Descamps, 1976
26. Ypsophilacris Descamps, 1980
27. Zodiacris Descamps, 1980
28. Zosperamerus Bruner, 1908
