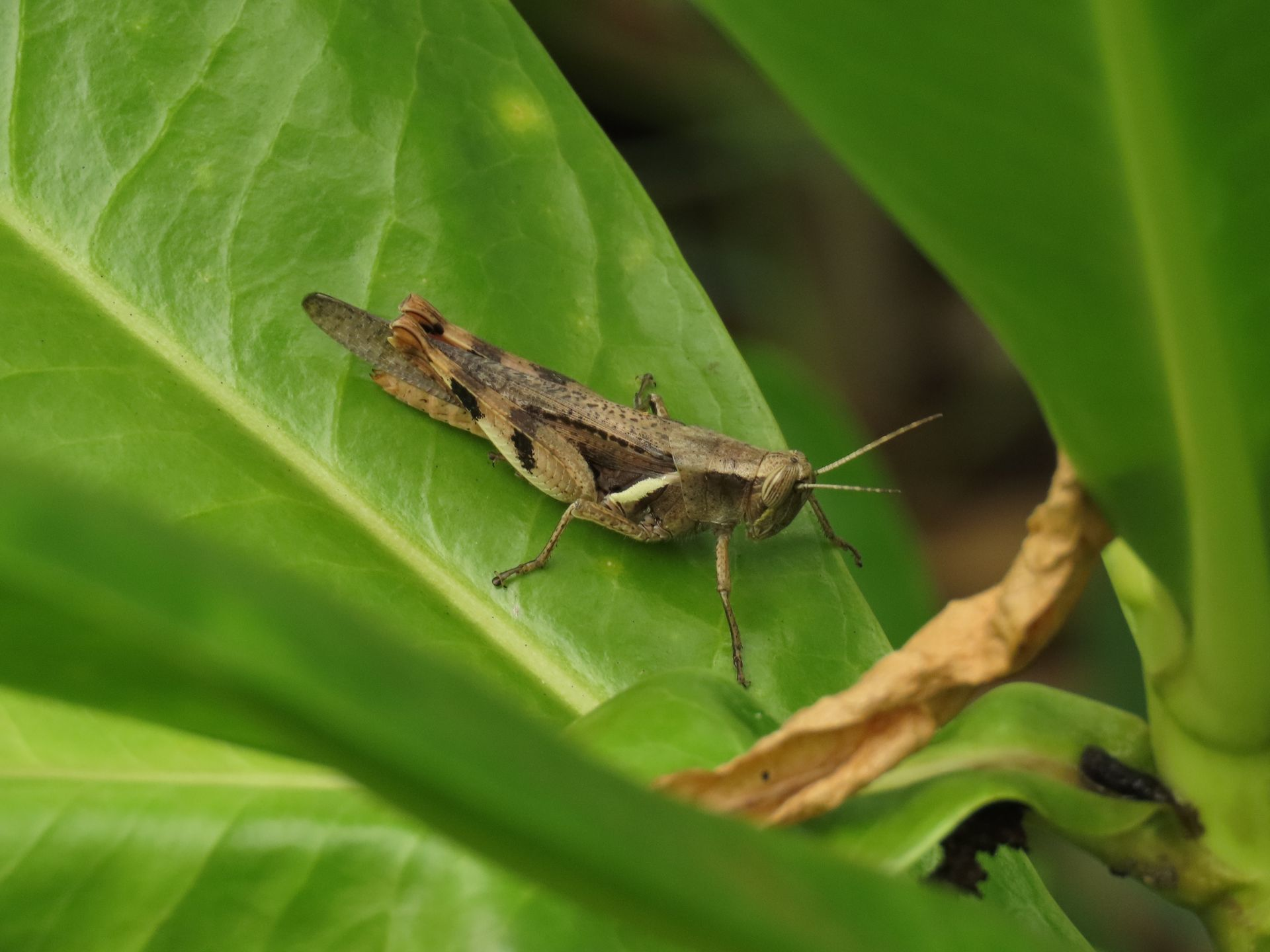
- In Australia

Scientific classification
- Kingdom: Animalia
- Phylum: Arthropoda
- Clade: Pancrustacea
- Class: Insecta
- Order: Orthoptera
- Suborder: Caelifera
- Family: Acrididae
- Subfamily: Catantopinae
- Tribe: Catantopini
- Subtribe: Catantopina
- Genus: Stenocatantops
- Species: S. angustifrons

Binomial name
- Stenocatantops angustifrons (Walker, 1870)

= Stenocatantops angustifrons =

Species of short-horned grasshopper

Stenocatantops angustifrons, the common tropical sharptail, is a species of short-horned grasshopper in the family Acrididae. It is found in Southeast Asia and Oceania as well as the north Australian savannas.
