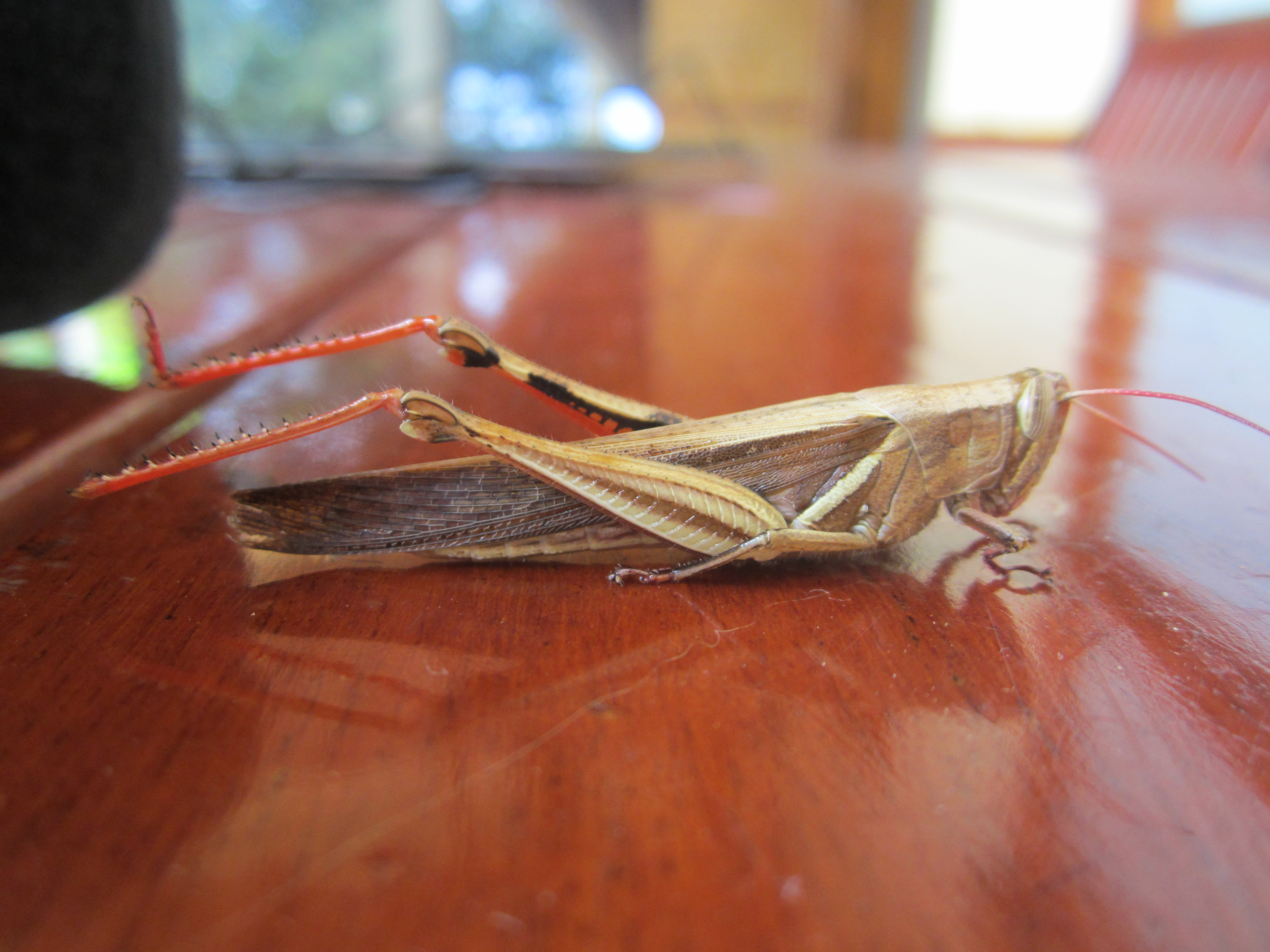
- Stenocatantops splendens, Vietnam

Scientific classification
- Kingdom: Animalia
- Phylum: Arthropoda
- Clade: Pancrustacea
- Class: Insecta
- Order: Orthoptera
- Suborder: Caelifera
- Family: Acrididae
- Subfamily: Catantopinae
- Tribe: Catantopini
- Subtribe: Catantopina
- Genus: Stenocatantops
- Species: S. splendens

Binomial name
- Stenocatantops splendens (Thunberg, 1815)

= Stenocatantops splendens =

Species of short-horned grasshopper

Stenocatantops splendens is a species of short-horned grasshopper in the family Acrididae. It is found in Indomalaya and eastern Asia.
