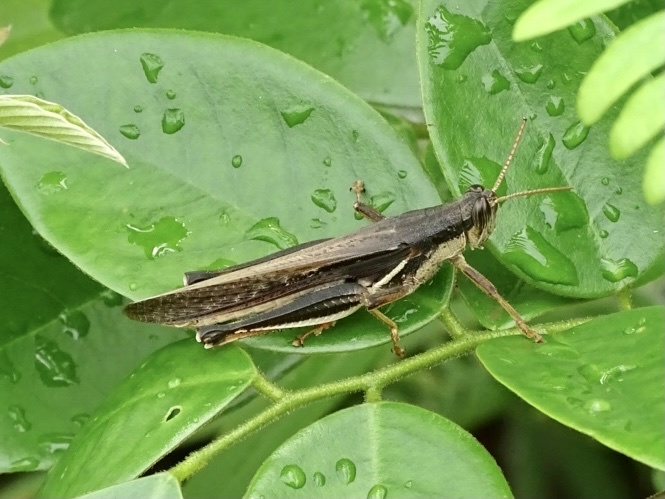
- Stenocatantops mistshenkoi

Scientific classification
- Kingdom: Animalia
- Phylum: Arthropoda
- Clade: Pancrustacea
- Class: Insecta
- Order: Orthoptera
- Suborder: Caelifera
- Family: Acrididae
- Subtribe: Catantopina
- Genus: Stenocatantops; Dirsh, 1953

= Stenocatantops =

Genus of grasshoppers

Stenocatantops is a genus of grasshoppers in the family Acrididae and subfamily Catantopinae. The recorded distribution of species includes: India, China, Indo-China and Malesia through to Australia.

== Species ==
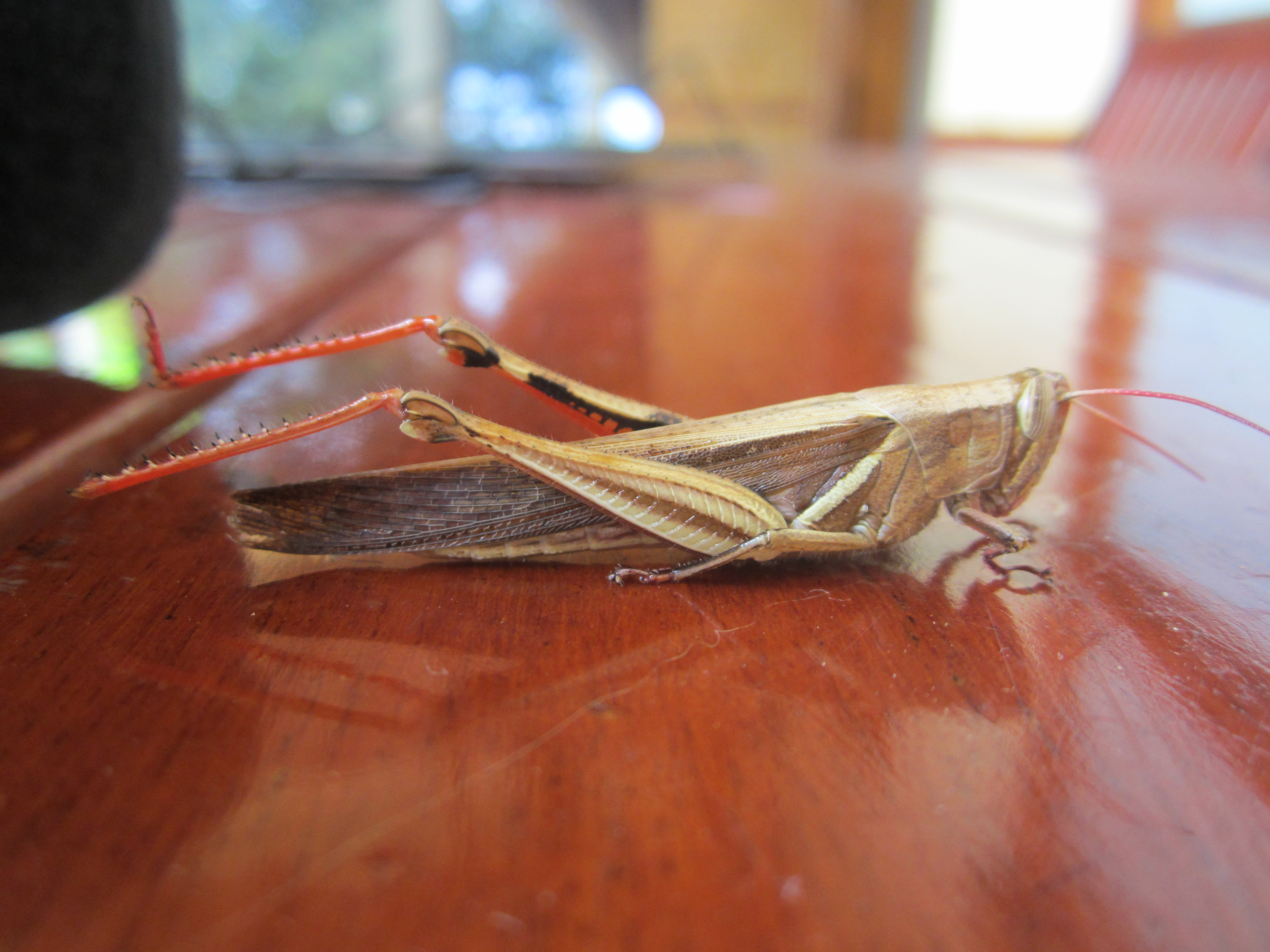
Stenocatantops splendens

The Orthoptera Species File lists:

- Stenocatantops angustifrons (Walker, 1870)
- Stenocatantops brevipennis Zhong & Zheng, 2004
- Stenocatantops cornelii Willemse, 1968
- Stenocatantops exinsula (Willemse, 1934)
- Stenocatantops immaculatus Willemse, 1956
- Stenocatantops isolatus Willemse, 1968
- Stenocatantops keyi Willemse, 1968
- Stenocatantops mistshenkoi Willemse, 1968
- Stenocatantops nigrovittatus Yin & Yin, 2005
- Stenocatantops pasighatinensis Swaminathan, Nagar & Swaminathan, 2018
- Stenocatantops philippinensis Willemse, 1968
- Stenocatantops splendens (Thunberg, 1815) - type species (as Gryllus splendens Thunberg
- Stenocatantops transversa Willemse, 1953
- Stenocatantops unicolor Yin & Yin, 2005
- Stenocatantops vitripennis (Sjöstedt, 1920)
