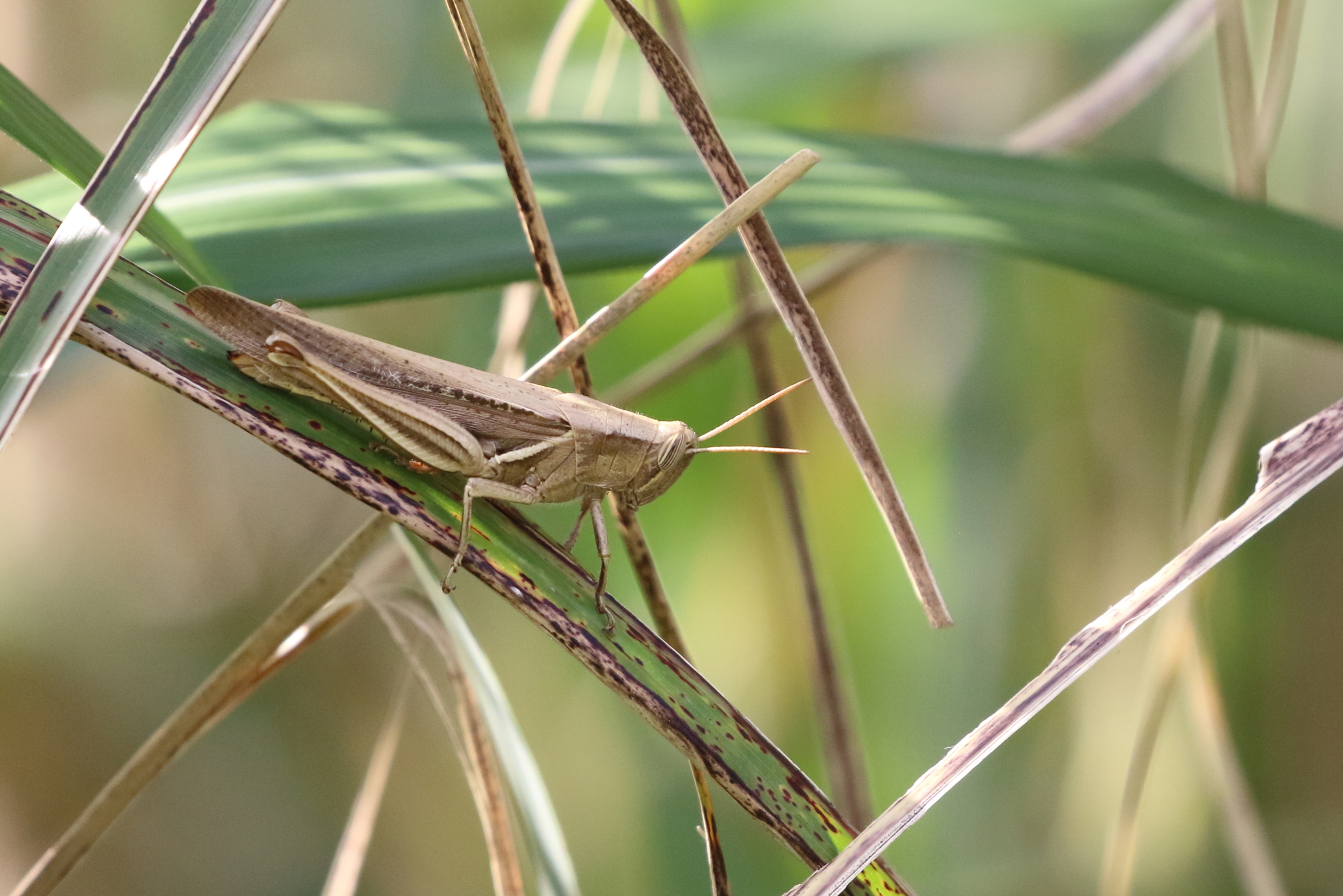
- Stenocatantops mistshenkoi, Okinawa

Scientific classification
- Kingdom: Animalia
- Phylum: Arthropoda
- Clade: Pancrustacea
- Class: Insecta
- Order: Orthoptera
- Suborder: Caelifera
- Family: Acrididae
- Subfamily: Catantopinae
- Tribe: Catantopini
- Subtribe: Catantopina
- Genus: Stenocatantops
- Species: S. mistshenkoi

Binomial name
- Stenocatantops mistshenkoi Willemse, 1968

= Stenocatantops mistshenkoi =

Species of short-horned grasshopper

Stenocatantops mistshenkoi is a species of short-horned grasshopper in the family Acrididae. It is found in eastern Asia, including China and Japan.

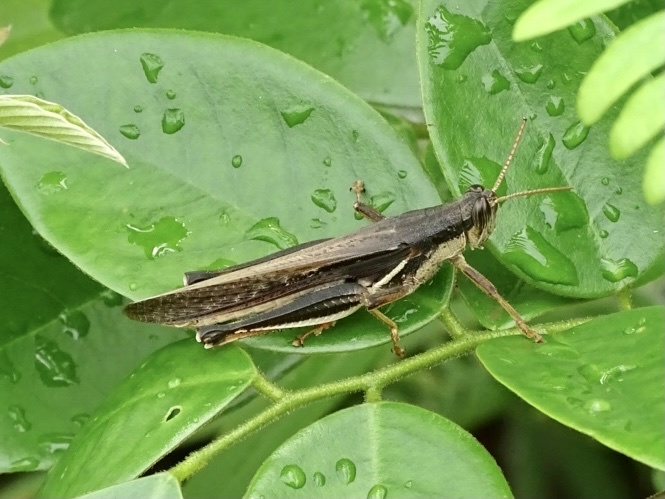
Stenocatantops mistshenkoi, Hong Kong
