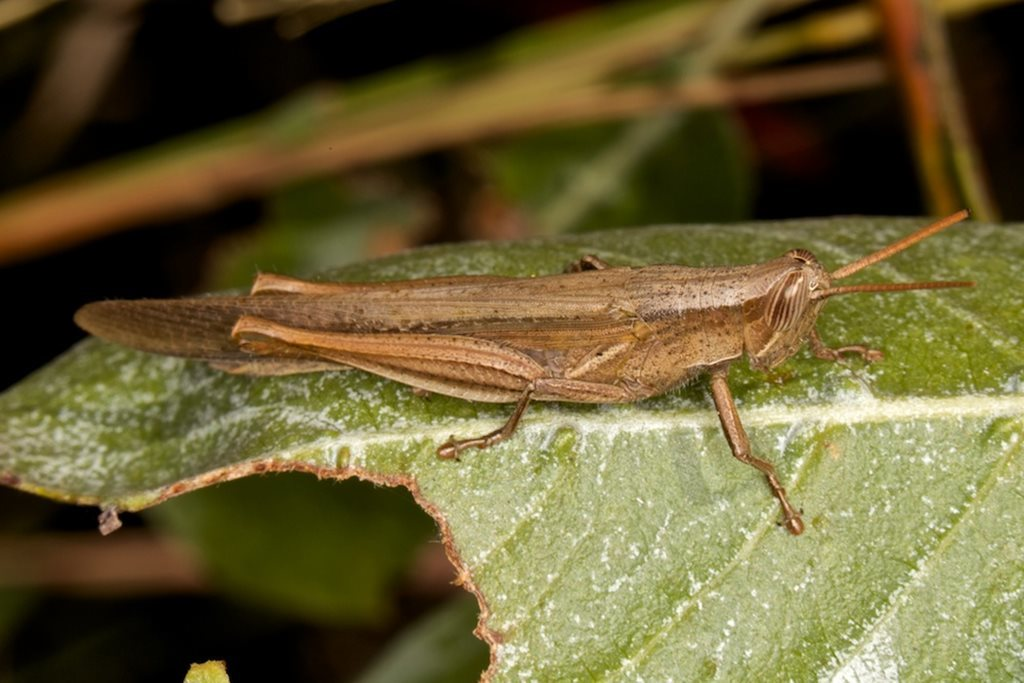

Scientific classification
- Kingdom: Animalia
- Phylum: Arthropoda
- Clade: Pancrustacea
- Class: Insecta
- Order: Orthoptera
- Suborder: Caelifera
- Family: Acrididae
- Genus: Stenocatantops
- Species: S. vitripennis

Binomial name
- Stenocatantops vitripennis Sjöstedt, 1920

Synonyms
- Catantops vitripennis Sjöstedt, 1920; Catantops australis Sjöstedt, 1921

= Stenocatantops vitripennis =

Species of insect

Stenocatantops vitripennis is a species of short-horned grasshopper in the family Acrididae. It is found in north Australian savannas in the wet season.

The adult female is 43 mm (1.7 in) and adult male is 34 mm (1.3 in).
