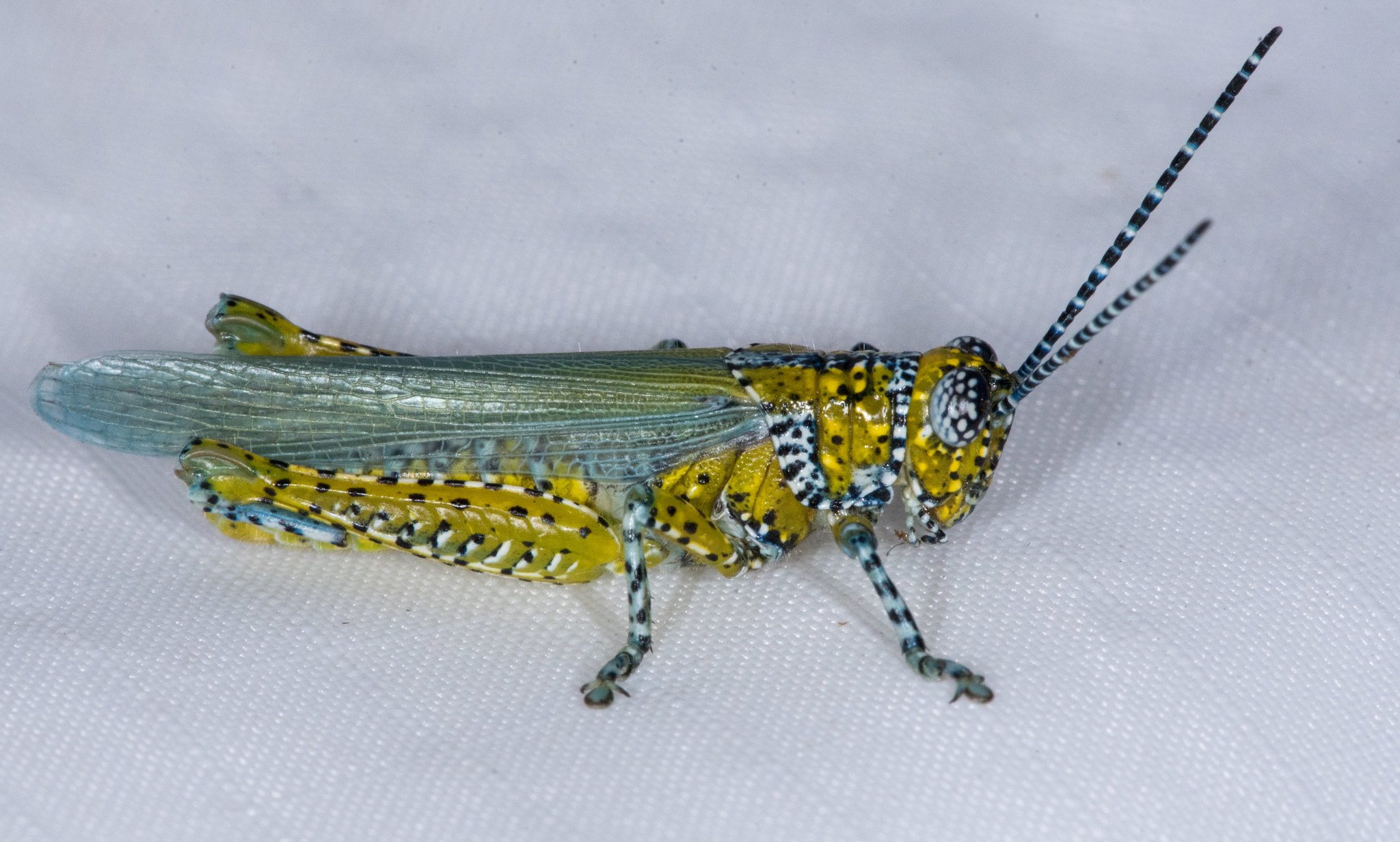
- Poecilotettix pantherinus, panther-spotted grasshopper, Arizona, USA

Scientific classification
- Domain: Eukaryota
- Kingdom: Animalia
- Phylum: Arthropoda
- Class: Insecta
- Order: Orthoptera
- Suborder: Caelifera
- Family: Acrididae
- Subfamily: Melanoplinae
- Tribe: Dactylotini
- Genus: Poecilotettix
- Species: P. pantherinus

Binomial name
- Poecilotettix pantherinus (Walker, F., 1870)

Synonyms
- Acridium pantherinus Walker, 1870

= Poecilotettix pantherinus =

Species of spur-throated grasshopper

Poecilotettix pantherinus, the panther-spotted grasshopper, is a species of spur-throated grasshopper in the family Acrididae. It is found in Mexico and the southwestern United States.
