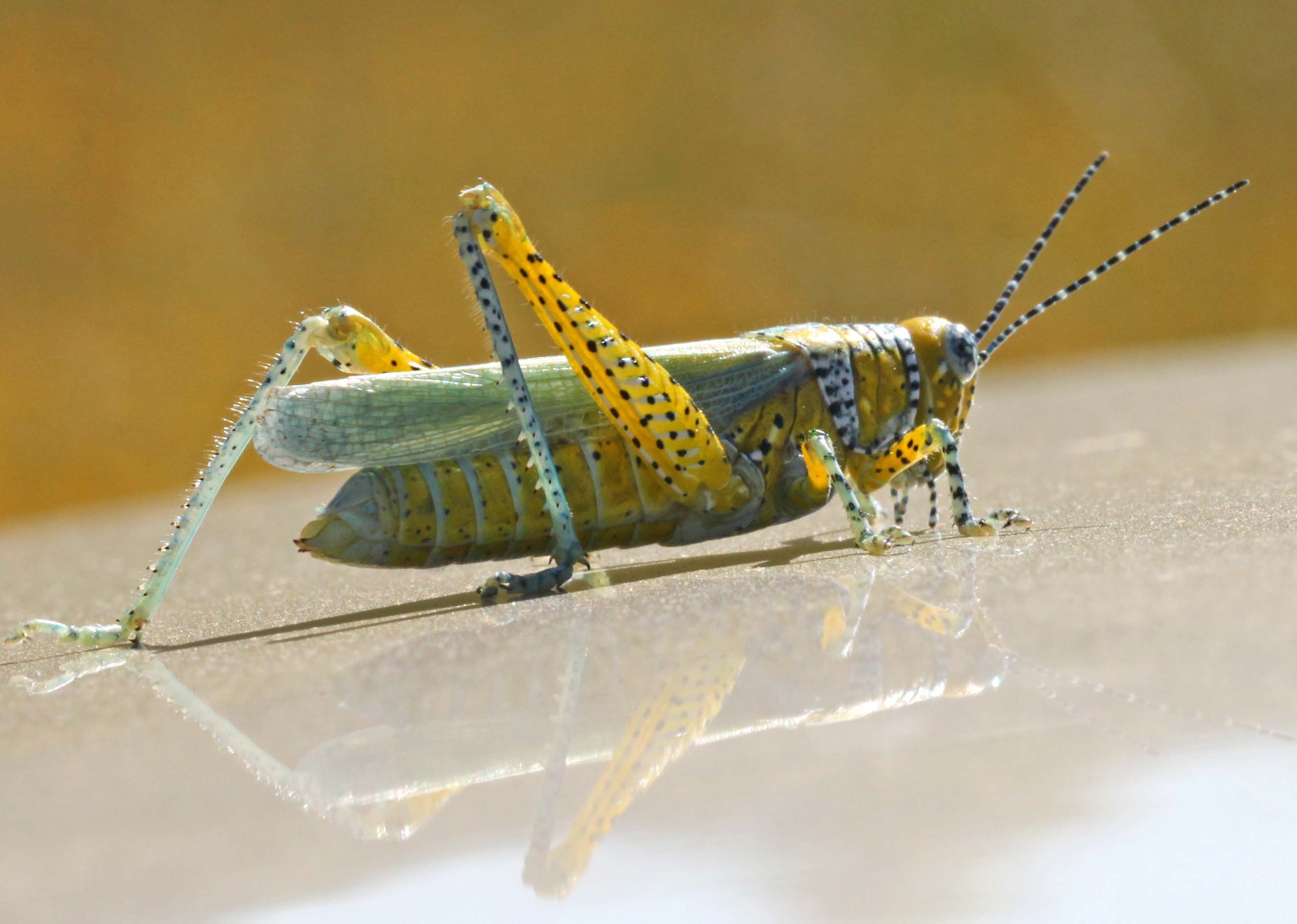
- Poecilotettix pantherinus

Scientific classification
- Domain: Eukaryota
- Kingdom: Animalia
- Phylum: Arthropoda
- Class: Insecta
- Order: Orthoptera
- Suborder: Caelifera
- Family: Acrididae
- Subfamily: Melanoplinae
- Tribe: Dactylotini
- Genus: Poecilotettix; Scudder, 1897

= Poecilotettix =

Genus of grasshoppers

Poecilotettix is a genus of spur-throated grasshoppers in the family Acrididae and the tribe Dactylotini. There two known described species in Poecilotettix.

== Species ==
These two species belong to the genus Poecilotettix:

- Poecilotettix pantherinus (Walker, F., 1870)^{c g b} (panther-spotted grasshopper)
- Poecilotettix sanguineus Scudder, 1897^{i c g b} (red-lined grasshopper)

Data sources: i = ITIS, c = Catalogue of Life, g = GBIF, b = Bugguide.net
