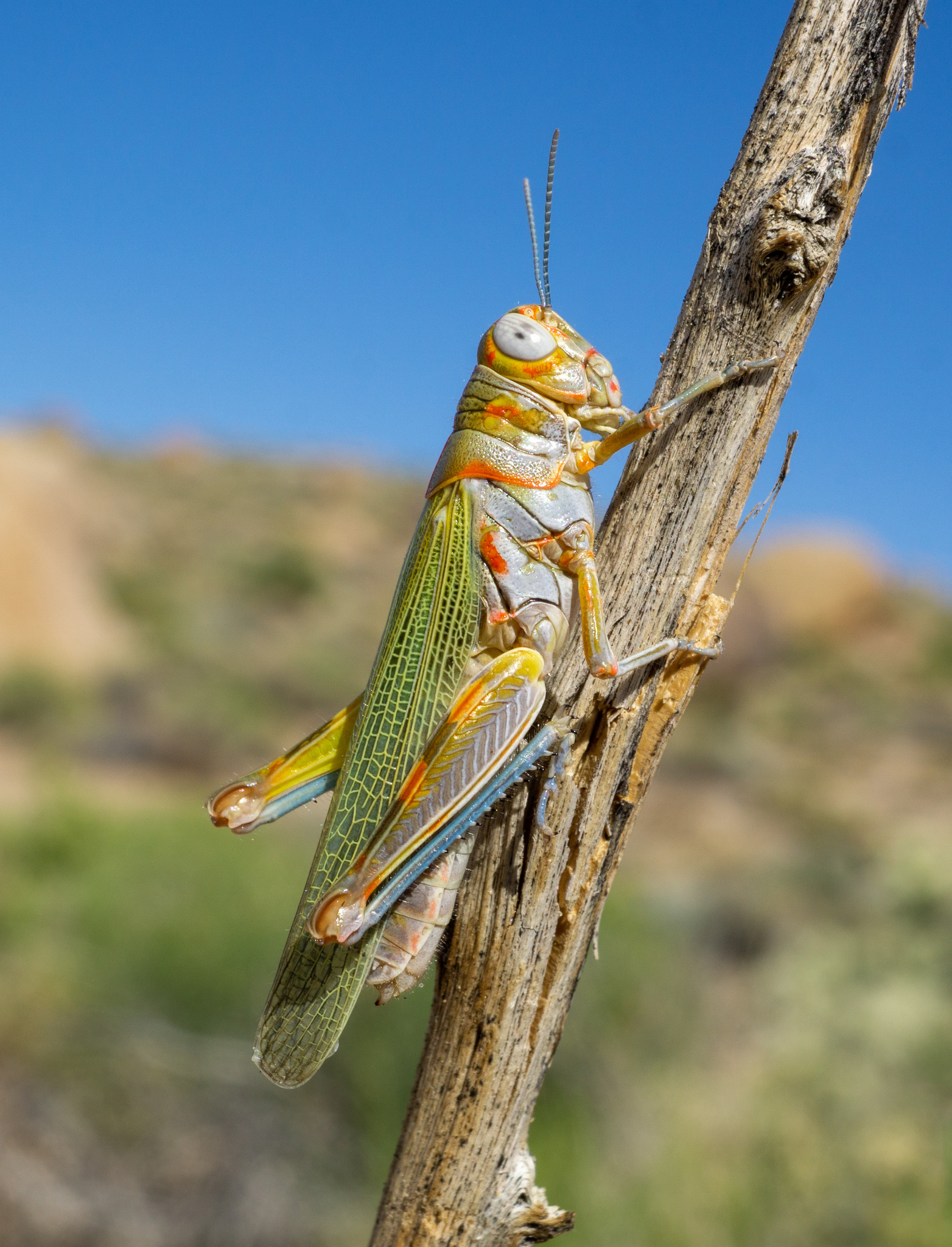

Scientific classification
- Domain: Eukaryota
- Kingdom: Animalia
- Phylum: Arthropoda
- Class: Insecta
- Order: Orthoptera
- Suborder: Caelifera
- Family: Acrididae
- Tribe: Dactylotini
- Genus: Poecilotettix
- Species: P. sanguineus

Binomial name
- Poecilotettix sanguineus Scudder, 1897

= Poecilotettix sanguineus =

Red-lined grasshopper

Poecilotettix sanguineus, the red-lined grasshopper, is a species of spur-throated grasshopper in the family Acrididae. It is found in North America.
