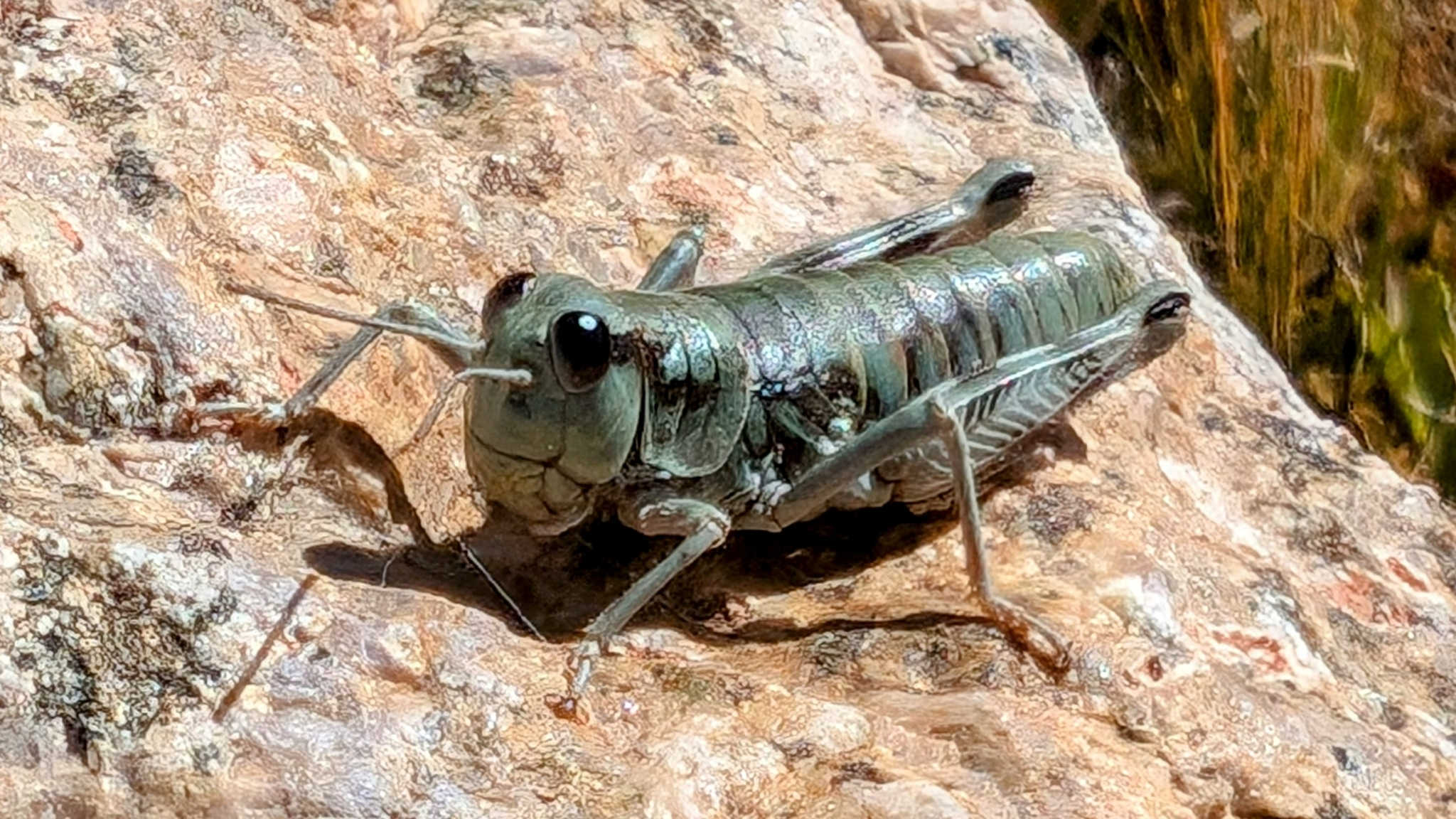

Scientific classification
- Kingdom: Animalia
- Phylum: Arthropoda
- Clade: Pancrustacea
- Class: Insecta
- Order: Orthoptera
- Suborder: Caelifera
- Family: Acrididae
- Tribe: Podismini
- Genus: Hebardacris
- Species: H. albida

Binomial name
- Hebardacris albida (Hebard, 1920)

= Hebardacris albida =

Species of grasshopper

Hebardacris albida, the Mount Whitney grasshopper, is a species of spur-throated grasshopper in the family Acrididae. It is found in North America.
