= Hebardacris excelsa =

Scientific classification
- Kingdom: Animalia
- Phylum: Arthropoda
- Clade: Pancrustacea
- Class: Insecta
- Order: Orthoptera
- Suborder: Caelifera
- Family: Acrididae
- Tribe: Podismini
- Genus: Hebardacris
- Species: H. excelsa

Binomial name
- Hebardacris excelsa (Rehn, 1907)

Species of grasshopper

Hebardacris excelsa is a species of spur-throated grasshopper in the family Acrididae. It is found in North America.
