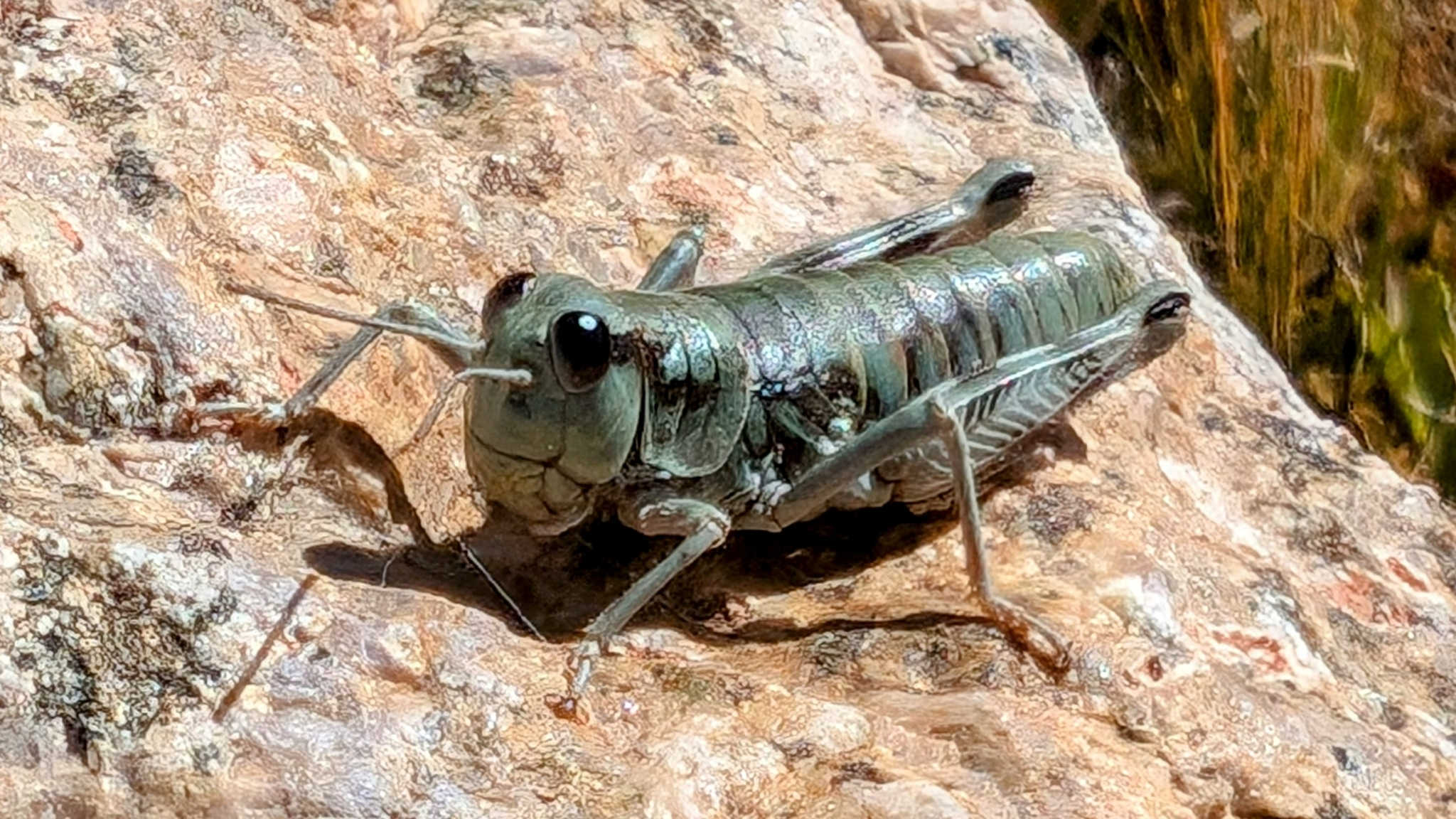
- Hebardacris albida

Scientific classification
- Kingdom: Animalia
- Phylum: Arthropoda
- Clade: Pancrustacea
- Class: Insecta
- Order: Orthoptera
- Suborder: Caelifera
- Family: Acrididae
- Subfamily: Melanoplinae
- Tribe: Podismini
- Genus: Hebardacris; Rehn, 1952

= Hebardacris =

Genus of grasshoppers

Hebardacris is a genus of spur-throated grasshoppers in the family Acrididae. There are at least three described species in Hebardacris.

== Species ==
These three species belong to the genus Hebardacris:

- Hebardacris albida (Hebard, 1920)^{i c g b} (Mount Whitney grasshopper)
- Hebardacris excelsa (Rehn, 1907)^{i c g b}
- Hebardacris mono Rehn, 1964^{i c g b}

Data sources: i = ITIS, c = Catalogue of Life, g = GBIF, b = Bugguide.net
