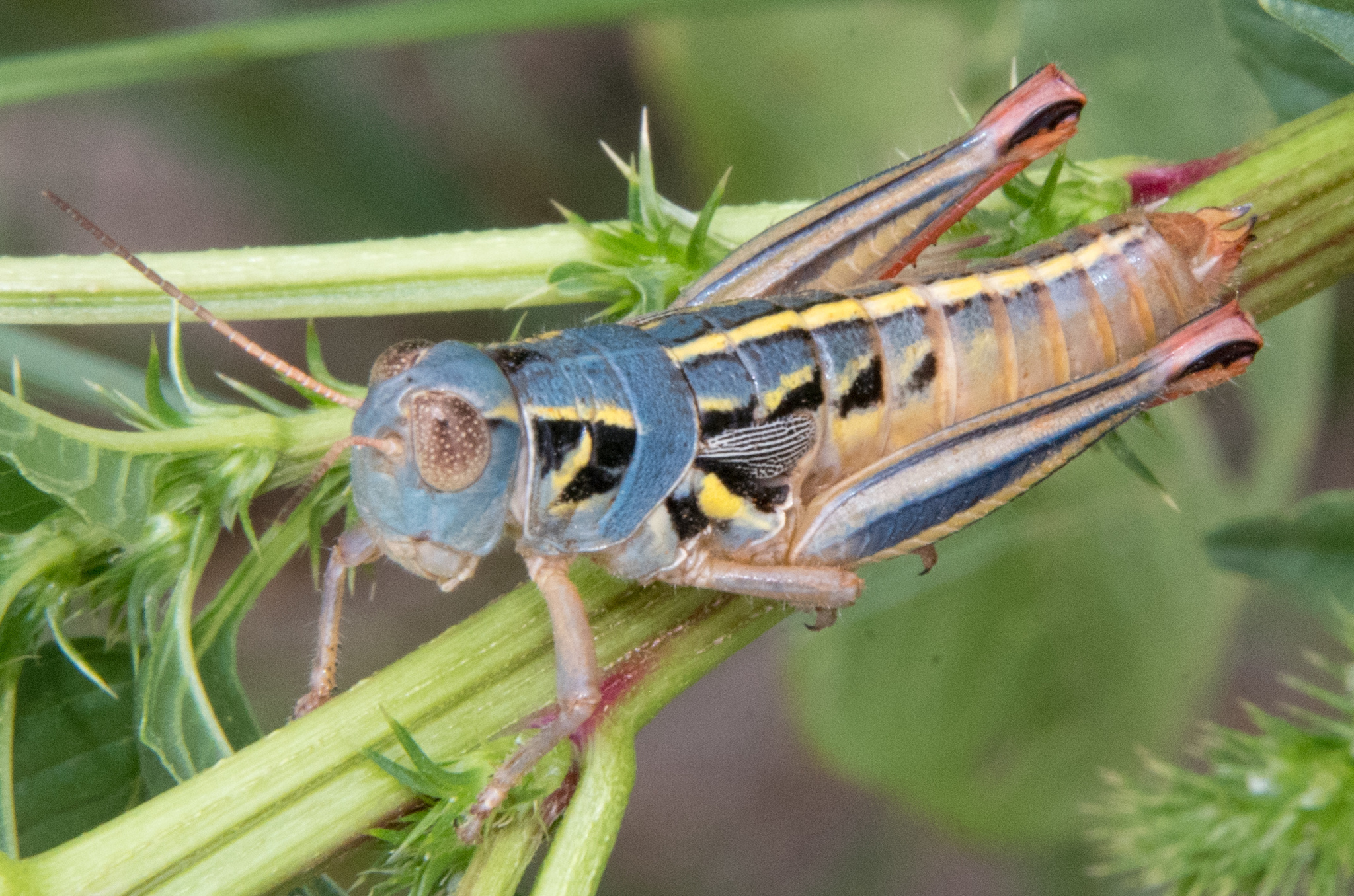
- Barytettix humphreysii, Humphrey's grasshopper, Arizona, USA

Scientific classification
- Domain: Eukaryota
- Kingdom: Animalia
- Phylum: Arthropoda
- Class: Insecta
- Order: Orthoptera
- Suborder: Caelifera
- Family: Acrididae
- Subfamily: Melanoplinae
- Tribe: Conalcaeini
- Genus: Barytettix
- Species: B. humphreysii

Binomial name
- Barytettix humphreysii (Thomas, C., 1875)

= Barytettix humphreysii =

Species of grasshopper

Barytettix humphreysii, or Humphrey's grasshopper, is a species of spur-throated grasshopper in the family Acrididae. It is found in the southwestern United States and northwestern Mexico.

== Subspecies ==
These subspecies belong to the species Barytettix humphreysii:

- Barytettix humphreysii cochisei Gurney, 1951
- Barytettix humphreysii humphreysii (Thomas, C., 1875)
