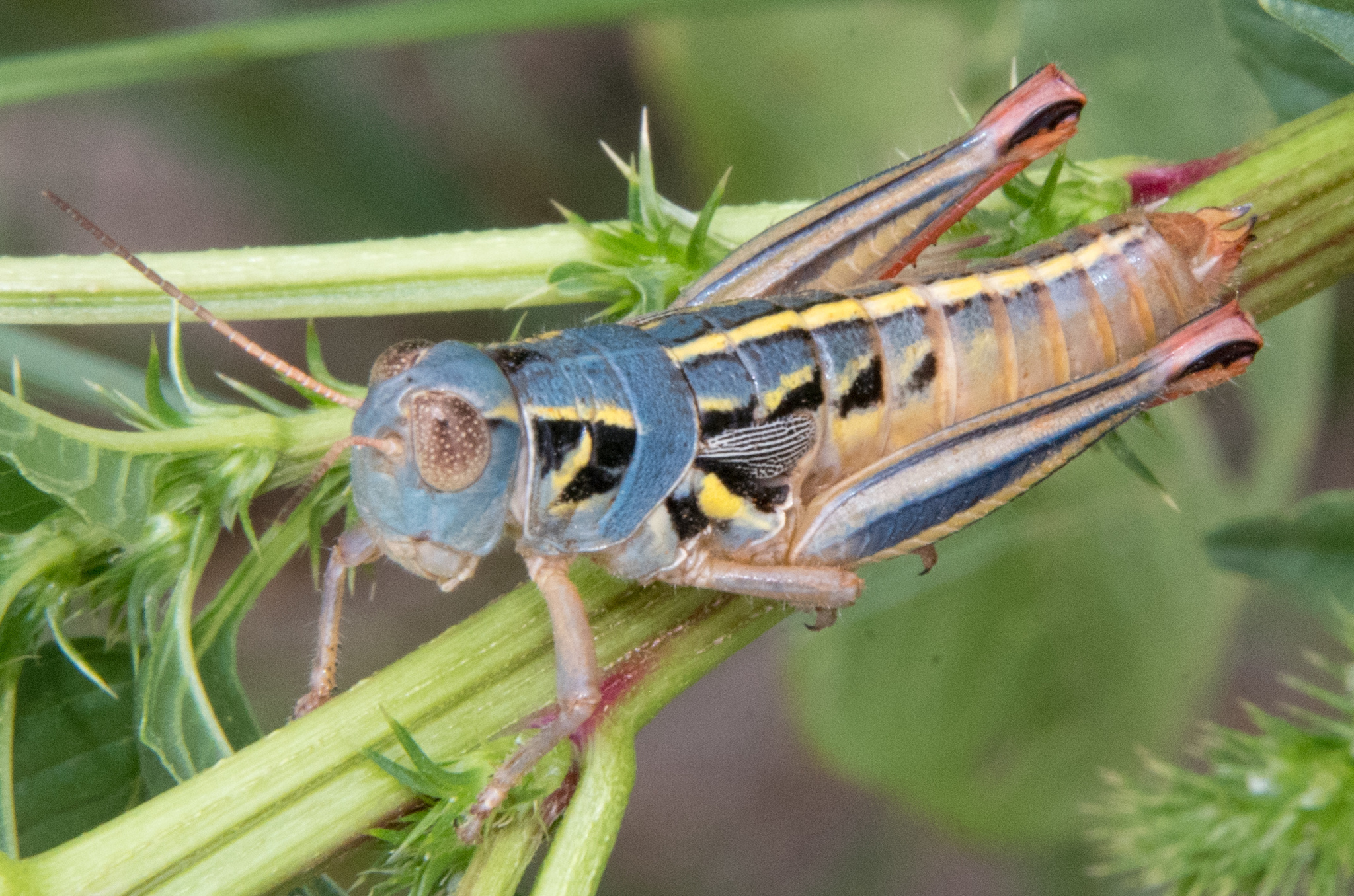
- Barytettix humphreysii, Humphrey's grasshopper

Scientific classification
- Domain: Eukaryota
- Kingdom: Animalia
- Phylum: Arthropoda
- Class: Insecta
- Order: Orthoptera
- Suborder: Caelifera
- Family: Acrididae
- Subfamily: Melanoplinae
- Tribe: Conalcaeini
- Genus: Barytettix; Scudder, 1897

= Barytettix =

Genus of grasshoppers

Barytettix is a genus of spur-throated grasshoppers in the family Acrididae. There are about nine described species in Barytettix, found in western Mexico and the southwestern United States.

== Species ==
These species belong to the genus Barytettix:

- Barytettix contilus Cohn & Cantrall, 1974
- Barytettix crassus Scudder, 1897
- Barytettix humphreysii (Thomas, C., 1875) (Humphrey's grasshopper)
- Barytettix nigrofasciatus Cohn & Cantrall, 1974
- Barytettix paloviridis Cohn & Cantrall, 1974
- Barytettix poecila (Hebard, 1925)
- Barytettix psolus Cohn & Cantrall, 1974
- Barytettix terminalis Cohn & Cantrall, 1974
- Barytettix tridens Cohn & Cantrall, 1974
