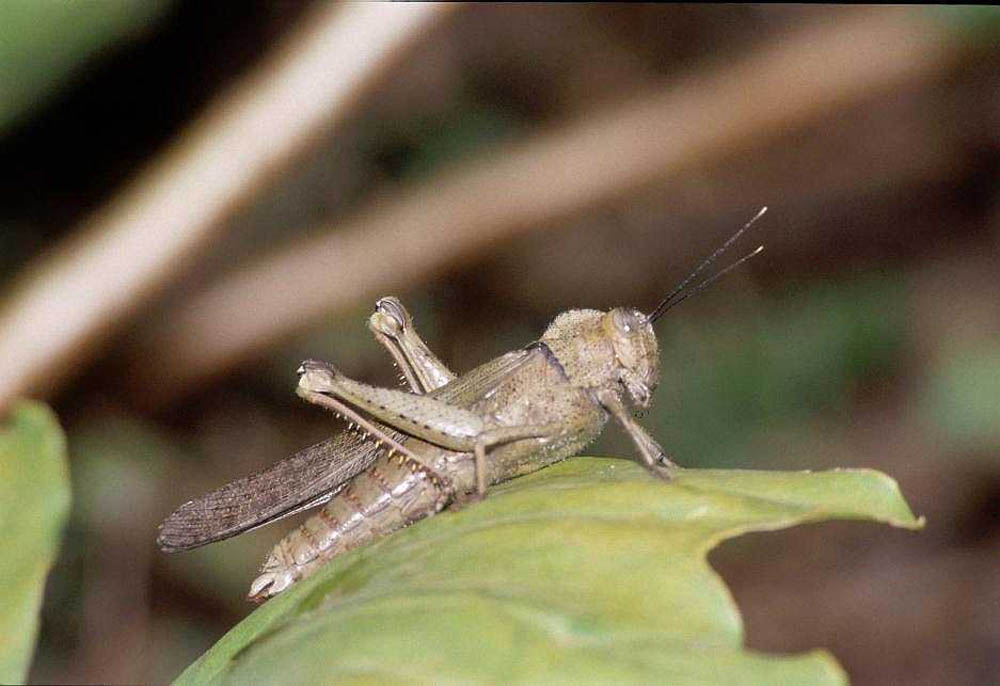

Scientific classification
- Kingdom: Animalia
- Phylum: Arthropoda
- Class: Insecta
- Order: Orthoptera
- Suborder: Caelifera
- Family: Acrididae
- Subfamily: Catantopinae
- Genus: Abisares
- Species: A. viridipennis

Binomial name
- Abisares viridipennis (Burmeister, 1838)

= Abisares viridipennis =

Species of grasshopper

Abisares viridipennis is a species of short-horned grasshopper in the family Acrididae, found in the Afrotropics.

== Subspecies ==
These subspecies belong to the species Abisares viridipennis:

- Abisares viridipennis dromedarius (Rehn, 1914)
- Abisares viridipennis hylaeus (Rehn, 1914)
- Abisares viridipennis viridipennis (Burmeister, 1838)
