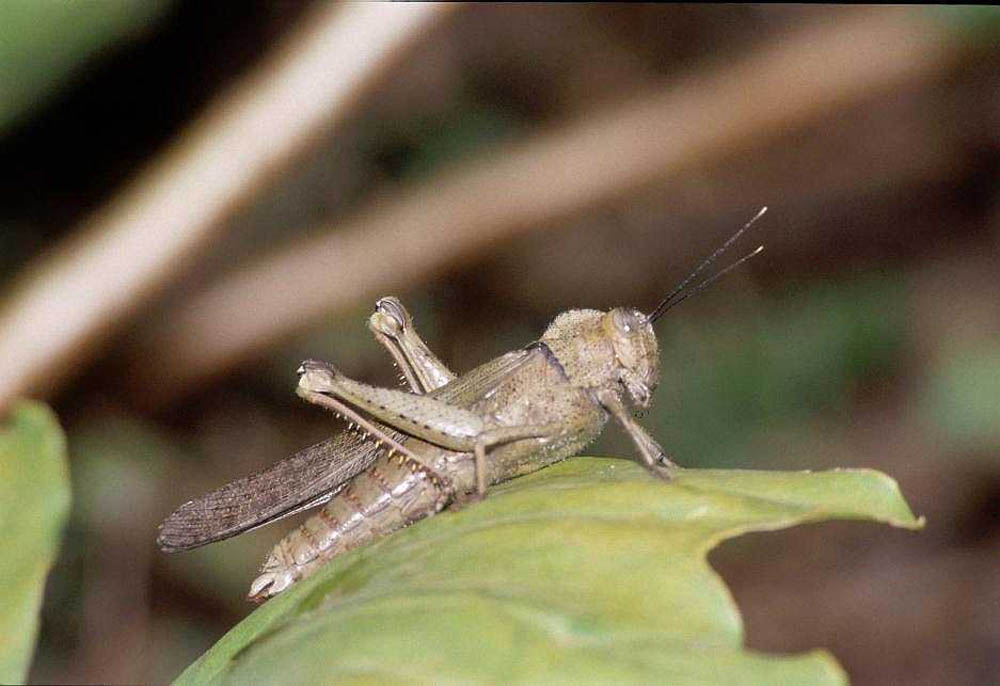
- Abisares viridipennis, notched shield grasshopper, Kenya

Scientific classification
- Kingdom: Animalia
- Phylum: Arthropoda
- Clade: Pancrustacea
- Class: Insecta
- Order: Orthoptera
- Suborder: Caelifera
- Family: Acrididae
- Subfamily: Catantopinae
- Genus: Abisares; Stål, 1878

= Abisares (grasshopper) =

Genus of grasshoppers

Abisares is a genus of spur-throated grasshoppers in the family Acrididae. There are at least two described species in Abisares, both found in Africa.

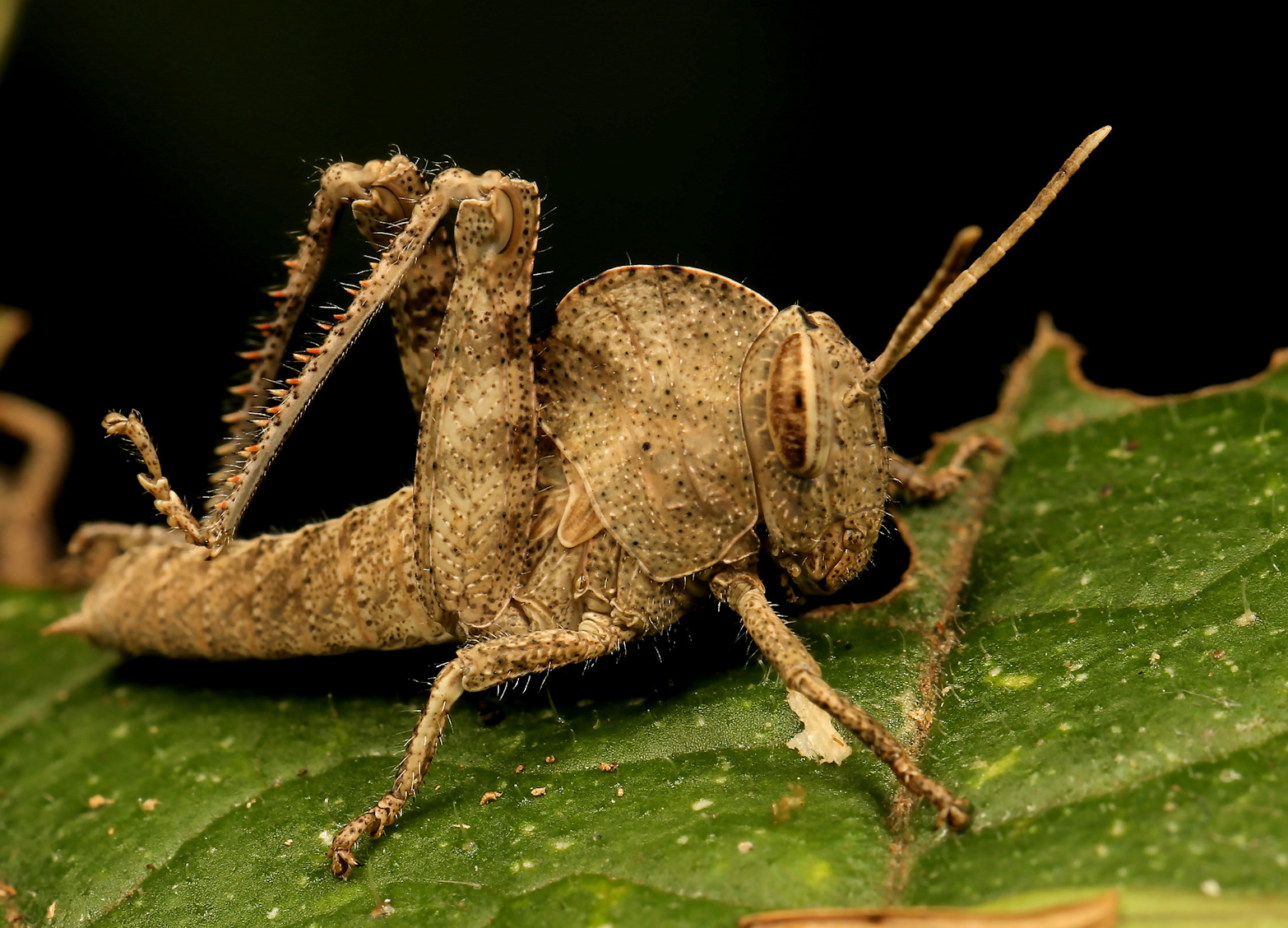
Abisares viridipennis, notched shield grasshopper, South Africa

== Species ==
These two species belong to the genus Abisares:

- Abisares depressus Uvarov, 1938
- Abisares viridipennis (Burmeister, 1838) (notched shield grasshopper)
