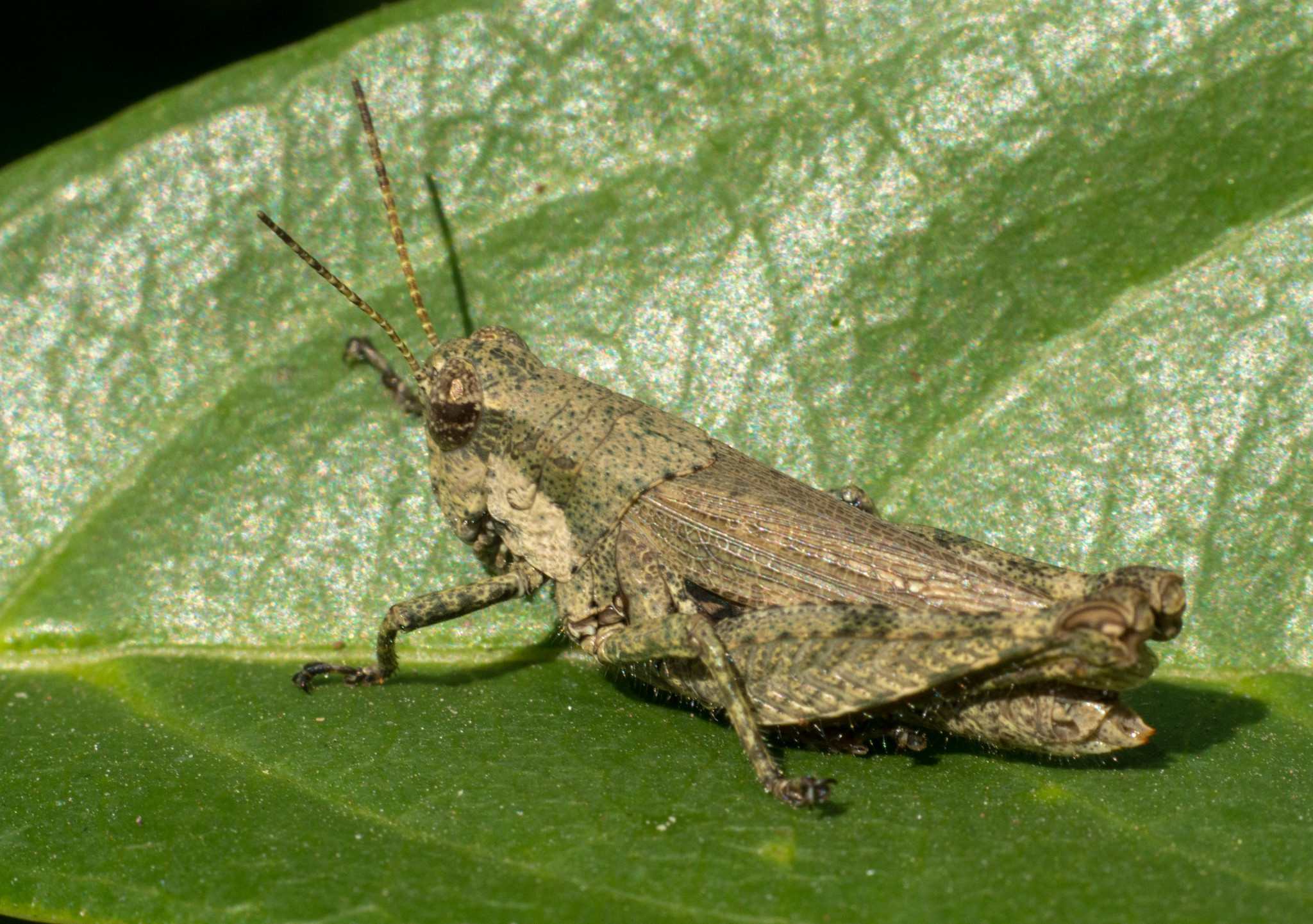
- Ronderosia bergii, Argentina

Scientific classification
- Kingdom: Animalia
- Phylum: Arthropoda
- Clade: Pancrustacea
- Class: Insecta
- Order: Orthoptera
- Suborder: Caelifera
- Family: Acrididae
- Subfamily: Melanoplinae
- Tribe: Dichroplini
- Genus: Ronderosia
- Species: R. bergii

Binomial name
- Ronderosia bergii (Stål, 1878)

= Ronderosia bergii =

Species of spur-throated grasshopper

Ronderosia bergii is a species of spur-throated grasshopper in the family Acrididae. It is found in South America.
