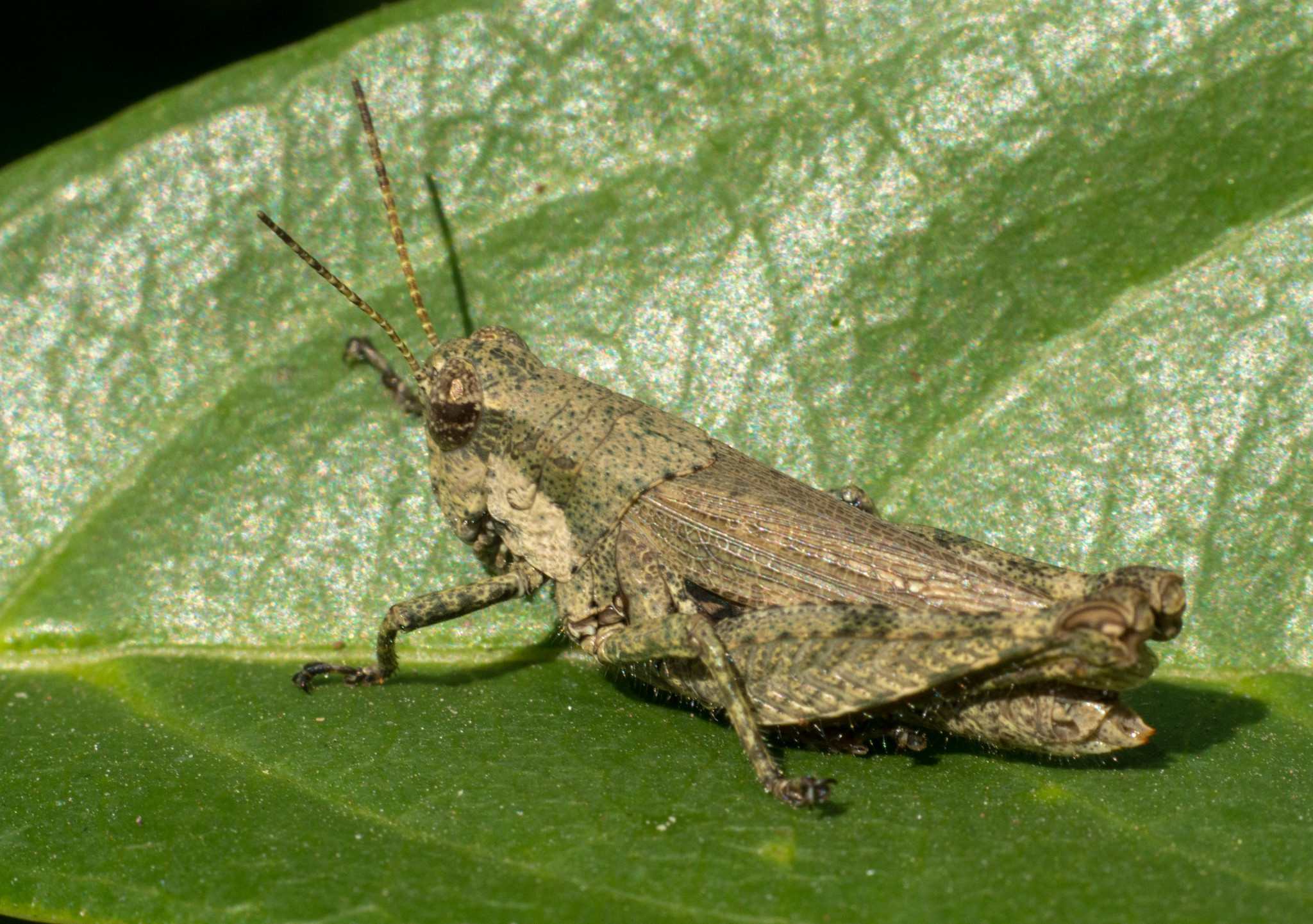
- Ronderosia bergii, Argentina

Scientific classification
- Domain: Eukaryota
- Kingdom: Animalia
- Phylum: Arthropoda
- Class: Insecta
- Order: Orthoptera
- Suborder: Caelifera
- Family: Acrididae
- Subfamily: Melanoplinae
- Tribe: Dichroplini
- Genus: Ronderosia; Cigliano, 1997

= Ronderosia =

Genus of insects

Ronderosia is a genus of spur-throated grasshoppers in the family Acrididae. There are about 10 described species in Ronderosia, found in South America.

== Species ==
These species belong to the genus Ronderosia:

- Ronderosia bergii (Stål, 1878)
- Ronderosia cinctipes (Bruner, 1906)
- Ronderosia dubia (Bruner, 1906)
- Ronderosia forcipata (Rehn, 1918)
- Ronderosia gracilis (Bruner, 1911)
- Ronderosia malloi (Liebermann, 1966)
- Ronderosia ommexechoides Carbonell & Mesa, 2006
- Ronderosia paraguayensis (Bruner, 1906)
- Ronderosia piceomaculata (Carbonell, 1972)
- Ronderosia robusta (Bruner, 1906)
