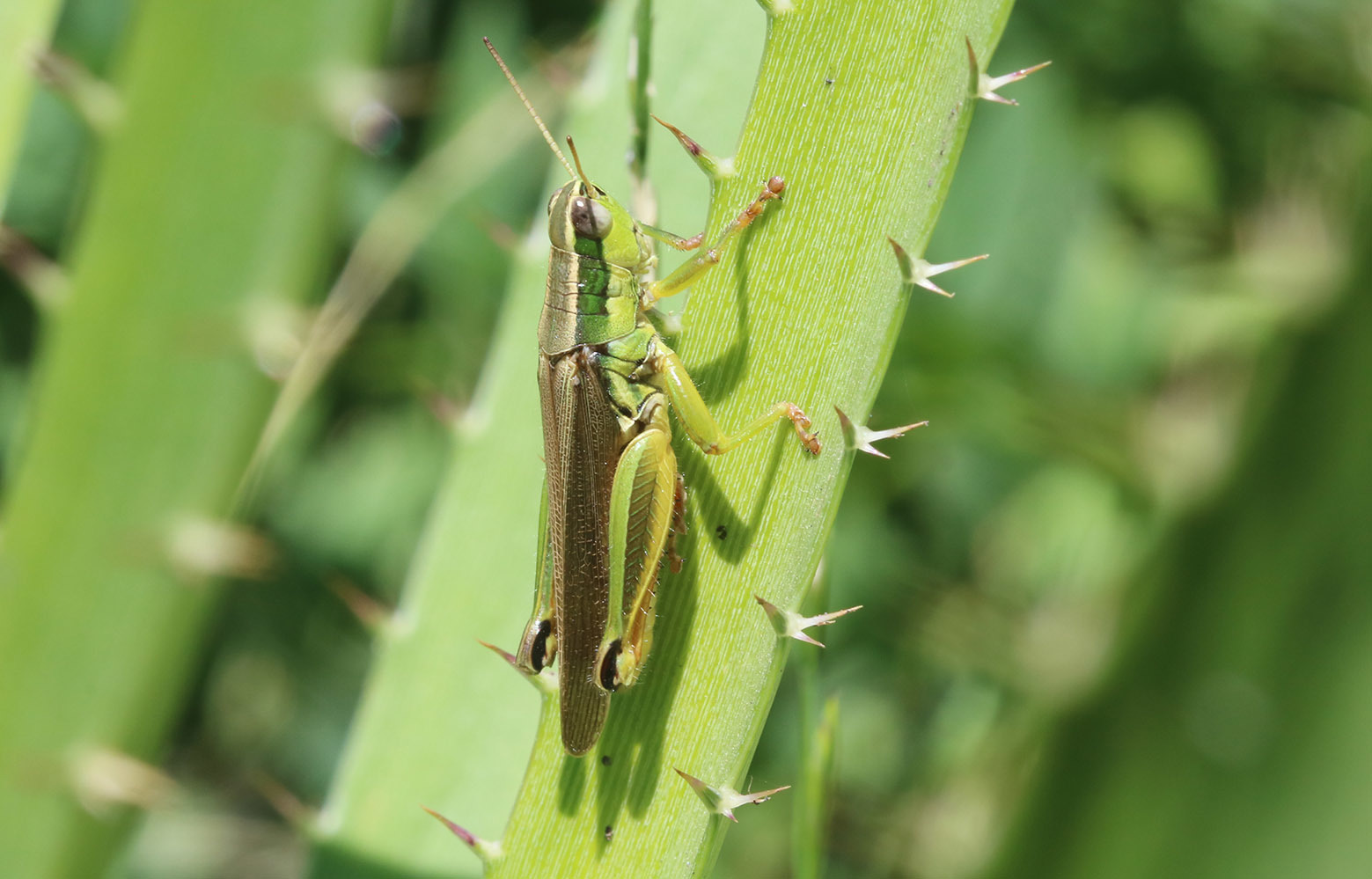
- Scotussa cliens, Argentina

Scientific classification
- Domain: Eukaryota
- Kingdom: Animalia
- Phylum: Arthropoda
- Class: Insecta
- Order: Orthoptera
- Suborder: Caelifera
- Family: Acrididae
- Subfamily: Melanoplinae
- Tribe: Dichroplini
- Genus: Scotussa; Giglio-Tos, 1894

= Scotussa (grasshopper) =

Genus of insects

Scotussa is a genus of spur-throated grasshoppers in the family Acrididae. There are about seven described species in Scotussa, found in South America.

== Species ==
These species belong to the genus Scotussa:

- Scotussa brachyptera Cigliano & Ronderos, 1994
- Scotussa cliens (Stål, 1861)
- Scotussa daguerrei Liebermann, 1947
- Scotussa delicatula Liebermann, 1947
- Scotussa impudica Giglio-Tos, 1894
- Scotussa lemniscata (Stål, 1861)
- Scotussa liebermanni Mesa & Zolessi, 1968
