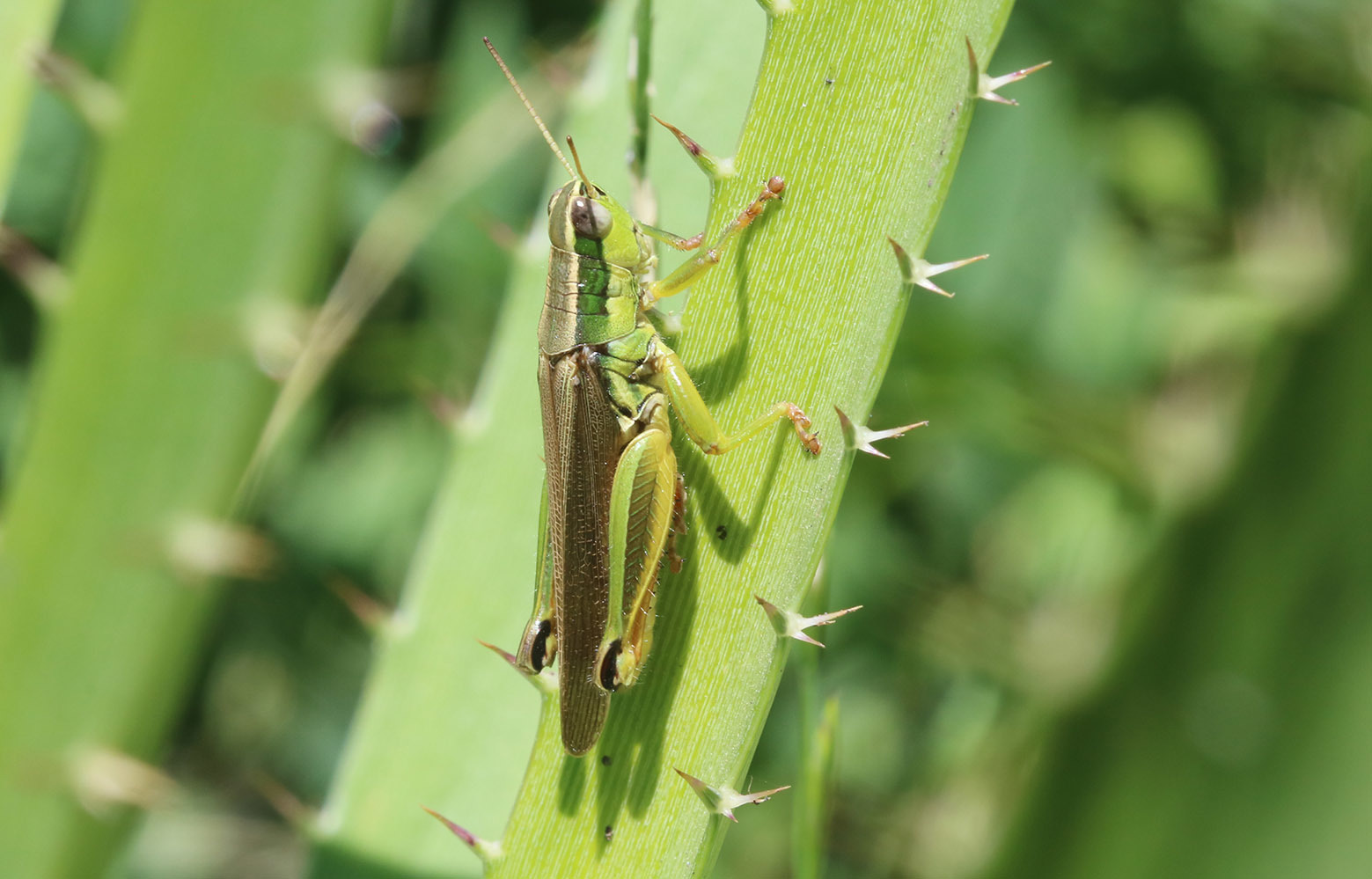
- Scotussa cliens, Argentina

Scientific classification
- Kingdom: Animalia
- Phylum: Arthropoda
- Clade: Pancrustacea
- Class: Insecta
- Order: Orthoptera
- Suborder: Caelifera
- Family: Acrididae
- Subfamily: Melanoplinae
- Tribe: Dichroplini
- Genus: Scotussa
- Species: S. cliens

Binomial name
- Scotussa cliens (Stål, 1861)

= Scotussa cliens =

Species of spur-throated grasshopper

Scotussa cliens is a species of spur-throated grasshopper in the family Acrididae. It is found in South America.
