= Anconia hebardi =

Scientific classification
- Domain: Eukaryota
- Kingdom: Animalia
- Phylum: Arthropoda
- Class: Insecta
- Order: Orthoptera
- Suborder: Caelifera
- Family: Acrididae
- Tribe: Anconiini
- Genus: Anconia
- Species: A. hebardi

Binomial name
- Anconia hebardi Rehn, 1919

Species of grasshopper

Anconia hebardi, or Hebard's blue-winged desert grasshopper, is a species of band-winged grasshopper in the family Acrididae. It is found in Central America and North America.
