= Anconia =

Scientific classification
- Domain: Eukaryota
- Kingdom: Animalia
- Phylum: Arthropoda
- Class: Insecta
- Order: Orthoptera
- Suborder: Caelifera
- Family: Acrididae
- Subfamily: Oedipodinae
- Tribe: Anconiini; Hebard, 1937
- Genus: Anconia; Scudder, 1876

Genus of grasshoppers

Anconia is a genus of band-winged grasshoppers in the family Acrididae. There are at least two described species in Anconia.

== Species ==
These two species belong to the genus Anconia:

- Anconia hebardi Rehn, 1919 (Hebard's blue-winged desert grasshopper)
- Anconia integra Scudder, 1876 (alkali grasshopper)
