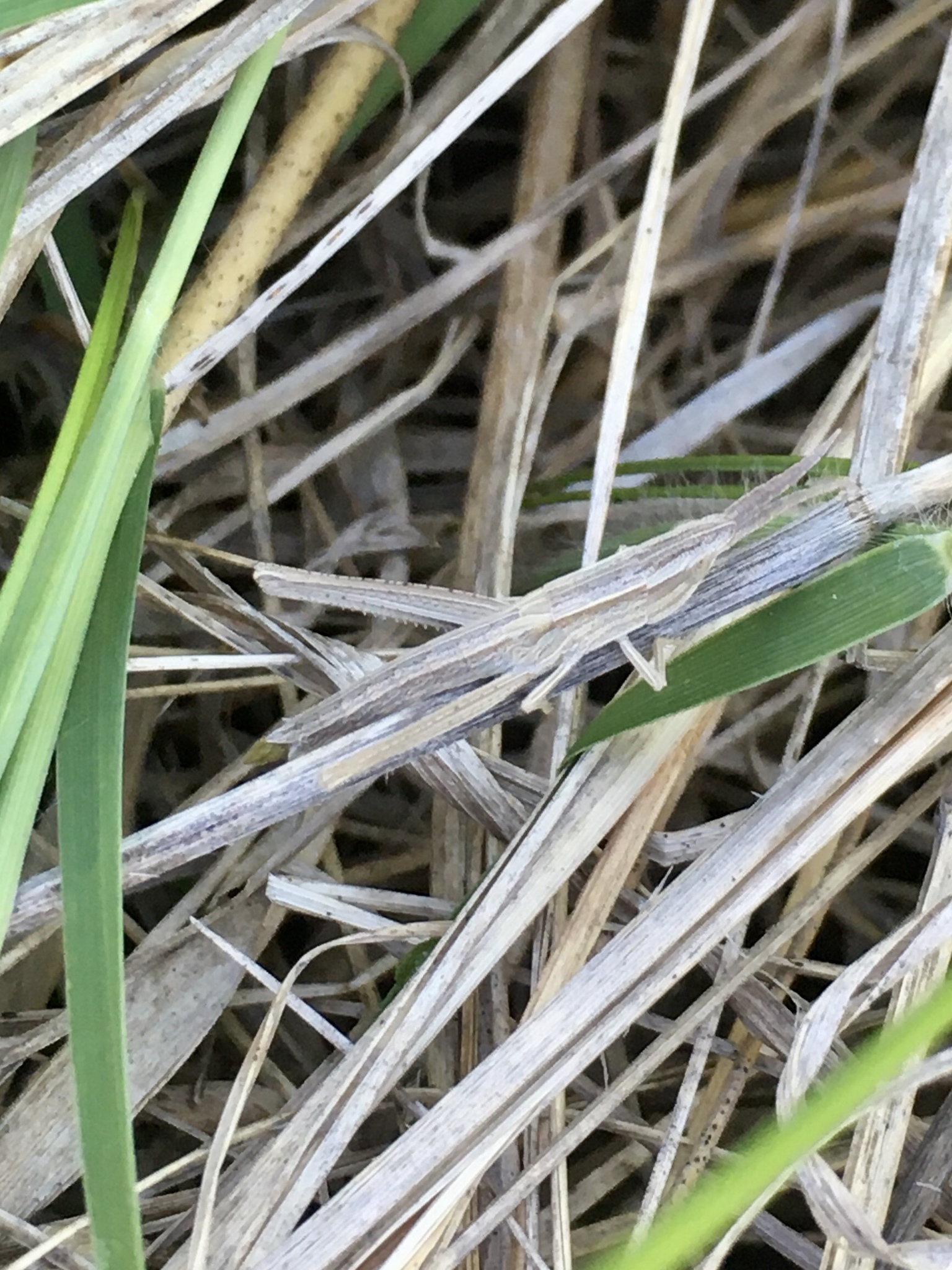
- Pseudopomala brachyptera, short-winged toothpick grasshopper, Minnesota, USA

Scientific classification
- Domain: Eukaryota
- Kingdom: Animalia
- Phylum: Arthropoda
- Class: Insecta
- Order: Orthoptera
- Suborder: Caelifera
- Family: Acrididae
- Subfamily: Gomphocerinae
- Tribe: Mermiriini
- Genus: Pseudopomala
- Species: P. brachyptera

Binomial name
- Pseudopomala brachyptera (Scudder, 1863)

= Pseudopomala brachyptera =

Species of slant-faced grasshopper

Pseudopomala brachyptera, known generally as short-winged toothpick grasshopper, is a species of slant-faced grasshopper in the family Acrididae. Other common names include the bunch grass locust and bunchgrass grasshopper. It is found in North America.
