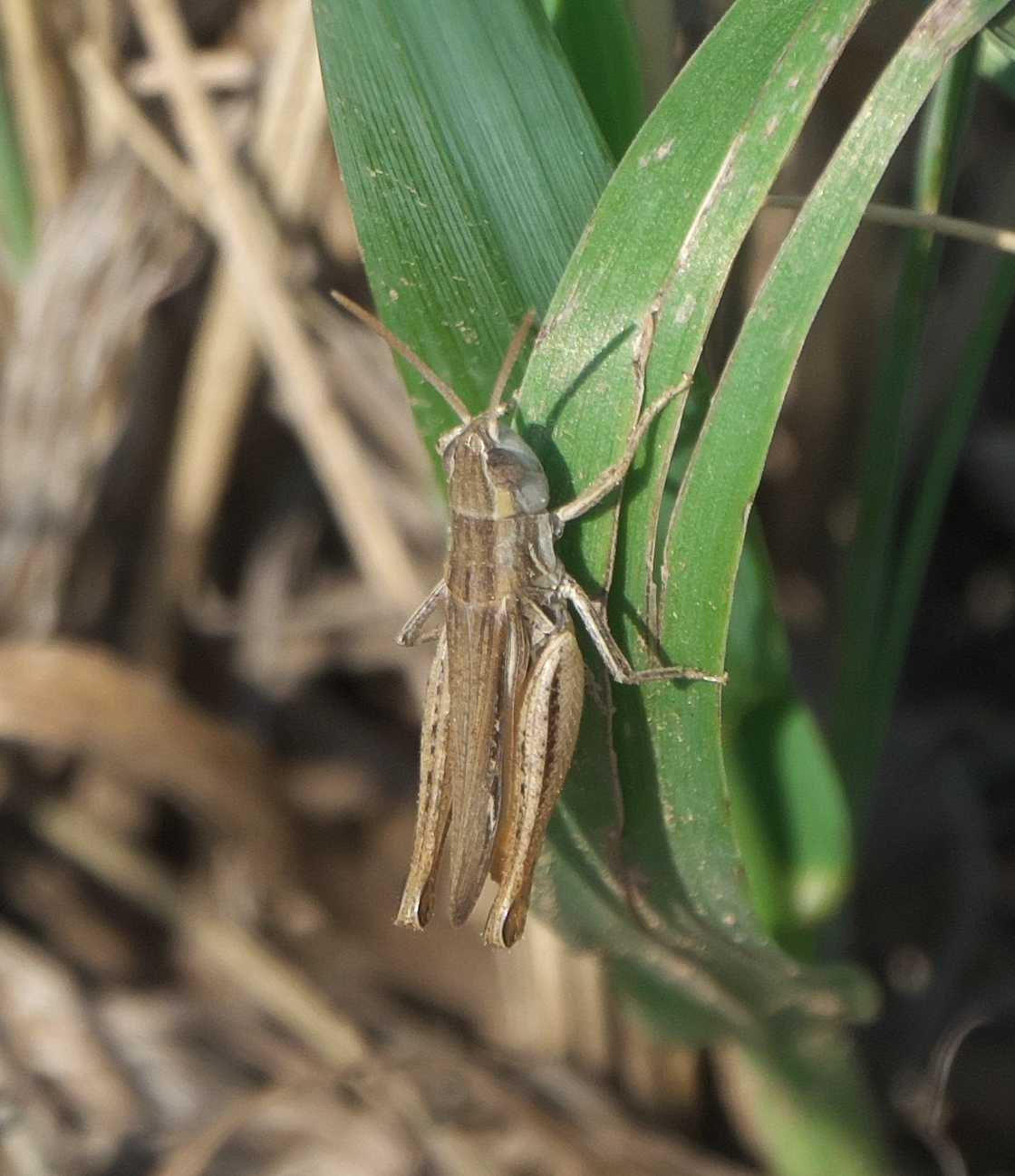
- Eritettix simplex, New Mexico

Scientific classification
- Domain: Eukaryota
- Kingdom: Animalia
- Phylum: Arthropoda
- Class: Insecta
- Order: Orthoptera
- Suborder: Caelifera
- Family: Acrididae
- Tribe: Eritettigini
- Genus: Eritettix
- Species: E. simplex

Binomial name
- Eritettix simplex (Scudder, 1869)

= Eritettix simplex =

Species of grasshopper

Eritettix simplex, known generally as the velvet-striped grasshopper or velvet-striped locust, is a species of slant-faced grasshopper in the family Acrididae. It is found in Central America and North America.
