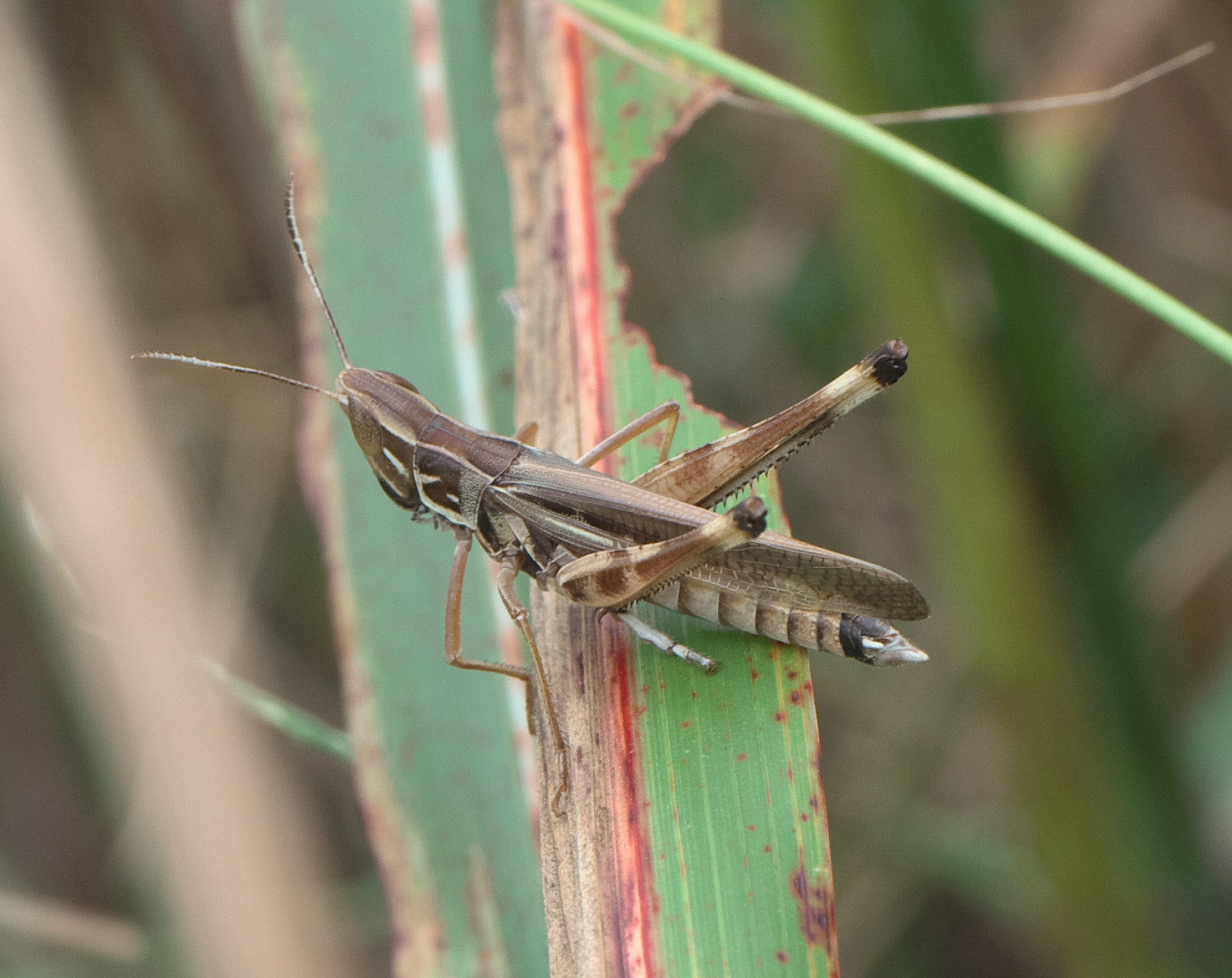

Scientific classification
- Domain: Eukaryota
- Kingdom: Animalia
- Phylum: Arthropoda
- Class: Insecta
- Order: Orthoptera
- Suborder: Caelifera
- Family: Acrididae
- Subfamily: Gomphocerinae
- Genus: Syrbula
- Species: S. admirabilis

Binomial name
- Syrbula admirabilis (Uhler, 1864)

= Syrbula admirabilis =

Species of grasshopper

Syrbula admirabilis, known generally as admirable grasshopper, is a species of slant-faced grasshopper in the family Acrididae. Other common names include the handsome grasshopper and handsome locust. It is found in Central America and North America.

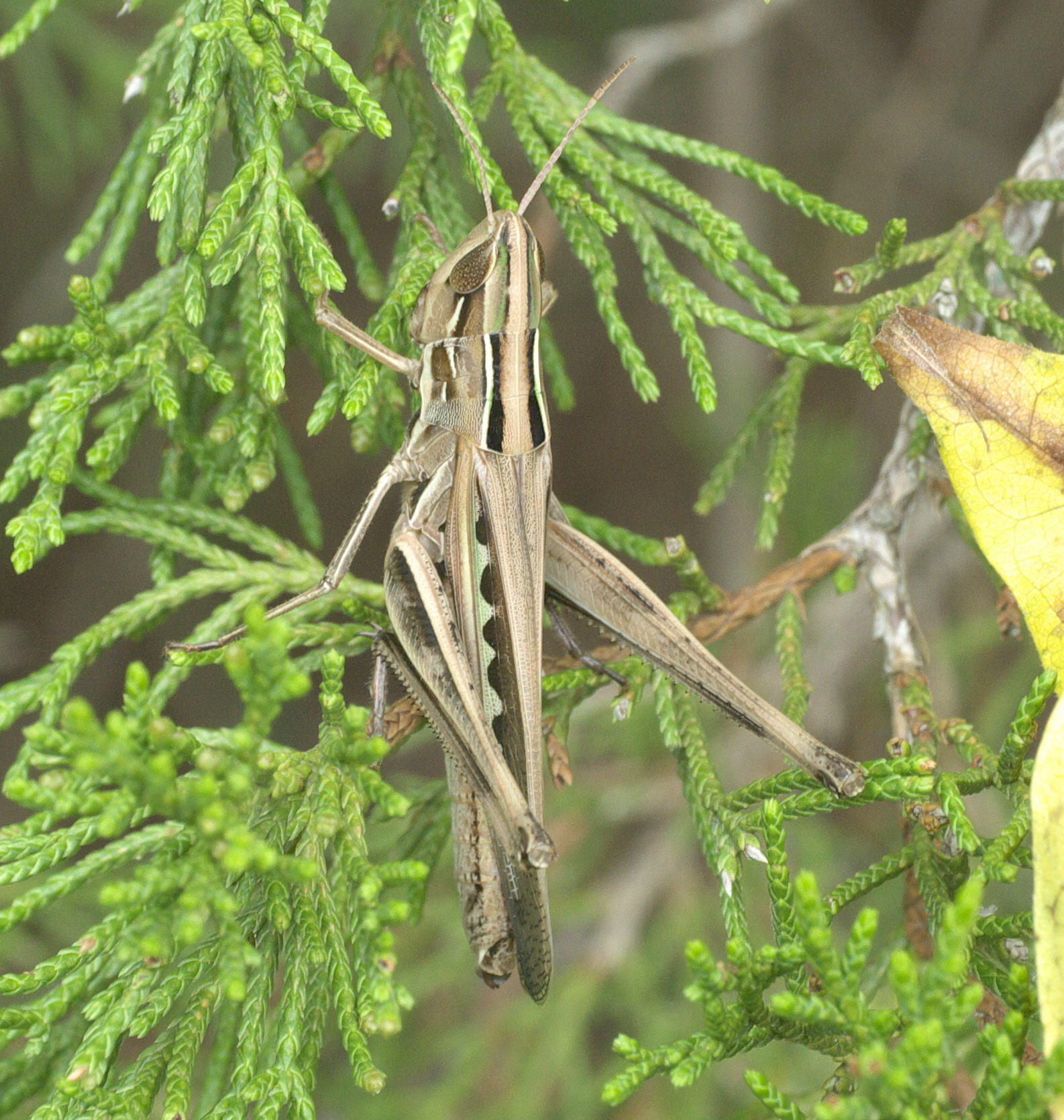
Admirable grasshopper, Syrbula admirabilis

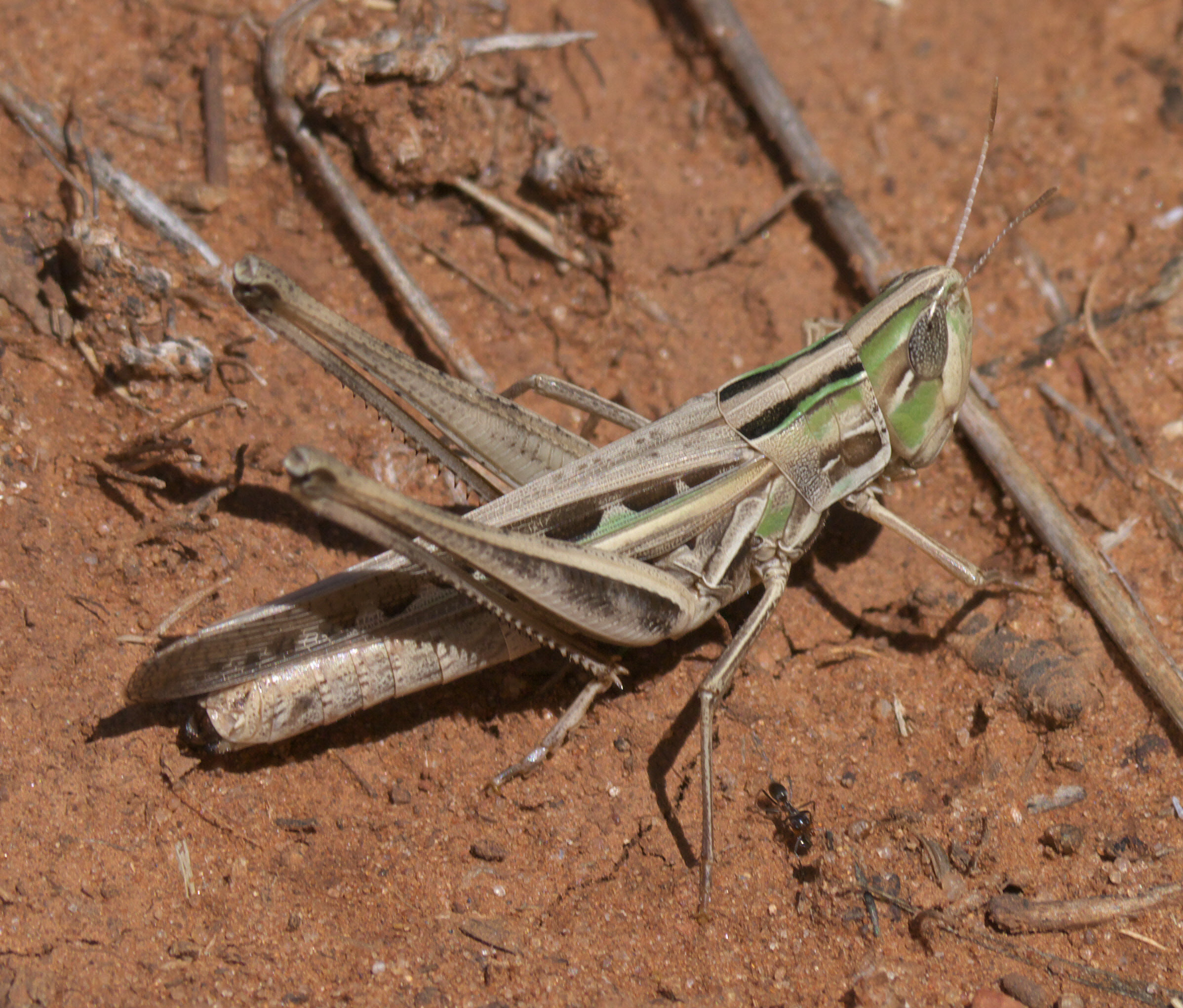
Admirable grasshopper, Syrbula admirabilis
