= Alota =

Alota may refer to:

- Alota Canton, a town and surrounding district in Bolivia
- Alota (grasshopper), a genus of insects
