= Ageneotettix brevipennis =

Scientific classification
- Domain: Eukaryota
- Kingdom: Animalia
- Phylum: Arthropoda
- Class: Insecta
- Order: Orthoptera
- Suborder: Caelifera
- Family: Acrididae
- Subfamily: Gomphocerinae
- Genus: Ageneotettix
- Species: A. brevipennis

Binomial name
- Ageneotettix brevipennis (Bruner, 1904)

Species of grasshopper

Ageneotettix brevipennis, the short-wing big-headed grasshopper, is a species of slant-faced grasshopper in the family Acrididae. It is found in Central America, North America, and Mexico.
