= Leva =

Leva may refer to:

- Bulgarian lev, Bulgarian currency
- Leva (grasshopper), a genus of insects
- Levice, a town in Slovakia
