= Eupnigodes sierranus =

Scientific classification
- Kingdom: Animalia
- Phylum: Arthropoda
- Class: Insecta
- Order: Orthoptera
- Suborder: Caelifera
- Family: Acrididae
- Subfamily: Gomphocerinae
- Genus: Eupnigodes
- Species: E. sierranus

Binomial name
- Eupnigodes sierranus (Rehn & Hebard, 1909)

Species of grasshopper

Eupnigodes sierranus, the sierran white-whiskered grasshopper, is a species of slant-faced grasshopper belonging to the family Acrididae. It is found in the western United States.
