= Eupnigodes megocephala =

Scientific classification
- Domain: Eukaryota
- Kingdom: Animalia
- Phylum: Arthropoda
- Class: Insecta
- Order: Orthoptera
- Suborder: Caelifera
- Family: Acrididae
- Subfamily: Gomphocerinae
- Genus: Eupnigodes
- Species: E. megocephala

Binomial name
- Eupnigodes megocephala (McNeill, 1897)

Species of grasshopper

Eupnigodes megocephala, the big-headed grasshopper, is a species of slant-faced grasshopper in the family Acrididae. It is found in the western United States
