= Horesidotes cinereus =

Scientific classification
- Domain: Eukaryota
- Kingdom: Animalia
- Phylum: Arthropoda
- Class: Insecta
- Order: Orthoptera
- Suborder: Caelifera
- Family: Acrididae
- Subfamily: Gomphocerinae
- Genus: Horesidotes
- Species: H. cinereus

Binomial name
- Horesidotes cinereus Scudder, 1899

Species of grasshopper

Horesidotes cinereus, the ash-gray range grasshopper, is a species of slant-faced grasshopper in the family Acrididae. It is found in Central America and North America.

== Subspecies ==
These two subspecies belong to the species Horesidotes cinereus:

- Horesidotes cinereus cinereus Scudder, 1899
- Horesidotes cinereus saltator Hebard, 1931
