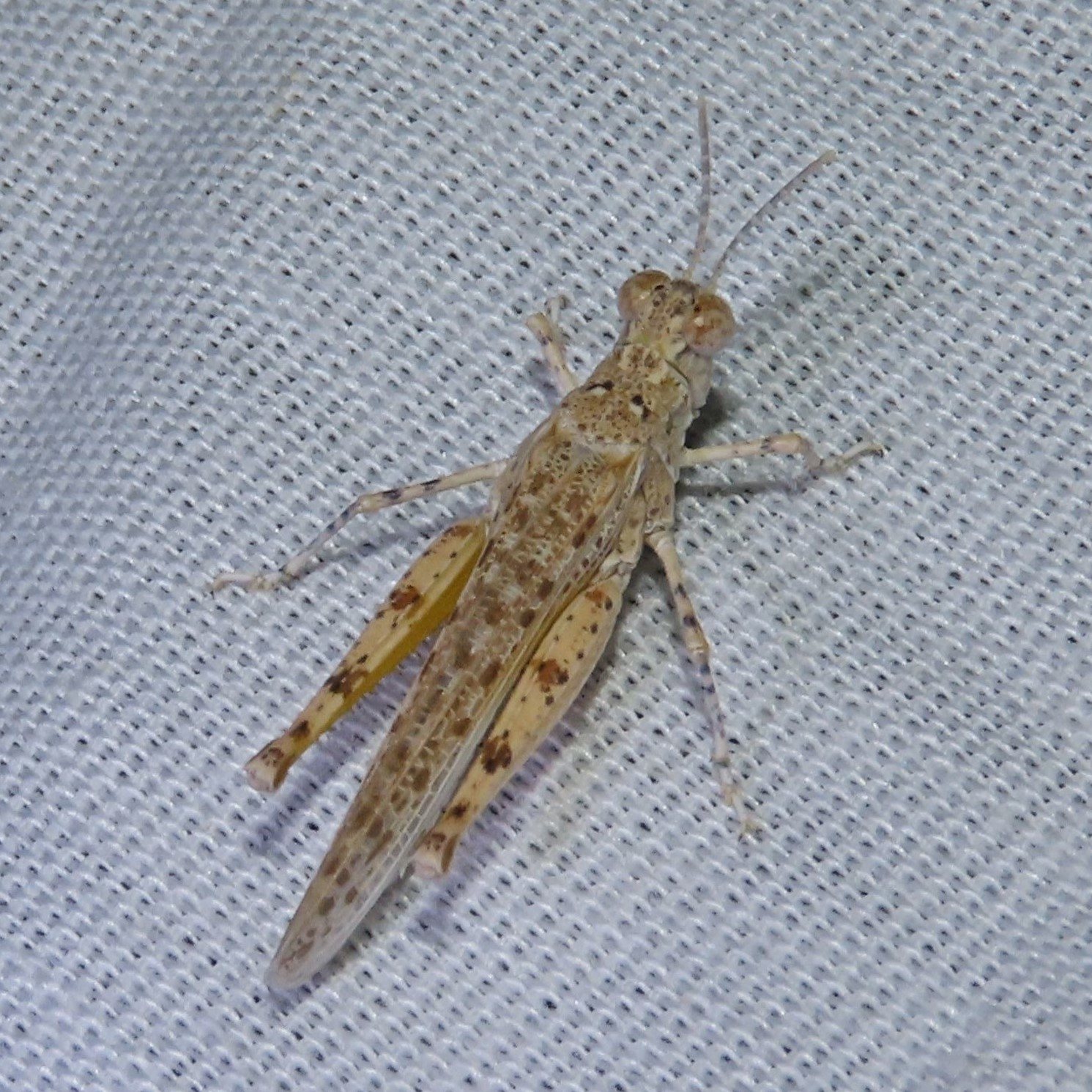

Scientific classification
- Domain: Eukaryota
- Kingdom: Animalia
- Phylum: Arthropoda
- Class: Insecta
- Order: Orthoptera
- Suborder: Caelifera
- Family: Acrididae
- Subfamily: Gomphocerinae
- Genus: Xeracris
- Species: X. snowi

Binomial name
- Xeracris snowi (Caudell, 1915)

= Xeracris snowi =

Species of grasshopper

Xeracris snowi, commonly known as Snow's desert grasshopper, is a species of slant-faced grasshopper in the family Acrididae. It is found in Central America and North America.
