= Ageneotettix salutator =

Scientific classification
- Kingdom: Animalia
- Phylum: Arthropoda
- Class: Insecta
- Order: Orthoptera
- Suborder: Caelifera
- Family: Acrididae
- Subfamily: Gomphocerinae
- Genus: Ageneotettix
- Species: A. salutator

Binomial name
- Ageneotettix salutator (Rehn, 1927)

Species of grasshopper

Ageneotettix salutator is a species of slant-faced grasshopper in the family Acrididae. It is found in Central America and North America.
