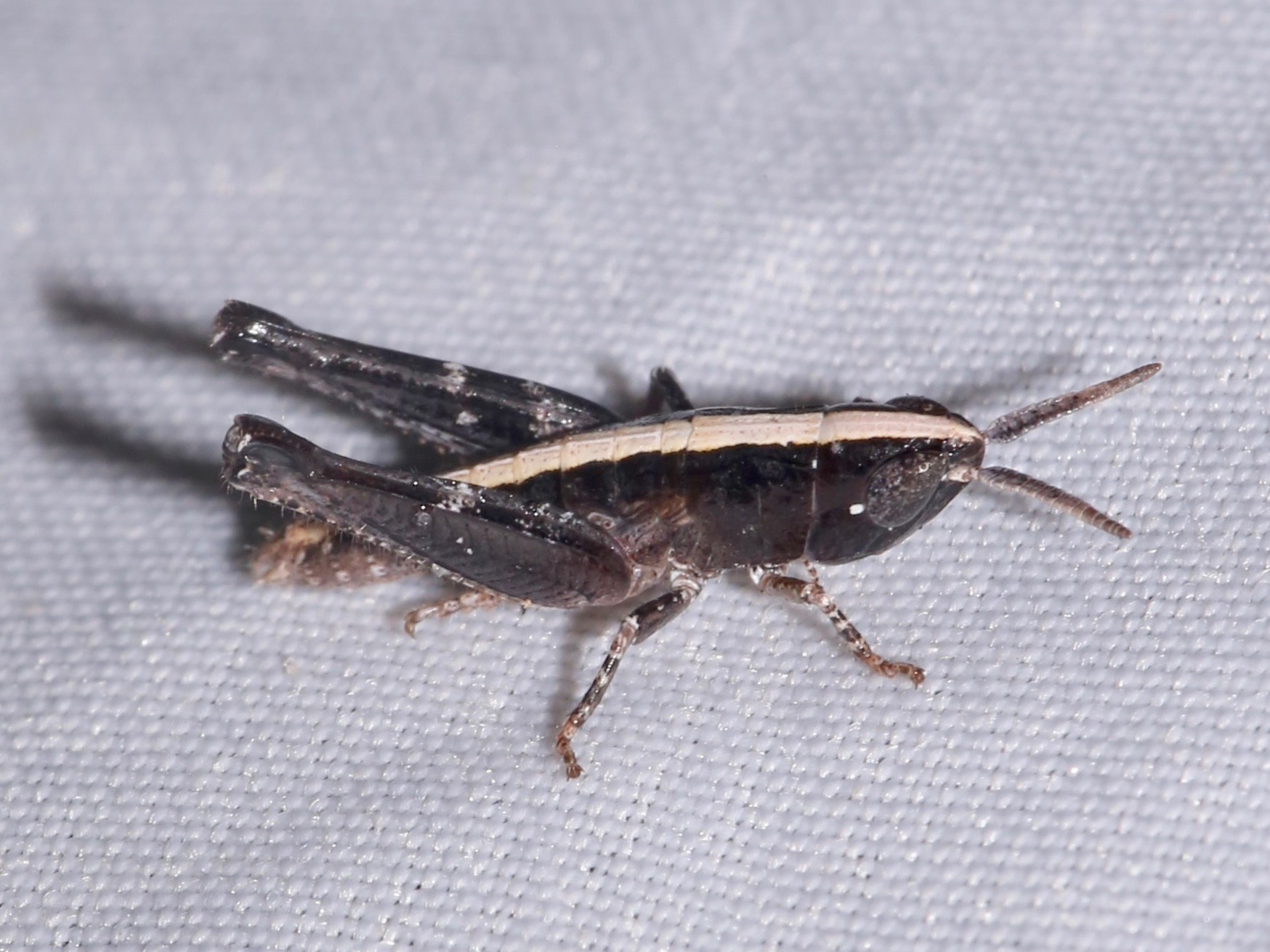

Scientific classification
- Domain: Eukaryota
- Kingdom: Animalia
- Phylum: Arthropoda
- Class: Insecta
- Order: Orthoptera
- Suborder: Caelifera
- Family: Acrididae
- Tribe: Eritettigini
- Genus: Eritettix
- Species: E. obscurus

Binomial name
- Eritettix obscurus (Scudder, 1878)

= Eritettix obscurus =

Species of grasshopper

Eritettix obscurus, commonly known as the obscure grasshopper or obscure slant-faced grasshopper, is a species of slant-faced grasshopper in the family Acrididae. It is found in North America.
