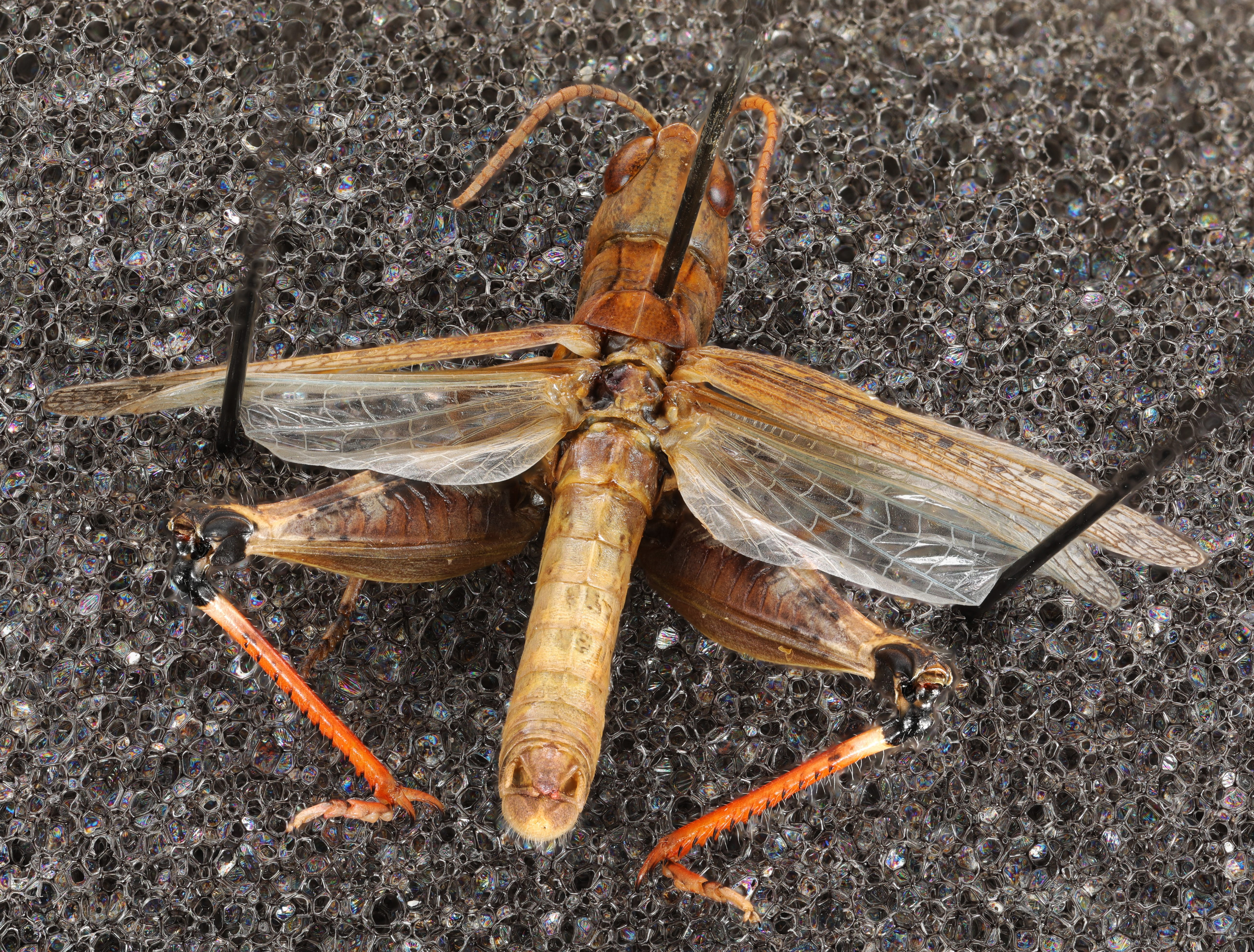

Scientific classification
- Domain: Eukaryota
- Kingdom: Animalia
- Phylum: Arthropoda
- Class: Insecta
- Order: Orthoptera
- Suborder: Caelifera
- Family: Acrididae
- Subfamily: Gomphocerinae
- Genus: Ageneotettix
- Species: A. deorum

Binomial name
- Ageneotettix deorum (Scudder, 1876)

= Ageneotettix deorum =

Species of grasshopper

Ageneotettix deorum, known generally as the white-whiskered grasshopper or white whiskers grasshopper, is a species of slant-faced grasshopper in the family Acrididae. It is found in Central America and North America.
