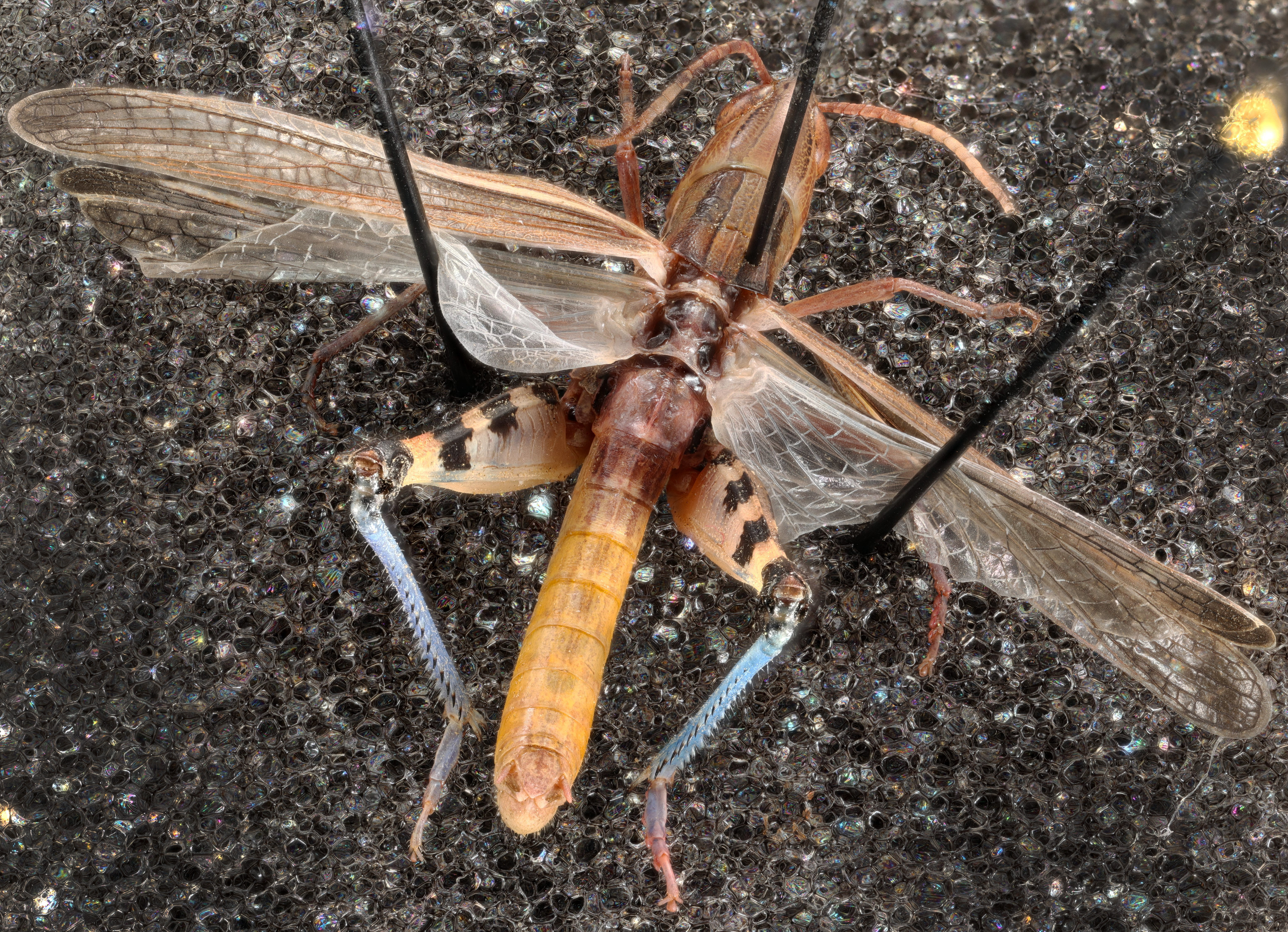

Scientific classification
- Domain: Eukaryota
- Kingdom: Animalia
- Phylum: Arthropoda
- Class: Insecta
- Order: Orthoptera
- Suborder: Caelifera
- Family: Acrididae
- Tribe: Eritettigini
- Genus: Amphitornus
- Species: A. coloradus

Binomial name
- Amphitornus coloradus (Thomas, 1873)

= Amphitornus coloradus =

Species of grasshopper

Amphitornus coloradus, known generally as the striped slant-face grasshopper or striped grasshopper, is a species of slant-faced grasshopper in the family Acrididae. It is found in Central America and North America.

== Subspecies ==
These three subspecies belong to the species Amphitornus coloradus:

- Amphitornus coloradus coloradus (Thomas, 1873)
- Amphitornus coloradus ornatus McNeill, 1897
- Amphitornus coloradus saltator Hebard, 1937
