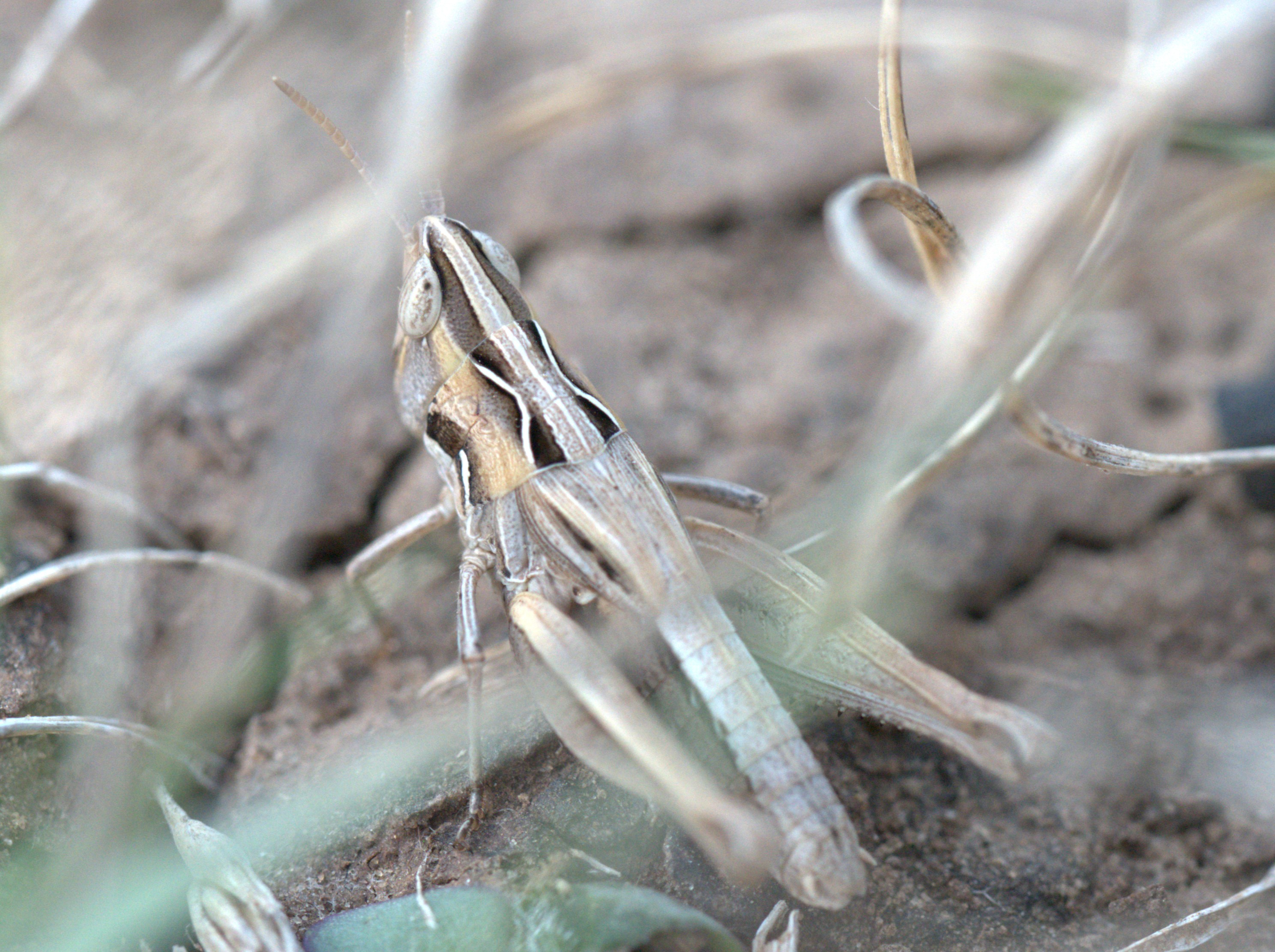

Scientific classification
- Kingdom: Animalia
- Phylum: Arthropoda
- Class: Insecta
- Order: Orthoptera
- Suborder: Caelifera
- Family: Acrididae
- Tribe: Eritettigini
- Genus: Eritettix
- Species: E. abortivus

Binomial name
- Eritettix abortivus Bruner, 1890

= Eritettix abortivus =

Species of grasshopper

Eritettix abortivus, known generally as the Texas short-winged slant-face grasshopper or Texas short-wing slantfaced grasshopper, is a species of slant-faced grasshopper in the family Acrididae. It is found in Central America and North America.
