= Amphitornus =

Scientific classification
- Domain: Eukaryota
- Kingdom: Animalia
- Phylum: Arthropoda
- Class: Insecta
- Order: Orthoptera
- Suborder: Caelifera
- Family: Acrididae
- Subfamily: Gomphocerinae
- Tribe: Eritettigini
- Genus: Amphitornus; McNeill, 1897

Genus of grasshoppers

Amphitornus is a genus of slant-faced grasshoppers in the family Acrididae. There are at least two described species in Amphitornus.

== Species ==
These two species belong to the genus Amphitornus:

- Amphitornus coloradus (Thomas, 1873) (striped slant-face grasshopper)
- Amphitornus durangus Otte, 1979
