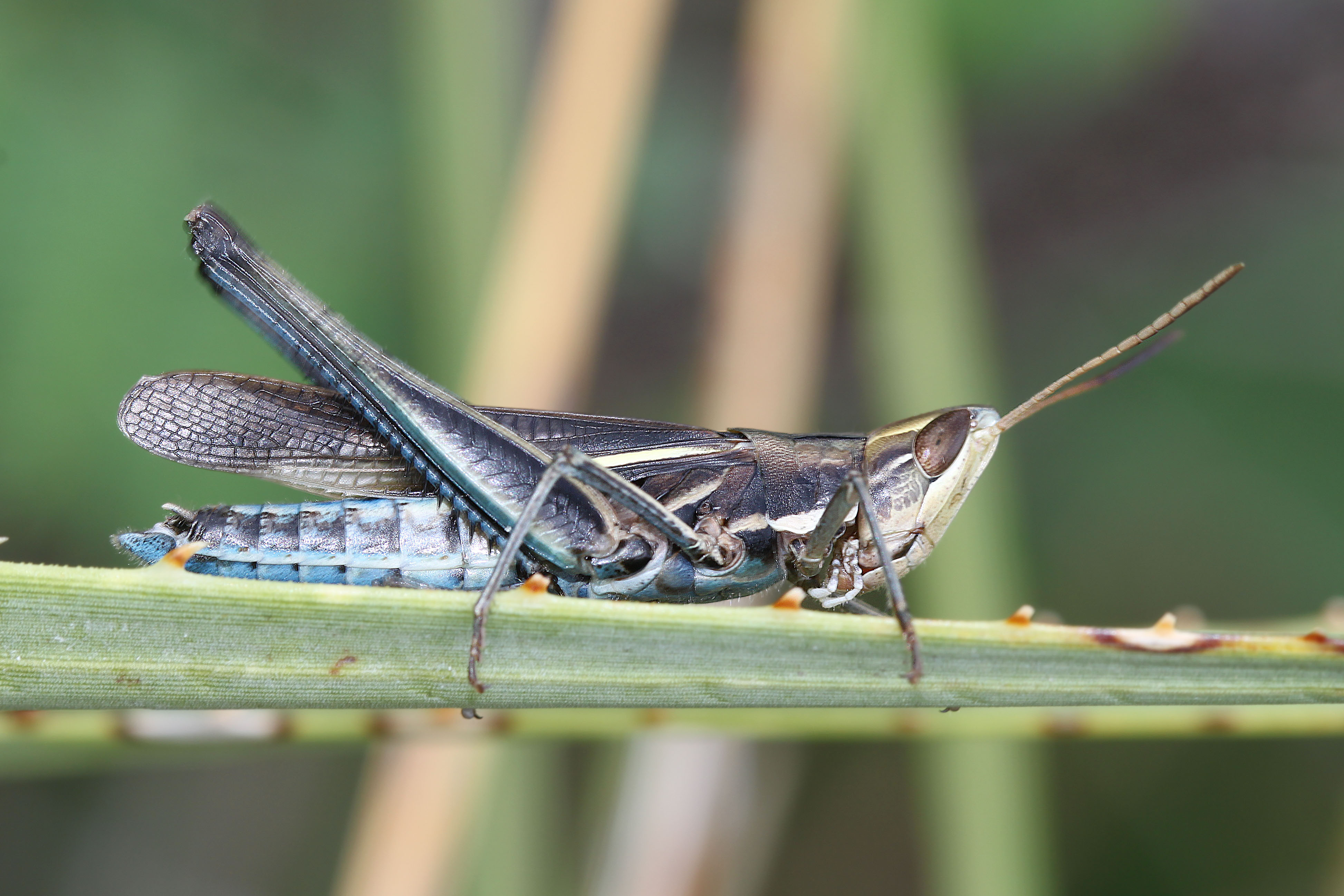

Scientific classification
- Domain: Eukaryota
- Kingdom: Animalia
- Phylum: Arthropoda
- Class: Insecta
- Order: Orthoptera
- Suborder: Caelifera
- Family: Acrididae
- Genus: Syrbula
- Species: S. montezuma

Binomial name
- Syrbula montezuma (Saussure, 1861)

= Syrbula montezuma =

Species of grasshopper

Syrbula montezuma, known generally as the Montezuma's grasshopper or slant-faced grasshopper, is a species of slant-faced grasshopper in the family Acrididae. It is found in Central America and North America.
