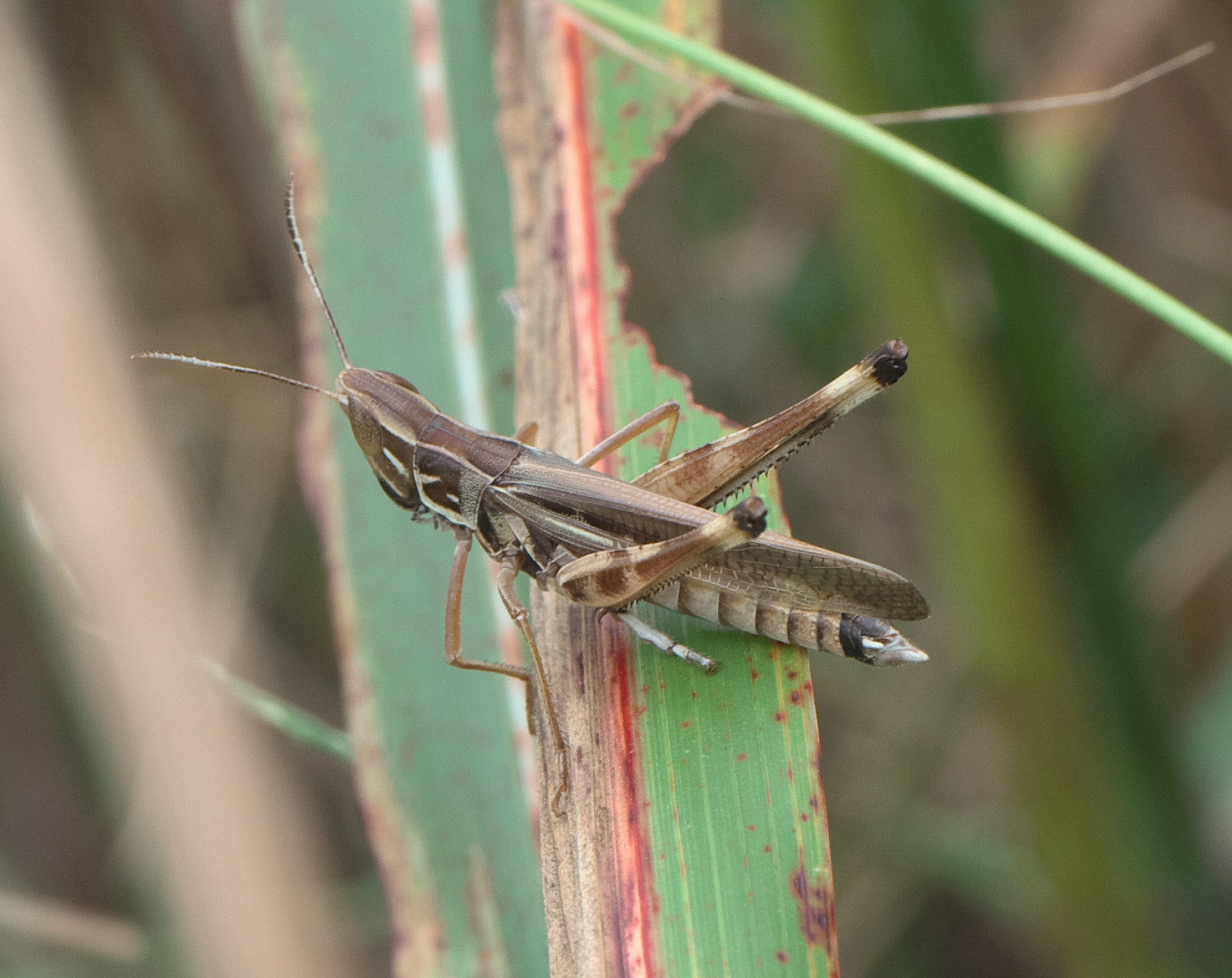
- Syrbula admirabilis

Scientific classification
- Domain: Eukaryota
- Kingdom: Animalia
- Phylum: Arthropoda
- Class: Insecta
- Order: Orthoptera
- Suborder: Caelifera
- Family: Acrididae
- Subfamily: Gomphocerinae
- Genus: Syrbula; Stål, 1873

= Syrbula =

Genus of grasshoppers

Syrbula is a genus of slant-faced grasshoppers in the family Acrididae. There are at least three described species in Syrbula.

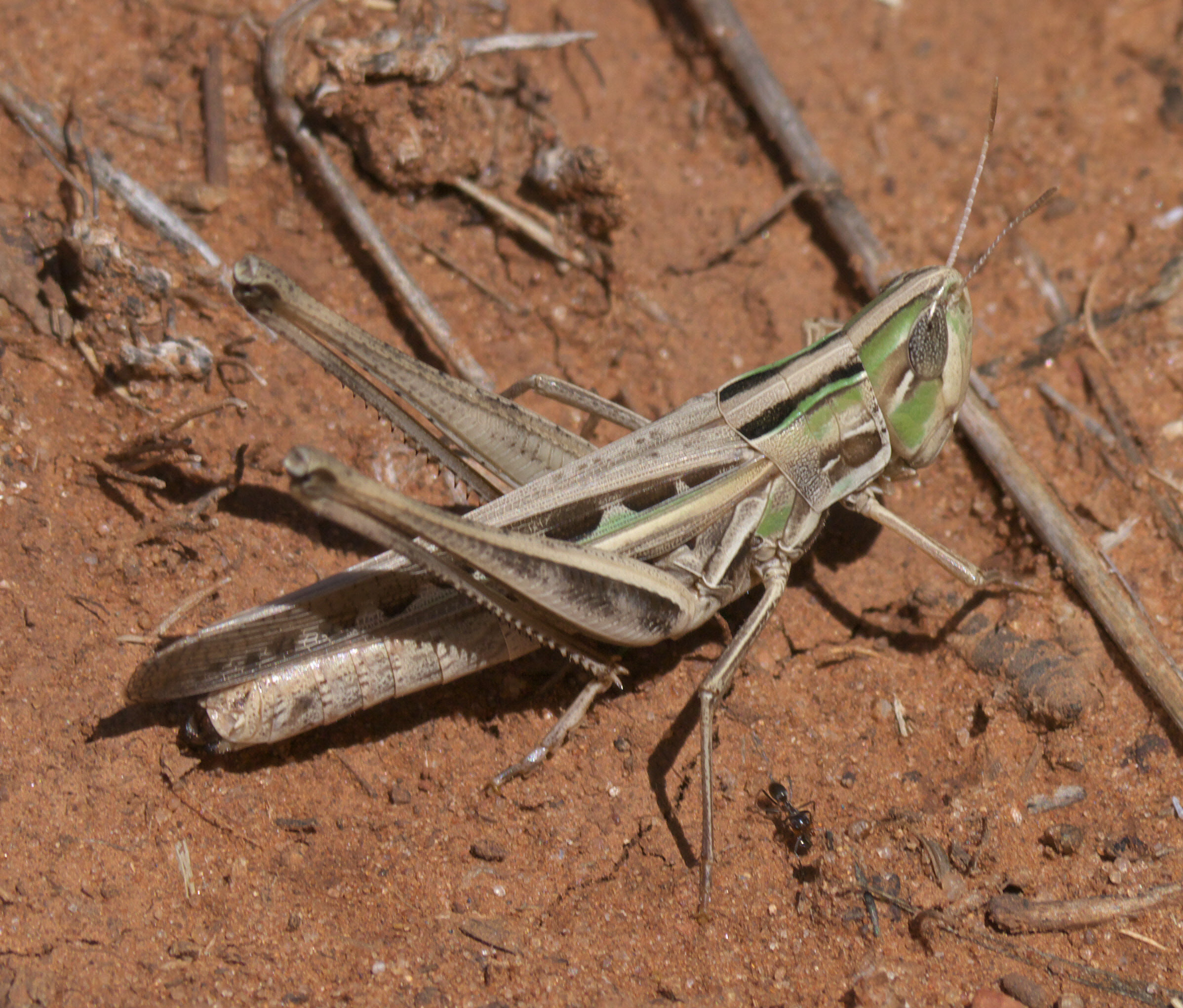
Syrbula admirabilis

== Species ==
These three species belong to the genus Syrbula:

- Syrbula admirabilis (Uhler, 1864) (admirable grasshopper)
- Syrbula festina Otte, D., 1979
- Syrbula montezuma (Saussure, 1861) (Montezuma's grasshopper)
