= Xeracris minimus =

Scientific classification
- Domain: Eukaryota
- Kingdom: Animalia
- Phylum: Arthropoda
- Class: Insecta
- Order: Orthoptera
- Suborder: Caelifera
- Family: Acrididae
- Genus: Xeracris
- Species: X. minimus

Binomial name
- Xeracris minimus (Scudder, 1900)

Species of grasshopper

Xeracris minimus, the least desert grasshopper, is a species of slant-faced grasshopper in the family Acrididae. It is found in Central America and North America.
