= Eremippus =

Scientific classification
- Domain: Eukaryota
- Kingdom: Animalia
- Phylum: Arthropoda
- Class: Insecta
- Order: Orthoptera
- Suborder: Caelifera
- Family: Acrididae
- Subfamily: Gomphocerinae
- Tribe: Dociostaurini
- Genus: Eremippus; Uvarov, 1926

Genus of grasshoppers

External image
- Images at iNaturalist

Eremippus is a genus of Palaearctic grasshoppers in the tribe Dociostaurini, erected by Boris Uvarov in 1926. Species are recorded from eastern Europe and central Asia through to eastern China (possibly incomplete distribution).

== Species ==
The Orthoptera Species File lists:

1. Eremippus angulatus Uvarov, 1934
2. Eremippus aserbeidshanicus Ramme, 1951
3. Eremippus barbarus Li & Zheng, 1993
4. Eremippus betpakdalensis Skopin, 1961
5. Eremippus beybienkoi Mistshenko, 1951
6. Eremippus carinatus Mistshenko, 1951
7. Eremippus comatus Mistshenko, 1951
8. Eremippus costatus Tarbinsky, 1927
9. Eremippus flavus Mistshenko, 1951
10. Eremippus foveolatus Mistshenko, 1951
11. Eremippus gracilis Uvarov, 1934
12. Eremippus guttatus Mistshenko, 1951
13. Eremippus haghighii Descamps, 1967
14. Eremippus heimahoensis Zheng & Hang, 1974
15. Eremippus hemipterus Malkovskiy, 1968
16. Eremippus kermanicus Mistshenko, 1976
17. Eremippus luppovae Mistshenko, 1951
18. Eremippus miramae Tarbinsky, 1927
19. Eremippus mistshenkoi Stebaev, 1965
20. Eremippus mongolicus Ramme, 1952
21. Eremippus nanus Mistshenko, 1951
22. Eremippus nudus Mistshenko, 1951
23. Eremippus onerosus Mistshenko, 1951
24. Eremippus opacus Mistshenko, 1951
25. Eremippus parvulus Mistshenko, 1951
26. Eremippus persicus Uvarov, 1929
27. Eremippus pilosus Mistshenko, 1951
28. Eremippus pusillus Bey-Bienko, 1948
29. Eremippus qilianshanensis Lian & Zheng, 1984
30. Eremippus rectus Mistshenko, 1951
31. Eremippus robustus Mistshenko, 1976
32. Eremippus sayramensis Liu, 1997
33. Eremippus selevini Skopin, 1961
34. Eremippus simplex (Eversmann, 1859) - type species (as Stenobothrus simplex Eversmann = E. simplex simplex, one of two subspecies)
35. Eremippus sobolevi Sergeev & Bugrov, 1990
36. Eremippus tenellus Mistshenko, 1951
37. Eremippus turcicus Ramme, 1951
38. Eremippus veltistshevi Miram, 1935
39. Eremippus yechengensis Liu, 1981
40. Eremippus zeybekoglui Mol, 2012
