= Xeracris =

Scientific classification
- Domain: Eukaryota
- Kingdom: Animalia
- Phylum: Arthropoda
- Class: Insecta
- Order: Orthoptera
- Suborder: Caelifera
- Family: Acrididae
- Subfamily: Gomphocerinae
- Genus: Xeracris; Caudell, 1915

Genus of grasshoppers

Xeracris is a genus of slant-faced grasshoppers in the family Acrididae. There are at least two described species in Xeracris.

== Species ==
These two species belong to the genus Xeracris:

- Xeracris minimus (Scudder, 1900) (least desert grasshopper)
- Xeracris snowi (Caudell, 1915) (Snow's desert grasshopper)
