= Notostaurus =

Scientific classification
- Domain: Eukaryota
- Kingdom: Animalia
- Phylum: Arthropoda
- Class: Insecta
- Order: Orthoptera
- Suborder: Caelifera
- Family: Acrididae
- Subfamily: Gomphocerinae
- Tribe: Dociostaurini
- Genus: Notostaurus; Bey-Bienko, 1933

Genus of grasshoppers

External image
- Images at iNaturalist

Notostaurus is a genus of Palaearctic grasshoppers in the tribe Dociostaurini, erected by Grigory Bey-Bienko in 1933. Species are recorded from: northern Africa, the middle East, eastern Europe through to temperate central Asia (probably incomplete distribution).

== Species ==
The Orthoptera Species File lists:

1. Notostaurus albicornis (Eversmann, 1848)
2. Notostaurus anatolicus (Krauss, 1896) - type species (as Dociostaurus anatolicus Krauss)
3. Notostaurus avicennai (Soltani, 1978)
4. Notostaurus larensis (Soltani, 1978)
5. Notostaurus popovi Miram, 1935
