= Xerohippus =

Scientific classification
- Kingdom: Animalia
- Phylum: Arthropoda
- Class: Insecta
- Order: Orthoptera
- Suborder: Caelifera
- Family: Acrididae
- Subfamily: Gomphocerinae
- Tribe: Dociostaurini
- Genus: Xerohippus; Uvarov, 1942

Genus of grasshoppers

External image
- Images at iNaturalist

Xerohippus is a genus of Palaearctic grasshoppers in the tribe Dociostaurini erected by Boris Uvarov in 1942. Species are recorded from North Africa, the Iberian Peninsula and the Middle East up to the Black Sea (probably incomplete distribution).

== Species ==
The Orthoptera Species File lists:

1. Xerohippus alkani Karabag, 1953
2. Xerohippus anatolicus Ramme, 1951
3. Xerohippus azami (Bolívar, 1901)
4. Xerohippus cyprius Uvarov, 1942 - type species
5. Xerohippus occidentalis Pascual & Aguirre Segura, 1996
6. Xerohippus palaestinus Uvarov, 1942
7. Xerohippus rhelbanensis (Defaut, 1984)
8. Xerohippus savignyi (Krauss, 1890)
9. Xerohippus sinuosus Uvarov, 1942
10. Xerohippus solerii (Jannone, 1936)
11. Xerohippus syriacus (Bolívar, 1911)
