= Italohippus =

Scientific classification
- Domain: Eukaryota
- Kingdom: Animalia
- Phylum: Arthropoda
- Class: Insecta
- Order: Orthoptera
- Suborder: Caelifera
- Family: Acrididae
- Subfamily: Gomphocerinae
- Genus: Italohippus; Fontana & La Greca, 1999

Genus of grasshoppers

External image
- Image at iNaturalist

Italohippus is a genus of grasshoppers in the subfamily Gomphocerinae (unassigned to any tribe); it was erected by Fontana and La Greca in 1999. To date (2022) species have only been recorded from Italy.

== Species ==
The Orthoptera Species File lists:

1. Italohippus albicornis (La Greca, 1948) - type species (as Chorthippus albicornis La Greca)
2. Italohippus modestus (Ebner, 1915)
3. Italohippus monticola (Ebner, 1915)
