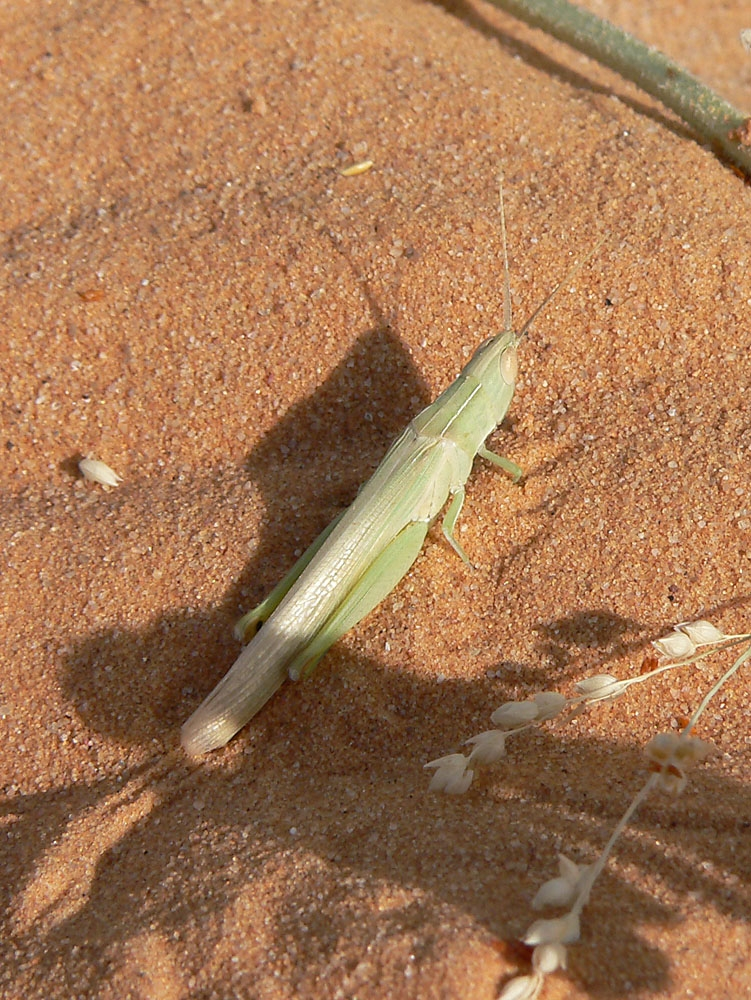
- Ochrilidia geniculata female

Scientific classification
- Domain: Eukaryota
- Kingdom: Animalia
- Phylum: Arthropoda
- Class: Insecta
- Order: Orthoptera
- Suborder: Caelifera
- Family: Acrididae
- Subfamily: Gomphocerinae
- Tribe: Ochrilidiini
- Genus: Ochrilidia; Stål, 1873

Synonyms
- Platypterna Fieber, 1853; Platypternella Salfi, 1928; Platypternopsis Chopard, 1947

= Ochrilidia =

Genus of grasshoppers

Ochrilidia is a genus of grasshoppers in the subfamily Gomphocerinae and typical of the tribe Ochrilidiini; it was erected by Carl Stål in 1873. Species have been recorded from Africa, the Middle East through to India and certain Mediterranean islands in Europe.

== Species ==
The Orthoptera Species File lists:

1. Ochrilidia ahmadi Wagan & Baloch, 2001
2. Ochrilidia albrechti Jago, 1977
3. Ochrilidia alshatiensis Usmani & Ajaili, 1991
4. Ochrilidia beybienkoi Cejchan, 1969
5. Ochrilidia cretacea (Bolívar, 1914)
6. Ochrilidia curta Bey-Bienko, 1960
7. Ochrilidia filicornis (Krauss, 1902)
8. Ochrilidia geniculata (Bolívar, 1913)
9. Ochrilidia gracilis (Krauss, 1902)
10. Ochrilidia harterti (Bolívar, 1913)
11. Ochrilidia hebetata (Uvarov, 1926)
12. Ochrilidia intermedia (Bolívar, 1908)
13. Ochrilidia jagoi Wagan, Baloch & Khatri, 2017
14. Ochrilidia johnstoni (Salfi, 1931)
15. †Ochrilidia lineata Piton, 1940
16. Ochrilidia marmorata Uvarov, 1952
17. Ochrilidia martini (Bolívar, 1908)
18. Ochrilidia mistshenkoi (Bey-Bienko, 1936)
19. Ochrilidia nubica (Werner, 1913)
20. Ochrilidia nuragica Massa, 1994
21. Ochrilidia obsoleta (Uvarov, 1936)
22. Ochrilidia orientalis Salfi, 1931
23. Ochrilidia pachypes Chopard, 1950
24. Ochrilidia pasquieri Descamps, 1968
25. Ochrilidia persica (Salfi, 1931)
26. Ochrilidia popovi Jago, 1977
27. Ochrilidia pruinosa Brunner von Wattenwyl, 1882
28. Ochrilidia richteri Bey-Bienko, 1960
29. Ochrilidia sicula (Salfi, 1931)
30. Ochrilidia socotrae Massa, 2009
31. Ochrilidia surcoufi (Chopard, 1937)
32. Ochrilidia tibialis (Fieber, 1853)
33. Ochrilidia tryxalicera Stål, 1873 - type species
34. Ochrilidia turanica (Bey-Bienko, 1936)
