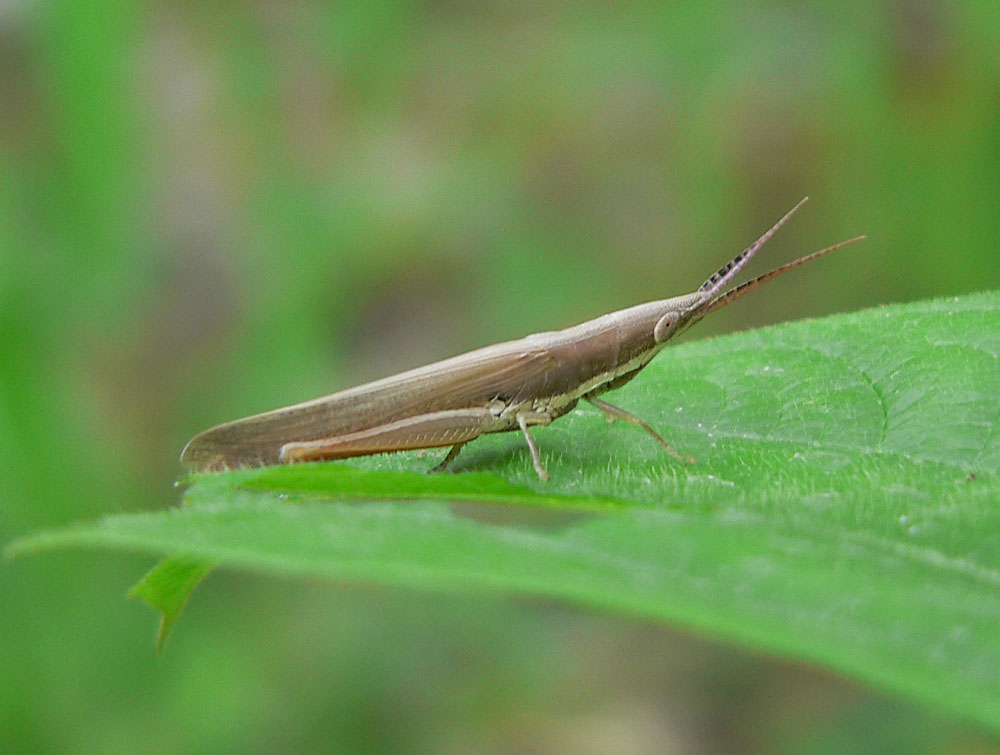
- Brachycrotaphus tryxalicerus female

Scientific classification
- Domain: Eukaryota
- Kingdom: Animalia
- Phylum: Arthropoda
- Class: Insecta
- Order: Orthoptera
- Suborder: Caelifera
- Family: Acrididae
- Subfamily: Gomphocerinae
- Genus: Brachycrotaphus; Krauss, 1877

Synonyms
- Psectrocnemus Henry, 1940

= Brachycrotaphus =

Genus of grasshoppers

Brachycrotaphus is a genus of grasshoppers in the subfamily Gomphocerinae (unassigned to any tribe), erected by Hermann August Krauss in 1877. Species have been recorded from Africa, southern Europe and India (distribution may be incomplete).

== Species ==
The Orthoptera Species File lists:

1. Brachycrotaphus brevis Uvarov, 1938
2. Brachycrotaphus buettneri Karsch, 1896
3. Brachycrotaphus elgonensis Sjöstedt, 1933
4. Brachycrotaphus hoshiarpurensis Singh, 1978
5. Brachycrotaphus indicus Uvarov, 1932
6. Brachycrotaphus karschi Uvarov, 1926
7. Brachycrotaphus kraussi Uvarov, 1932
8. Brachycrotaphus latipes (Bolívar, 1905)
9. Brachycrotaphus lloydi Uvarov, 1926
10. Brachycrotaphus longiceps (Bolívar, 1902)
11. Brachycrotaphus longicornis Jago, 1966
12. Brachycrotaphus nigericus Chopard, 1947
13. Brachycrotaphus rammei Uvarov, 1932
14. Brachycrotaphus sjostedti Uvarov, 1932
15. Brachycrotaphus tryxalicerus (Fischer, 1853) - type species (as Brachycrotaphus steindachneri Krauss)
