= Horesidotes =

Scientific classification
- Domain: Eukaryota
- Kingdom: Animalia
- Phylum: Arthropoda
- Class: Insecta
- Order: Orthoptera
- Suborder: Caelifera
- Family: Acrididae
- Subfamily: Gomphocerinae
- Genus: Horesidotes; Scudder, 1899

Genus of grasshoppers

Horesidotes is a genus of slant-faced grasshoppers in the family Acrididae. There are at least two described species in Horesidotes.

== Species ==
These two species belong to the genus Horesidotes:

- Horesidotes cinereus Scudder, 1899 (ash-gray range grasshopper)
- Horesidotes deiradonotus (Jago, 1971)
