= Gelastorhinus =

Scientific classification
- Domain: Eukaryota
- Kingdom: Animalia
- Phylum: Arthropoda
- Class: Insecta
- Order: Orthoptera
- Suborder: Caelifera
- Family: Acrididae
- Subfamily: Gomphocerinae
- Genus: Gelastorhinus; Brunner von Wattenwyl, 1893

Type species
- Gelastorhinus albolineatus Brunner von Wattenwyl, 1893

Synonyms
- Gelastorrhinus Burr, 1902

Genus of grasshoppers

Gelastorhinus is a genus of grasshoppers in the subfamily Gomphocerinae (no tribe assigned). Species have been recorded from tropical Africa and Asia.

== Species ==
The Orthoptera Species File lists:

1. Gelastorhinus liaoningensis Lu, Wang & Ren, 2013
2. Gelastorhinus africanus Uvarov, 1941
3. Gelastorhinus albolineatus Brunner von Wattenwyl, 1893
  type species (locality: Bhamo, Myanmar)
4. Gelastorhinus baghensis Mahmood & Yousuf, 1998
5. Gelastorhinus chinensis Willemse, 1932
6. Gelastorhinus dubia Willemse, 1932
7. Gelastorhinus edax Saussure, 1899
8. Gelastorhinus filatus (Walker, 1870)
9. Gelastorhinus glacialis Fritze, 1900
10. Gelastorhinus insulans Bey-Bienko, 1966
11. Gelastorhinus laticornis (Serville, 1838)
12. Gelastorhinus liaoningensis Wang, 2007
13. Gelastorhinus macilentus (Stål, 1877)
14. Gelastorhinus pictus (Walker, 1870)
15. Gelastorhinus rotundatus Shiraki, 1910
16. Gelastorhinus selache Burr, 1902
17. Gelastorhinus semipictus (Walker, 1870)
18. Gelastorhinus sinensis (Walker, 1871)
19. Gelastorhinus striatus Willemse, 1932
20. Gelastorhinus taeniatus (Serville, 1838)
21. Gelastorhinus tibialis (Serville, 1838)
22. Gelastorhinus tonkinensis Willemse, 1951
23. Gelastorhinus tryxaloides Bolívar, 1902
