= Heliaula =

Scientific classification
- Domain: Eukaryota
- Kingdom: Animalia
- Phylum: Arthropoda
- Class: Insecta
- Order: Orthoptera
- Suborder: Caelifera
- Family: Acrididae
- Subfamily: Gomphocerinae
- Genus: Heliaula; Caudell, 1915
- Species: H. rufa

Binomial name
- Heliaula rufa (Scudder, 1899)

Genus of grasshoppers

Heliaula is a genus of slant-faced grasshoppers in the family Acrididae. There is one described species in Heliaula, H. rufa.
