= Gonista =

Scientific classification
- Domain: Eukaryota
- Kingdom: Animalia
- Phylum: Arthropoda
- Class: Insecta
- Order: Orthoptera
- Suborder: Caelifera
- Family: Acrididae
- Subfamily: Gomphocerinae
- Tribe: Ochrilidiini
- Genus: Gonista; Bolívar, 1898

Type species
- Gonista antennata Bolívar,1898

Synonyms
- Carcharacris Bolívar, 1914

Genus of grasshoppers

Gonista is a genus of grasshoppers in the family Acrididae, subfamily Gomphocerinae, and tribe Ochrilidiini; species are distributed in China and SE Asia.

== Species ==
The Orthoptera Species File lists:

1. Gonista bicolor (Haan, 1842) - type species (locality: Siboga, Sumatra)
2. Gonista chayuensis Yin, 1984
3. Gonista chinensis Willemse, 1932
4. Gonista chloroticus Bolívar, 1914
5. Gonista damingshanus Li, Lu, Jiang & Meng, 1991
6. Gonista longicercata Bouvy, 1982
7. Gonista meridionalis Johnsen, 1983
8. Gonista occidentalis Descamps, 1965
9. Gonista rotundata Uvarov, 1933
10. Gonista sagitta (Uvarov, 1912)
11. Gonista wenquanensis Zheng & Yao, 2006
12. Gonista yunnana Zheng, 1980
