= Ageneotettix =

Scientific classification
- Domain: Eukaryota
- Kingdom: Animalia
- Phylum: Arthropoda
- Class: Insecta
- Order: Orthoptera
- Suborder: Caelifera
- Family: Acrididae
- Subfamily: Gomphocerinae
- Genus: Ageneotettix; McNeill, 1897

Genus of grasshoppers

Ageneotettix is a genus of slant-faced grasshoppers in the family Acrididae. There are at least three described species in Ageneotettix.

== Species ==
These three species belong to the genus Ageneotettix:

- Ageneotettix brevipennis (Bruner, 1904) (short-wing big-headed grasshopper)
- Ageneotettix deorum (Scudder, 1876) (white-whiskered grasshopper)
- Ageneotettix salutator (Rehn, 1927)
