= Fenestra (grasshopper) =

Scientific classification
- Kingdom: Animalia
- Phylum: Arthropoda
- Clade: Pancrustacea
- Class: Insecta
- Order: Orthoptera
- Suborder: Caelifera
- Family: Acrididae
- Tribe: Amblytropidiini
- Genus: Fenestra; Brunner von Wattenwyl, 1895

Synonyms
- Dichroatettix Bruner, 1900; Xenacris Hebard, 1924

Genus of grasshoppers

Fenestra is a genus of grasshoppers in the subfamily Gomphocerinae with species found in South America.

== Species ==
The following species are recognised in the genus Fenestra:

- Fenestra bohlsii Giglio-Tos, 1895
- Fenestra ensicorne Rehn, 1913
- Fenestra orientalis (Bruner, 1913)
- Fenestra platyceps (Hebard, 1924)
