= Eupnigodes =

Scientific classification
- Domain: Eukaryota
- Kingdom: Animalia
- Phylum: Arthropoda
- Class: Insecta
- Order: Orthoptera
- Suborder: Caelifera
- Family: Acrididae
- Subfamily: Gomphocerinae
- Genus: Eupnigodes; McNeill, 1897

Genus of grasshoppers

Eupnigodes is a genus of slant-faced grasshoppers in the family Acrididae. There are at least two described species in Eupnigodes, both found in the western United States.

== Species ==
These two species belong to the genus Eupnigodes:

- Eupnigodes megocephala (McNeill, 1897) (big-headed grasshopper)
- Eupnigodes sierranus (Rehn & Hebard, 1909) (sierran white-whiskered grasshopper)
