= Rammeihippus =

Scientific classification
- Domain: Eukaryota
- Kingdom: Animalia
- Phylum: Arthropoda
- Class: Insecta
- Order: Orthoptera
- Suborder: Caelifera
- Family: Acrididae
- Subfamily: Gomphocerinae
- Genus: Rammeihippus; Woznessenskij, 1996

Synonyms
- Microhippus Ramme, 1939

Genus of grasshoppers

External image
- Image at iNaturalist

Rammeihippus is a genus of grasshoppers in the subfamily Gomphocerinae (unassigned to any tribe), erected by Woznessenskij in 1996 as a nomen novum. (The junior homonym Microhippus had been erected by Willy Ramme in 1939.) As of 2022 there are two known species with a recorded distribution in the Balkans and Turkey (but this may be incomplete).

== Species ==
The Orthoptera Species File lists:

1. Rammeihippus dinaricus (Götz, 1970)
2. Rammeihippus turcicus (Ramme, 1939) - type species (as Microhippus turcicus Ramme)
