= Eritettix =

- Eritettix simplex

Scientific classification
- Kingdom: Animalia
- Phylum: Arthropoda
- Clade: Pancrustacea
- Class: Insecta
- Order: Orthoptera
- Suborder: Caelifera
- Family: Acrididae
- Subfamily: Gomphocerinae
- Tribe: Eritettigini
- Genus: Eritettix; Bruner, 1890

Genus of grasshoppers

Eritettix is a genus of slant-faced grasshoppers in the family Acrididae. There are at least four described species in Eritettix.

== Species ==
These four species belong to the genus Eritettix:

- Eritettix abortivus Bruner, 1890 (Texas short-winged slant-face grasshopper)
- Eritettix carinatus (Scudder, 1902)
- Eritettix obscurus (Scudder, 1878) (obscure grasshopper)
- Eritettix simplex (Scudder, 1869) (velvet-striped grasshopper) - type species (as Eritettix variabilis Bruner)
