= Pseudopomala =

Scientific classification
- Domain: Eukaryota
- Kingdom: Animalia
- Phylum: Arthropoda
- Class: Insecta
- Order: Orthoptera
- Suborder: Caelifera
- Family: Acrididae
- Tribe: Mermiriini
- Genus: Pseudopomala; Morse, 1896
- Species: P. brachyptera

Binomial name
- Pseudopomala brachyptera (Scudder, 1863)

Genus of grasshoppers

Pseudopomala is a genus of slant-faced grasshoppers in the family Acrididae. There is one described species in Pseudopomala, P. brachyptera.
