= Acantherus =

Scientific classification
- Kingdom: Animalia
- Phylum: Arthropoda
- Clade: Pancrustacea
- Class: Insecta
- Order: Orthoptera
- Suborder: Caelifera
- Family: Acrididae
- Genus: Acantherus; Scudder & Cockerell, 1902
- Species: A. piperatus

Binomial name
- Acantherus piperatus Scudder & Cockerell, 1902

Genus of grasshoppers

Acantherus is a genus of slant-faced grasshoppers in the family Acrididae. There is one described species in Acantherus, A. piperatus from North America.
