= Prorocorypha =

Scientific classification
- Kingdom: Animalia
- Phylum: Arthropoda
- Clade: Pancrustacea
- Class: Insecta
- Order: Orthoptera
- Suborder: Caelifera
- Family: Acrididae
- Genus: Prorocorypha; Rehn, 1911
- Species: P. snowi

Binomial name
- Prorocorypha snowi Rehn, 1911

Genus of grasshoppers

Prorocorypha is a genus of slant-faced grasshoppers in the family Acrididae. There is one described species: P. snowi.
