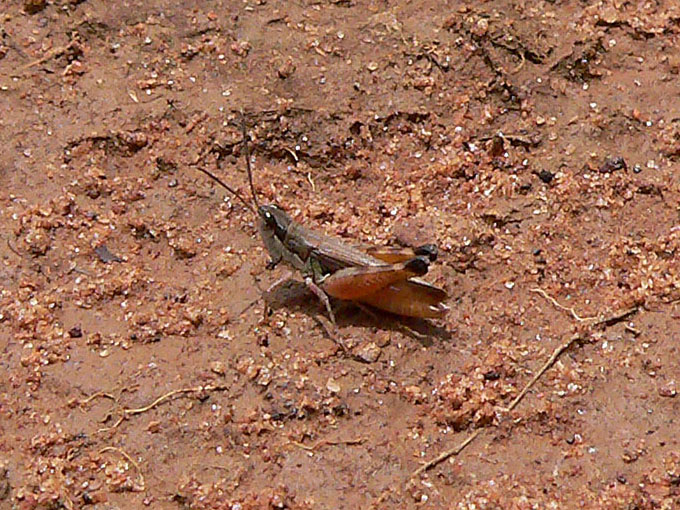
- Leva soudanica male

Scientific classification
- Kingdom: Animalia
- Phylum: Arthropoda
- Clade: Pancrustacea
- Class: Insecta
- Order: Orthoptera
- Suborder: Caelifera
- Family: Acrididae
- Tribe: Dociostaurini
- Genus: Leva; Bolívar, 1909

Type species
- Gymnobothrus indicus Bolívar, 1909

Synonyms
- Bodenheimerella Uvarov, 1933

= Leva (grasshopper) =

Genus of grasshoppers

Leva is a genus of grasshoppers in the subfamily Gomphocerinae with species found in Africa and Asia.

== Species ==
The following species are recognised in the genus Leva:

- Leva aethiopica Bolívar, 1922
- Leva arabica (Uvarov, 1936)
- Leva astipta Jago, 1996
- Leva burmana Jago, 1996
- Leva callosa Uvarov, 1922
- Leva guichardi Jago, 1996
- Leva hackeri Ingrisch, 1999
- Leva hemiptera (Uvarov, 1952)
- Leva incilicula Jago, 1996
- Leva indica (Bolívar, 1902) - type species
- Leva jordanica (Uvarov, 1933)
- Leva magna Jago, 1996
- Leva nicholai Baccetti, 1985
- Leva obtusa Ingrisch, 1999
- Leva paraindica Jago, 1996
- Leva perexigua Jago, 1996
- Leva popovi Jago, 1996
- Leva soluta Bolívar, 1914
- Leva soudanica Descamps, 1965
- Leva striolifrons Jago, 1996
