= Peruvia =

Scientific classification
- Domain: Eukaryota
- Kingdom: Animalia
- Phylum: Arthropoda
- Class: Insecta
- Order: Orthoptera
- Suborder: Caelifera
- Family: Acrididae
- Tribe: Amblytropidiini
- Genus: Peruvia; Scudder, 1890

Type species
- Machaerocera nigromarginata Scudder, 1875

Genus of grasshoppers

Peruvia is a genus of South American grasshoppers comprising two species:

- Peruvia jagoi Cadena-Castañeda & Cardona, 2015
- Peruvia nigromarginata (Scudder, 1875)
