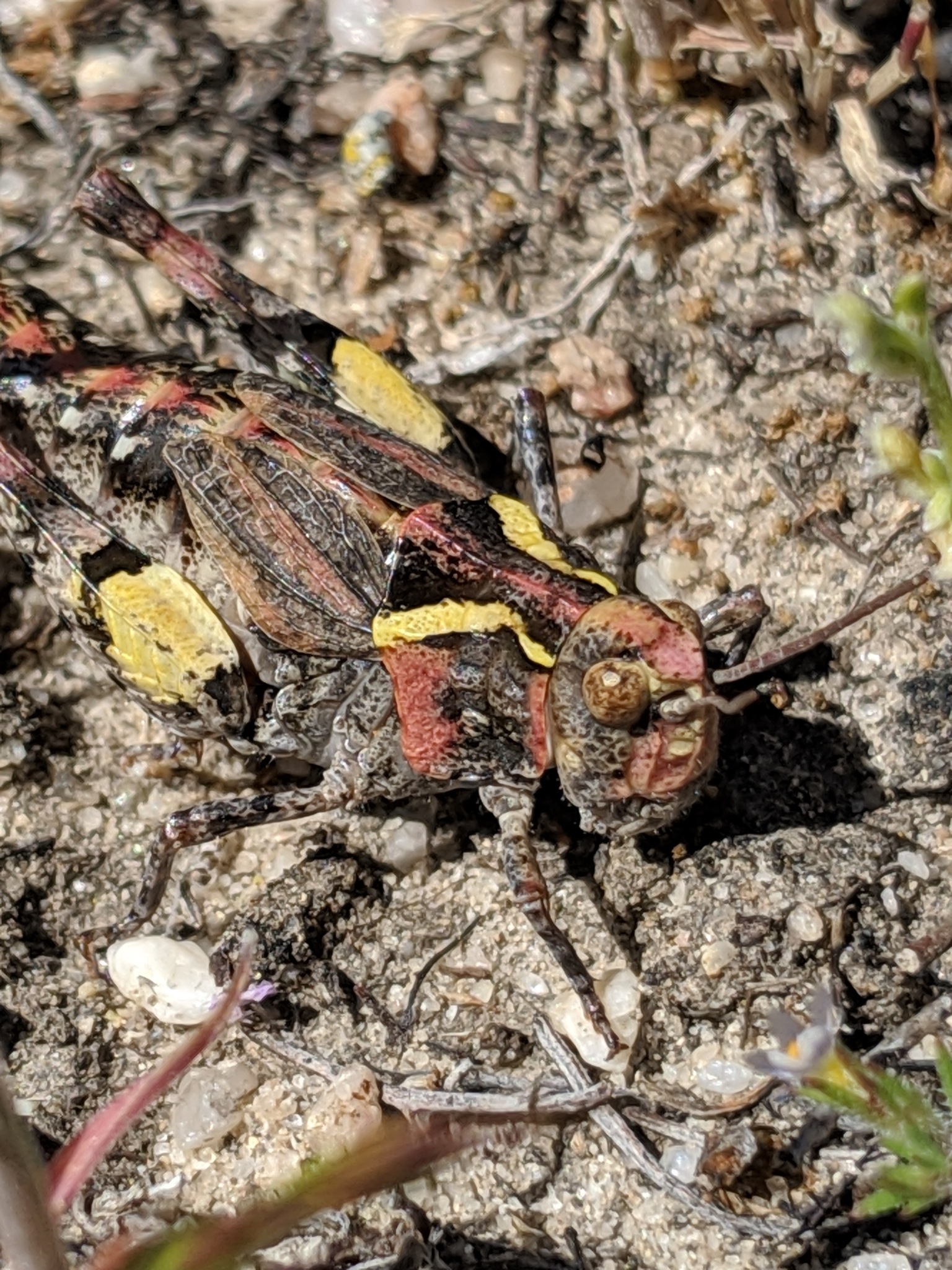
- Esselenia vanduzeei vanduzeei, California, USA

Scientific classification
- Kingdom: Animalia
- Phylum: Arthropoda
- Clade: Pancrustacea
- Class: Insecta
- Order: Orthoptera
- Suborder: Caelifera
- Family: Acrididae
- Genus: Esselenia; Hebard, 1920
- Species: E. vanduzeei

Binomial name
- Esselenia vanduzeei Hebard, 1920

= Esselenia =

Genus of grasshoppers

Esselenia is a genus of slant-faced grasshoppers in the family Acrididae. There is one described species in Esselenia, E. vanduzeei.

Esselenia vanduzeei has two described subspecies:

- Esselenia vanduzeei vanduzeei Hebard, 1920
- Esselenia vanduzeei violae Rentz, 1966
