= Alota (grasshopper) =

Scientific classification
- Kingdom: Animalia
- Phylum: Arthropoda
- Clade: Pancrustacea
- Class: Insecta
- Order: Orthoptera
- Suborder: Caelifera
- Family: Acrididae
- Tribe: Scyllinini
- Genus: Alota; Bruner, 1913

Type species
- Alota boliviana Bruner, 1913

Genus of grasshoppers

Alota is a genus of grasshoppers in the subfamily Gomphocerinae with species found in Bolivia and Colombia.

== Species ==
The following species are recognised in the genus Alota:

- Alota boliviana Bruner, 1913
- Alota carbonelli Cadena-Castañeda & Cardona, 2015
