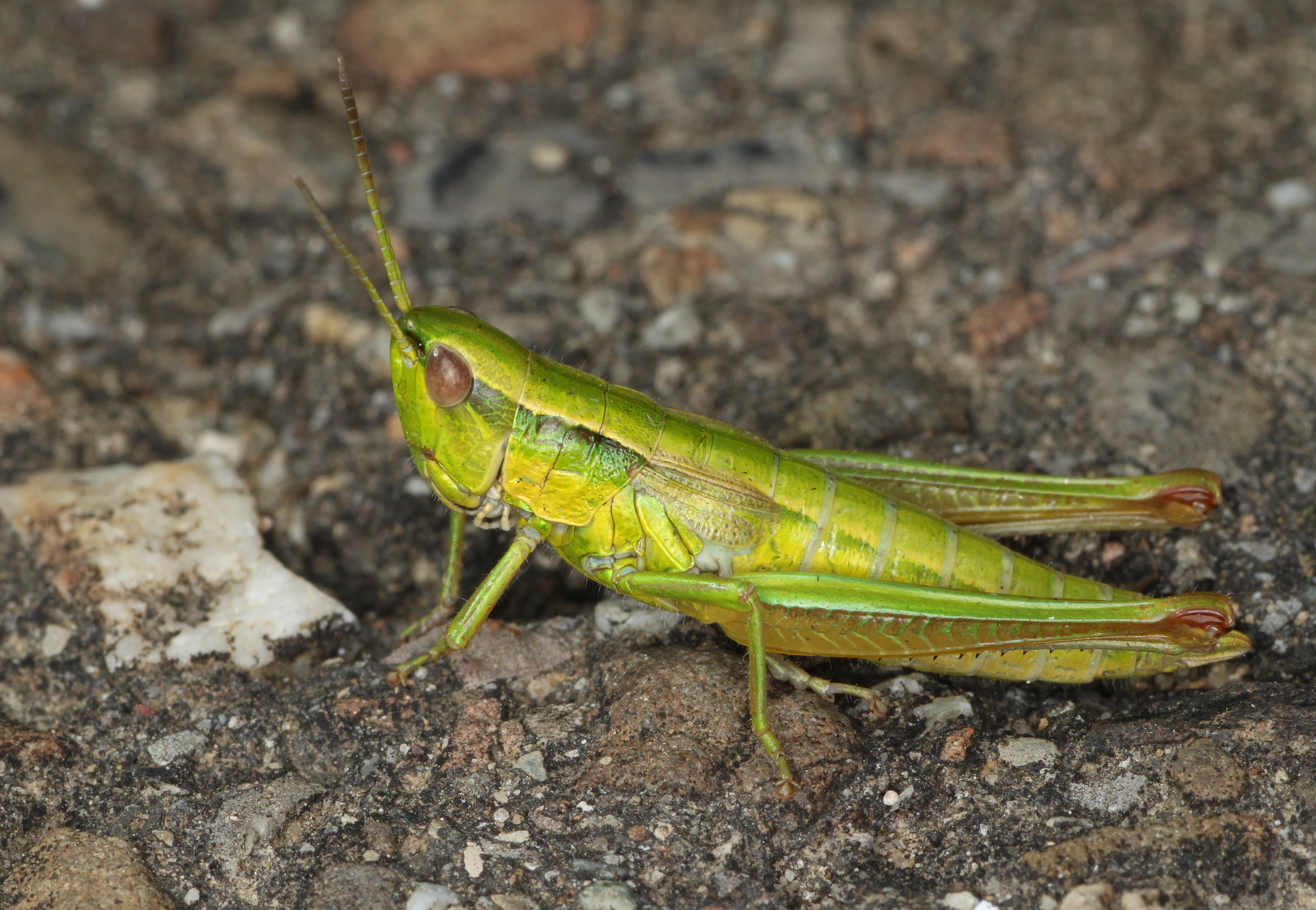
- Euthystira brachyptera

Scientific classification
- Kingdom: Animalia
- Phylum: Arthropoda
- Class: Insecta
- Order: Orthoptera
- Suborder: Caelifera
- Family: Acrididae
- Subfamily: Gomphocerinae; Fieber, 1853

Type genus
- Gomphocerus Thunberg, 1815

Tribes
- 18, see text.

Synonyms
- Gomphoceri Fieber, 1853; Gomphoceridae Fieber, 1853; Mesopes Brunner von Wattenwyl, 1893

= Gomphocerinae =

Subfamily of grasshoppers

Gomphocerinae, sometimes called "slant-faced grasshoppers", are a subfamily of grasshoppers found in every continent except Antarctica and Australia. There are at least 192 genera in this subfamily, further dividing into at least 1,274 species. Gomphocerinae species are most often found in swamp, desert, tundra and tropical rainforest environments. The defining characteristic of these insects is the uniformity and location of their femoral stridulatory mechanism.

== Tribes and genera ==
Tribes and genera include:

=== Arcypterini ===
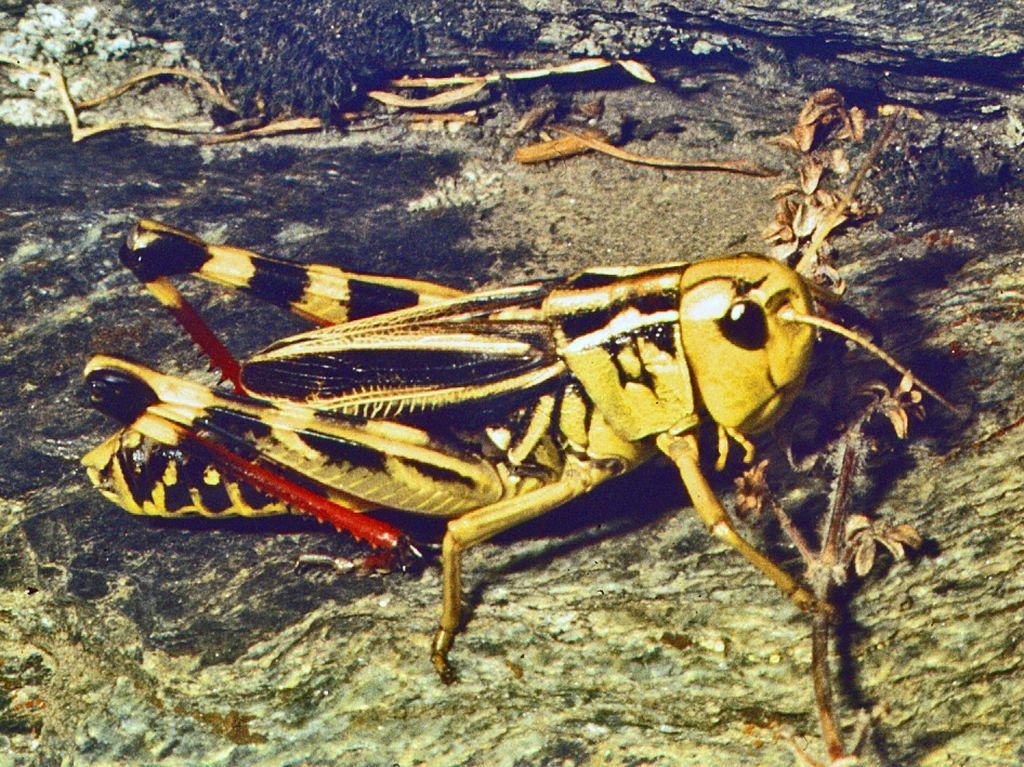
Arcyptera fusca female

Auth.: Bolívar, 1914 - Africa, Palearctic, mainland Asia

1. Adolfius Harz, 1988
2. Amplicubitoacris Zheng, 2010
3. Arcyptera Serville, 1838
4. Asulconotoides Liu, 1984
5. Asulconotus Ying, 1974
6. Aulacobothrus Bolívar, 1902
7. Berengueria Bolívar, 1909
8. Brachypteracris Cao & Zheng, 1996
9. Crucinotacris Jago, 1996
10. Kangacris Yin, 1983
11. Kangacrisoides Wang, Zheng & Niu, 2006
12. Leionotacris Jago, 1996
13. Leuconemacris Zheng, 1988
14. Ningxiacris Zheng & He, 1997
15. Pseudoarcyptera Bolívar, 1909
16. Ptygonotus Tarbinsky, 1927
17. Rhaphotittha Karsch, 1896
18. Suacris Yin, Zhang & Li, 2002
19. Transtympanacris Lian & Zheng, 1985
20. Xinjiangacris Zheng, 1993

=== Other tribes A ===
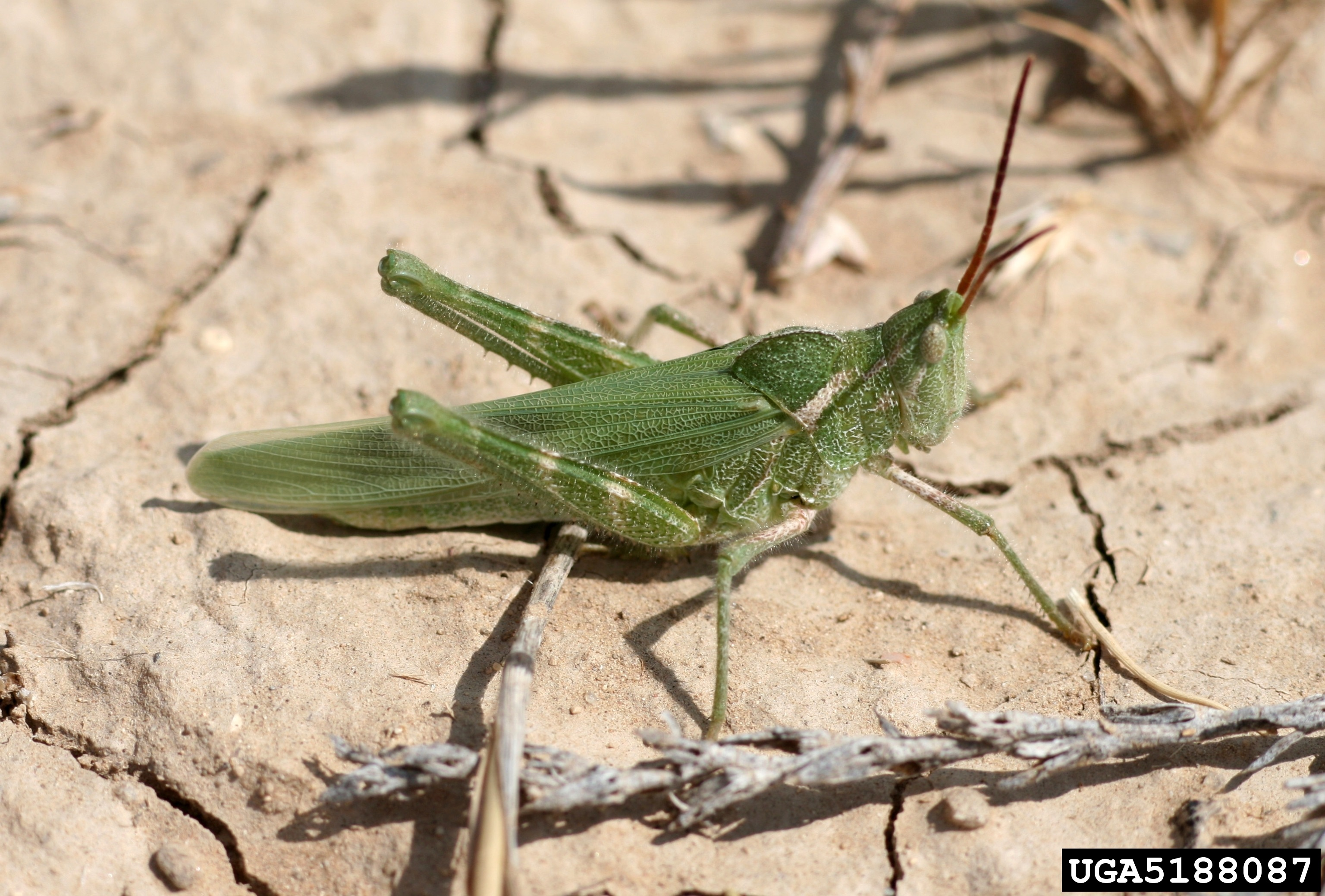
Acrolophitus hirtipes

- Acrolophitini Scudder, 1901 - Nearctic
  - Acrolophitus Thomas, 1871
  - Bootettix Bruner, 1889
- Amblytropidiini Brunner von Wattenwyl, 1893 - Americas
  - Genus group Peruviae Cadena-Castañeda & Cardona, 2015
    - Apolobama Bruner, 1913
    - Peruvia Scudder, 1890
  - Amblytropidia Stål, 1873
  - Boopedon Thomas, 1870
  - Caribacris Rehn & Hebard, 1938
  - Fenestra Brunner von Wattenwyl, 1895
  - Pseudoutanacris Jago, 1971
  - Sinipta Stål, 1861
  - Syrbula Stål, 1873
- Aulocarini Contreras & Chapco, 2006 - Nearctic
  - Ageneotettix McNeill, 1897
  - Aulocara Scudder, 1876
  - Eupnigodes McNeill, 1897
  - Horesidotes Scudder, 1899
  - Psoloessa Scudder, 1875

=== Tribes C ===
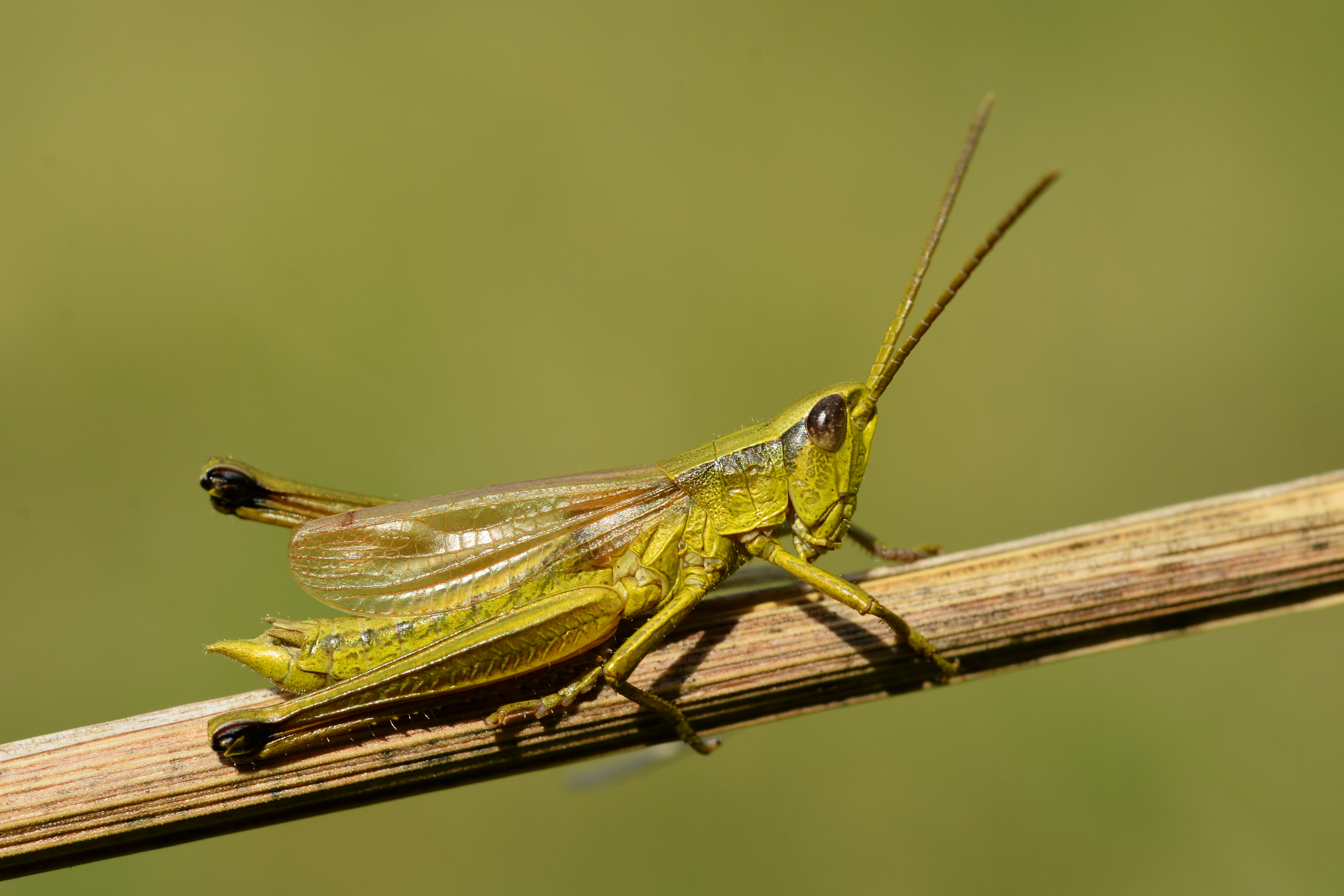
Chrysochraon dispar male

- Chrysochraontini Brunner von Wattenwyl, 1893 - Nearctic, Palaerctic
  - Barracris Gurney, Strohecker & Helfer, 1964
  - Chloealtis Harris, 1841
  - Chrysochraon Fischer, 1853
  - Confusacris Yin & Li, 1987
  - Euchorthippus Tarbinsky, 1926
  - Euthystira Fieber, 1852
  - Euthystiroides Zhang, Zheng & Ren, 1995
  - Mongolotettix Rehn, 1928
  - Podismomorpha Lian & Zheng, 1984
  - Podismopsis Zubovski, 1900
  - Pseudoasonus Yin, 1982
- Cibolacrini Otte, 1981 - Nearctic
  - Cibolacris Hebard, 1937
  - Heliaula Caudell, 1916
  - Ligurotettix McNeill, 1897
  - Xeracris Caudell, 1916
- Compsacrini Carbonell, 1995 - Americas
  - Chiapacris Otte, 1979
  - Compsacris Bolívar, 1890
  - Notopomala Jago, 1971
  - Phaneroturis Bruner, 1904
  - Silvitettix Bruner, 1904
  - Staurorhectus Giglio-Tos, 1897

=== Dociostaurini ===
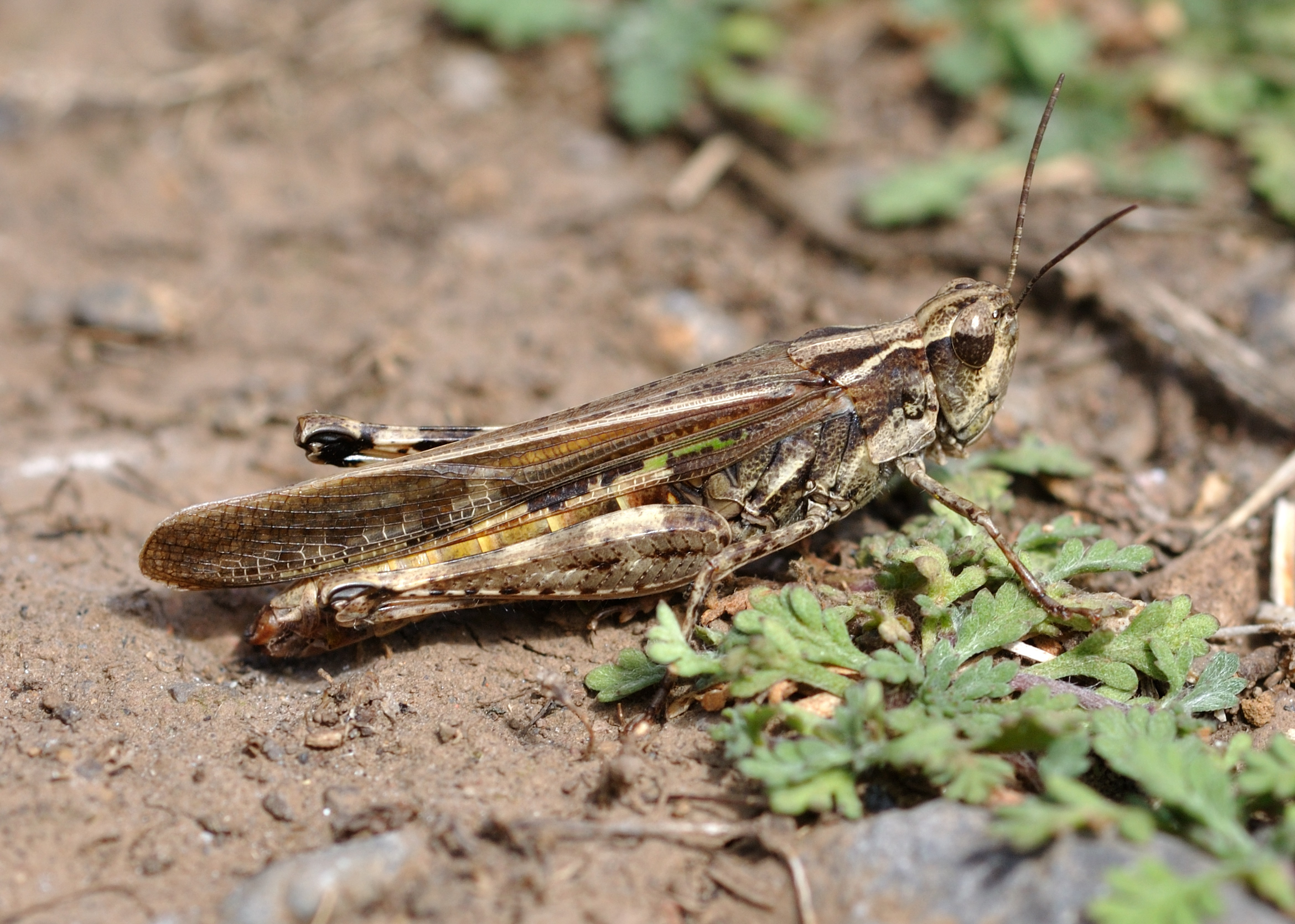
Dociostaurus maroccanus

Auth. Mistshenko, 1974; distribution: Africa, mainland Europe and Asia

1. Albistriacris Zheng & Lu, 2002
2. Dociostaurus Fieber, 1853
3. Eremippus Uvarov, 1926
4. Eremitusacris Liu, 1981
5. Leva Bolívar, 1909
6. Mizonocara Uvarov, 1912
7. Notostaurus Bey-Bienko, 1933
8. Xerohippus Uvarov, 1942

=== Eritettigini ===
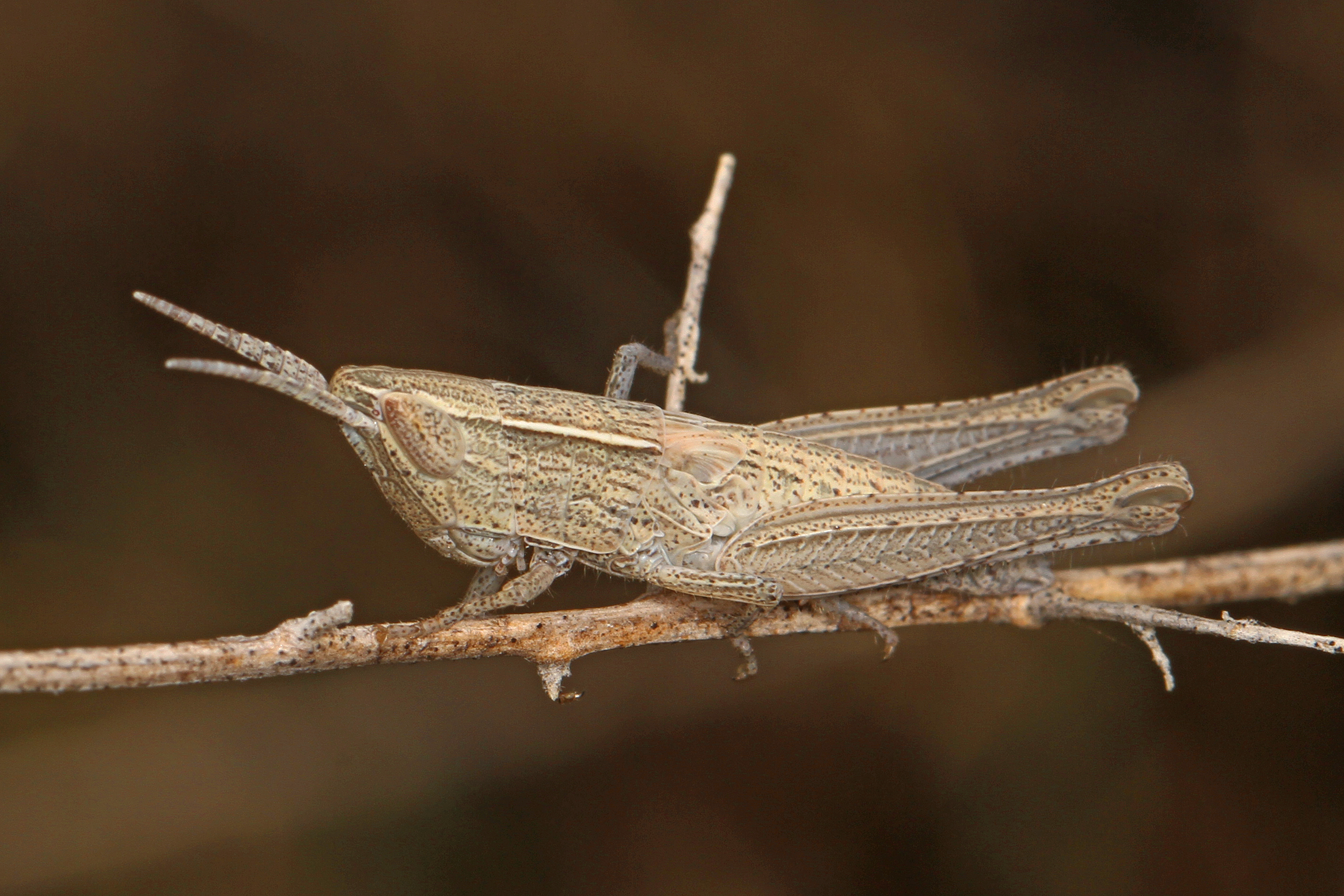
Opeia obscura

Auth. Otte, 1981: Nearctic

1. Amphitornus McNeill, 1897
2. Compsacrella - monotypic C. poecila Rehn & Hebard, 1938
3. Eritettix Bruner, 1889
4. Opeia McNeill, 1897

=== Gomphocerini ===
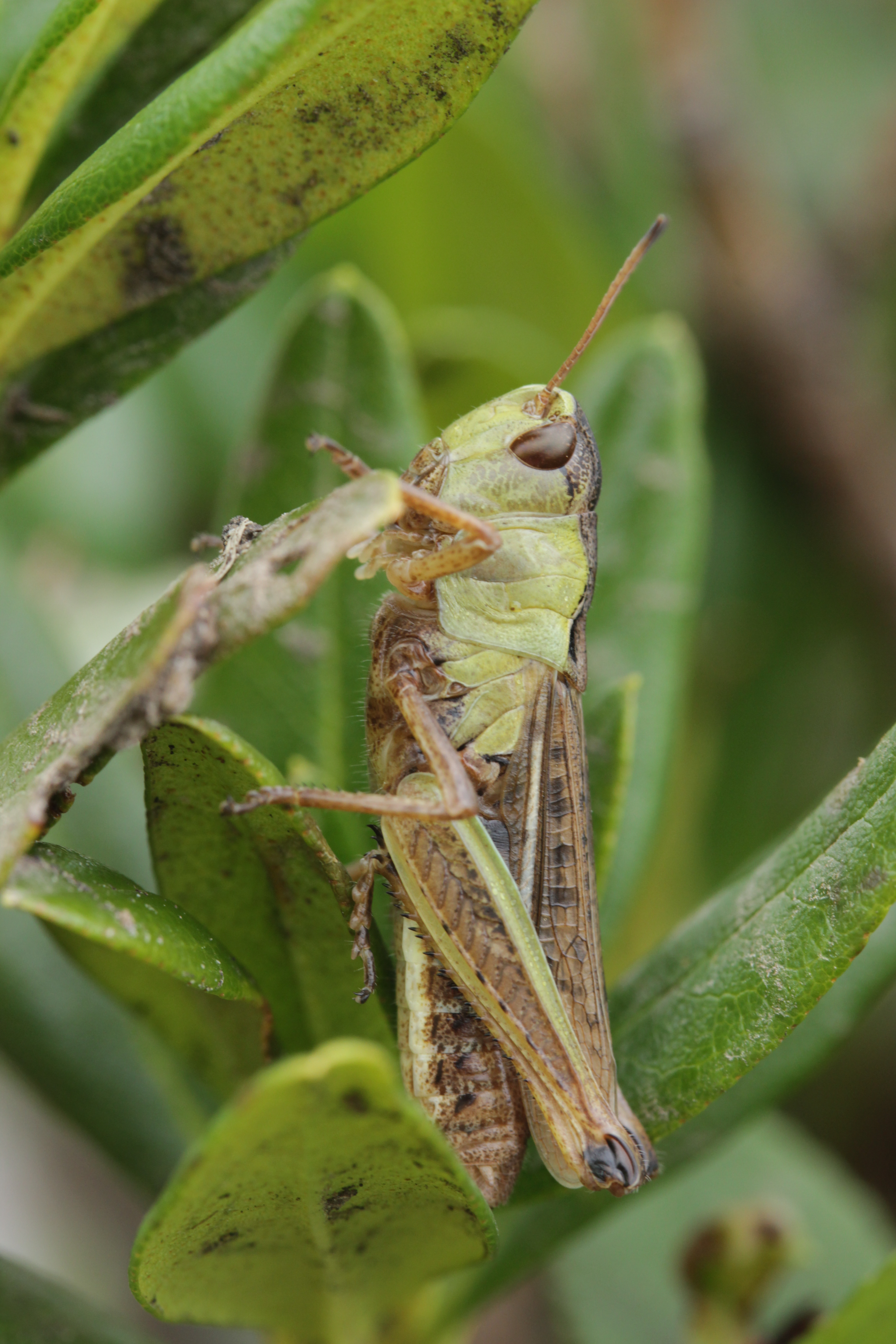
Female Gomphocerus sibiricus (Gomphocerini)

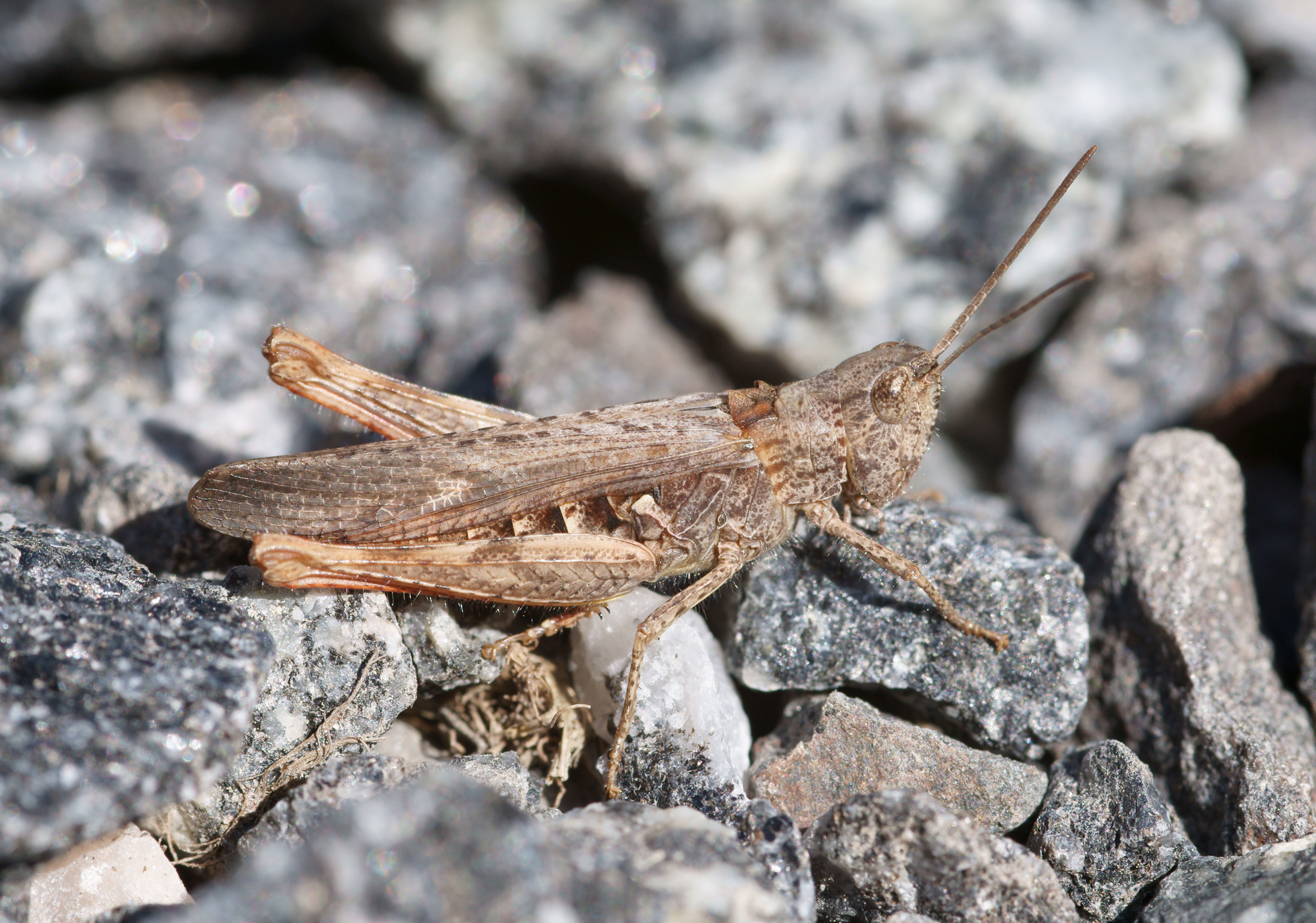
Chorthippus (Glyptobothrus) sp.

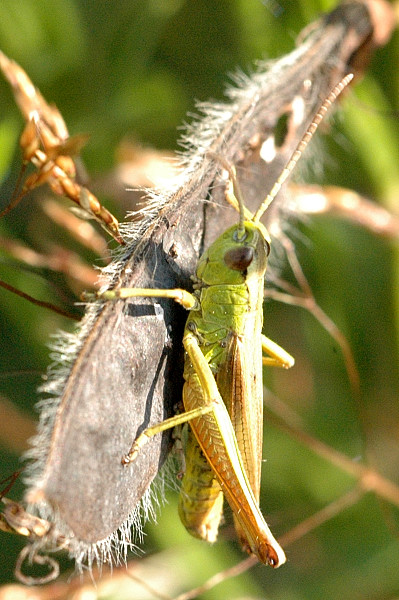
Chorthippus montanus

Auth. Fieber, 1853; widespread - selected genera

- Aeropedellus Hebard, 1935
- Bruneria McNeill, 1897
- Chorthippus Fieber, 1852
- Gomphoceridius Bolívar, 1914
- Gomphocerippus Roberts, 1941
- Gomphocerus Thunberg, 1815
- Myrmeleotettix Bolívar, 1914
- Pseudochorthippus Defaut, 2012

=== Hypernephiini ===
Auth. Mistshenko, 1973; distribution central Asia

1. Anaptygus Mistshenko, 1951
2. Asonus Yin, 1982
3. Caucasippus Uvarov, 1927
4. Dysanema Uvarov, 1925
5. Eclipophleps Tarbinsky, 1927
6. Grigorija Mistshenko, 1976
7. Hebetacris Liu, 1981
8. Hypernephia Uvarov, 1922
9. Oknosacris Liu, 1981
10. Oreoptygonotus Tarbinsky, 1927
11. Ptygippus Mistshenko, 1951
12. Saxetophilus Umnov, 1930
13. Stristernum Liu, 1981

=== Tribes M ===
Melanotettigini Otte, 1981 monotypic tribe and genus - North America

- Melanotettix: Melanotettix dibelonius Bruner, 1904

=== Mermiriini ===
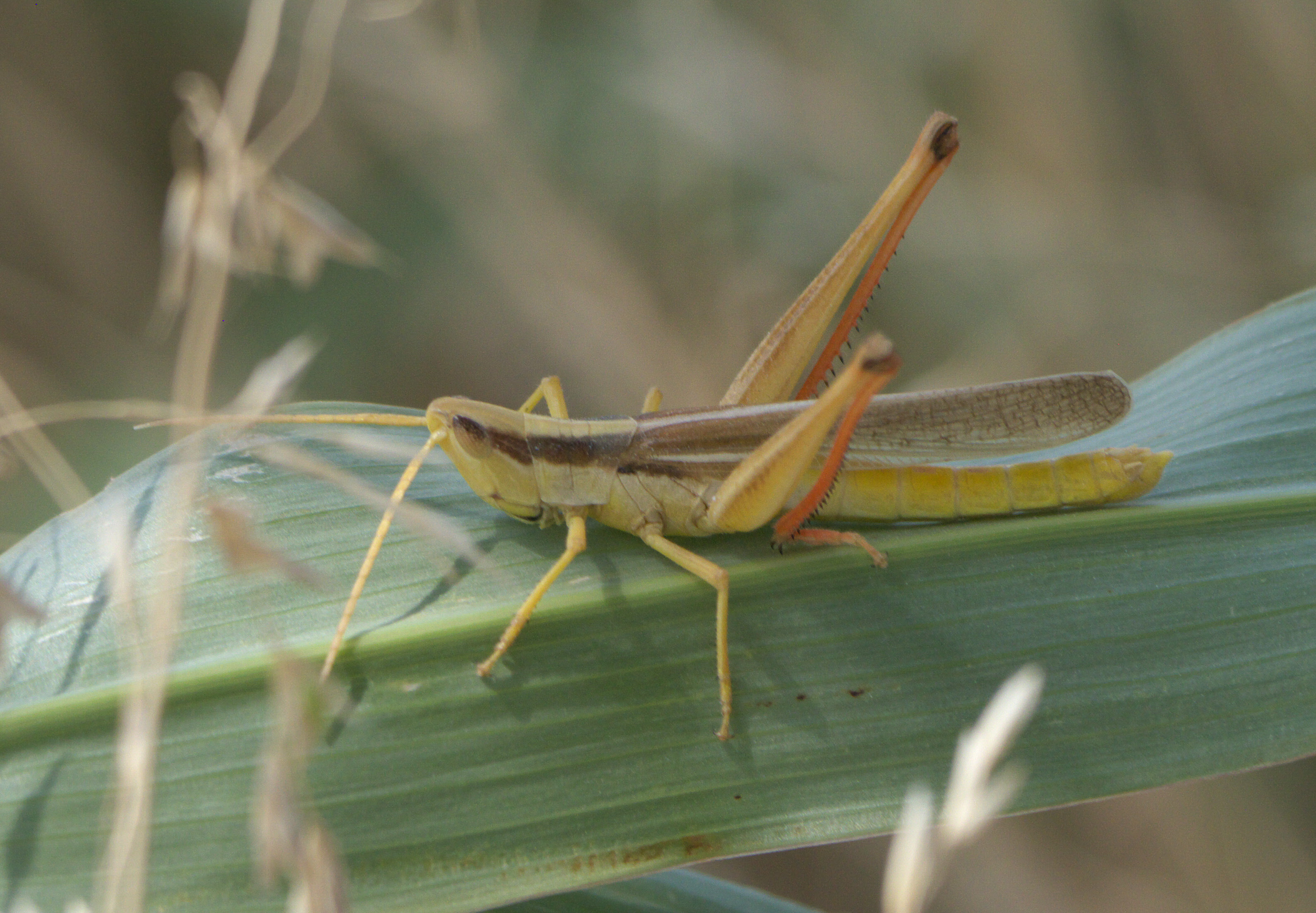
Mermiria sp.

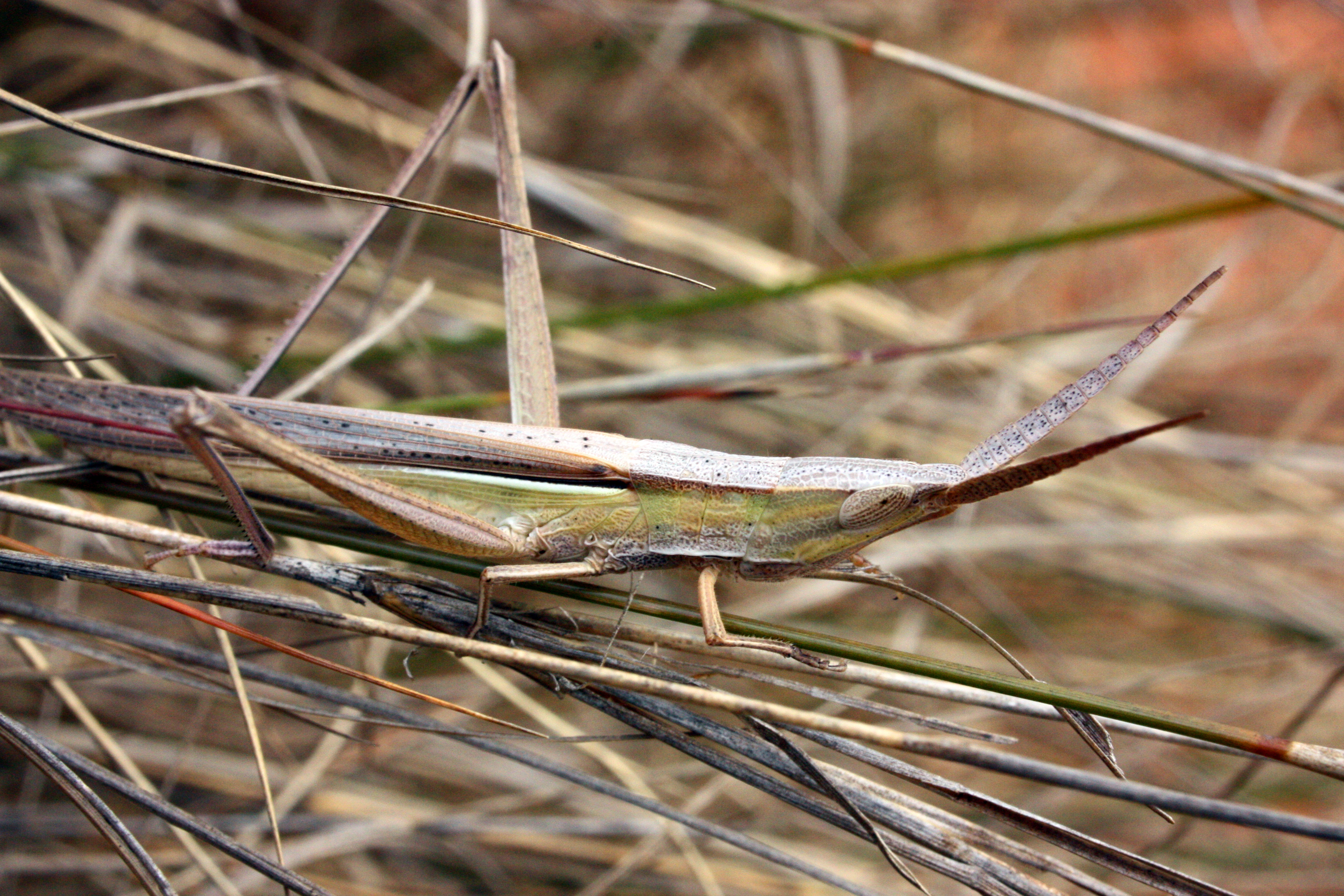
Achurum carinatum

Auth. Brunner von Wattenwyl, 1893 - North America

1. Achurum Saussure, 1861
2. Mermiria Stål, 1873
3. Pseudopomala Morse, 1896

=== Ochrilidiini ===
Auth. Brunner von Wattenwyl, 1893; distribution: Africa, southern Europe, Asia through to West Malesia and Japan.

1. Gonista Bolívar, 1898
2. Kirmania Uvarov, 1933
3. Ochrilidia Stål, 1873
4. Oxypterna Ramme, 1952

=== Tribes O ===
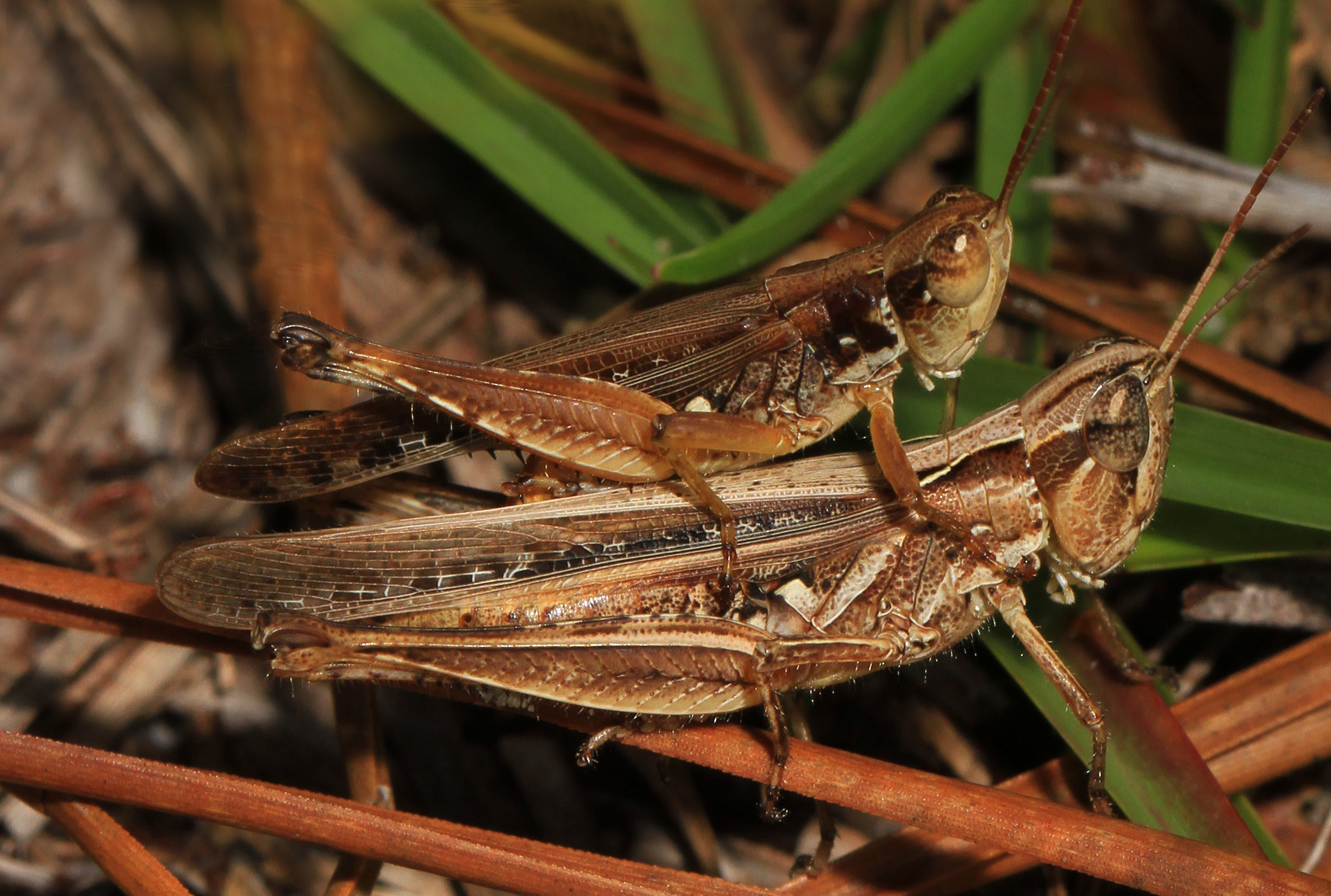
Orphulella pelidna (Orphulellini)

- Orinhippini Yin, Xia et al., (monotypic) central Asia
  - Orinhippus Uvarov, 1921
- Orphulellini Otte, 1979 - Americas
  - Dichromorpha Morse, 1896
  - Laplatacris Rehn, 1939
  - Orphulella Giglio-Tos, 1894
  - Orphulina Giglio-Tos, 1894

=== Tribe and genus group P ===
- Pacrini Zhang, Zhang & Yin, 2012 [temporary name]
  - Pacris Zhang, Zhang & Yin, 2012
- Paropomala genus group
  - Cordillacris Rehn, 1901
  - Paropomala Scudder, 1899
  - Prorocorypha Rehn, 1911

=== Ramburiellini ===
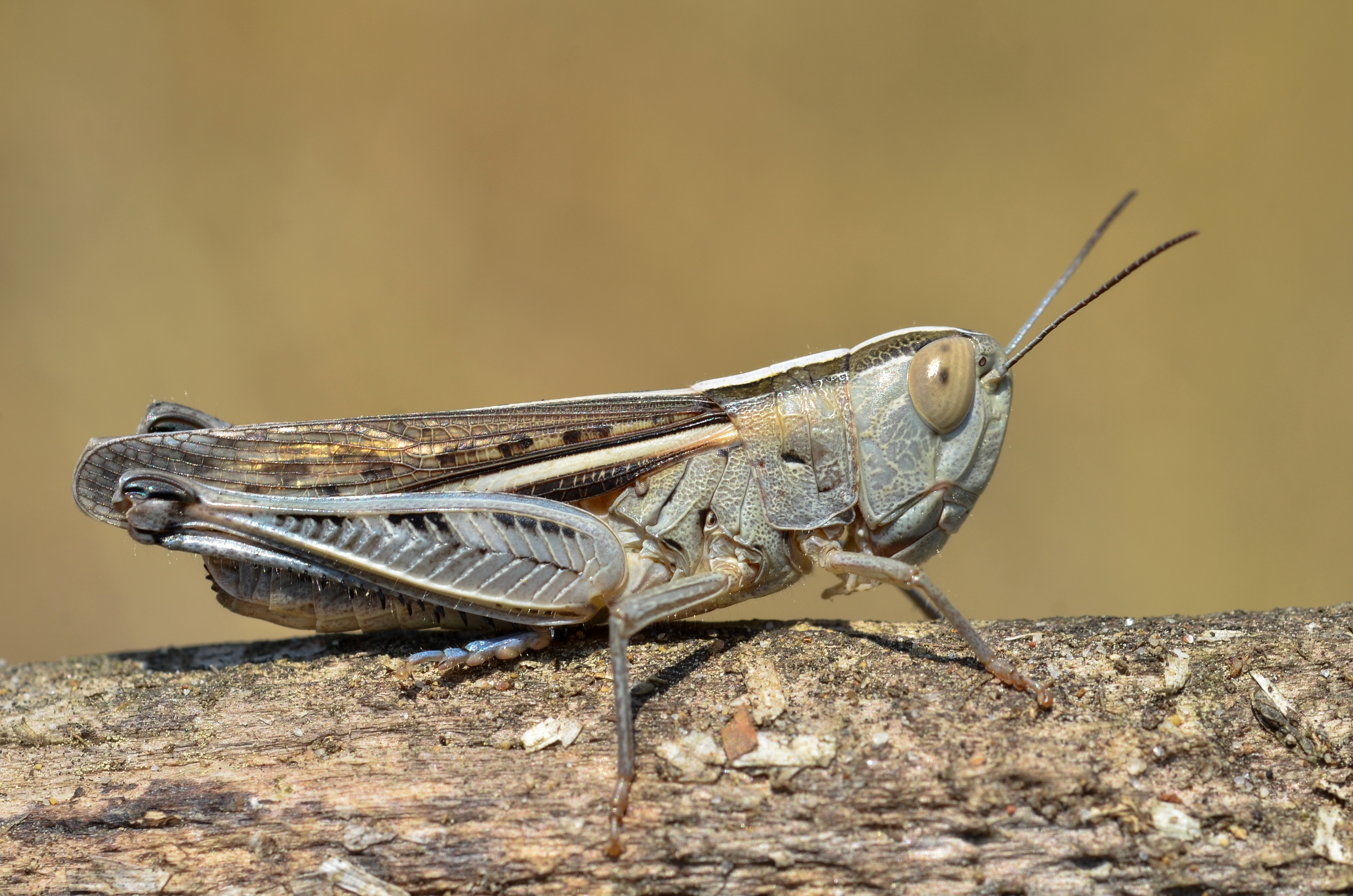
Ramburiella hispanica

Auth.: Defaut, 2012 - monotypic tribe: Africa, Europe, and Asia

- Ramburiella Bolívar, 1906

=== Scyllinini ===
Auth.: Brunner von Wattenwyl, 1893 - Central and South America

1. Alota Bruner, 1913
2. Borellia Rehn, 1906
3. Carrascotettix Carbonell, 1995
4. Cauratettix Roberts, 1937
5. Euplectrotettix Bruner, 1900
6. Jagomphocerus Carbonell, 1995
7. Meloscirtus Bruner, 1906
8. Parapellopedon Jago, 1971
9. Pellopedon Bruner, 1911
10. Rhammatocerus Saussure, 1861
11. Scyllinula Carbonell, 1995
12. Stereotettix Rehn, 1906

=== Stenobothrini ===
Auth.: Harz, 1975 - Palaeartic

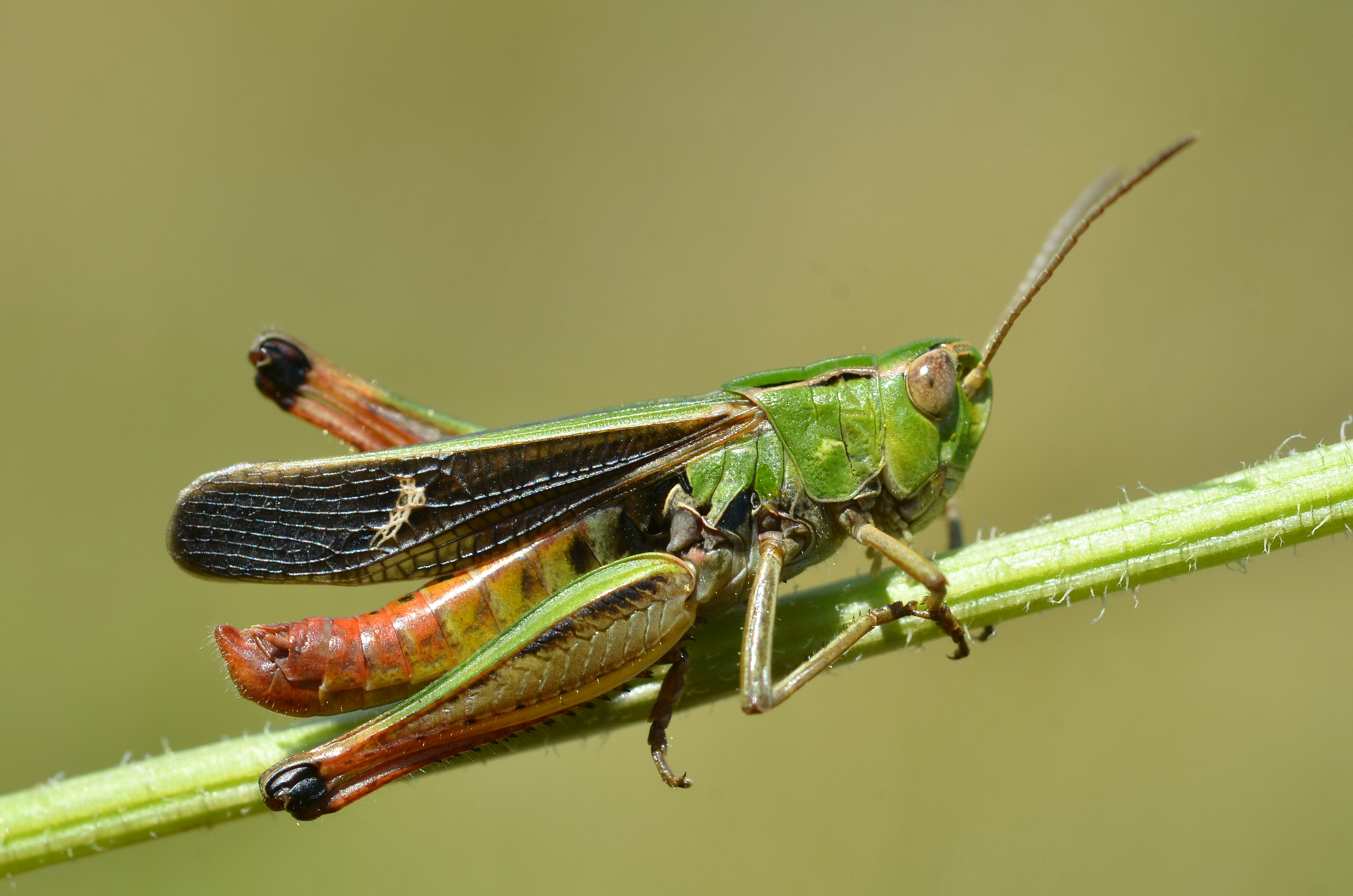
Stenobothrus lineatus male

1. Megaulacobothrus Caudell, 1921
2. Omocestus Bolívar, 1878
3. Stenobothrus Fischer, 1853

=== Tribe not determined ===
- Acantherus Scudder & Cockerell, 1902
- Acocksacris Dirsh, 1958
- Amesotropis Karsch, 1893
- Anablepia Uvarov, 1938
- Azarea Uvarov, 1926
- Baidoceracris Chopard, 1947
- Brachycrotaphus Krauss, 1877
- Brainia Uvarov, 1922
- Carinulaenotus Yin, 1982
- Catabothrus Uvarov, 1962
- Chrysacris Zheng, 1983
- Chrysochraoides Ren et al., 1993
- Cophohippus Uvarov, 1953
- Dhimbama Henry, 1940
- Diablepia Kirby, 1902
- Dianacris Yin, 1983
- Dnopherula Karsch, 1896
- Eleutherotheca Karny, 1907
- Ermia Popov, 1957
- Esselenia Hebard, 1920
- Faureia Uvarov, 1921
- Gelastorhinus Brunner von Wattenwyl, 1893
- Inyangana Naskrecki, 1992
- Italohippus Fontana & La Greca, 1999
- Karruhippus Brown, 1989
- Komandia Uvarov, 1953
- Kraussella Bolívar, 1909
- Leurohippus Uvarov, 1940
- Lounsburyna Uvarov, 1922
- Macrokangacris Yin, 1983
- Madurea Bolívar, 1902
- Malagasippus Descamps & Wintrebert, 1966
- Megafrohippus Jago, 1996
- Melinohippus Jago, 1996
- Mesopsis Bolívar, 1906
- Minihippus Jago, 1996
- Neoleva Jago, 1996
- Ovambohippus Brown, 1972
- Paragonista Willemse, 1932
- Paragymnobothrus Karny, 1910
- Pegasidion Saussure, 1861
- Phonogaster Henry, 1940
- Platypternodes Bolívar, 1908
- Pnorisa Stål, 1861
- Primnia Stål, 1873
- Pseudegnatius Dirsh, 1956
- Pseudoberengueria Jago, 1996
- Pseudogmothela Karny, 1910
- Pseudoleva Jago, 1996
- Pusillarolium Zheng, 1999
- Quangula Uvarov, 1953
- Rammeihippus Woznessenskij, 1996
- Salariacris Descamps & Wintrebert, 1966
- Sporobolius Uvarov, 1941
- Squamopenna Lian & Zheng, 1984
- Stenohippus Uvarov, 1926
- Tanalanacris Descamps & Wintrebert, 1966
- Thyridota Uvarov, 1925
- Tinaria Stål, 1861
- Unalia Koçak & Kemal, 2008
- Xenocheila Uvarov, 1933
