= D. elegans =

D. elegans may refer to:

- Dacryopinax elegans, a jelly fungus species
- Damias elegans, a moth species
- Deinacrida elegans, a weta species
- Dendronotus elegans, a sea slug species
- Dendropsophus elegans, a frog species endemic to Brazil
- Diaphania elegans, a moth species
- Dichomeris elegans, a moth species
- Dichromorpha elegans, the short-winged grasshopper, an insect species
- Dicranurus elegans, a Lower Devonian lichid trilobites species
- †Diegocanis elegans, a cynodont species from the Triassic of Argentina
- Dilophodes elegans, a moth species
- Ditha elegans, a pseudoscorpion species in the genus Ditha found in Indonesia
- Dolbina elegans, a moth species
- Dolichoderus elegans, an extinct ant species
- Dolomedes elegans, a spider species
- Dorcadion elegans, a longhorn beetle species
- Dorymyrmex elegans, an ant species
- Dosinia elegans, a bivalve mollusc species
- Downingia elegans, a flowering plant species
- Drosophila elegans, a fly species found in Taiwan and the Philippines
- Drupa elegans, a sea snail species
- Dynoides elegans, an isopod species found in California

== Synonyms ==
- Dendrobium elegans, a synonym for Crocodeilanthe elegans, an orchid species
- Dendroclavella elegans, a synonym for Clavelina elegans, a tunicate species
- Drotus elegans, a synonym for Calliprason elegans, a beetle species found in New Zealand
