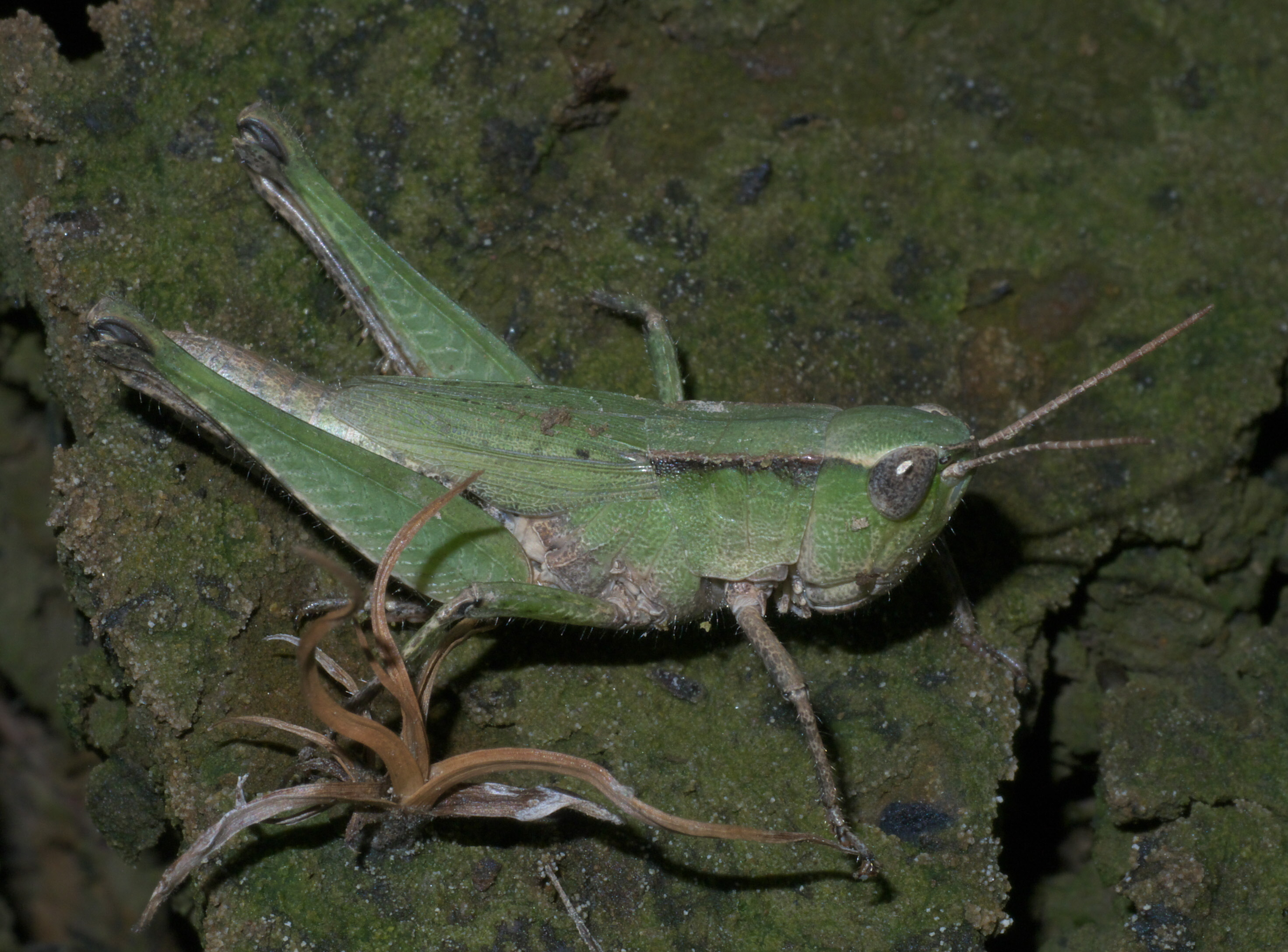
- Dichromorpha viridis

Scientific classification
- Kingdom: Animalia
- Phylum: Arthropoda
- Clade: Pancrustacea
- Class: Insecta
- Order: Orthoptera
- Suborder: Caelifera
- Family: Acrididae
- Subfamily: Gomphocerinae
- Tribe: Orphulellini; Otte, 1979

Genera
- 4, see text.

= Orphulellini =

Tribe of grasshoppers

Orphulellini is a tribe of grasshoppers of the family Acrididae found in the Americas.

== Genera ==
- Dichromorpha Morse, 1896
- Laplatacris Rehn, 1939
- Orphulella Giglio-Tos, 1894
- Orphulina Giglio-Tos, 1894
