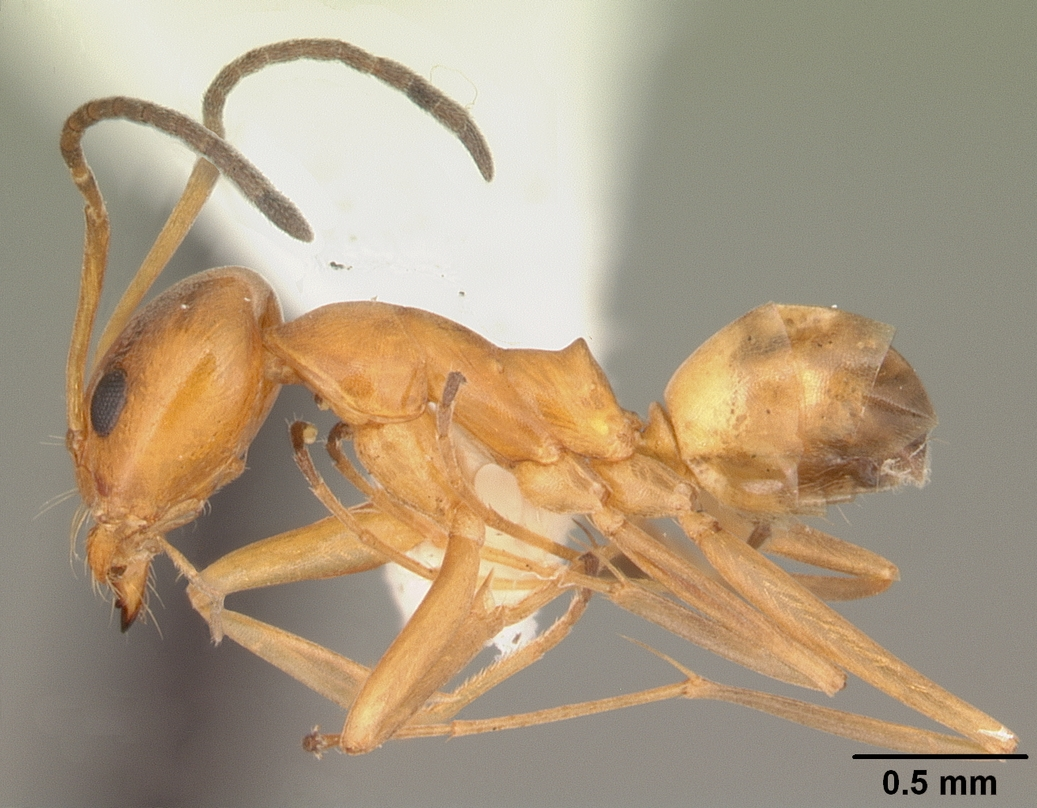
- D. bureni worker

Scientific classification
- Kingdom: Animalia
- Phylum: Arthropoda
- Clade: Pancrustacea
- Class: Insecta
- Order: Hymenoptera
- Family: Formicidae
- Subfamily: Dolichoderinae
- Genus: Dorymyrmex
- Species: D. bureni

Binomial name
- Dorymyrmex bureni (Trager, 1988)

= Dorymyrmex bureni =

Species of ant

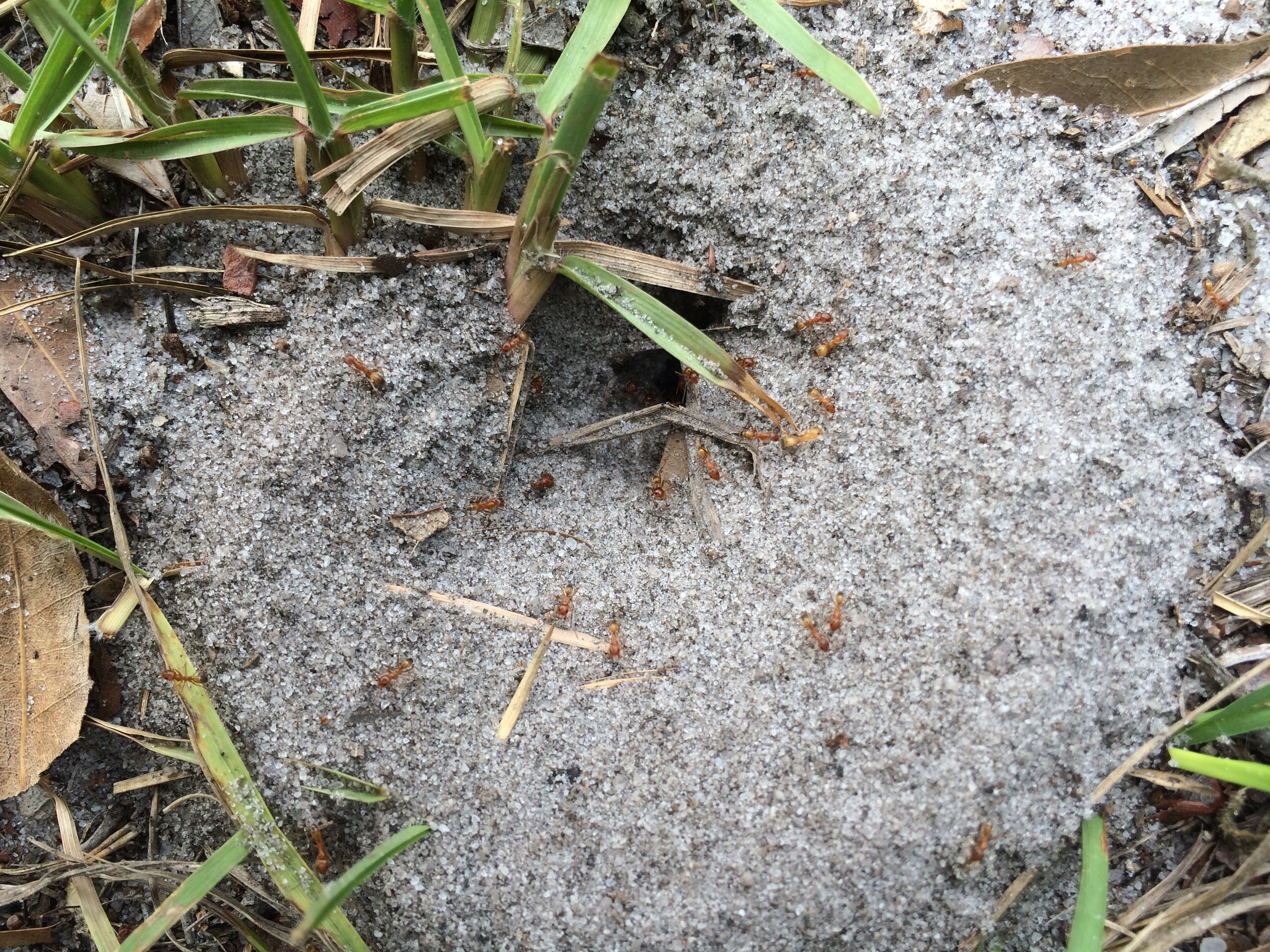
D. bureni nest

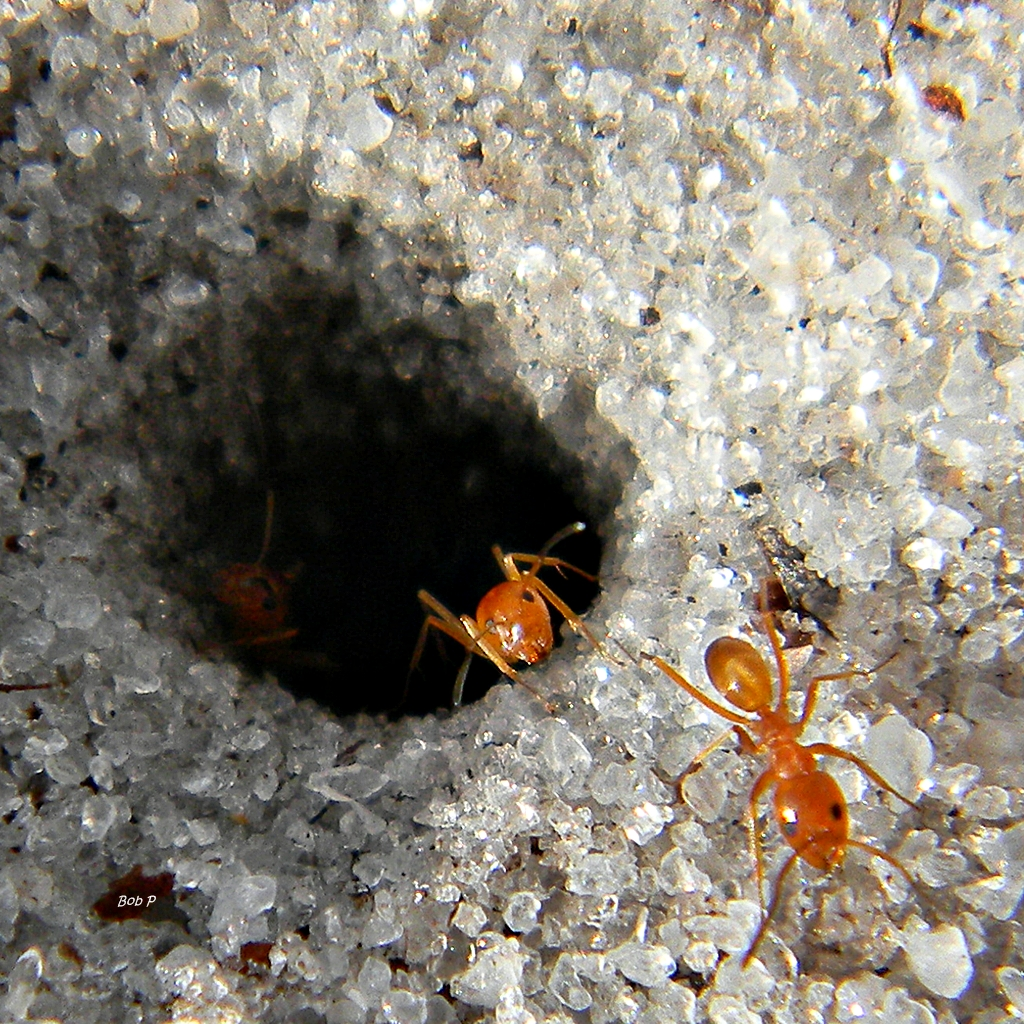

Dorymyrmex bureni, also known as Buren's pyramid ant, is a species of ant in the genus Dorymyrmex. Described by Trager in 1988, the species is endemic to the United States. Pyramid ants are medium-sized ants, ranging from 2–4 mm. They are light orange in color and fast moving. Unlike other ant species in the area like the red imported fire ant (Solenopsis invicta), this species is relatively harmless to humans and unable to sting. The workers have a foul smelling coconut odor when crushed. Dorymyrmex bureni hunt living insects, even other winged ants. They also search for sap-sucking insects from which they collect honeydew. On the head of these ants are curved hairs, used for transporting beads of damp sand. Colonies are small. Nests usually have a single entrance with a mound of sand shaped like a crater. Dorymyrmex bureni prefer sandy soil. This species of ant is not an indoor pest, and the use of pesticides to control them is not necessary. They are found throughout the southeastern United States.

== Distribution ==
This species is almost entirely restricted to the Atlantic Coastal Plain, with populations extending to just outside the coastal plain in Alabama and Georgia. The latitudinal range is continuous from the Florida Keys along the American east coast to coastal New Jersey. There are disagreements in literature as to the westernmost extend of D. bureni populations, with some sources claiming Mississippi and others claiming eastern Texas. Modern verifiable records seem to stop around the Mississippi River. The disagreement on the westernmost extent of its range is likely due to the presence of the similar species Dorymyrmex flavus having a distribution that either borders or overlaps directly to the west of the range of D. bureni.

Dorymyrmex bureni is also introduced to the manmade island of Ocean Cay in the Bahamas.
