= Dorymyrmex tener =

Scientific classification
- Domain: Eukaryota
- Kingdom: Animalia
- Phylum: Arthropoda
- Class: Insecta
- Order: Hymenoptera
- Family: Formicidae
- Subfamily: Dolichoderinae
- Genus: Dorymyrmex
- Species: D. tener

Binomial name
- Dorymyrmex tener Mayr, 1868

Subspecies
- Dorymyrmex tener donisthorpei Santschi, 1936

Species of ant

Dorymyrmex tener is a species of ant in the genus Dorymyrmex. Described by Gustav Mayr in 1868, the species is endemic to Argentina and Chile.
