= Dorymyrmex silvestrii =

Scientific classification
- Domain: Eukaryota
- Kingdom: Animalia
- Phylum: Arthropoda
- Class: Insecta
- Order: Hymenoptera
- Family: Formicidae
- Subfamily: Dolichoderinae
- Genus: Dorymyrmex
- Species: D. silvestrii

Binomial name
- Dorymyrmex silvestrii Gallardo, 1916

Species of ant

Dorymyrmex silvestrii is a species of ant in the genus Dorymyrmex. Described by Gallardo in 1916, the species is endemic to Argentina.
