= Dorymyrmex baeri =

Scientific classification
- Domain: Eukaryota
- Kingdom: Animalia
- Phylum: Arthropoda
- Class: Insecta
- Order: Hymenoptera
- Family: Formicidae
- Subfamily: Dolichoderinae
- Genus: Dorymyrmex
- Species: D. baeri

Binomial name
- Dorymyrmex baeri André, 1903

Species of ant

Dorymyrmex baeri is a species of ant in the genus Dorymyrmex. Described by André in 1903, the species is endemic to Argentina.
