= Dorymyrmex tuberosus =

Scientific classification
- Domain: Eukaryota
- Kingdom: Animalia
- Phylum: Arthropoda
- Class: Insecta
- Order: Hymenoptera
- Family: Formicidae
- Subfamily: Dolichoderinae
- Genus: Dorymyrmex
- Species: D. tuberosus

Binomial name
- Dorymyrmex tuberosus Cuezzo & Guerrero, 2011

Species of ant

Dorymyrmex tuberosus is a species of ant in the genus Dorymyrmex. Described by Cuezzo and Guerrero in 2011, the species is endemic to Colombia.
