= Dorymyrmex reginicula =

Scientific classification
- Kingdom: Animalia
- Phylum: Arthropoda
- Class: Insecta
- Order: Hymenoptera
- Family: Formicidae
- Subfamily: Dolichoderinae
- Genus: Dorymyrmex
- Species: D. reginicula

Binomial name
- Dorymyrmex reginicula (Trager, 1988)

Synonyms
- Conomyrma reginicula Trager, 1988

Species of ant

Dorymyrmex reginicula is a species of ant in the genus Dorymyrmex. Described by Trager in 1988, the species is endemic to the United States.
