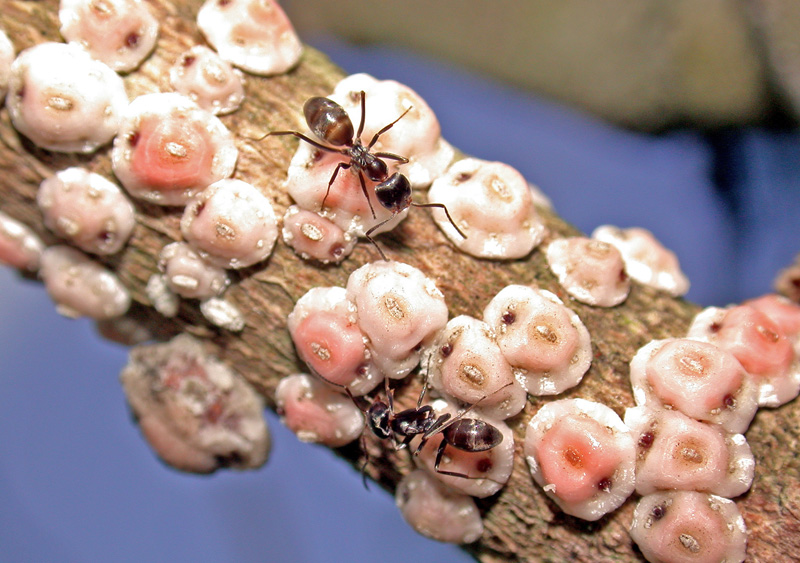
- D. brunneus tending scale insects for honeydew

Scientific classification
- Domain: Eukaryota
- Kingdom: Animalia
- Phylum: Arthropoda
- Class: Insecta
- Order: Hymenoptera
- Family: Formicidae
- Subfamily: Dolichoderinae
- Tribe: Leptomyrmecini
- Genus: Dorymyrmex; Mayr, 1866

Type species
- Dorymyrmex flavescens Mayr, 1866

Diversity
- 60 species

Synonyms
- Ammomyrma Santschi, 1922; Araucomyrmex Gallardo, 1919; Biconomyrma Kusnezov, 1952; Conomyrma Forel, 1913; Psammomyrma Forel, 1912; Spinomyrma Kusnezov, 1952

= Dorymyrmex =

Genus of ants

Dorymyrmex (also known as cone ants or pyramid ants) is a genus of ants in the subfamily Dolichoderinae.

== Distribution and habitat ==
This genus has a strictly American distribution, inhabiting in the Nearctic and Neotropical regions and containing 60 species, several undescribed. Despite being considered by many ant collectors as "road side weeds", several species of Dorymyrmex shown a high degree of endemicity, specialized habitat preferences, and varied population structure. Some species may serve as potential agents of biological control of annual crop pests. Species of Dorymyrmex nest preferentially in dry or disturbed habitats, generally in soil without vegetation cover. Several species are known to attend aphids and other hemipterous insects. Such behavior is common in other Dolichoderinae genera and related subfamilies.

== Species ==
- Dorymyrmex agallardoi Snelling, 1975
- Dorymyrmex alboniger Forel, 1914
- Dorymyrmex amazonicus Cuezzo & Guerrero, 2011
- Dorymyrmex antarcticus Forel, 1904
- Dorymyrmex antillana Snelling, 2005
- Dorymyrmex baeri André, 1903
- Dorymyrmex bicolor Wheeler, 1906
- Dorymyrmex biconis Forel, 1912
- Dorymyrmex bituber Santschi, 1916
- Dorymyrmex bossutus (Trager, 1988)
- Dorymyrmex breviscapis Forel, 1912
- Dorymyrmex bruchi Forel, 1912
- Dorymyrmex brunneus Forel, 1908
- Dorymyrmex bureni (Trager, 1988)
- Dorymyrmex carettei Forel, 1913
- Dorymyrmex caretteoides Forel, 1914
- Dorymyrmex chilensis Forel, 1911
- Dorymyrmex confusus (Kusnezov, 1952)
- Dorymyrmex coniculus Santschi, 1922
- Dorymyrmex ebeninus Forel, 1914
- Dorymyrmex elegans (Trager, 1988)
- Dorymyrmex emmaericaellus Kusnezov, 1951
- Dorymyrmex ensifer Forel, 1912
- Dorymyrmex exsanguis Forel, 1912
- Dorymyrmex flavescens Mayr, 1866
- Dorymyrmex flavopectus Smith, 1944
- Dorymyrmex flavus [no authors], 1879
- Dorymyrmex fusculus Santschi, 1922
- Dorymyrmex goeldii Forel, 1904
- Dorymyrmex goetschi Goetsch, 1933
- Dorymyrmex grandulus (Forel, 1922)
- Dorymyrmex hunti (Snelling, 1975)
- Dorymyrmex hypocritus (Snelling, 1975)
- Dorymyrmex incomptus (Snelling, 1975)
- Dorymyrmex insanus (Buckley, 1866)
- Dorymyrmex jheringi Forel, 1912
- Dorymyrmex joergenseni Bruch, 1917
- Dorymyrmex lipan Snelling, 1995
- Dorymyrmex minutus Emery, 1895
- Dorymyrmex morenoi Bruch, 1921
- Dorymyrmex paiute Snelling, 1995
- Dorymyrmex pappodes (Snelling, 1975)
- Dorymyrmex paranensis Santschi, 1922
- Dorymyrmex planidens Mayr, 1868
- Dorymyrmex pogonius (Snelling, 1975)
- Dorymyrmex pulchellus Santschi, 1922
- Dorymyrmex pyramicus (Roger, 1863)
- Dorymyrmex reginicula (Trager, 1988)
- Dorymyrmex richteri Forel, 1911
- Dorymyrmex santschii Gallardo, 1917
- Dorymyrmex silvestrii Gallardo, 1916
- Dorymyrmex smithi Cole, 1936
- Dorymyrmex spurius Santschi, 1929
- Dorymyrmex steigeri Santschi, 1912
- Dorymyrmex tener Mayr, 1868
- Dorymyrmex thoracicus Gallardo, 1916
- Dorymyrmex tuberosus Cuezzo & Guerrero, 2011
- Dorymyrmex wheeleri (Kusnezov, 1952)
- Dorymyrmex wolffhuegeli Forel, 1911
- Dorymyrmex xerophylus Cuezzo & Guerrero, 2011
