= Dorymyrmex pulchellus =

Scientific classification
- Domain: Eukaryota
- Kingdom: Animalia
- Phylum: Arthropoda
- Class: Insecta
- Order: Hymenoptera
- Family: Formicidae
- Subfamily: Dolichoderinae
- Genus: Dorymyrmex
- Species: D. pulchellus

Binomial name
- Dorymyrmex pulchellus Santschi, 1922

Species of ant

Dorymyrmex pulchellus is a species of ant in the genus Dorymyrmex. Described by Felix Santschi in 1922, the species is endemic to Argentina.
