= Dorymyrmex bruchi =

Scientific classification
- Domain: Eukaryota
- Kingdom: Animalia
- Phylum: Arthropoda
- Class: Insecta
- Order: Hymenoptera
- Family: Formicidae
- Subfamily: Dolichoderinae
- Genus: Dorymyrmex
- Species: D. bruchi

Binomial name
- Dorymyrmex bruchi Forel, 1912

Species of ant

Dorymyrmex bruchi is a species of ant in the genus Dorymyrmex. Described by Forel in 1912, the species is endemic to Argentina.
