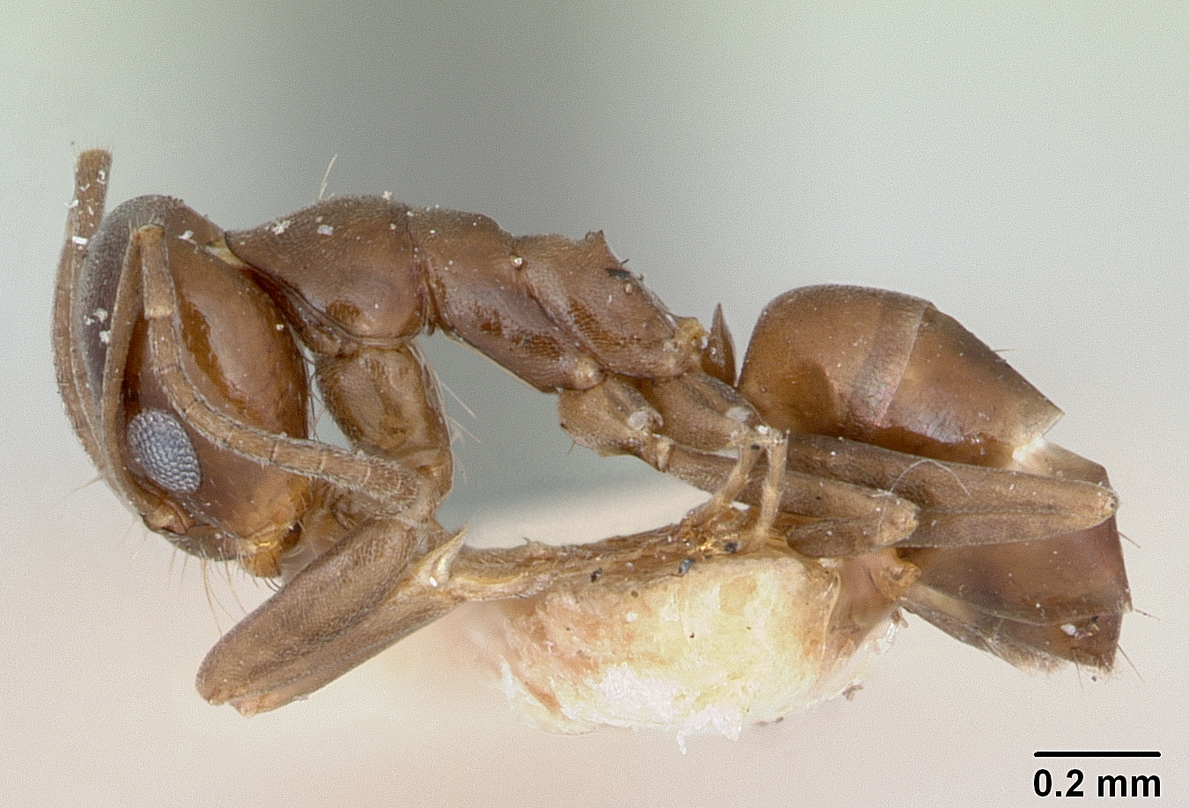

Scientific classification
- Domain: Eukaryota
- Kingdom: Animalia
- Phylum: Arthropoda
- Class: Insecta
- Order: Hymenoptera
- Family: Formicidae
- Subfamily: Dolichoderinae
- Genus: Dorymyrmex
- Species: D. wheeleri

Binomial name
- Dorymyrmex wheeleri (Kusnezov, 1952)

= Dorymyrmex wheeleri =

Species of ant

Dorymyrmex wheeleri is a species of ant in the genus Dorymyrmex. Described by Kusnezov in 1952, the species is endemic to the United States.
