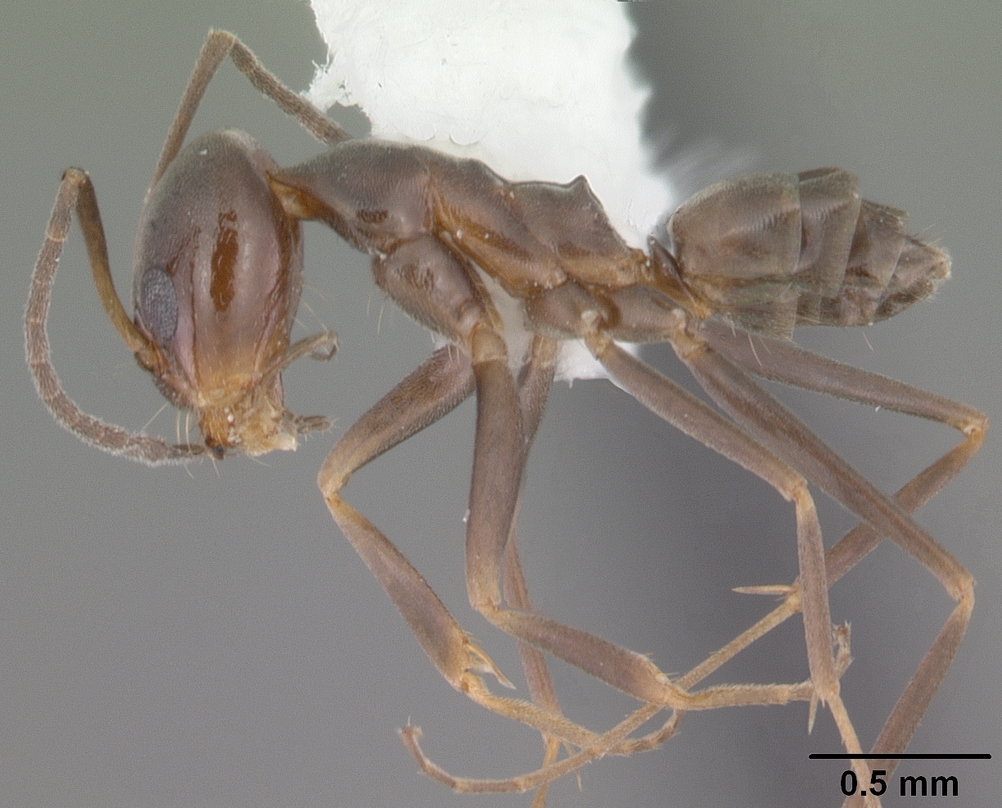

Scientific classification
- Kingdom: Animalia
- Phylum: Arthropoda
- Class: Insecta
- Order: Hymenoptera
- Family: Formicidae
- Subfamily: Dolichoderinae
- Genus: Dorymyrmex
- Species: D. grandulus

Binomial name
- Dorymyrmex grandulus (Forel, 1922)

= Dorymyrmex grandulus =

Species of ant

Dorymyrmex grandulus, known as the great cone ant, is a species of ant in the genus Dorymyrmex. Described by Forel in 1922, the species is endemic to the United States.
