= Dorymyrmex joergenseni =

Scientific classification
- Domain: Eukaryota
- Kingdom: Animalia
- Phylum: Arthropoda
- Class: Insecta
- Order: Hymenoptera
- Family: Formicidae
- Subfamily: Dolichoderinae
- Genus: Dorymyrmex
- Species: D. joergenseni

Binomial name
- Dorymyrmex joergenseni Bruch, 1917

Species of ant

Dorymyrmex joergenseni is a species of ant in the genus Dorymyrmex. Described by Bruch in 1917, the species is endemic to Argentina.
