= Dorymyrmex flavescens =

Scientific classification
- Domain: Eukaryota
- Kingdom: Animalia
- Phylum: Arthropoda
- Class: Insecta
- Order: Hymenoptera
- Family: Formicidae
- Subfamily: Dolichoderinae
- Genus: Dorymyrmex
- Species: D. flavescens

Binomial name
- Dorymyrmex flavescens Mayr, 1866

Subspecies
- Dorymyrmex flavescens jactans Santschi, 1916; Dorymyrmex flavescens mandibularis Santschi, 1925

Synonyms
- Dorymyrmex mucronatus Emery, 1906

Species of ant

Dorymyrmex flavescens is a species of ant in the genus Dorymyrmex. Described by Gustav Mayr in 1866, the species is endemic to Argentina.
