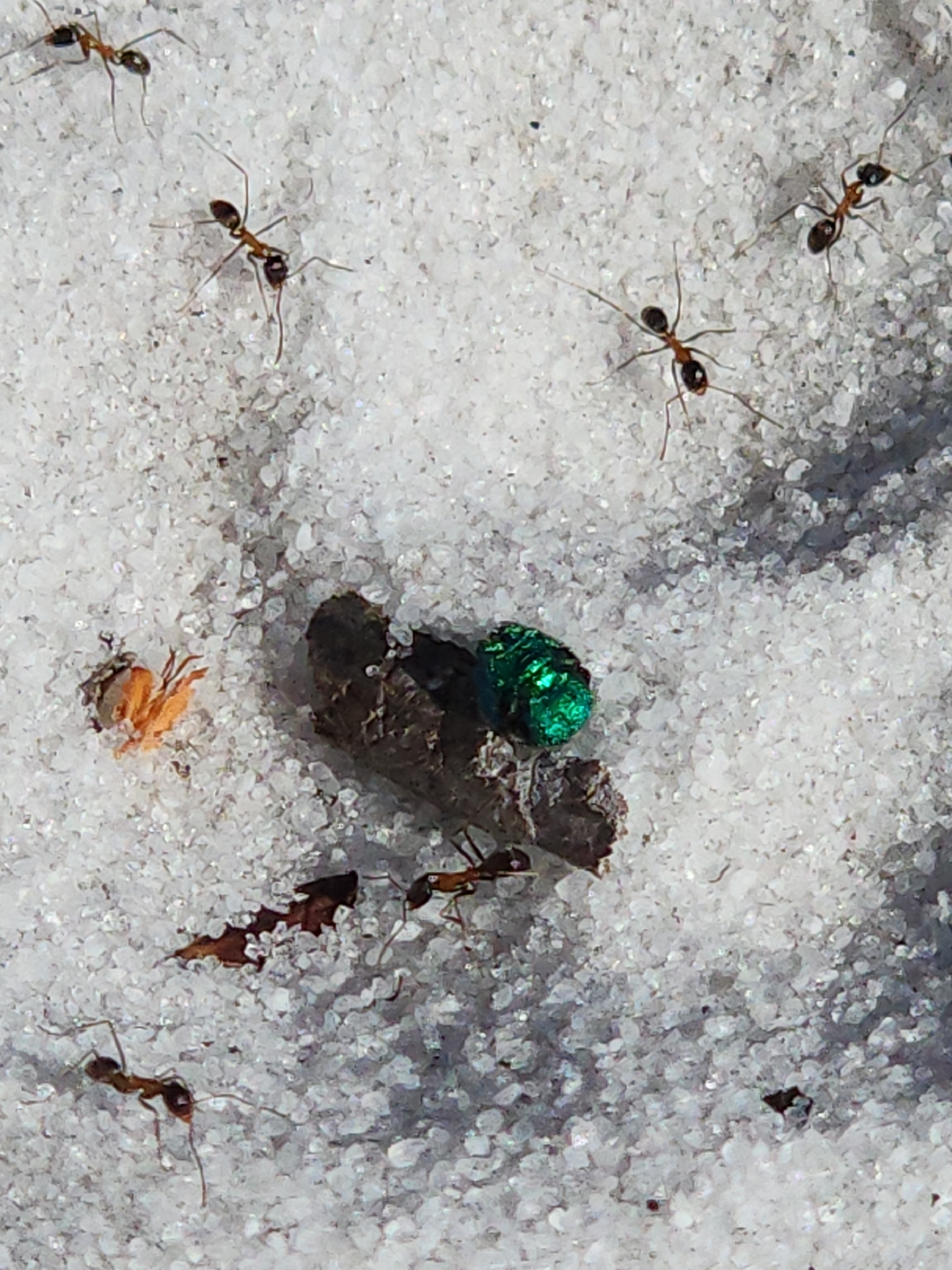
- Workers foraging in white sand scrub habitat
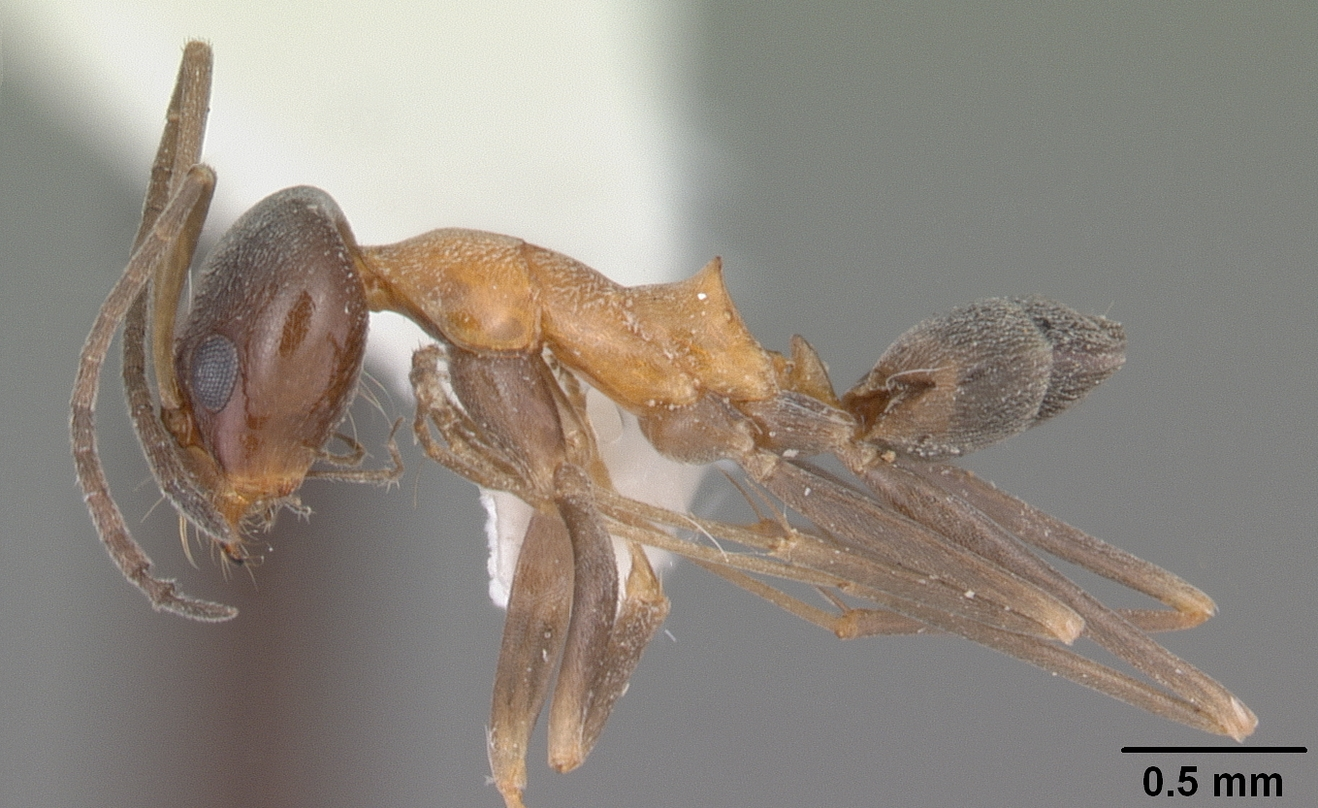
- Collected specimen

Conservation status
- Imperiled (NatureServe)

Scientific classification
- Kingdom: Animalia
- Phylum: Arthropoda
- Class: Insecta
- Order: Hymenoptera
- Family: Formicidae
- Subfamily: Dolichoderinae
- Genus: Dorymyrmex
- Species: D. flavopectus

Binomial name
- Dorymyrmex flavopectus Smith, M.R., 1944

= Dorymyrmex flavopectus =

Species of ant

Dorymyrmex flavopectus is a species of ant in the genus Dorymyrmex described by Smith in 1944. It is endemic to the US state of Florida, where it is only found in scrub habitat.
