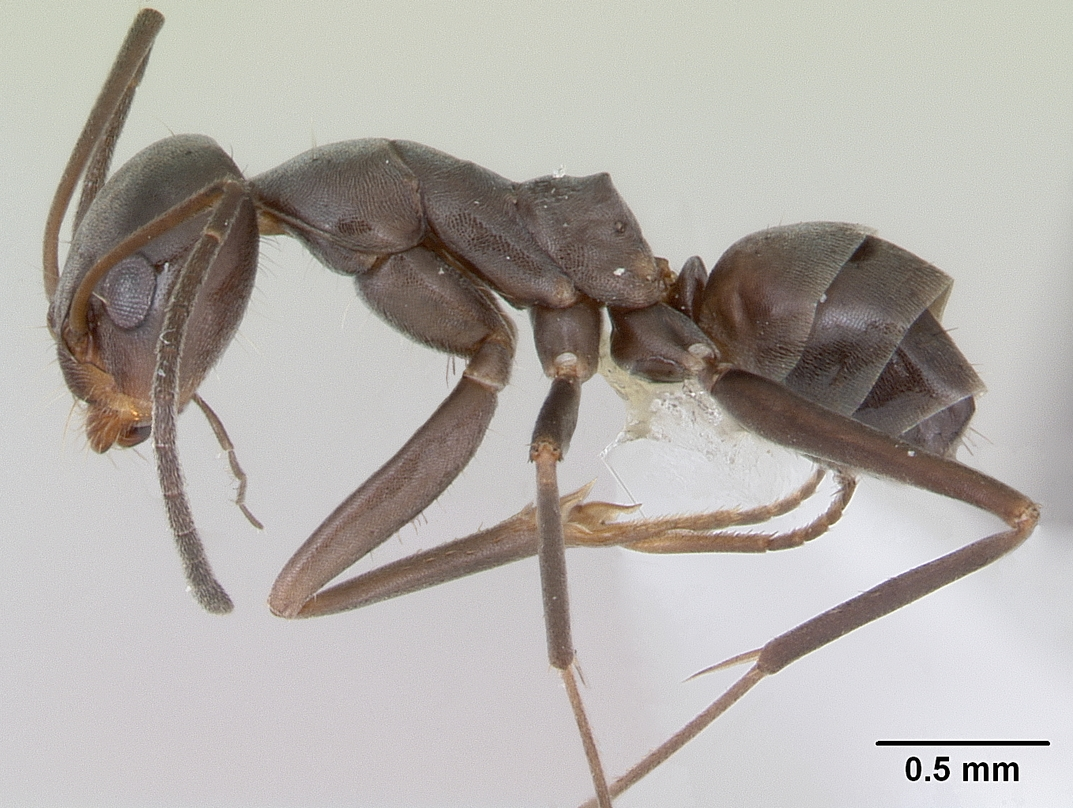

Scientific classification
- Domain: Eukaryota
- Kingdom: Animalia
- Phylum: Arthropoda
- Class: Insecta
- Order: Hymenoptera
- Family: Formicidae
- Subfamily: Dolichoderinae
- Genus: Dorymyrmex
- Species: D. jheringi

Binomial name
- Dorymyrmex jheringi Forel, 1912

= Dorymyrmex jheringi =

Species of ant

Dorymyrmex jheringi is a species of ant in the genus Dorymyrmex. Described by Forel in 1912, the species is endemic to Brazil and Paraguay.
