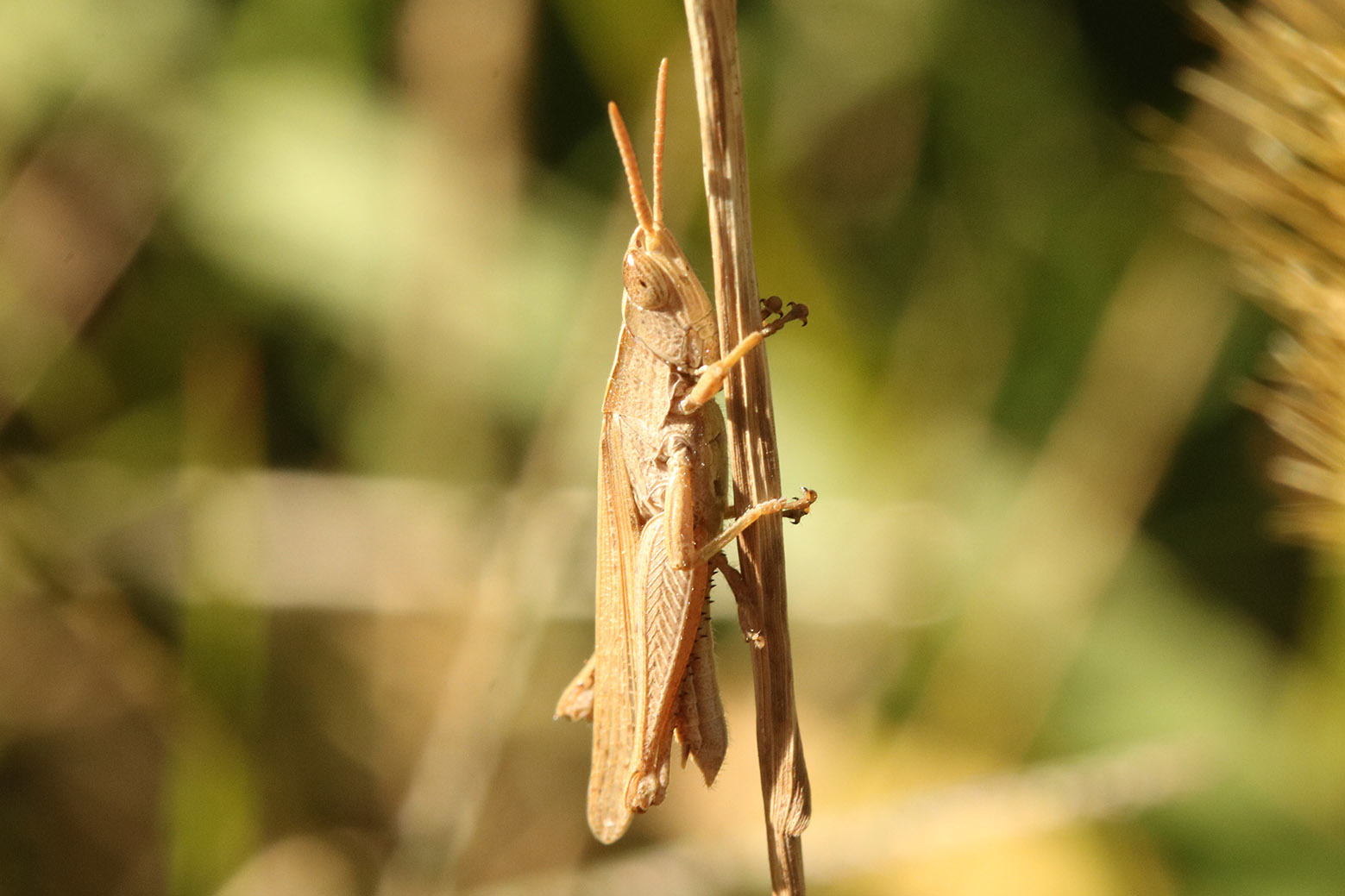
- Laplatacris dispar, Argentina

Scientific classification
- Kingdom: Animalia
- Phylum: Arthropoda
- Clade: Pancrustacea
- Class: Insecta
- Order: Orthoptera
- Suborder: Caelifera
- Family: Acrididae
- Tribe: Orphulellini
- Genus: Laplatacris; Rehn, 1939
- Species: L. dispar

Binomial name
- Laplatacris dispar Rehn, 1939

= Laplatacris =

Genus of grasshoppers

Laplatacris is a genus of slant-faced grasshoppers in the family Acrididae. There is one described species in Laplatacris, L. dispar, found in South America. Laplatacris's nymphal mortality is mostly a result of polyphagous spiders, while Laplatacris's adult mortality is predominantly caused by predators and parasites.
