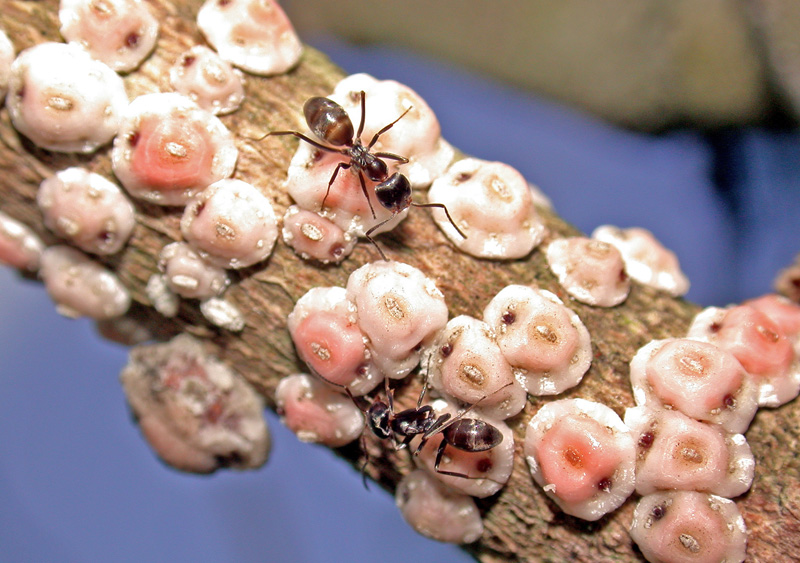
- workers tending scale insects for honeydew

Scientific classification
- Domain: Eukaryota
- Kingdom: Animalia
- Phylum: Arthropoda
- Class: Insecta
- Order: Hymenoptera
- Family: Formicidae
- Subfamily: Dolichoderinae
- Genus: Dorymyrmex
- Species: D. brunneus

Binomial name
- Dorymyrmex brunneus Forel, 1908

= Dorymyrmex brunneus =

Species of ant

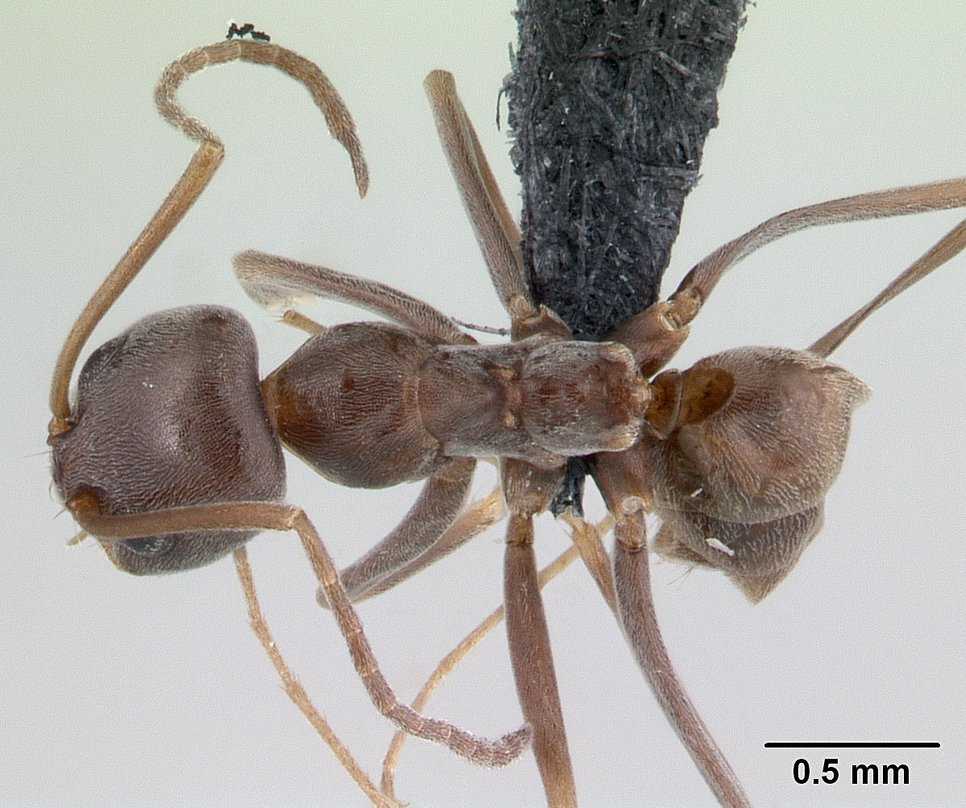
Close up of D. brunneus

Dorymyrmex brunneus is a species of ant in the genus Dorymyrmex. Described by Auguste-Henri Forel in 1908, the species is endemic to several nations in South America.
