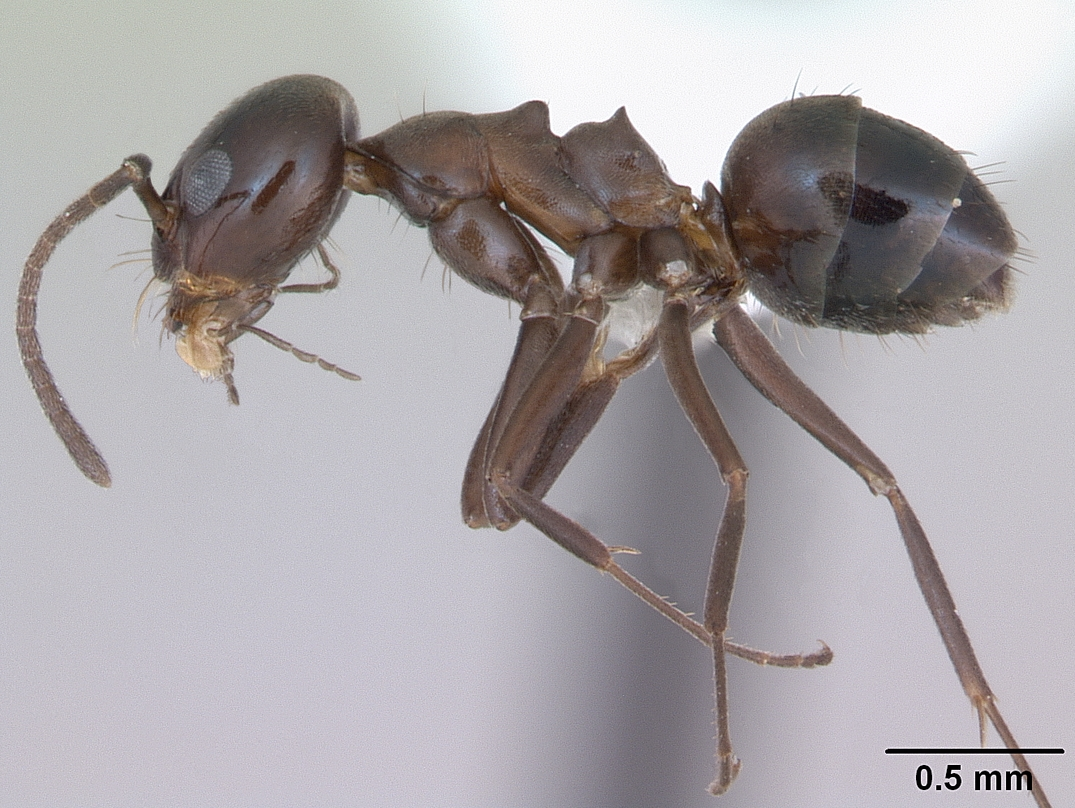

Scientific classification
- Domain: Eukaryota
- Kingdom: Animalia
- Phylum: Arthropoda
- Class: Insecta
- Order: Hymenoptera
- Family: Formicidae
- Subfamily: Dolichoderinae
- Genus: Dorymyrmex
- Species: D. bituber

Binomial name
- Dorymyrmex bituber Santschi, 1916

Subspecies
- Dorymyrmex bituber laticeps Santschi, 1919

= Dorymyrmex bituber =

Species of ant

Dorymyrmex bituber is a species of ant in the genus Dorymyrmex. Described by Felix Santschi in 1916, the species is endemic to Argentina and Paraguay.
