= Dorymyrmex richteri =

Scientific classification
- Domain: Eukaryota
- Kingdom: Animalia
- Phylum: Arthropoda
- Class: Insecta
- Order: Hymenoptera
- Family: Formicidae
- Subfamily: Dolichoderinae
- Genus: Dorymyrmex
- Species: D. richteri

Binomial name
- Dorymyrmex richteri Forel, 1911

Species of ant

Dorymyrmex richteri is a species of ant in the genus Dorymyrmex. Described by Forel in 1911, the species is endemic to Argentina.
