= Dorymyrmex incomptus =

Scientific classification
- Kingdom: Animalia
- Phylum: Arthropoda
- Class: Insecta
- Order: Hymenoptera
- Family: Formicidae
- Subfamily: Dolichoderinae
- Genus: Dorymyrmex
- Species: D. incomptus

Binomial name
- Dorymyrmex incomptus (Snelling, R.R., 1975)

Species of ant

Dorymyrmex incomptus is a species of ant in the genus Dorymyrmex. Described by Snelling in 1975, the species is endemic to Chile.
