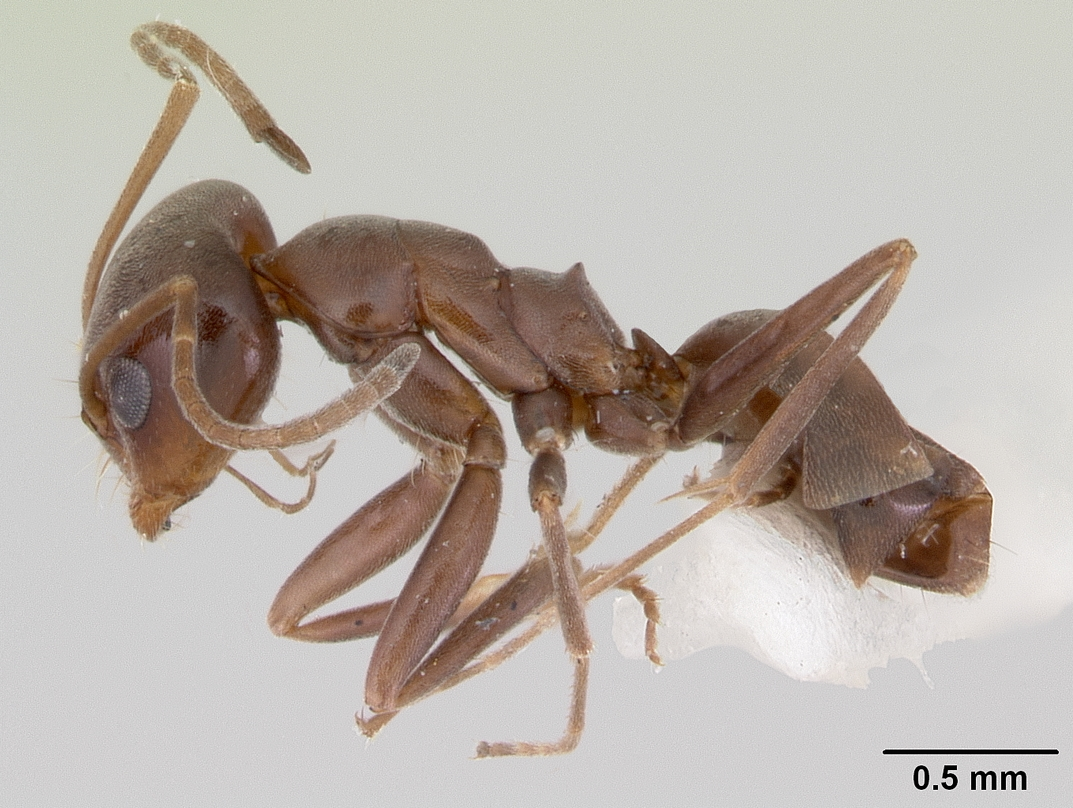
- D. smithi worker

Scientific classification
- Kingdom: Animalia
- Phylum: Arthropoda
- Clade: Pancrustacea
- Class: Insecta
- Order: Hymenoptera
- Family: Formicidae
- Subfamily: Dolichoderinae
- Genus: Dorymyrmex
- Species: D. smithi

Binomial name
- Dorymyrmex smithi Cole, 1936

Synonyms
- Conomyrma medeis Trager, 1988

= Dorymyrmex smithi =

Species of ant

Dorymyrmex smithi is a species of ants in the genus Dorymyrmex. Described by Cole in 1936, the species is endemic to the United States and Mexico.
