= Dorymyrmex antarcticus =

Scientific classification
- Domain: Eukaryota
- Kingdom: Animalia
- Phylum: Arthropoda
- Class: Insecta
- Order: Hymenoptera
- Family: Formicidae
- Subfamily: Dolichoderinae
- Genus: Dorymyrmex
- Species: D. antarcticus

Binomial name
- Dorymyrmex antarcticus Forel, 1904

Synonyms
- Dorymyrmex tener pallidipes Brèthes, 1914

Species of ant

Dorymyrmex antarcticus is a species of ant in the genus Dorymyrmex. Described by Forel in 1904, the species is endemic to Argentina and Chile.
