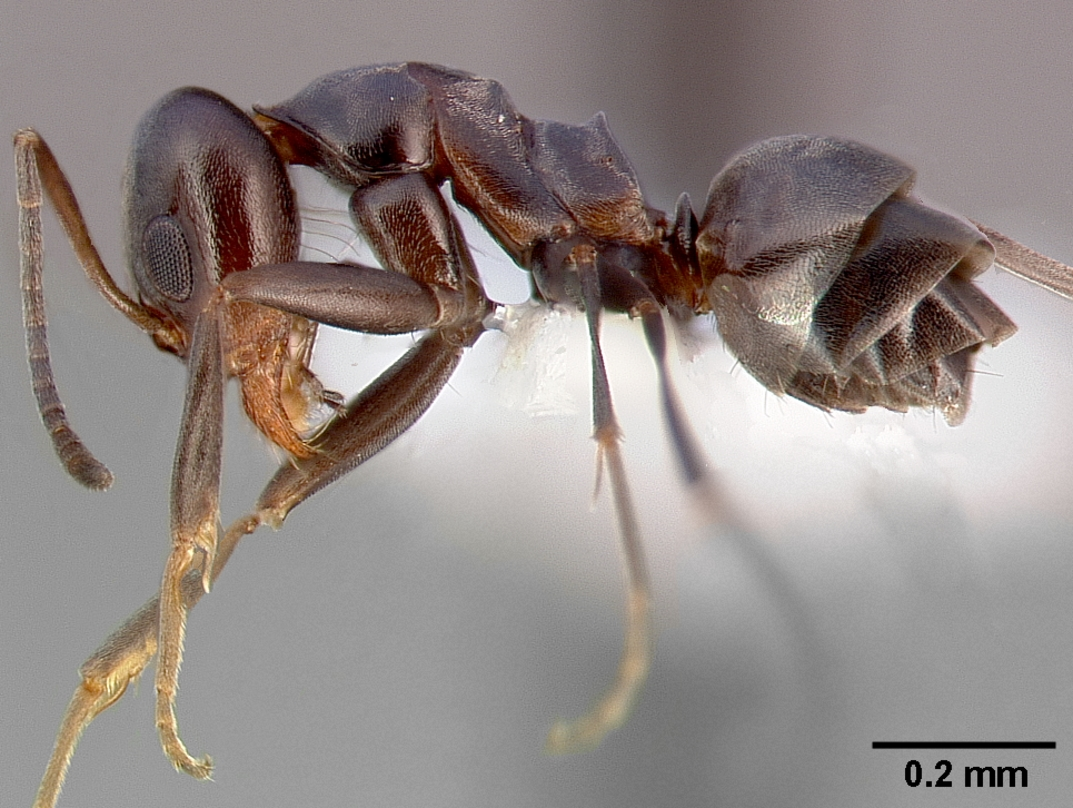
- Worker

Conservation status
- Vulnerable (IUCN 2.3)

Scientific classification
- Kingdom: Animalia
- Phylum: Arthropoda
- Clade: Pancrustacea
- Class: Insecta
- Order: Hymenoptera
- Family: Formicidae
- Subfamily: Dolichoderinae
- Genus: Dorymyrmex
- Species: D. insanus

Binomial name
- Dorymyrmex insanus Buckley, 1866

= Dorymyrmex insanus =

Species of ant

Dorymyrmex insanus is a species of pyramid ant, one of several species known as crazy ants, for their "frenetic" movement and swarming behavior. It is found in hot, dry habitats in the southern parts of the United States, much of Central America, and tropical South America. Dorymyrmex insanus is listed as Vulnerable by the International Union for Conservation of Nature (IUCN).

== Etymology ==
The specific epithet insanus, meaning "insane" in Latin, comes from the ant's frenzied movements and their ability to quickly swarm prey or food.

== Biology ==
Dorymyrmex insanus live in mostly hot, very dry, and open environments. The diet of workers includes honeydew or any other nutritious liquid and insect carcasses, both of which are obtained through foraging (though they will hunt insects on occasion). When these ants find food, they form large quickly moving foraging trails that can adapt to the terrain they move through. Their ability to live in large, open areas allows them to live in areas disturbed by agriculture or in places largely settled by humans. Their nests appear as small cone shaped mounds in the earth measuring around 10 cm (3.9 in) in diameter. These nest entrances are usually hard to spot on their own, but are usually found in clusters, making them more conspicuous. Their workers tend to be very active even in extreme heat, as they have a large heat tolerance compared to other species of ant that live in their habitat.
