= Dorymyrmex chilensis =

Scientific classification
- Kingdom: Animalia
- Phylum: Arthropoda
- Clade: Pancrustacea
- Class: Insecta
- Order: Hymenoptera
- Family: Formicidae
- Subfamily: Dolichoderinae
- Genus: Dorymyrmex
- Species: D. chilensis

Binomial name
- Dorymyrmex chilensis Forel, 1911

Species of ant

Dorymyrmex chilensis is a species of ant in the genus Dorymyrmex. Described by Forel in 1911, the species is endemic to Chile. It was recognized as a distinct species in 1975.
