= Dorymyrmex emmaericaellus =

Scientific classification
- Domain: Eukaryota
- Kingdom: Animalia
- Phylum: Arthropoda
- Class: Insecta
- Order: Hymenoptera
- Family: Formicidae
- Subfamily: Dolichoderinae
- Genus: Dorymyrmex
- Species: D. emmaericaellus

Binomial name
- Dorymyrmex emmaericaellus Kusnezov, 1951

Species of ant

Dorymyrmex emmaericaellus is a species of ant in the genus Dorymyrmex. Described by Kusnezov in 1951, the species is endemic to Bolivia.
