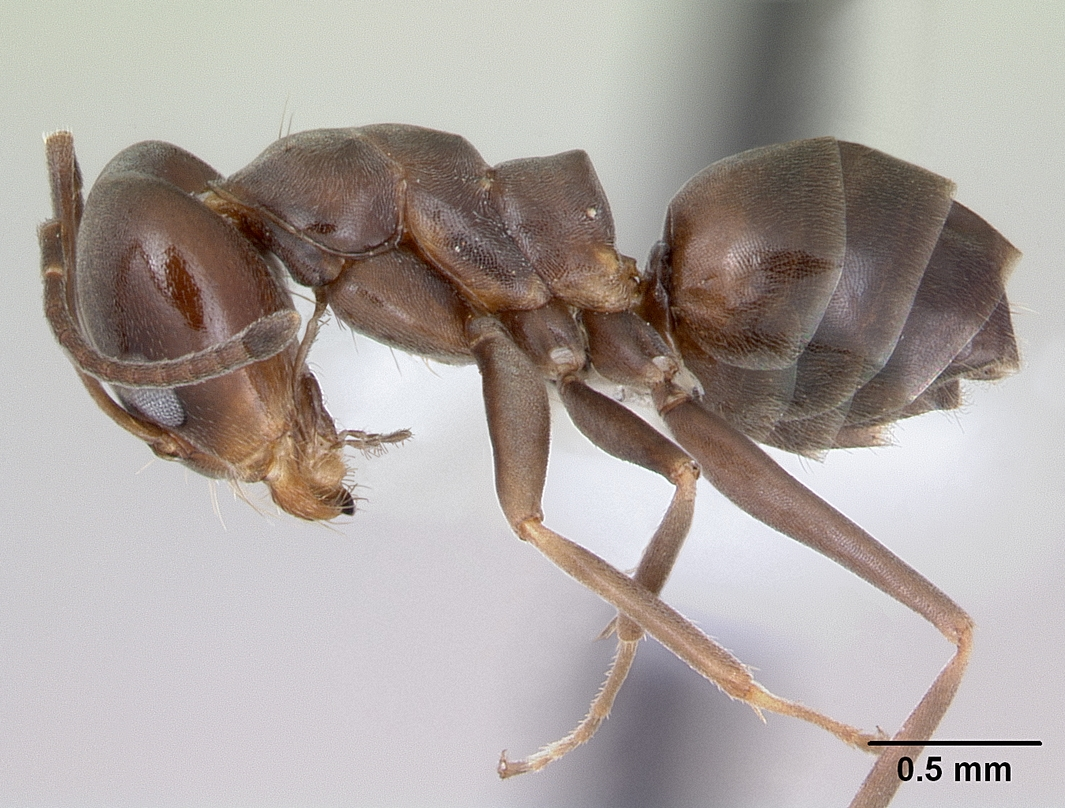

Scientific classification
- Domain: Eukaryota
- Kingdom: Animalia
- Phylum: Arthropoda
- Class: Insecta
- Order: Hymenoptera
- Family: Formicidae
- Subfamily: Dolichoderinae
- Genus: Dorymyrmex
- Species: D. spurius

Binomial name
- Dorymyrmex spurius Santschi, 1929

= Dorymyrmex spurius =

Species of ant

Dorymyrmex spurius is a species of ant in the genus Dorymyrmex. Described by Felix Santschi in 1929, the species is endemic to Argentina, Brazil, Paraguay and Uruguay.
