= Dorymyrmex antillana =

Scientific classification
- Domain: Eukaryota
- Kingdom: Animalia
- Phylum: Arthropoda
- Class: Insecta
- Order: Hymenoptera
- Family: Formicidae
- Subfamily: Dolichoderinae
- Genus: Dorymyrmex
- Species: D. antillana

Binomial name
- Dorymyrmex antillana Snelling, R.R., 2005

Species of ant

Dorymyrmex antillana is a species of ant in the genus Dorymyrmex. Described by Snelling in 2005, the species is endemic to Puerto Rico and the Dominican Republic, where they nest in open sandy areas.
