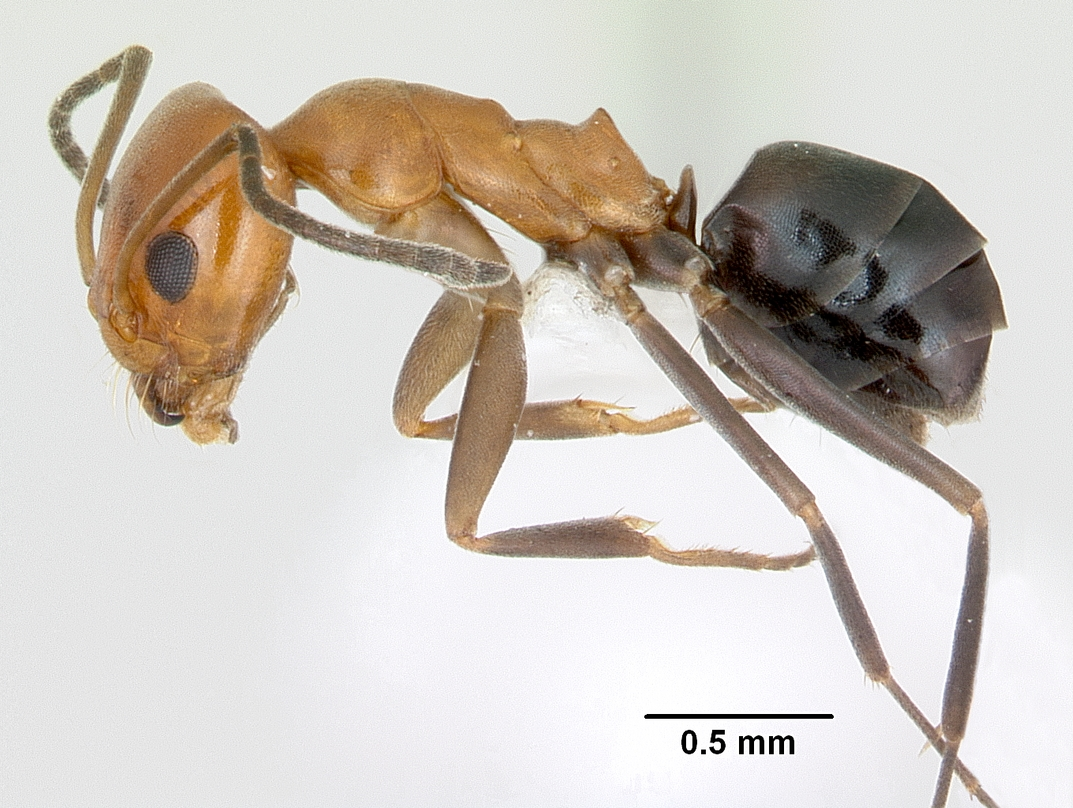

Scientific classification
- Domain: Eukaryota
- Kingdom: Animalia
- Phylum: Arthropoda
- Class: Insecta
- Order: Hymenoptera
- Family: Formicidae
- Subfamily: Dolichoderinae
- Genus: Dorymyrmex
- Species: D. pyramicus

Binomial name
- Dorymyrmex pyramicus (Roger, 1863)

Subspecies
- Dorymyrmex pyramicus albemarlensis Wheeler, W.M., 1919; Dorymyrmex pyramicus alticonis Forel, 1912; Dorymyrmex pyramicus garbei Forel, 1911; Dorymyrmex pyramicus guyanensis Santschi, 1922; Dorymyrmex pyramicus mesonotalis Forel, 1912; Dorymyrmex pyramicus nigriventris Santschi, 1922; Dorymyrmex pyramicus peruvianus Wheeler, W.M., 1919; Dorymyrmex pyramicus rubriceps Forel, 1912

= Dorymyrmex pyramicus =

Species of ant

Dorymyrmex pyramicus is a species of ant in the genus Dorymyrmex. Described by Roger in 1863, the species is found in many countries of South America.
