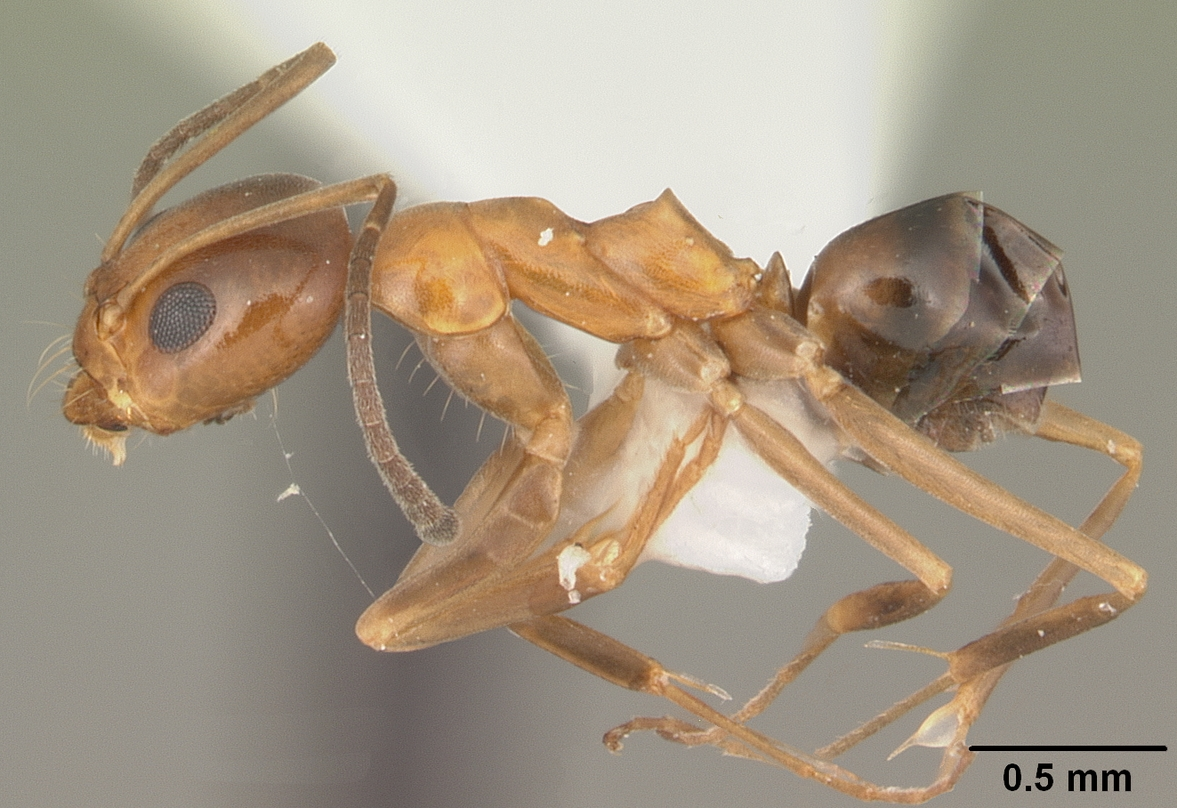

Scientific classification
- Kingdom: Animalia
- Phylum: Arthropoda
- Clade: Pancrustacea
- Class: Insecta
- Order: Hymenoptera
- Family: Formicidae
- Subfamily: Dolichoderinae
- Genus: Dorymyrmex
- Species: D. bossutus

Binomial name
- Dorymyrmex bossutus (Trager, 1988)

= Dorymyrmex bossutus =

Species of ant

Dorymyrmex bossutus is a species of ant in the genus Dorymyrmex. This species is endemic to the United States. It was described by Trager in 1988.
