= Dorymyrmex amazonicus =

Scientific classification
- Domain: Eukaryota
- Kingdom: Animalia
- Phylum: Arthropoda
- Class: Insecta
- Order: Hymenoptera
- Family: Formicidae
- Subfamily: Dolichoderinae
- Genus: Dorymyrmex
- Species: D. amazonicus

Binomial name
- Dorymyrmex amazonicus Cuezzo & Guerrero, 2011

Species of ant

Dorymyrmex amazonicus is a Neotropical species of ant in the subfamily Dolichoderinae.

The species is known only from its type locality in Colombia. The type series was collected in the vicinity of an Amazonian forest relict, outside Leticia, Colombia. All the specimens were collected in open deforested habitat, probably this is an indication of the preference of this species to nest in highly anthropic or disturbed environments.

Queens and males are unknown.
