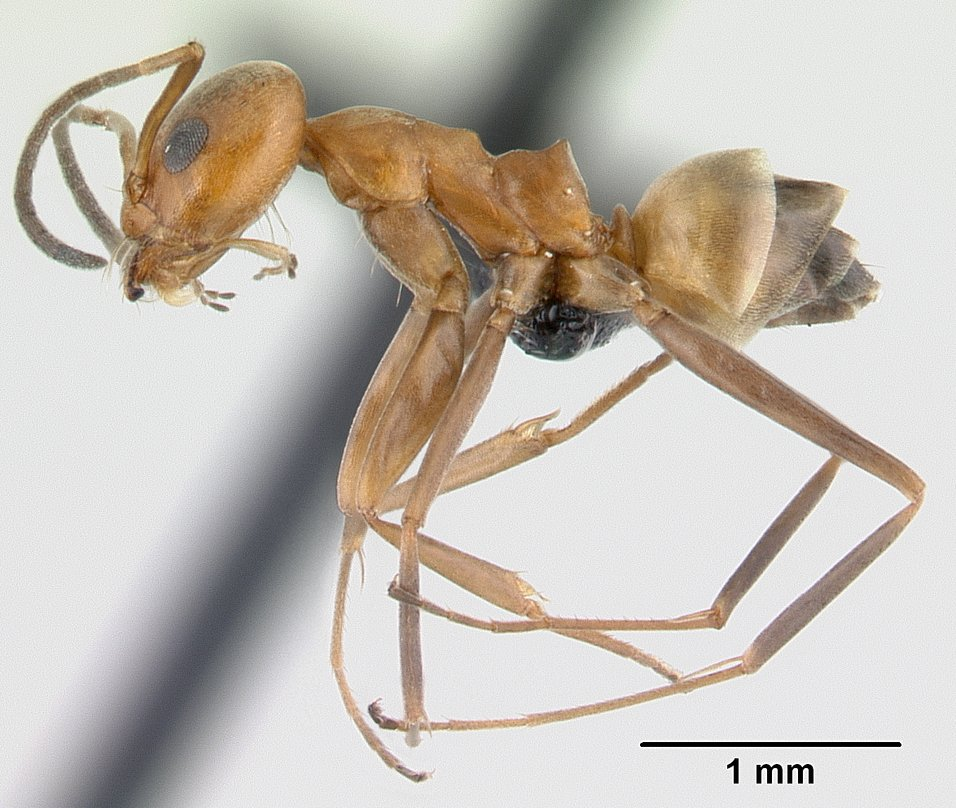

Scientific classification
- Domain: Eukaryota
- Kingdom: Animalia
- Phylum: Arthropoda
- Class: Insecta
- Order: Hymenoptera
- Family: Formicidae
- Subfamily: Dolichoderinae
- Genus: Dorymyrmex
- Species: D. biconis

Binomial name
- Dorymyrmex biconis Forel, 1912

= Dorymyrmex biconis =

Species of ant

Dorymyrmex biconis is a species of ant in the genus Dorymyrmex. Described by Forel in 1912, the species is endemic to Colombia and Venezuela.
