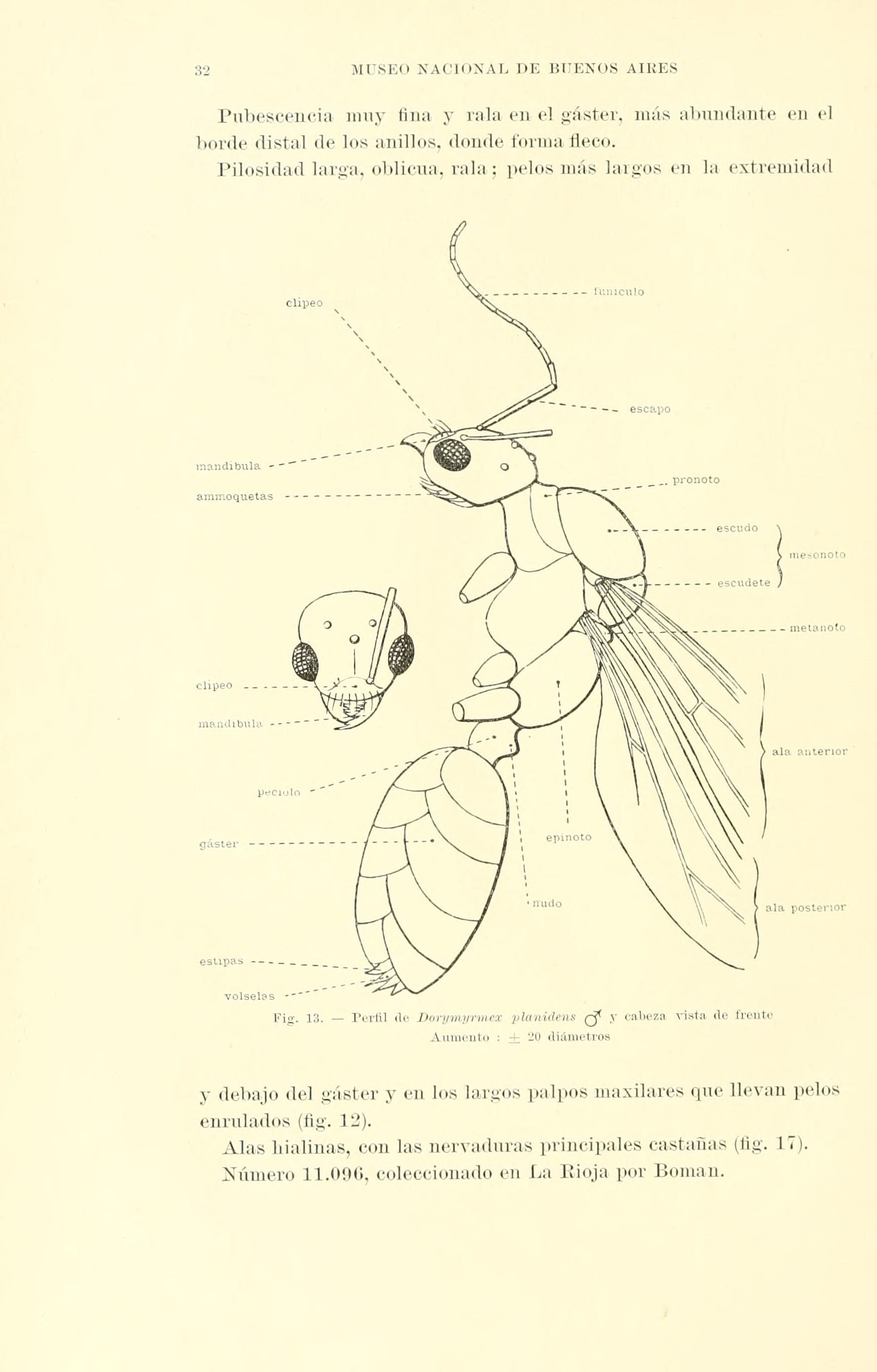

Scientific classification
- Domain: Eukaryota
- Kingdom: Animalia
- Phylum: Arthropoda
- Class: Insecta
- Order: Hymenoptera
- Family: Formicidae
- Subfamily: Dolichoderinae
- Genus: Dorymyrmex
- Species: D. planidens

Binomial name
- Dorymyrmex planidens Mayr, 1868

= Dorymyrmex planidens =

Species of ant

Dorymyrmex planidens is a species of ant in the genus Dorymyrmex. Described by Gustav Mayr in 1868, the species is endemic to Argentina and Chile.
