= Dorymyrmex goetschi =

Scientific classification
- Kingdom: Animalia
- Phylum: Arthropoda
- Class: Insecta
- Order: Hymenoptera
- Family: Formicidae
- Subfamily: Dolichoderinae
- Genus: Dorymyrmex
- Species: D. goetschi

Binomial name
- Dorymyrmex goetschi Goetsch, 1933

Species of ant

Dorymyrmex goetschi is a species of ant in the genus Dorymyrmex. Described by Goetsch in 1933, the species is endemic to Chile.
