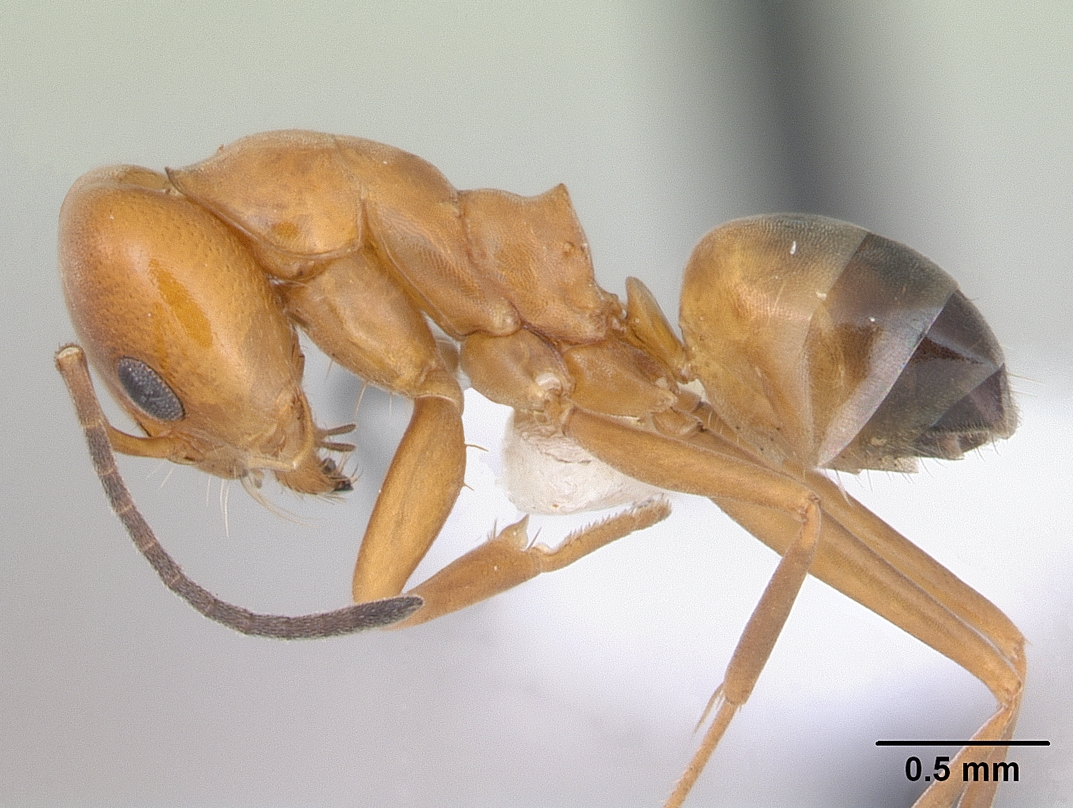
- D. paranensis worker

Scientific classification
- Domain: Eukaryota
- Kingdom: Animalia
- Phylum: Arthropoda
- Class: Insecta
- Order: Hymenoptera
- Family: Formicidae
- Subfamily: Dolichoderinae
- Genus: Dorymyrmex
- Species: D. paranensis

Binomial name
- Dorymyrmex paranensis Santschi, 1922

= Dorymyrmex paranensis =

Species of ant

Dorymyrmex paranensis is a species of ant in the genus Dorymyrmex. Described by Felix Santschi in 1922, the species is endemic to Paraguay.
