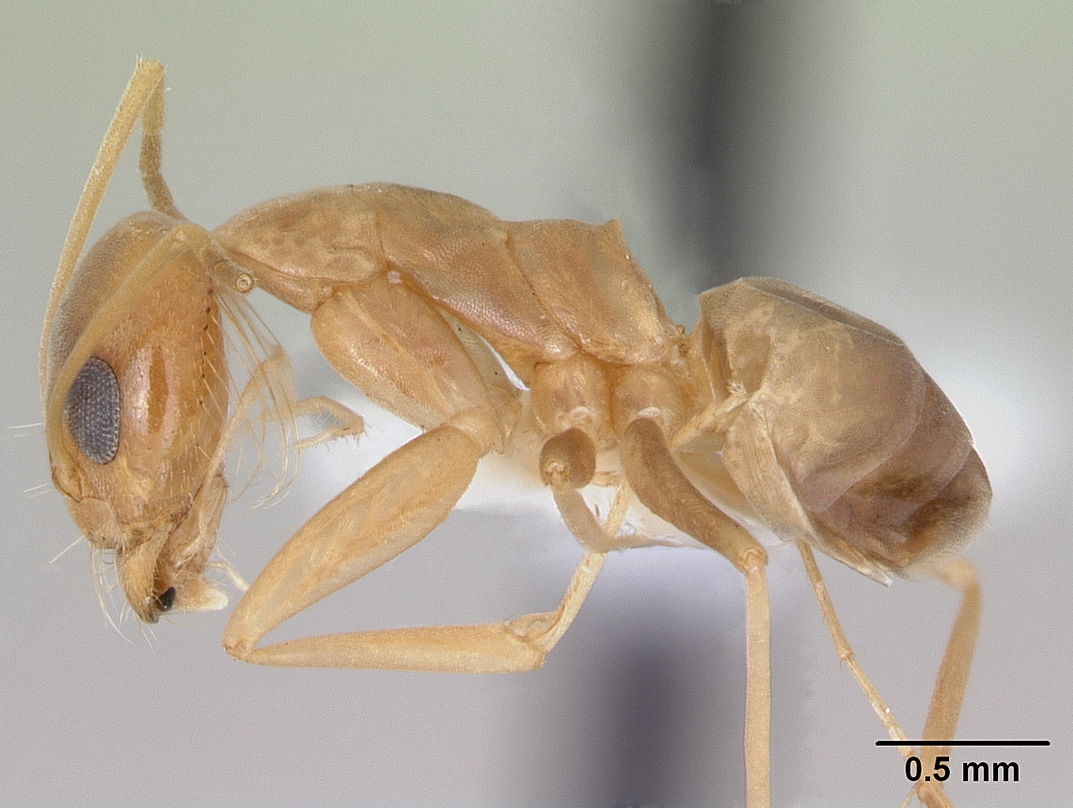

Scientific classification
- Domain: Eukaryota
- Kingdom: Animalia
- Phylum: Arthropoda
- Class: Insecta
- Order: Hymenoptera
- Family: Formicidae
- Subfamily: Dolichoderinae
- Genus: Dorymyrmex
- Species: D. exsanguis

Binomial name
- Dorymyrmex exsanguis Forel, 1912

Subspecies
- Dorymyrmex exsanguis anaemicus Santschi, 1922; Dorymyrmex exsanguis carbonarius Forel, 1913; Dorymyrmex exsanguis sordidus Santschi, 1919

= Dorymyrmex exsanguis =

Species of ant

Dorymyrmex exsanguis is a species of ant in the genus Dorymyrmex. Described by Forel in 1912, the species is endemic to Argentina and Paraguay.
