= Dorymyrmex agallardoi =

Scientific classification
- Kingdom: Animalia
- Phylum: Arthropoda
- Class: Insecta
- Order: Hymenoptera
- Family: Formicidae
- Subfamily: Dolichoderinae
- Genus: Dorymyrmex
- Species: D. agallardoi

Binomial name
- Dorymyrmex agallardoi Snelling, R.R., 1975

Species of ant

Dorymyrmex agallardoi is a species of ant in the genus Dorymyrmex. Described by Snelling in 1975, the species is endemic to Chile.
