= Dorymyrmex santschii =

Scientific classification
- Domain: Eukaryota
- Kingdom: Animalia
- Phylum: Arthropoda
- Class: Insecta
- Order: Hymenoptera
- Family: Formicidae
- Subfamily: Dolichoderinae
- Genus: Dorymyrmex
- Species: D. santschii

Binomial name
- Dorymyrmex santschii Gallardo, 1917

Species of ant

Dorymyrmex santschii is a species of ant in the genus Dorymyrmex. Described by Gallardo in 1917, the species is endemic to Argentina.
