= Dorymyrmex minutus =

Scientific classification
- Domain: Eukaryota
- Kingdom: Animalia
- Phylum: Arthropoda
- Class: Insecta
- Order: Hymenoptera
- Family: Formicidae
- Subfamily: Dolichoderinae
- Genus: Dorymyrmex
- Species: D. minutus

Binomial name
- Dorymyrmex minutus Emery, 1895

Species of ant

Dorymyrmex minutus is a species of ant in the genus Dorymyrmex. Described by Emery in 1895, the species is endemic to Argentina and Chile
