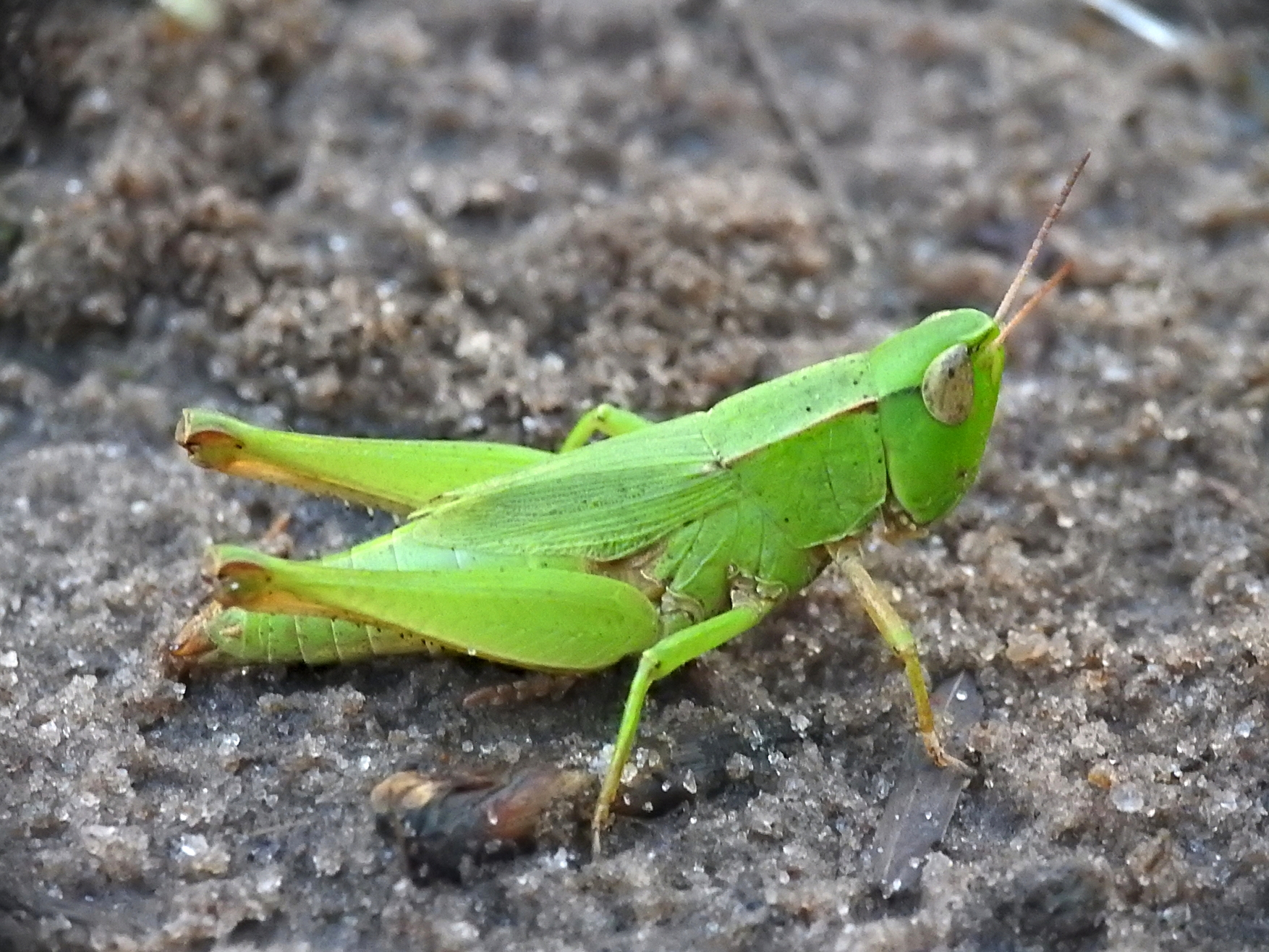

Scientific classification
- Kingdom: Animalia
- Phylum: Arthropoda
- Clade: Pancrustacea
- Class: Insecta
- Order: Orthoptera
- Suborder: Caelifera
- Family: Acrididae
- Genus: Dichromorpha
- Species: D. viridis

Binomial name
- Dichromorpha viridis (Scudder, 1863)

= Dichromorpha viridis =

Species of grasshopper

Dichromorpha viridis, the short-winged green grasshopper, is a common species of slant-faced grasshoppers found in North America.

Males of this grasshopper, as the common name suggests, are mostly green in color with a face that slants dorsally. They are about 14-22 mm in length. The females, however, are typically brown, and usually much larger than the male at around 23-30 mm.
