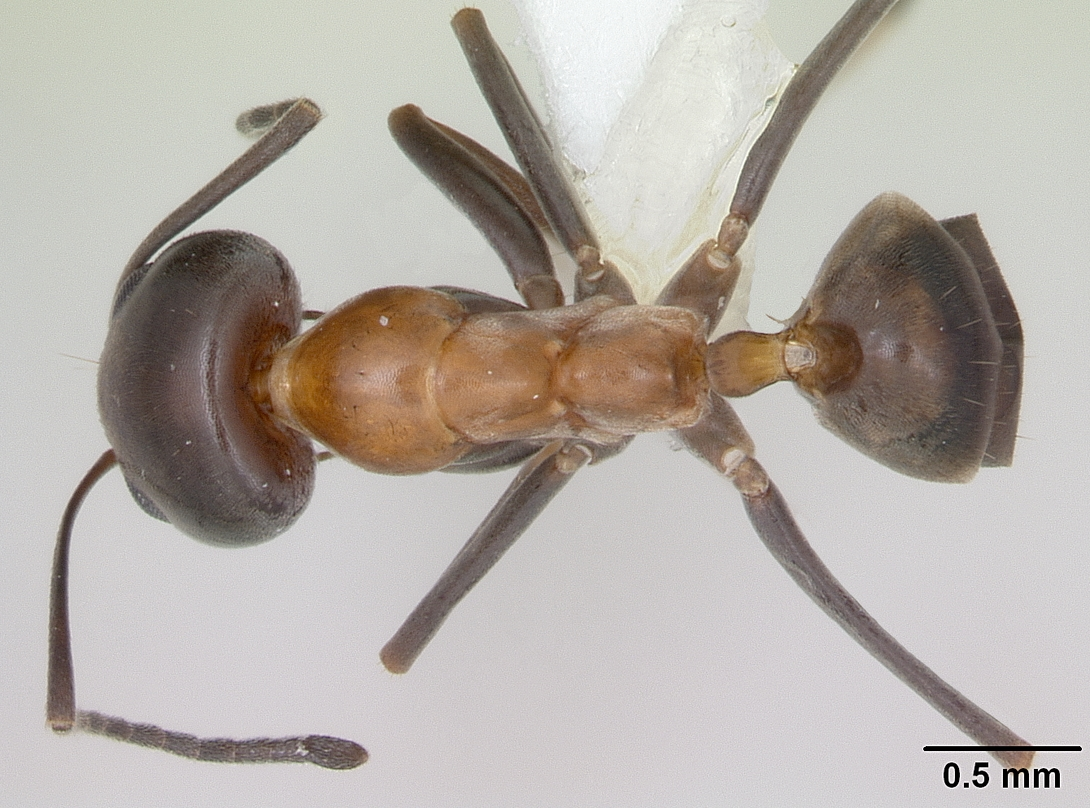
- D. thoracicus worker

Scientific classification
- Domain: Eukaryota
- Kingdom: Animalia
- Phylum: Arthropoda
- Class: Insecta
- Order: Hymenoptera
- Family: Formicidae
- Subfamily: Dolichoderinae
- Genus: Dorymyrmex
- Species: D. thoracicus

Binomial name
- Dorymyrmex thoracicus Gallardo, 1916

Subspecies
- Dorymyrmex thoracicus gracilis Santschi, 1920; Dorymyrmex thoracicus tigris Santschi, 1925

= Dorymyrmex thoracicus =

Species of ant

Dorymyrmex is a species of ant in the genus Dorymyrmex. Described by Gallardo in 1916, the species is endemic to Argentina, Paraguay and Venezuela.
