= Dorymyrmex breviscapis =

Scientific classification
- Domain: Eukaryota
- Kingdom: Animalia
- Phylum: Arthropoda
- Class: Insecta
- Order: Hymenoptera
- Family: Formicidae
- Subfamily: Dolichoderinae
- Genus: Dorymyrmex
- Species: D. breviscapis

Binomial name
- Dorymyrmex breviscapis Forel, 1912

Subspecies
- Dorymyrmex breviscapis alvarezi Santschi, 1922; Dorymyrmex breviscapis elongatulus Santschi, 1919; Dorymyrmex breviscapis speculiceps Santschi, 1922

Species of ant

Dorymyrmex breviscapis is a species of ant in the genus Dorymyrmex. Described by Forel in 1912, the species is endemic to Argentina.
