= Dorymyrmex steigeri =

Scientific classification
- Domain: Eukaryota
- Kingdom: Animalia
- Phylum: Arthropoda
- Class: Insecta
- Order: Hymenoptera
- Family: Formicidae
- Subfamily: Dolichoderinae
- Genus: Dorymyrmex
- Species: D. steigeri

Binomial name
- Dorymyrmex steigeri Santschi, 1912

Subspecies
- Dorymyrmex steigeri platensis Gallardo, 1916

Species of ant

Dorymyrmex steigeri is a species of ant in the genus Dorymyrmex. Described by Felix Santschi in 1912, the species is endemic to Argentina and Uruguay.
