= Dorymyrmex ebeninus =

Scientific classification
- Domain: Eukaryota
- Kingdom: Animalia
- Phylum: Arthropoda
- Class: Insecta
- Order: Hymenoptera
- Family: Formicidae
- Subfamily: Dolichoderinae
- Genus: Dorymyrmex
- Species: D. ebeninus

Binomial name
- Dorymyrmex ebeninus Forel, 1914

Species of ant

Dorymyrmex ebeninus is a species of ant in the genus Dorymyrmex. Described by Forel in 1914, the species is endemic to Argentina.
