= Dorymyrmex morenoi =

Scientific classification
- Domain: Eukaryota
- Kingdom: Animalia
- Phylum: Arthropoda
- Class: Insecta
- Order: Hymenoptera
- Family: Formicidae
- Subfamily: Dolichoderinae
- Genus: Dorymyrmex
- Species: D. morenoi

Binomial name
- Dorymyrmex morenoi Bruch, 1921

Subspecies
- Dorymyrmex morenoi patagon Santschi, 1922

Species of ant

Dorymyrmex morenoi is a species of ant in the genus Dorymyrmex. Described by Bruch in 1921, the species is endemic to Argentina.
