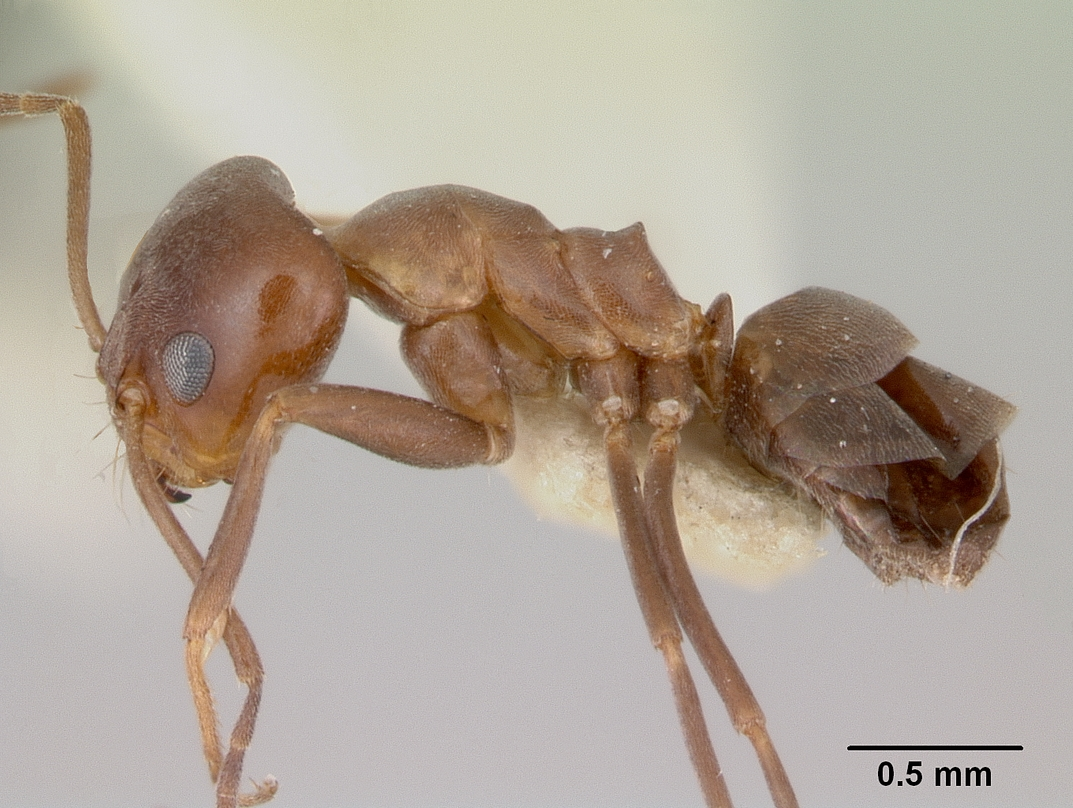
- D. paiute worker

Scientific classification
- Domain: Eukaryota
- Kingdom: Animalia
- Phylum: Arthropoda
- Class: Insecta
- Order: Hymenoptera
- Family: Formicidae
- Subfamily: Dolichoderinae
- Genus: Dorymyrmex
- Species: D. paiute

Binomial name
- Dorymyrmex paiute Snelling, R.R., 1995

= Dorymyrmex paiute =

Species of ant

Dorymyrmex paiute is a species of ant in the genus Dorymyrmex. Described by Snelling in 1995, the species is endemic to the United States.
