= Dorymyrmex caretteoides =

Scientific classification
- Domain: Eukaryota
- Kingdom: Animalia
- Phylum: Arthropoda
- Class: Insecta
- Order: Hymenoptera
- Family: Formicidae
- Subfamily: Dolichoderinae
- Genus: Dorymyrmex
- Species: D. caretteoides

Binomial name
- Dorymyrmex caretteoides Forel 1914

Species of ant

Dorymyrmex caretteoides is a species of ant in the genus Dorymyrmex. Described by Forel in 1914, the species is endemic to Argentina.
