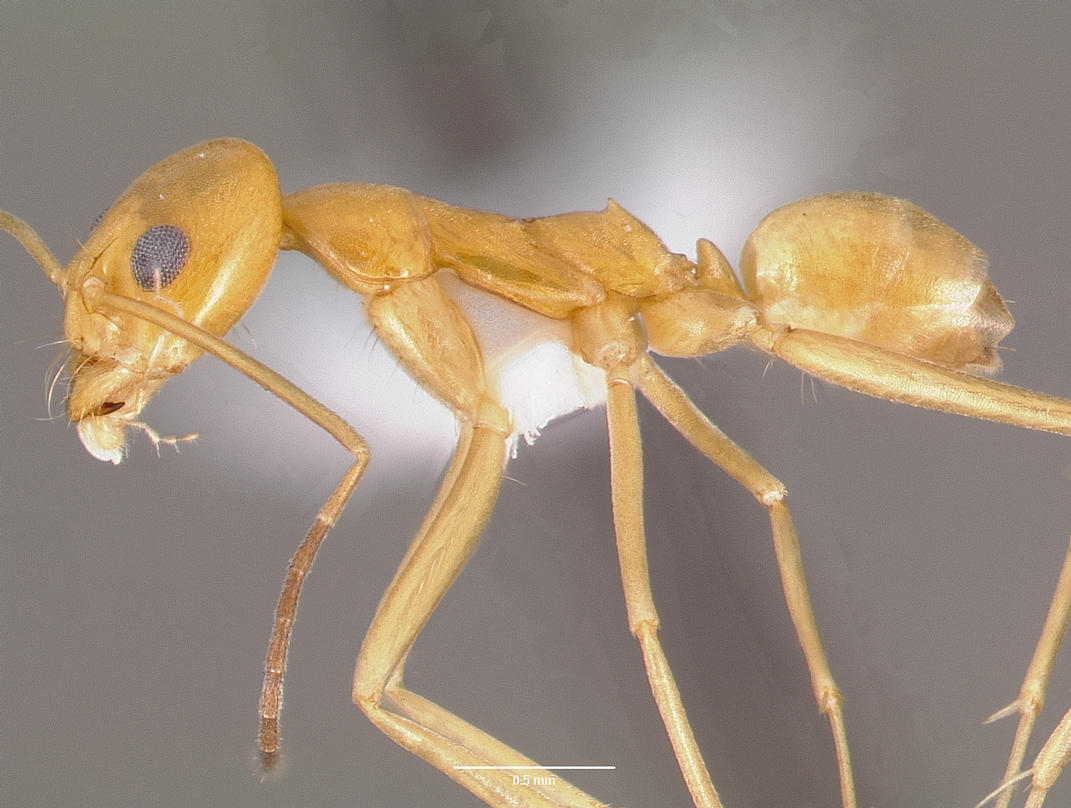

Scientific classification
- Domain: Eukaryota
- Kingdom: Animalia
- Phylum: Arthropoda
- Class: Insecta
- Order: Hymenoptera
- Family: Formicidae
- Subfamily: Dolichoderinae
- Genus: Dorymyrmex
- Species: D. elegans

Binomial name
- Dorymyrmex elegans (Trager, 1988)

Synonyms
- Conomyrma elegans Trager, 1988

= Dorymyrmex elegans =

Species of ant

Dorymyrmex elegans is a species of ant in the genus Dorymyrmex described by Trager in 1988, It is endemic to Florida scrubs on the Lake Wales Ridge in Florida.
