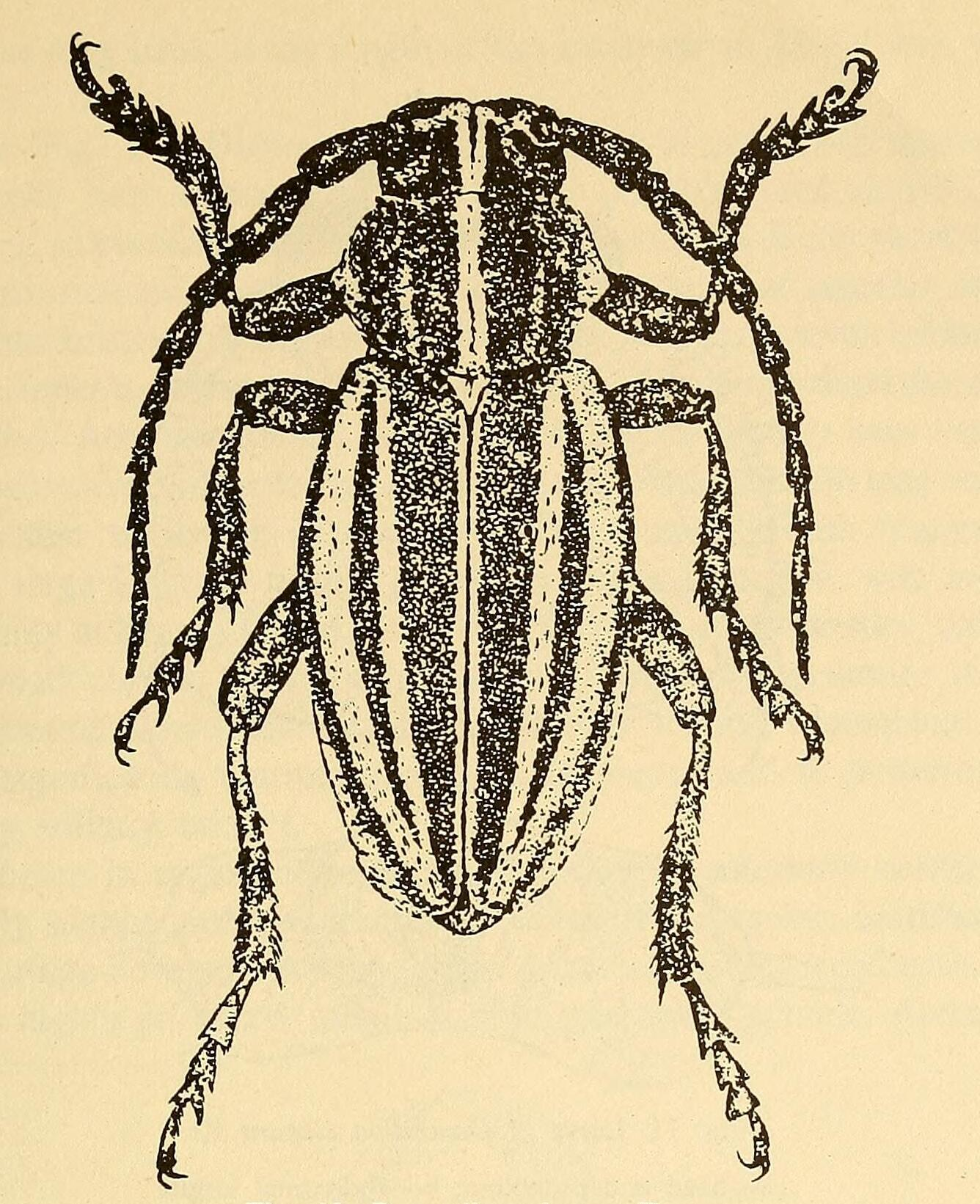
- Dorcadion elegans

Scientific classification
- Kingdom: Animalia
- Phylum: Arthropoda
- Clade: Pancrustacea
- Class: Insecta
- Order: Coleoptera
- Suborder: Polyphaga
- Infraorder: Cucujiformia
- Family: Cerambycidae
- Genus: Dorcadion
- Species: D. elegans

Binomial name
- Dorcadion elegans Jakovlev, 1899

= Dorcadion elegans =

Species of beetle

Dorcadion elegans is a species of longhorn beetles of the subfamily Lamiinae.

== Distribution ==
It is found in Russia, Kazakhstan, and Ukraine.

== Description ==
The length of the adults is 8.5–11.5 millimetres (0.33–0.45 in). The bands on the elytron have conspicuous points in the basal half.

== Environment ==
It inhabits the steppes.
