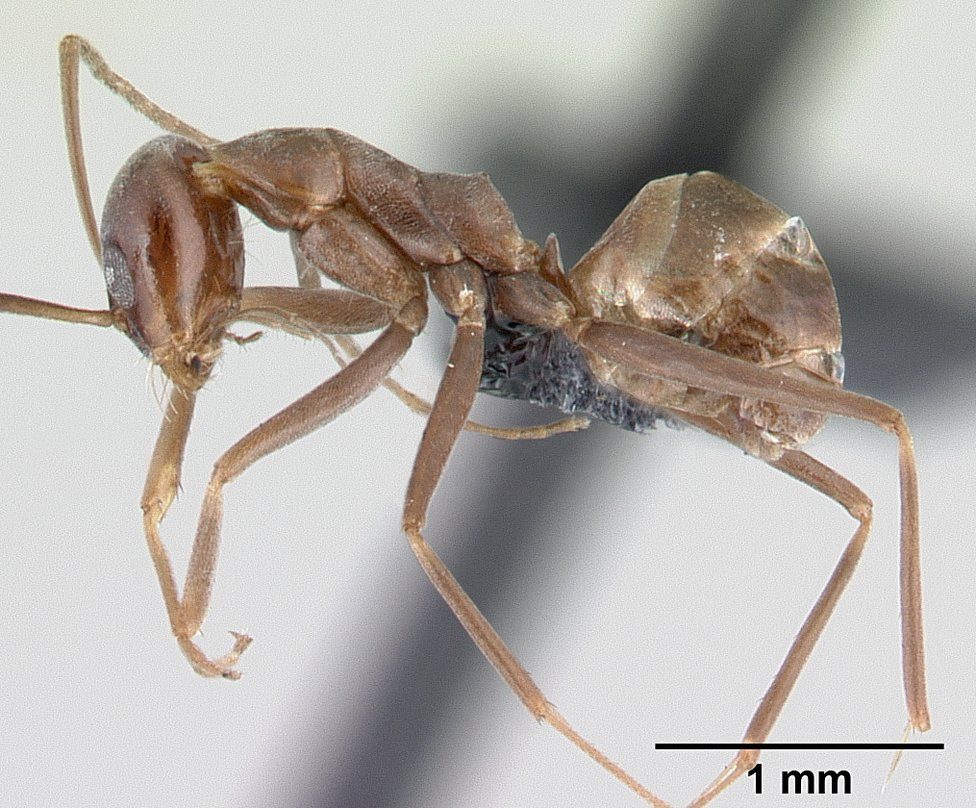

Scientific classification
- Domain: Eukaryota
- Kingdom: Animalia
- Phylum: Arthropoda
- Class: Insecta
- Order: Hymenoptera
- Family: Formicidae
- Subfamily: Dolichoderinae
- Genus: Dorymyrmex
- Species: D. goeldii

Binomial name
- Dorymyrmex goeldii Forel, 1904

Subspecies
- Dorymyrmex goeldii dubius Forel, 1912; Dorymyrmex goeldii fumigatus Forel, 1908

= Dorymyrmex goeldii =

Species of ant

Dorymyrmex goeldii is a species of ant in the genus Dorymyrmex. Described by Forel in 1904, the species is endemic to Brazil.
