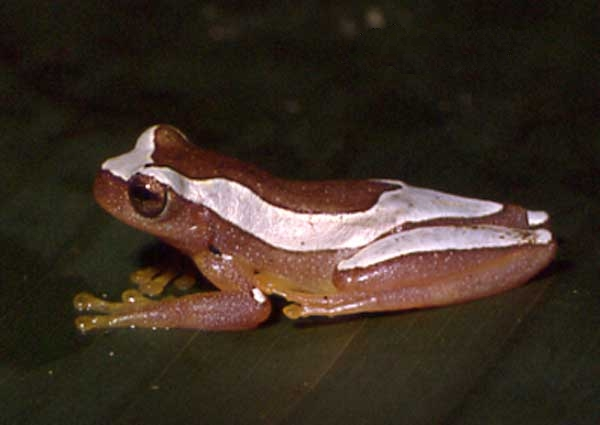

Conservation status
- Least Concern (IUCN 3.1)

Scientific classification
- Kingdom: Animalia
- Phylum: Chordata
- Class: Amphibia
- Order: Anura
- Family: Hylidae
- Genus: Dendropsophus
- Species: D. elegans

Binomial name
- Dendropsophus elegans (Wied-Neuwied, 1824)

= Dendropsophus elegans =

Species of frog

Dendropsophus elegans is a species of frog in the family Hylidae. It is endemic to Brazil. Its natural habitats are subtropical or tropical moist lowland forests, subtropical or tropical moist shrubland, subtropical or tropical seasonally wet or flooded lowland grassland, freshwater marshes, intermittent freshwater marshes, pastureland, plantations, heavily degraded former forest, and ponds.
