= Dolichoderus elegans =

†Dolichoderus elegans Temporal range: Middle to Late Eocene Baltic amber

Scientific classification
- Domain: Eukaryota
- Kingdom: Animalia
- Phylum: Arthropoda
- Class: Insecta
- Order: Hymenoptera
- Family: Formicidae
- Subfamily: Dolichoderinae
- Genus: Dolichoderus
- Species: D. elegans

Binomial name
- Dolichoderus elegans Wheeler, W.M., 1915

Species of ant

Dolichoderus elegans is an extinct species of Eocene ant in the genus Dolichoderus. Described by William Morton Wheeler in 1915, the fossilised remains of the species were found in the Baltic amber.
