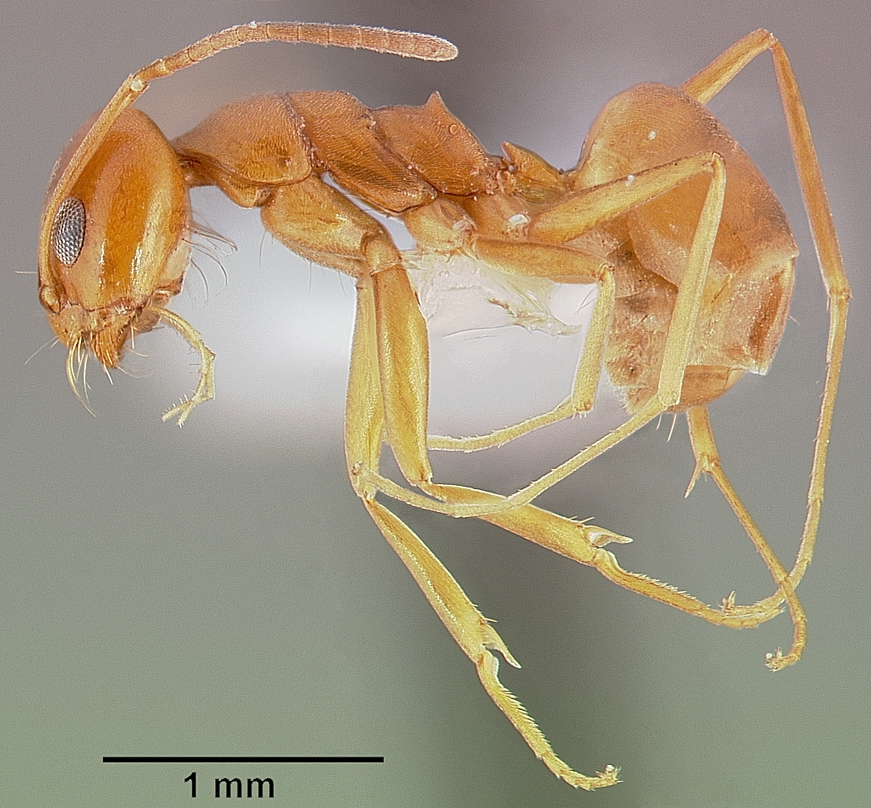

Scientific classification
- Domain: Eukaryota
- Kingdom: Animalia
- Phylum: Arthropoda
- Class: Insecta
- Order: Hymenoptera
- Family: Formicidae
- Subfamily: Dolichoderinae
- Genus: Dorymyrmex
- Species: D. flavus

Binomial name
- Dorymyrmex flavus McCook, 1879

Synonyms
- Dorymyrmex pyramicus nigra Pergande, 1896

= Dorymyrmex flavus =

Species of ant

Dorymyrmex flavus is a species of ant in the genus Dorymyrmex. Described by McCook in 1879, the species is endemic to the United States and Mexico.

== Etymology ==
Flavus is the Latin word for yellow, and describes the golden-yellow color of the ant.
