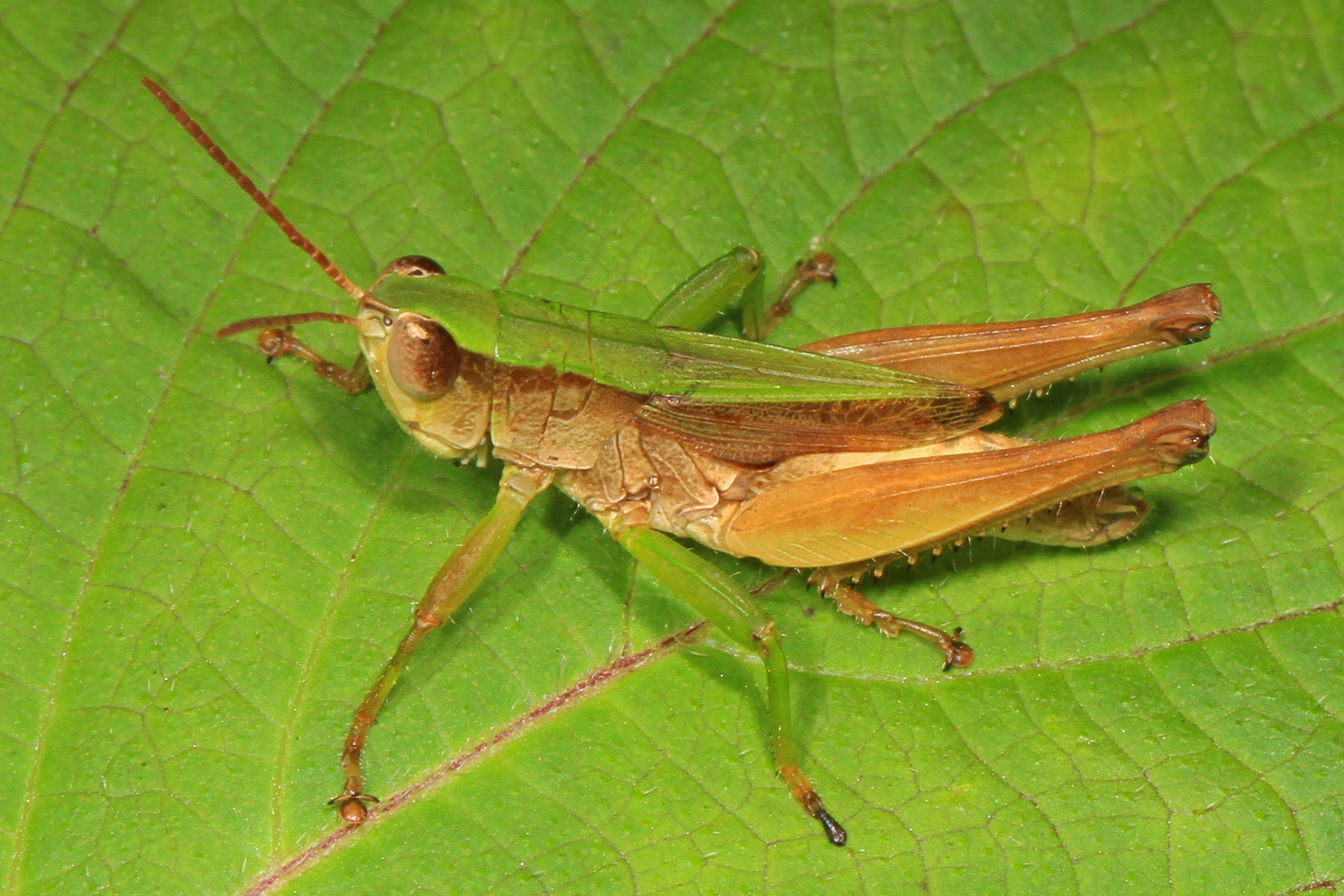
- Dichromorpha viridis

Scientific classification
- Domain: Eukaryota
- Kingdom: Animalia
- Phylum: Arthropoda
- Class: Insecta
- Order: Orthoptera
- Suborder: Caelifera
- Superfamily: Acridoidea
- Family: Acrididae
- Genus: Dichromorpha; Morse, 1896

Species
- Four, see text.

Synonyms
- Clinocephalus Morse, 1896

= Dichromorpha =

Genus of grasshoppers

Dichromorpha is a genus of grasshoppers of the family Acrididae.

== Species ==
The following species are recognised in the genus Dichromorpha:

- Dichromorpha australis (Bruner, 1900)
- Dichromorpha elegans (Morse, 1896)
- Dichromorpha prominula (Bruner, 1904)
- Dichromorpha viridis (Scudder, 1862)
