= Dichromorpha elegans =

Scientific classification
- Domain: Eukaryota
- Kingdom: Animalia
- Phylum: Arthropoda
- Class: Insecta
- Order: Orthoptera
- Suborder: Caelifera
- Family: Acrididae
- Genus: Dichromorpha
- Species: D. elegans

Binomial name
- Dichromorpha elegans (Morse, 1896)

Synonyms
- Clinocephalus elegans Morse, 1896; Clinocephalus pulcher Rehn, J.A.G. & Hebard 1905

Species of grasshopper

Dichromorpha elegans, the short-winged grasshopper, is an insect species in the genus Dichromorpha.
