= Podismopsis styriaca =

Conservation status
- Vulnerable (IUCN 3.1)

Scientific classification
- Kingdom: Animalia
- Phylum: Arthropoda
- Clade: Pancrustacea
- Class: Insecta
- Order: Orthoptera
- Suborder: Caelifera
- Family: Acrididae
- Genus: Podismopsis
- Species: P. styriaca

Binomial name
- Podismopsis styriaca Koschuh, 2008

Species of insect

Podismopsis styriaca, the Styrian plump grasshopper, Styrian golden grasshopper, or Steirische goldschrecke, is a species of grasshopper endemic to a small area of the Austrian Alps.

== Distribution and habitat ==
Podismopsis styriaca is an alpine species restricted to a small area of the eastern Alps in the Austrian states of Styria and Carinthia. It prefers moist areas with dense vegetation, occurring in open alpine grasslands and dwarf shrub heathland near summits at elevations of 1,743–2,124 m (5,719–6,969 ft) above sea level, though it is most prevalent between 1,800–2,000 m (5,900–6,600 ft). This habitat is wind-exposed and dominated by Nardus stricta and Carex curvula, with species of Calluna, Loiseleuria, and Vaccinium also present.

== Ecology ==
Podismopsis styriaca stridulating

Podismopsis styriaca adults appear from early August to early November. The song is about half a second long and consists of five (rarely four) very rapid scratching or scraping sounds, each louder than the last.

Other orthopteran species found in the same habitat as P. styriaca include Gomphocerus sibiricus, Mecostethus parapleurus, Metrioptera brachyptera, Metrioptera roeselii, Miramella carinthiaca, Omocestus viridulus, Pholidoptera aptera, Pseudochorthippus montanus, Pseudochorthippus parallelus, Stenobothrus lineatus, and Stenobothrus stigmaticus.
