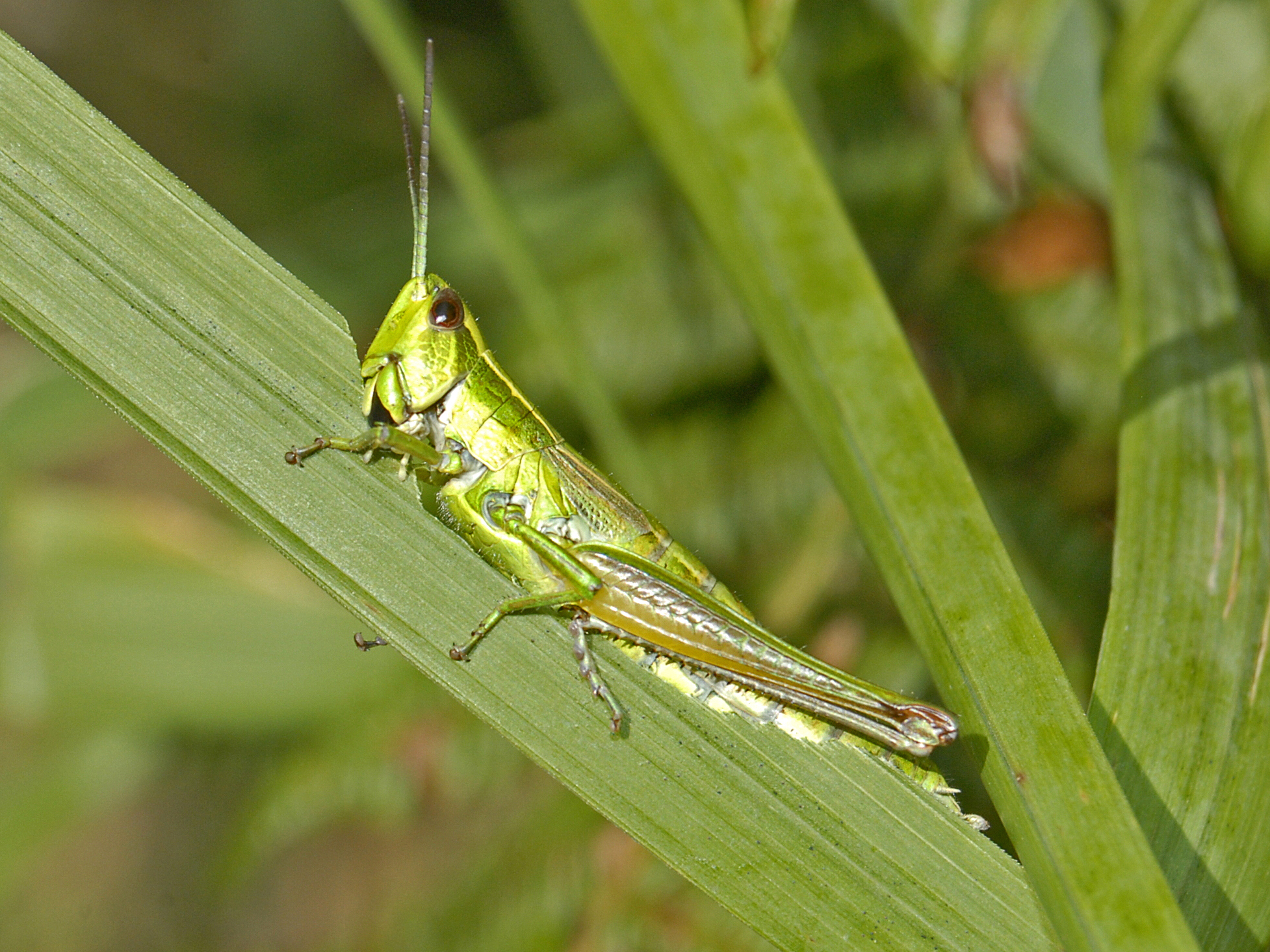
- Euthystira brachyptera

Scientific classification
- Kingdom: Animalia
- Phylum: Arthropoda
- Clade: Pancrustacea
- Class: Insecta
- Order: Orthoptera
- Suborder: Caelifera
- Family: Acrididae
- Subfamily: Gomphocerinae
- Tribe: Chrysochraontini; Brunner von Wattenwyl, 1893

Synonyms
- Chrysochraontes Brunner von Wattenwyl, 1893; Chrysochraontinae Brunner von Wattenwyl, 1893

= Chrysochraontini =

Tribe of grasshoppers

Chrysochraontini is a tribe of grasshoppers belonging to the subfamily Gomphocerinae.

== Genera ==
The Orthoptera Species File lists:

- Barracris - monotypic: B. petraea Gurney, Strohecker & Helfer, 1963
- Chloealtis Harris, T.W., 1841
- Chrysochraon Fischer, 1854 - type genus
- Confusacris Yin, X. & B. Li, 1987
- Euchorthippus Tarbinsky, 1926
- Euthystira Fieber, 1853
- Euthystiroides Zhang, F., Yiping Zheng & Bingzhong Ren, 1995
- Mongolotettix Rehn, 1928 (synonym Heteropterus Wang, 1992)
- Podismomorpha - monotypic: P. gibba Lian & Zheng, 1984
- Podismopsis Zubovski, 1900
- Pseudoasonus Yin, X., 1982
