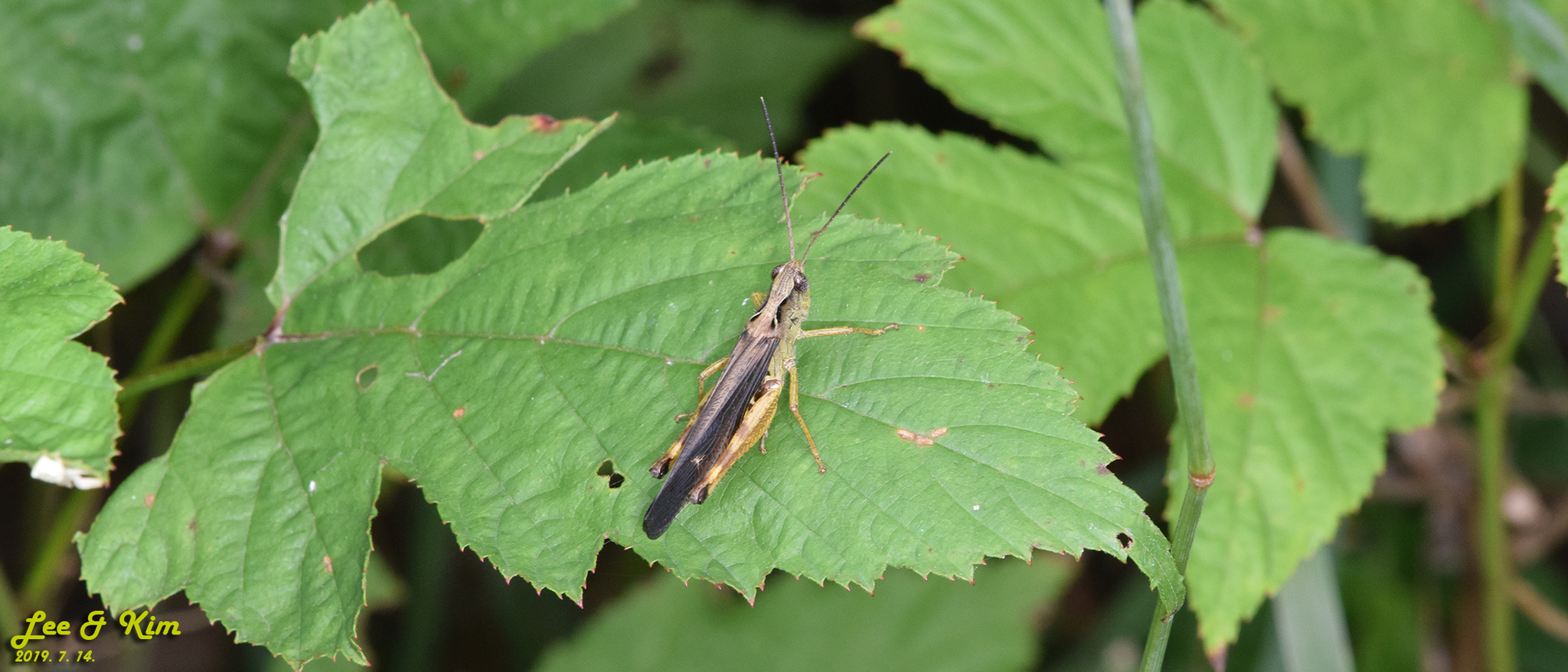
- Megaulacobothrus aethalinus, South Korea

Scientific classification
- Kingdom: Animalia
- Phylum: Arthropoda
- Clade: Pancrustacea
- Class: Insecta
- Order: Orthoptera
- Suborder: Caelifera
- Family: Acrididae
- Subfamily: Gomphocerinae
- Tribe: Stenobothrini
- Genus: Megaulacobothrus
- Species: M. aethalinus

Binomial name
- Megaulacobothrus aethalinus (Zubovski, 1899)

= Megaulacobothrus aethalinus =

Species of slant-faced grasshopper

Megaulacobothrus aethalinus is a species of slant-faced grasshopper in the family Acrididae. It is found in the Palearctic.

== Subspecies ==
These subspecies belong to the species Megaulacobothrus aethalinus:

- Megaulacobothrus aethalinus aethalinus (Zubovski, 1899)
- Megaulacobothrus aethalinus kongausensis Caudell, 1928
