= Podismopsis =

- Podismopsis keisti stridulating

Scientific classification
- Kingdom: Animalia
- Phylum: Arthropoda
- Clade: Pancrustacea
- Class: Insecta
- Order: Orthoptera
- Suborder: Caelifera
- Family: Acrididae
- Subfamily: Gomphocerinae
- Tribe: Chrysochraontini
- Genus: Podismopsis; Zubovski, 1900

Synonyms
- Eurasiobia Bey-Bienko, 1932; Podismacris Bey-Bienko, 1932

Genus of grasshoppers

External image
- Images at iNaturalist

Podismopsis is a genus of grasshoppers that belongs to the subfamily Gomphocerinae and tribe Chrysochraontini. Members of the genus have been recorded from central Europe through to temperate east Asia, including Japan.

== Taxonomy ==
The genus was erected in the year 1909 by N. Zubovski.

=== Species ===
The Orthoptera Species File lists:

1. Podismopsis altaica (Zubovski, 1900) - type species (as Chrysochraon altaica Zubovski)
2. Podismopsis amplimedius Zheng & Shi, 2010
3. Podismopsis amplipennis Zheng & Lian, 1988
4. Podismopsis ampliradiareas Zheng, Cao & Lian, 1991
5. Podismopsis angustipennis Zheng & Lian, 1988
6. Podismopsis aquamopennis Wang, 2007
7. Podismopsis bisonita Zheng, Cao & Lian, 1991
8. Podismopsis brachycaudata Zhang & Jin, 1985
9. Podismopsis dailingensis Zheng & Shi, 2010
10. Podismopsis dolichocerca Ren, Zhang & Zheng, 1994
11. Podismopsis frontalis Mistshenko, 1951
12. Podismopsis gelida Miram, 1931
13. Podismopsis genicularibus (Shiraki, 1910)
14. Podismopsis gynaemorpha Ikonnikov, 1911
15. Podismopsis humengensis Zheng & Lian, 1988
16. Podismopsis insularis Mistshenko, 1951
17. Podismopsis jacuta Miram, 1928
18. Podismopsis jinbensis Zheng, Cao & Lian, 1991
19. Podismopsis juxtapennis Zheng & Lian, 1988
20. Podismopsis keisti (Nadig, 1989)
21. Podismopsis konakovi Bey-Bienko, 1948
22. Podismopsis kristini Marhoul, Vlk & Holuša 2026
23. Podismopsis mongolica Bey-Bienko, 1959
24. Podismopsis mudanjiangensis Ren, Zhang & Zheng, 1994
25. Podismopsis planicaudata Liang & Jia, 1994
26. Podismopsis poppiusi (Miram, 1907) (two subspecies)
27. Podismopsis quadrasonita Zhang & Jin, 1985
28. Podismopsis relicta Ramme, 1931
29. Podismopsis rufipes Ren, Zhang & Zheng, 1991
30. Podismopsis shareiensis Shiraki, 1930
31. Podismopsis silvestris Storozhenko, 1986
32. Podismopsis sinucarinata Zheng & Lian, 1988
33. Podismopsis squamopennis Lu, Wang & Ren, 2011
34. Podismopsis styriaca Koschuh, 2008
35. Podismopsis transsylvanica Ramme, 1951
36. Podismopsis tumenlingensis Zhang & Ren, 1992
37. Podismopsis tuqiangensis Zheng & Shi, 2010
38. Podismopsis ussuriensis Ikonnikov, 1911 (two subspecies)
39. Podismopsis viridis Ren, Zhang & Zheng, 1994
40. Podismopsis yurii Storozhenko, 2006
