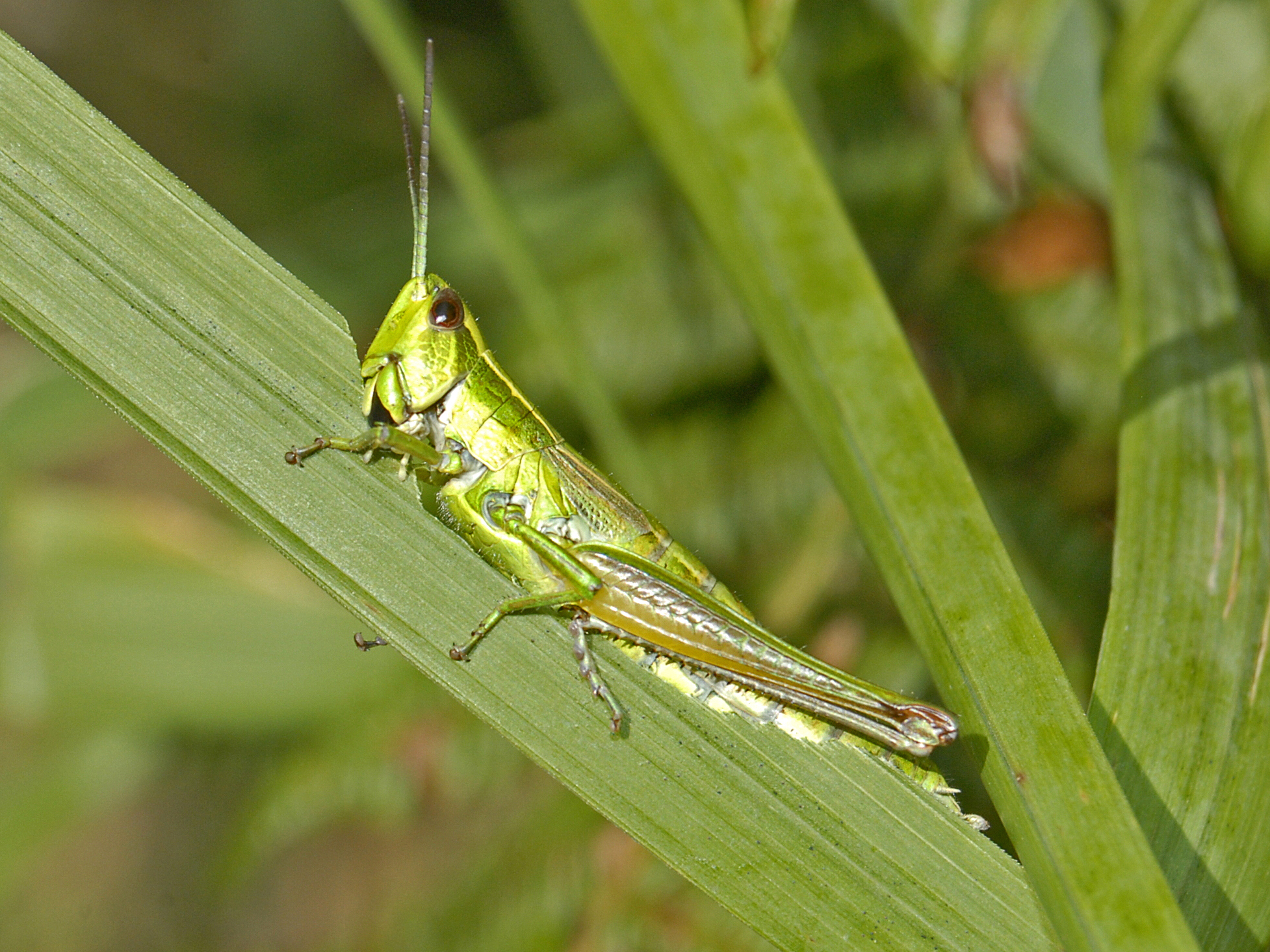
- Female of Euthystira brachyptera

Scientific classification
- Kingdom: Animalia
- Phylum: Arthropoda
- Clade: Pancrustacea
- Class: Insecta
- Order: Orthoptera
- Suborder: Caelifera
- Family: Acrididae
- Genus: Euthystira
- Species: E. brachyptera

Binomial name
- Euthystira brachyptera (Ocskay, 1826)

Synonyms
- Euthystira abbreviatum (Herrich-Schäffer, 1840); Euthystira longicrus (Fischer von Waldheim, 1846); Euthystira ocskayi (Fischer von Waldheim, 1846); Euthystira smaragdulum (Herrich-Schäffer, 1840); Euthystira chrysoberyllus (Fruhstorfer, 1921); Euthystira homoptera (Eversmann, 1848); Euthystira leucoptera (Fischer von Waldheim, 1846); Euthystira ocskayi (Fieber, 1853); Euthystira subcaerulea (Puschnig, 1910)

= Euthystira brachyptera =

Species of grasshopper

Sound of Euthystira brachyptera
Field recording in the Netherlands 22s

Euthystira brachyptera, the small gold grasshopper, is a species of grasshopper belonging to the family Acrididae.

== Subspecies ==
- Euthystira brachyptera brachyptera (Ocskay, 1826)
- Euthystira brachyptera intermedia (Bolivar, I., 1897)

== Description ==
Euthystira brachyptera can reach a length of 13–26 millimetres (0.51–1.02 in) with females tending to be larger. The body color is shiny yellow-green. The wings of the males reach the center of the abdomen, while the wings of the females are very small and often pink or purple. This species could be confused with Euchorthippus declivus and Chrysochraon dispar. It can be distinguished by means of the sharper top of head and the proportionally smaller eyes. Adults can be found from July to September.

Close-Up of a Euthystira brachyptera

== Distribution and habitat ==
This species is present in most of Europe, in the eastern Palearctic realm, and in the Near East. It prefers mountain and subalpine meadows with tall grasses, heaths with rough vegetation and woodland clearings. It is quite common in calcareous grasslands with Brachypodium pinnatum.
