= Heteropterus =

Heteropterus has been used for:

- Heteropterus (butterfly) Duméril, 1806, a genus of butterflies in the family Hesperiidae
- Heteropterus Wang, 1992 (a grasshopper), is a synonym for genus Mongolotettix Rehn, 1928
