= Megaulacobothrus latipennis =

Scientific classification
- Domain: Eukaryota
- Kingdom: Animalia
- Phylum: Arthropoda
- Class: Insecta
- Order: Orthoptera
- Suborder: Caelifera
- Family: Acrididae
- Subfamily: Gomphocerinae
- Tribe: Stenobothrini
- Genus: Megaulacobothrus
- Species: M. latipennis

Binomial name
- Megaulacobothrus latipennis Ignacio Bolívar, 1898

Species of grasshopper

Megaulacobothrus latipennis is a species of grasshopper classified under the subfamily Gomphocerinae, recorded from Japan, Korea and Taiwan. The scientific name of this species was published for the first time in 1898 by Bolívar.
