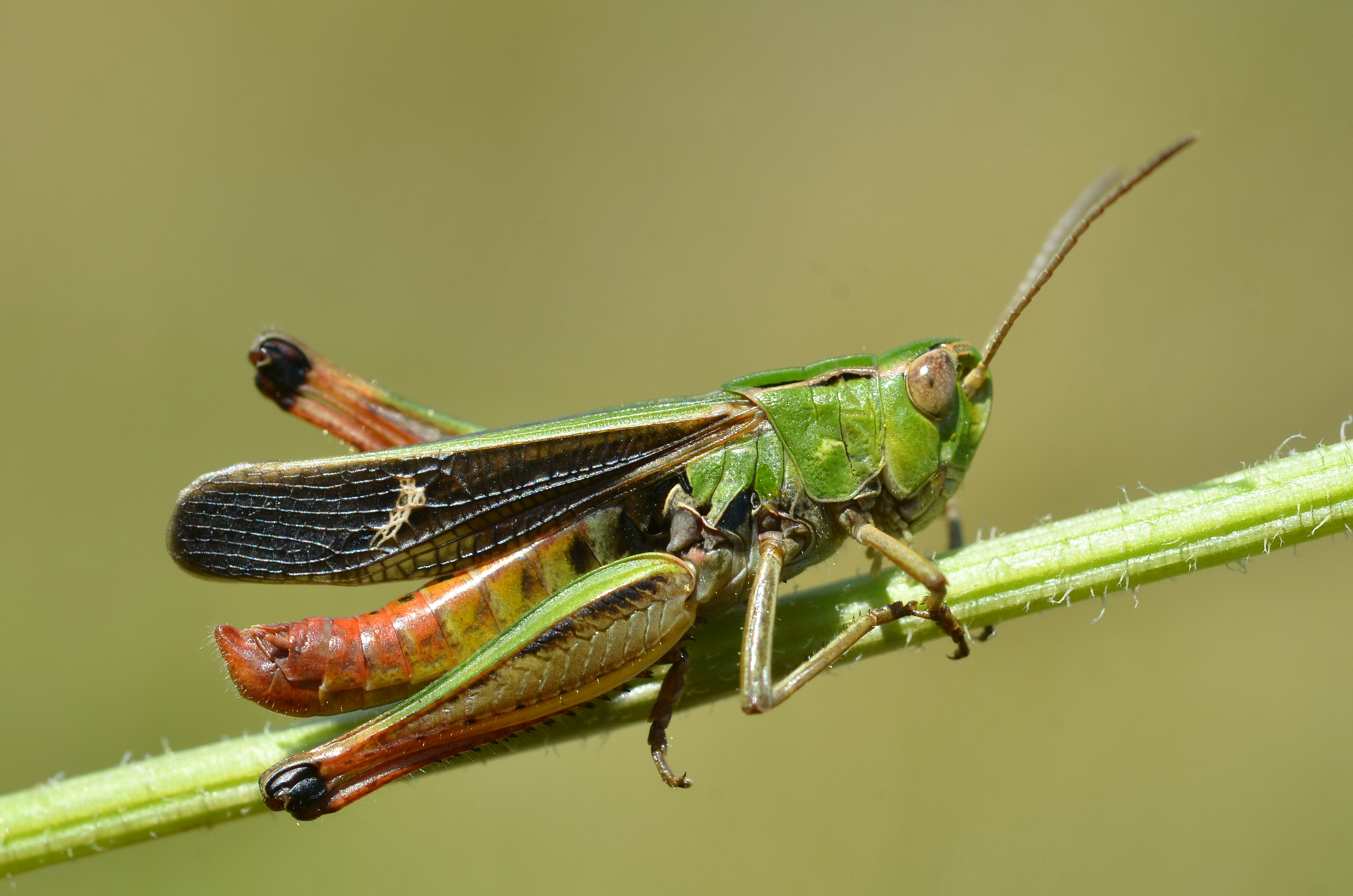
- Stenobothrus lineatus male

Scientific classification
- Domain: Eukaryota
- Kingdom: Animalia
- Phylum: Arthropoda
- Class: Insecta
- Order: Orthoptera
- Suborder: Caelifera
- Family: Acrididae
- Tribe: Stenobothrini
- Genus: Stenobothrus; Fischer, 1853

= Stenobothrus =

Genus of grasshoppers

Stenobothrus is a genus of grasshoppers found in Asia, Europe, and North Africa.

== Species ==
Species include:

- Stenobothrus amoenus (Brisout de Barneville, 1850)
- Stenobothrus apenninus Ebner, 1915
- Stenobothrus berberus Uvarov, 1942
- Stenobothrus bolivarii (Brunner von Wattenwyl, 1876)
- Stenobothrus bozcuki Çiplak, 1994
- Stenobothrus burri Karabag, 1953
- Stenobothrus carbonarius (Eversmann, 1848)
- Stenobothrus caucasicus Dovnar-Zapolskij, 1927
- Stenobothrus clavatus Willemse, 1979
- Stenobothrus cobresianus Bey-Bienko, 1949
- Stenobothrus cotticus Kruseman & Jeekel, 1967
- Stenobothrus crassipes (Charpentier, 1825)
- Stenobothrus croaticus Ramme, 1933
- Stenobothrus derrai Harz, 1988
- Stenobothrus divergentivus Shiraki, 1910
- Stenobothrus eurasius Zubovski, 1898
- Stenobothrus festivus Bolívar, 1887
- Stenobothrus fischeri (Eversmann, 1848)
- Stenobothrus formosanus Shiraki, 1910
- Stenobothrus fumatus Shiraki, 1910
- Stenobothrus graecus Ramme, 1926
- Stenobothrus grammicus Cazurro y Ruiz, 1888
- Stenobothrus kirgisorum Ikonnikov, 1911
- Stenobothrus limosus Walker, 1870
- Stenobothrus lineatus (Panzer, 1796)
- Stenobothrus magnus Shiraki, 1910
- Stenobothrus maroccanus Uvarov, 1942
- Stenobothrus minor Shiraki, 1910
- Stenobothrus minutissimus Bolívar, 1878
- Stenobothrus miramae Dirsh, 1931
- Stenobothrus mistshenkoi Woznessenskij, 1998
- Stenobothrus newskii Zubovski, 1900
- Stenobothrus nigromaculatus (Herrich-Schäffer, 1840)
- Stenobothrus olgaephilus Storozhenko, 1985
- Stenobothrus palpalis Uvarov, 1927
- †Stenobothrus posthumoides Zeuner, 1934
- Stenobothrus posthumus Ramme, 1931
- Stenobothrus rubicundulus Kruseman & Jeekel, 1967
- Stenobothrus selmae Ünal, 1999
- Stenobothrus stigmaticus (Rambur, 1838)
- Stenobothrus subrufescens Walker, 1871
- Stenobothrus sviridenkoi Ramme, 1930
- Stenobothrus tadzhicus Mistshenko, 1951
- Stenobothrus umbrifer Walker, 1871
- Stenobothrus ursulae Nadig, 1986
- Stenobothrus weidneri (Demirsoy, 1977)
- Stenobothrus werneri Adelung, 1907
- Stenobothrus zubowskyi Bolívar, 1899
