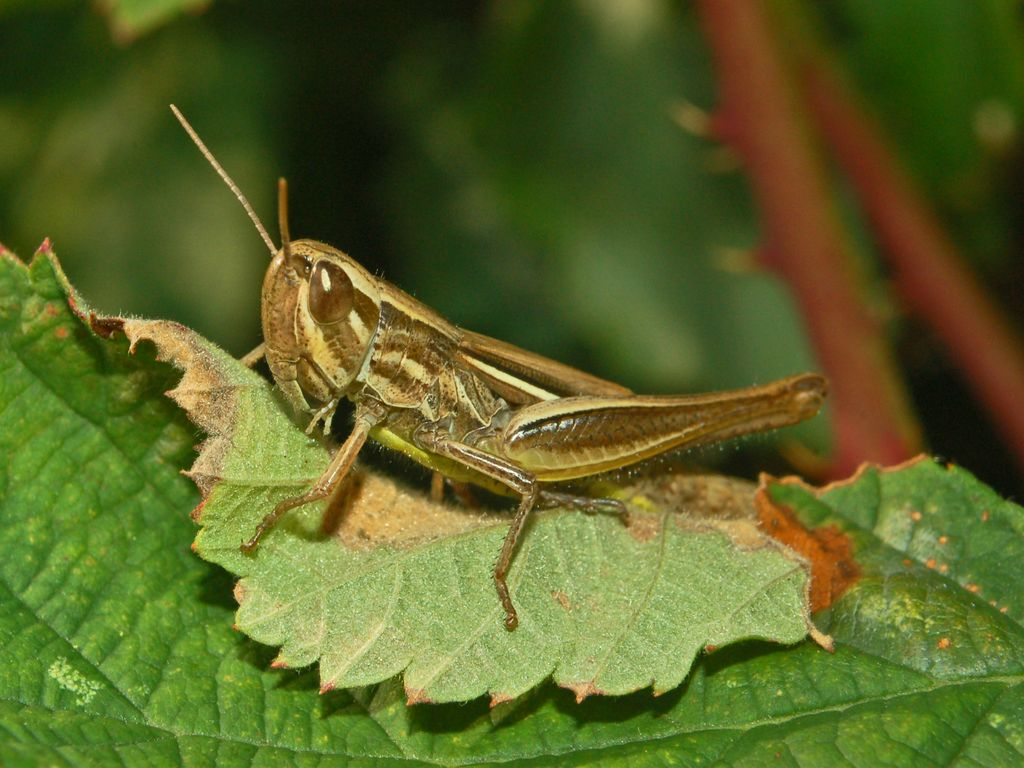
- Euchorthippus declivus

Scientific classification
- Domain: Eukaryota
- Kingdom: Animalia
- Phylum: Arthropoda
- Class: Insecta
- Order: Orthoptera
- Suborder: Caelifera
- Family: Acrididae
- Tribe: Chrysochraontini
- Genus: Euchorthippus; Tarbinsky, 1926

= Euchorthippus =

Genus of grasshoppers

Euchorthippus is a genus of short-horned grasshoppers belonging to the family Acrididae and the subfamily Gomphocerinae. Species are recorded from Europe and temperate Asia.

== Species ==
The Orthoptera Species File lists:

- Euchorthippus acarinatus Zheng, Z. & D. He, 1993
- Euchorthippus albolineatus (Lucas, 1849)
- Euchorthippus angustulus Ramme, 1931
- Euchorthippus aquatilis Zhang, F., 1994
- Euchorthippus arabicus Uvarov, 1952
- Euchorthippus changlingensis Ren, Bingzhong & Zhao, 2001
- Euchorthippus chenbaensis Tu & Z. Zheng, 1964
- Euchorthippus cheui Hsia, 1964
- Euchorthippus chopardi Descamps, 1968
- Euchorthippus choui Zheng, Z., 1980
- Euchorthippus dahinganlingensis Zhang, F. & Bingzhong Ren, 1992
- Euchorthippus declivus (Brisout, 1848)
- Euchorthippus elegantulus Zeuner, 1940
- Euchorthippus flexucarinatus Bi, D. & Hsia, 1987
- Euchorthippus fusigeniculatus Jin, Xingbao & F. Zhang, 1983
- Euchorthippus herbaceus Zhang, F. & Xingbao Jin, 1985
- Euchorthippus liupanshanensis Zheng, Z. & D. He, 1993
- Euchorthippus madeirae Uvarov, 1935
- Euchorthippus nigrilineatus Zheng, Z. & X. Wang, 1993
- Euchorthippus pulvinatus (Fischer-Waldheim, 1846)
- Euchorthippus ravus Liang & F.L. Jia, 1992
- Euchorthippus sardous Nadig, 1934
- Euchorthippus sinucarinatus Zheng, Z. & X. Wang, 1993
- Euchorthippus transcaucasicus Tarbinsky, 1930
- Euchorthippus unicolor (Ikonnikov, 1913)
- Euchorthippus vittatus Zheng, Z., 1980
- Euchorthippus weichowensis Chang, K.S.F., 1937
- Euchorthippus yungningensis Tu & Z. Zheng, 1964
- Euchorthippus zhongtiaoshanensis Zheng, Z. & R. Lu, 2002
- Euchorthippus zuojianus Zhang, F. & Bingzhong Ren, 1993
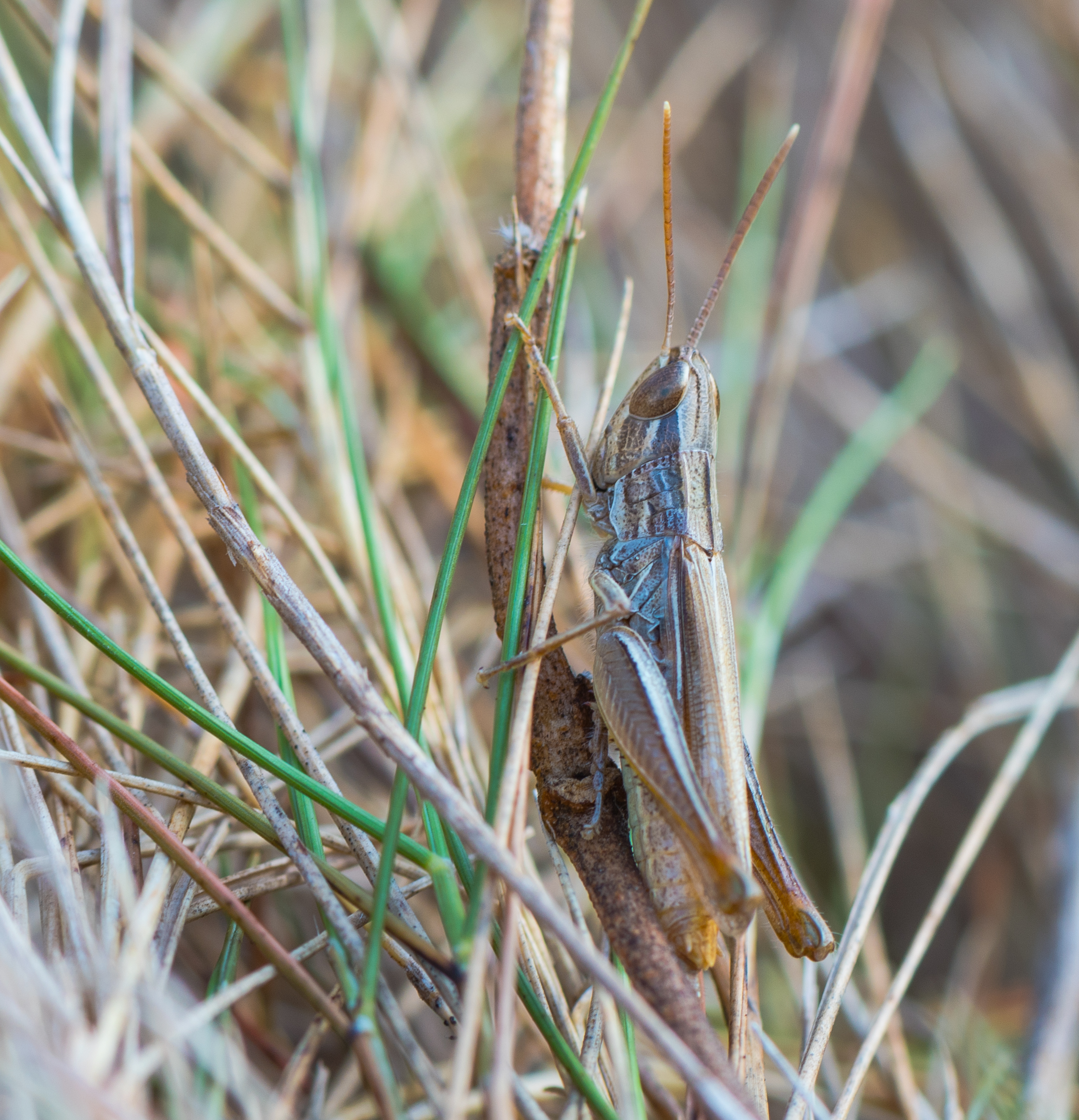
Euchorthippus chopardi

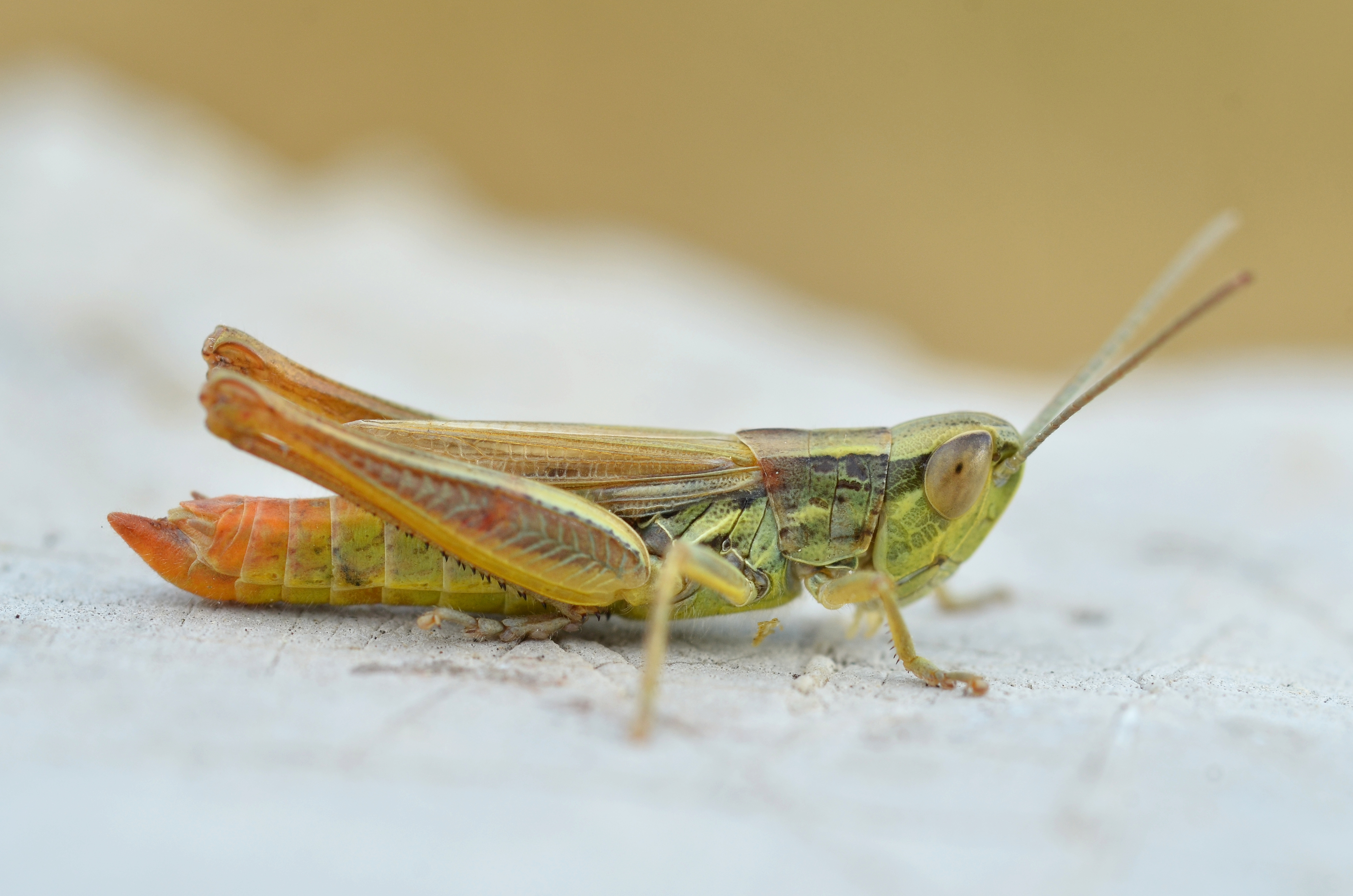
Euchorthippus declivus

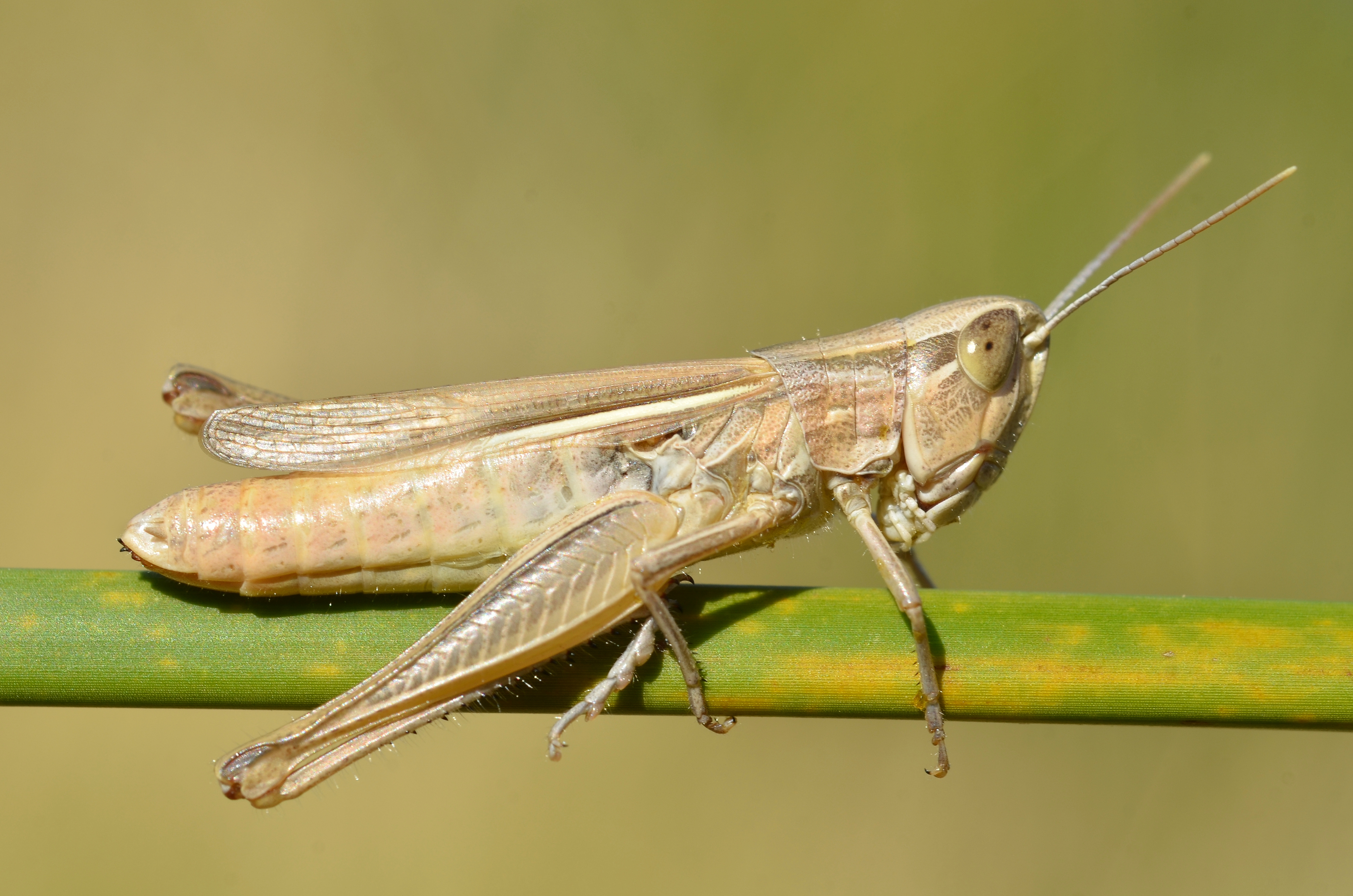
Euchorthippus pulvinatus
