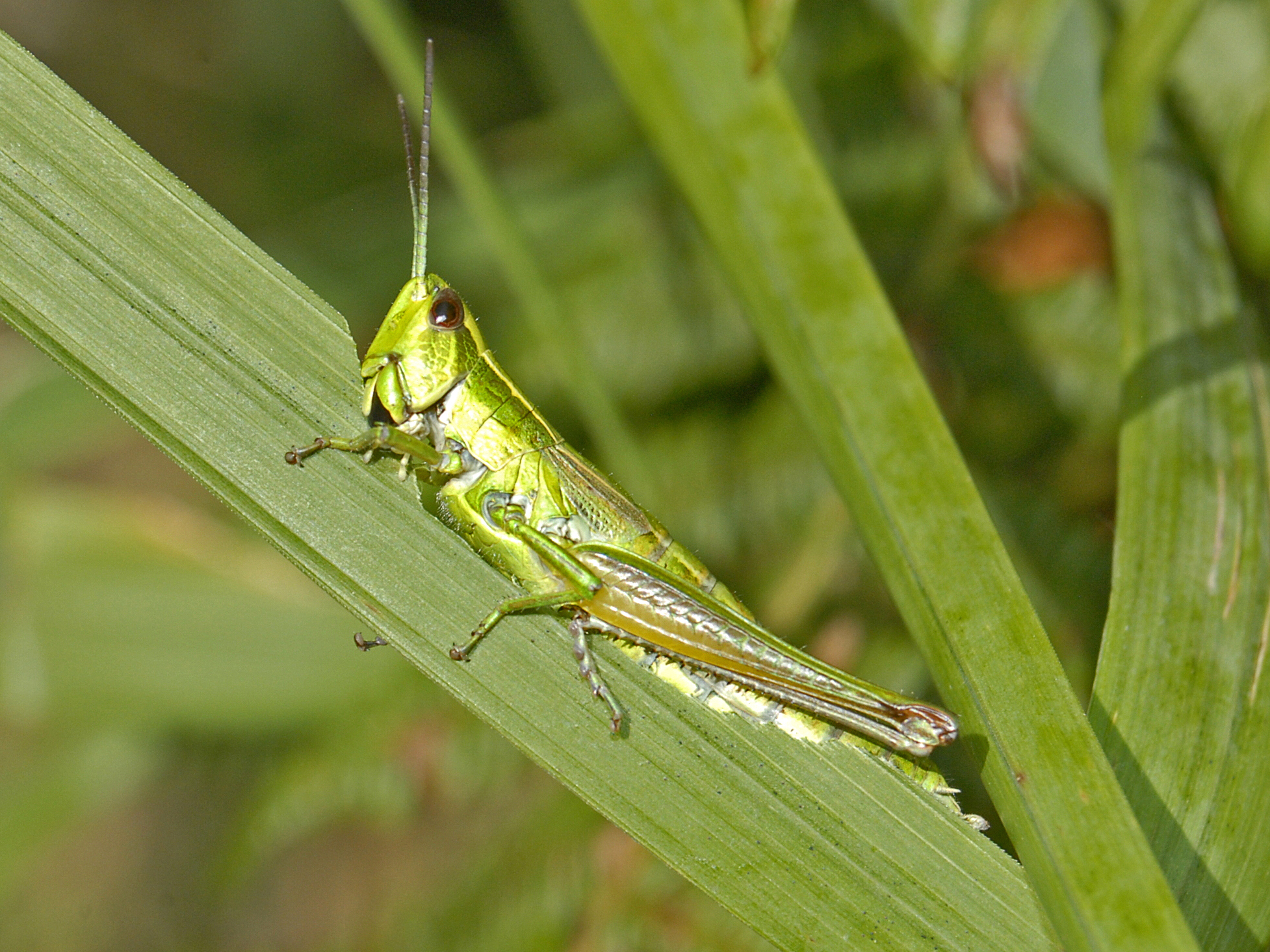
- Euthystira brachyptera

Scientific classification
- Kingdom: Animalia
- Phylum: Arthropoda
- Clade: Pancrustacea
- Class: Insecta
- Order: Orthoptera
- Suborder: Caelifera
- Family: Acrididae
- Subfamily: Gomphocerinae
- Tribe: Chrysochraontini
- Genus: Euthystira; Fieber, 1852

= Euthystira =

Genus of grasshoppers

Euthystira is a genus of grasshoppers belonging to the family Acrididae.

== Species ==
Species recognized by Orthoptera Species File:

- Euthystira brachyptera (Ocskay, 1826) - small gold grasshopper
- Euthystira luteifemora Zhang, F., Yiping Zheng & Bingzhong Ren, 1995
- Euthystira pavlovskii Bey-Bienko, 1954
- Euthystira xinyuanensis Liu, Jupeng, 1981
- Euthystira yuzhongensis Zheng, Z., 1984
