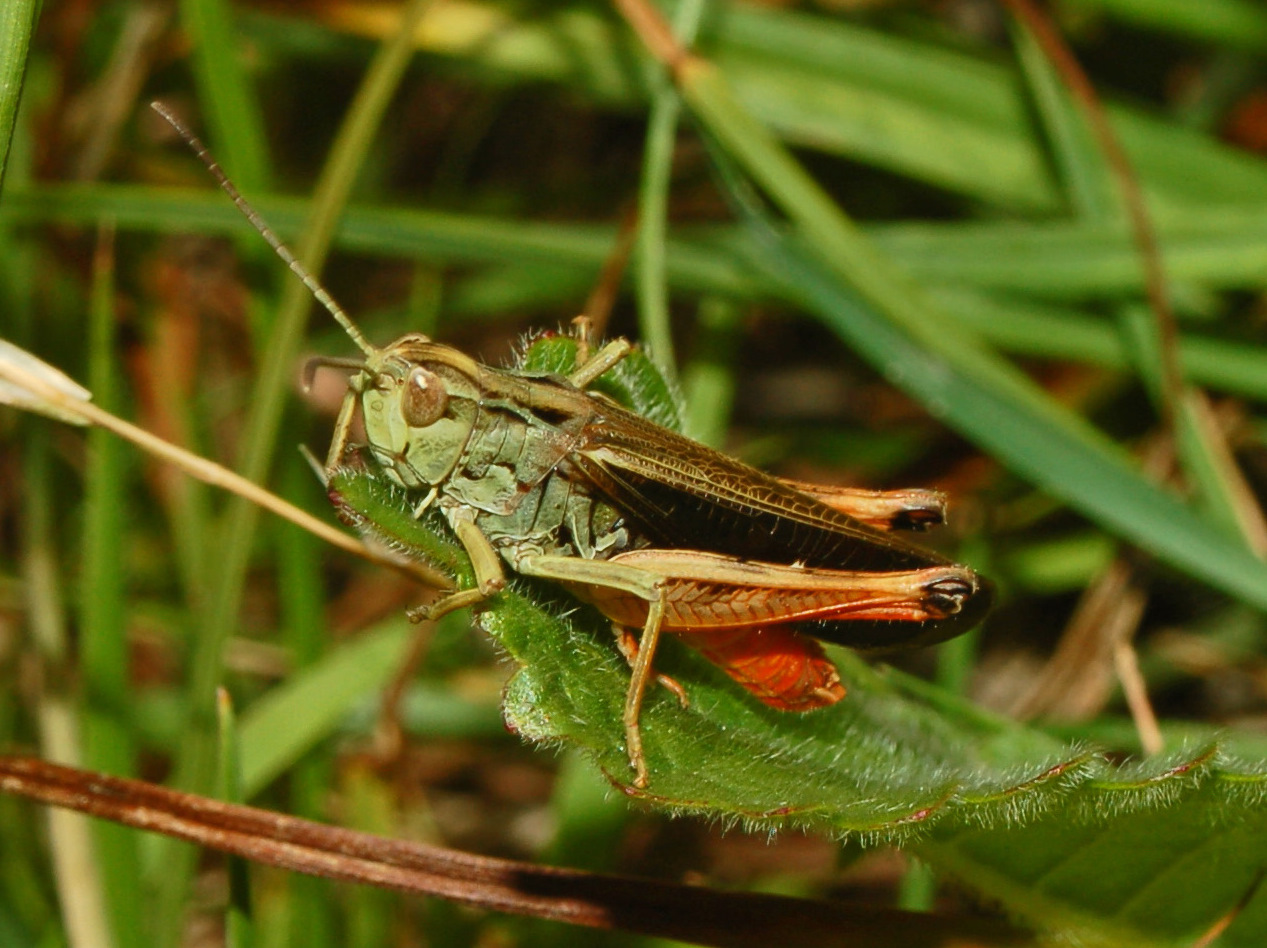
- Stenobothrus cf. rubicundulus

Scientific classification
- Kingdom: Animalia
- Phylum: Arthropoda
- Class: Insecta
- Order: Orthoptera
- Suborder: Caelifera
- Family: Acrididae
- Genus: Stenobothrus
- Species: S. rubicundulus

Binomial name
- Stenobothrus rubicundulus Kruseman & Jeekel, 1967

Synonyms
- Gryllus miniatus Charpentier, 1825; Gryllus rubicundus Germar, 1817; Stenobothrus miniatus (Charpentier, 1825); Stenobothrus rubicundus (Germar, 1817)

= Stenobothrus rubicundulus =

Species of grasshopper

Stenobothrus rubicundulus, the wing-buzzing grasshopper, is a species of short-horned grasshoppers in the family Acrididae.

== Description ==
Stenobothrus rubicundulus has a pronotum length of about 3–4 millimetres (0.12–0.16 in), a tegmen length of about 11–13 millimetres (0.43–0.51 in) and a hind femur length of about 9–11 millimetres (0.35–0.43 in). Body is mainly green, while abdomen and hind femurs are orange-reddish. Wings are dark brown and broadened, with harshly sclerotised veins. Males are quite good fliers. Adults can be found from July to early October feeding on grasses and herbs. These grasshoppers produce sounds by wing vibration (crepitation) and by stridulation.

Close-Up of a Stenobothrus rubicundulus

== Distribution ==
This species mainly occurs in Central Europe, especially in the Central and Southern Alps. It is present in Austria, Bosnia, Bulgaria, Croatia, France, Greece, Italy, North Macedonia, Romania, Serbia, Slovenia and Switzerland.

== Habitat ==
These grasshoppers are a mainly montane species with a wide temperature tolerance. They prefer dry and rocky slopes and stony meadows within the open forest, at an elevation of 1,000–2,500 metres (3,300–8,200 ft) above sea level.
