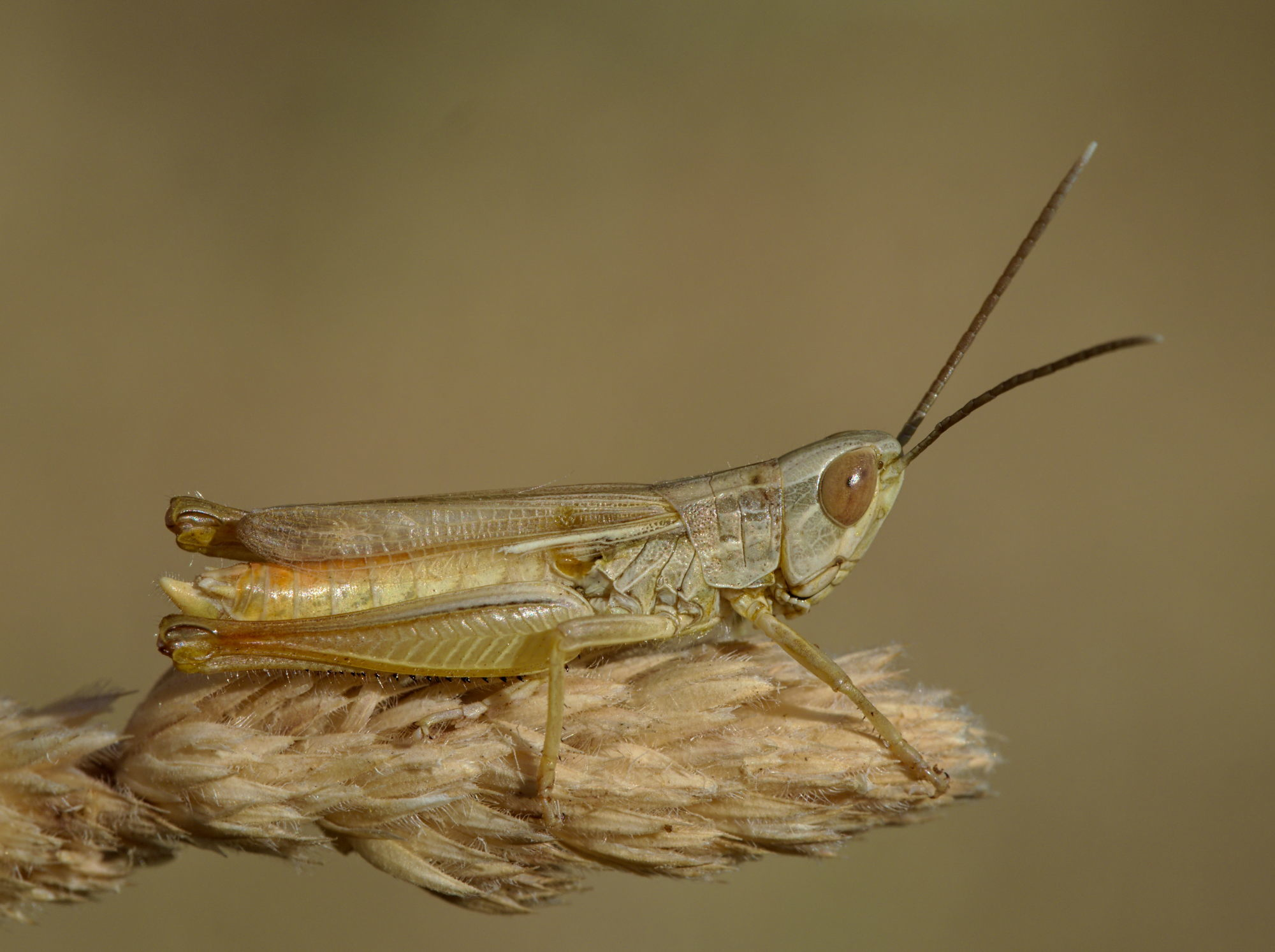
- Euchorthippus elegantulus, France

Conservation status
- Least Concern (IUCN 3.1)

Scientific classification
- Domain: Eukaryota
- Kingdom: Animalia
- Phylum: Arthropoda
- Class: Insecta
- Order: Orthoptera
- Suborder: Caelifera
- Family: Acrididae
- Genus: Euchorthippus
- Species: E. elegantulus

Binomial name
- Euchorthippus elegantulus Zeuner, 1940

= Euchorthippus elegantulus =

Species of slant-faced grasshopper

Euchorthippus elegantulus is a species of slant-faced grasshopper in the family Acrididae. It is found in Europe.

The IUCN conservation status of Euchorthippus elegantulus is "LC", least concern, with no immediate threat to the species' survival. The IUCN status was assessed in 2015.

== Subspecies ==
These subspecies belong to the species Euchorthippus elegantulus:

- Euchorthippus elegantulus elegantulus Zeuner, 1940 (Elegant Straw Grasshopper)
- Euchorthippus elegantulus gallicus Maran, 1957
