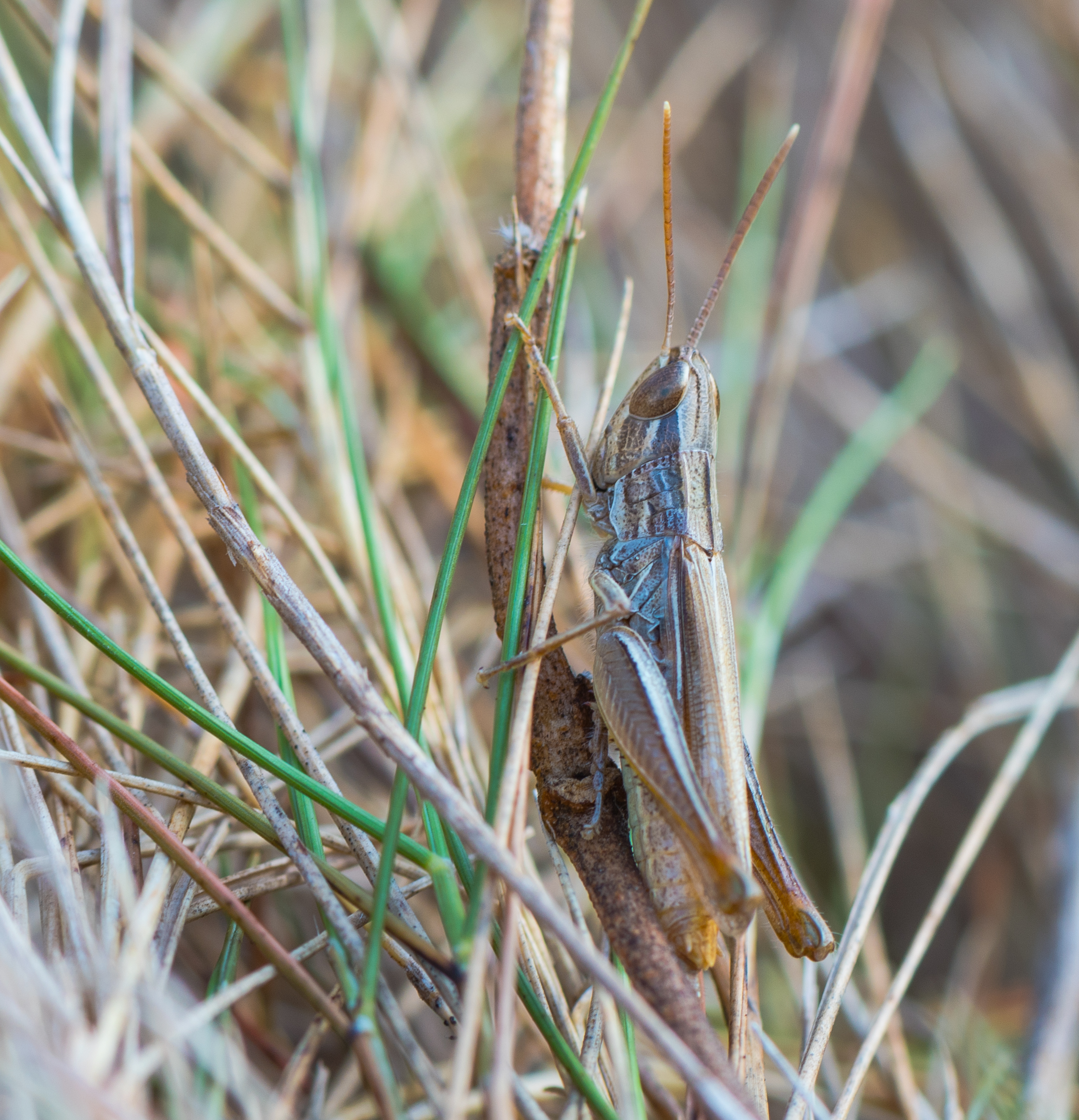
- Euchorthippus chopardi, Iberian straw grasshopper, France

Conservation status
- Least Concern (IUCN 3.1)

Scientific classification
- Domain: Eukaryota
- Kingdom: Animalia
- Phylum: Arthropoda
- Class: Insecta
- Order: Orthoptera
- Suborder: Caelifera
- Family: Acrididae
- Genus: Euchorthippus
- Species: E. chopardi

Binomial name
- Euchorthippus chopardi Descamps, 1968

= Euchorthippus chopardi =

Species of grasshopper

Euchorthippus chopardi, the Iberian straw grasshopper, is a species of slant-faced grasshopper in the family Acrididae. It is found in Europe.

The IUCN conservation status of Euchorthippus chopardi is "LC", least concern, with no immediate threat to the species' survival. The IUCN status was assessed in 2015.
