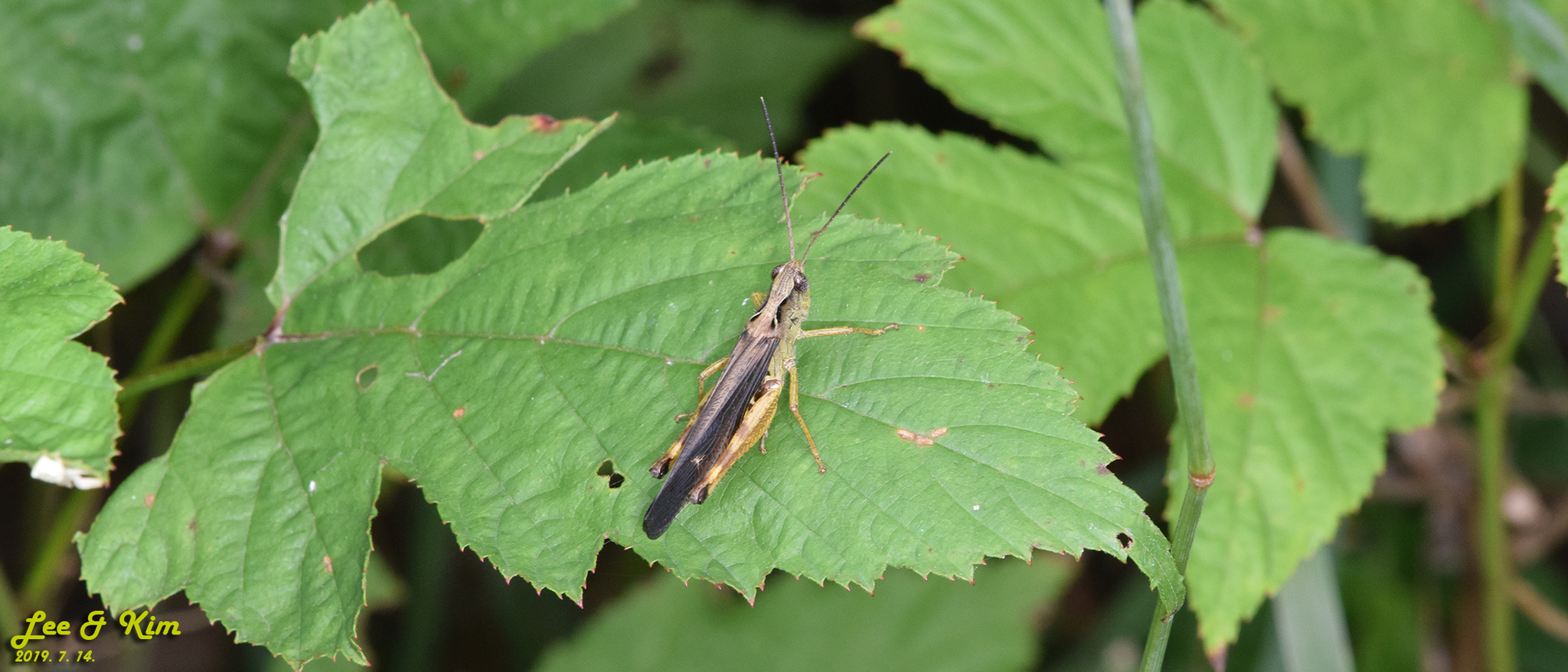
- Megaulacobothrus aethalinus

Scientific classification
- Domain: Eukaryota
- Kingdom: Animalia
- Phylum: Arthropoda
- Class: Insecta
- Order: Orthoptera
- Suborder: Caelifera
- Superfamily: Acridoidea
- Family: Acrididae
- Subfamily: Gomphocerinae
- Tribe: Stenobothrini
- Genus: Megaulacobothrus; Caudell, 1921

Synonyms
- Magaulacobothrus Yin, Ye & Yin, 2014; Magulacobothrus Zheng, Bai & Xu, 2012

= Megaulacobothrus =

Genus of grasshoppers

Megaulacobothrus is a genus of grasshoppers in the tribe Stenobothrini. Species have been recorded from northern and Temperate Asia.

== Species ==
The Orthoptera Species File lists:

- Megaulacobothrus aethalinus Zubovski, 1899
- Megaulacobothrus barbipes Zheng, Lin & Shi, 2012
- Megaulacobothrus chinensis (Tarbinsky, 1927)
- Megaulacobothrus ewenkensis Zheng, Lin & Shi, 2012
- Megaulacobothrus flexivenus (Liu, 1981)
- Megaulacobothrus fuscipennis Caudell, 1921 - type species (locality Zhejiang, China)
- Megaulacobothrus fuscipennoides Ma, Zheng & Guo, 2000
- Megaulacobothrus hunanensis Wei & Yin, 1986
- Megaulacobothrus jejuensis Kim, 2008
- Megaulacobothrus latipennis (Bolívar, 1898)
- Megaulacobothrus liaoningensis Zheng, 1988
- Megaulacobothrus longisonus Li & Yin, 1987
- Megaulacobothrus maerkangensis Zheng, 1980
- Megaulacobothrus minutus Zhang, 1990
- Megaulacobothrus multipegus Wei & Yin, 1986
- Megaulacobothrus rufitibis Zheng, 1989
- Megaulacobothrus shenmuensis Zheng & Ren, 1993
- Megaulacobothrus tianshanensis (Zheng, Ma & Ren, 2009)
- Megaulacobothrus xiangchengensis Liu, 1985
- Megaulacobothrus yuanshanensis Zheng, 1980
