= Stenobothrus festivus =

Festive toothed grasshopper

Conservation status
- Least Concern (IUCN 3.1)

Scientific classification
- Domain: Eukaryota
- Kingdom: Animalia
- Phylum: Arthropoda
- Class: Insecta
- Order: Orthoptera
- Suborder: Caelifera
- Family: Acrididae
- Genus: Stenobothrus
- Species: S. festivus

Binomial name
- Stenobothrus festivus Bolívar, 1887

Species of grasshopper

Stenobothrus festivus, commonly known as the festive toothed grasshopper, is a species of insect in the family Acrididae. It is found in Portugal, Spain and France.
