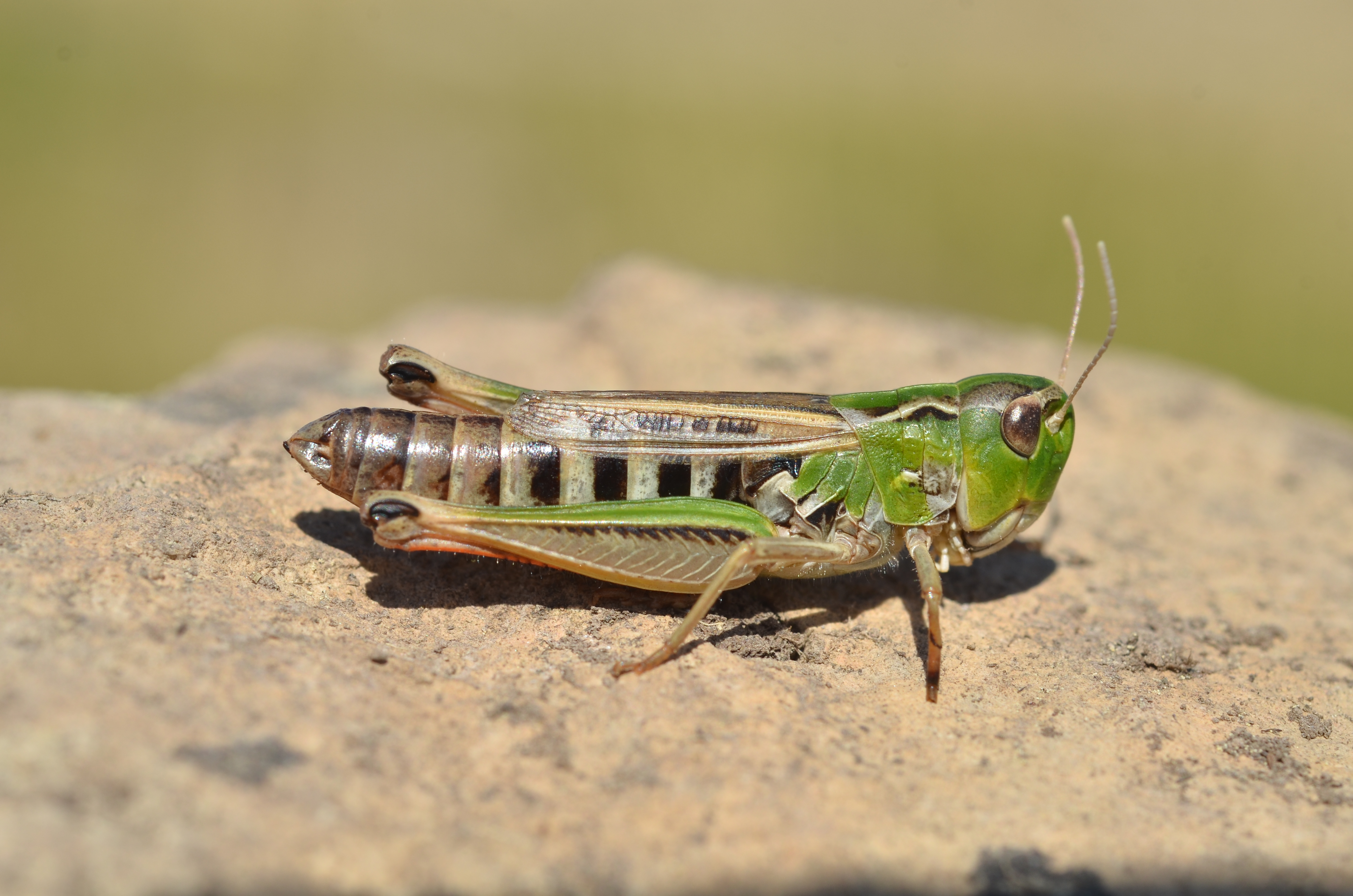
- Female

Scientific classification
- Kingdom: Animalia
- Phylum: Arthropoda
- Clade: Pancrustacea
- Class: Insecta
- Order: Orthoptera
- Suborder: Caelifera
- Family: Acrididae
- Genus: Stenobothrus
- Species: S. nigromaculatus

Binomial name
- Stenobothrus nigromaculatus (Herrich-Schaffer, 1840)

Audio
- Song

= Stenobothrus nigromaculatus =

Species of grasshopper

Stenobothrus nigromaculatus is a species belonging to the family Acrididae. It is found across the Palearctic. In Europe it occurs locally in Germany, France, Spain, Portugal, Italy (in the Alps and the Apennines), the Czech Republic, Poland, Switzerland, Austria, Yugoslavia, Romania, Bulgaria and the north of Greece. Further east, the occurrence extends over Asia Minor and the Caucasus to Siberia. In Germany, the species prefers at altitudes between 250 and 900 meters, but it was also found in the Allgäu to an altitude of almost 1500 meters. In Switzerland it is found at altitudes from 500 to 2270 meters.

Close-up of a Stenobothrus nigromaculatus
