= Stenobothrus eurasius =

Conservation status
- Vulnerable (IUCN 2.3)

Scientific classification
- Kingdom: Animalia
- Phylum: Arthropoda
- Class: Insecta
- Order: Orthoptera
- Suborder: Caelifera
- Family: Acrididae
- Genus: Stenobothrus
- Species: S. eurasius

Binomial name
- Stenobothrus eurasius Zubovskii, 1898

Synonyms
- Stenobothrodes eurasius Zubovskii, 1898 [orth. error]

Species of grasshopper

Stenobothrus eurasius is a species of insect in the family Acrididae. It is found in Hungary and Romania.

Close-Up of a Stenobothrus eurasius
