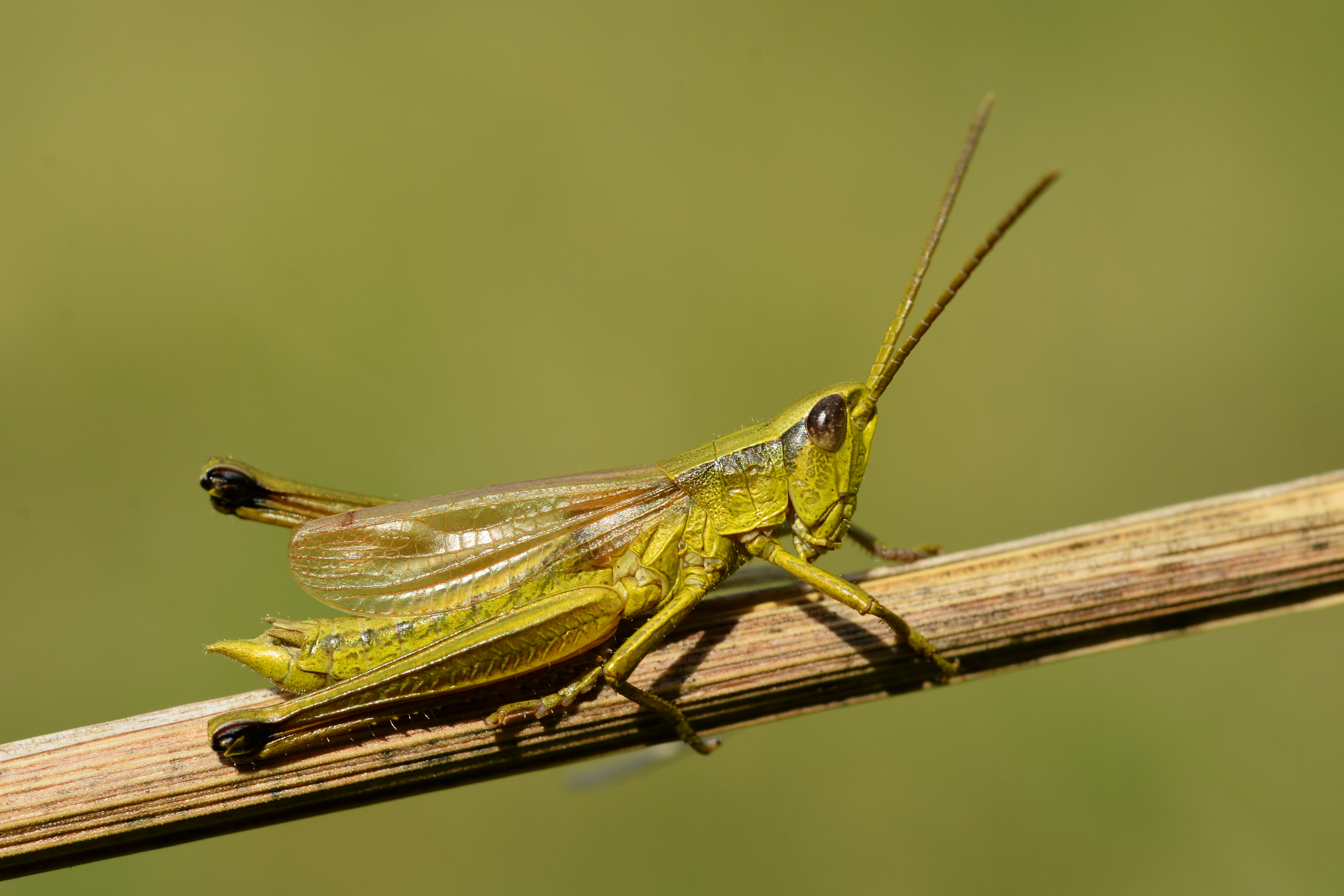
- Chrysochraon dispar male Belgium

Scientific classification
- Kingdom: Animalia
- Phylum: Arthropoda
- Clade: Pancrustacea
- Class: Insecta
- Order: Orthoptera
- Suborder: Caelifera
- Family: Acrididae
- Genus: Chrysochraon
- Species: C. dispar

Binomial name
- Chrysochraon dispar (Germar, 1831)

= Chrysochraon dispar =

Species of grasshopper

Chrysochraon dispar is a species belonging to the family Acrididae subfamily Gomphocerinae. It is found across the Palearctic east to Siberia.

Close-Up of a Chrysochraon dispar
