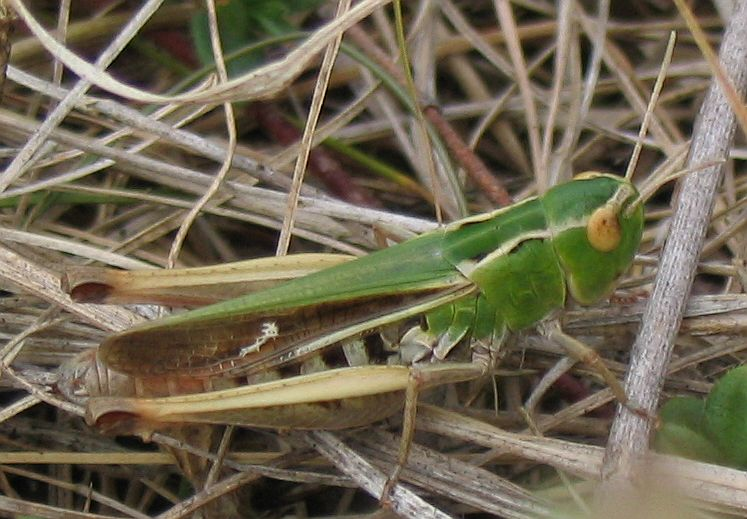
- Stenobothrus lineatus

Conservation status
- Least Concern (IUCN 3.1) (Europe regional assessment)

Scientific classification
- Kingdom: Animalia
- Phylum: Arthropoda
- Class: Insecta
- Order: Orthoptera
- Suborder: Caelifera
- Family: Acrididae
- Subfamily: Gomphocerinae
- Tribe: Stenobothrini
- Genus: Stenobothrus
- Species: S. lineatus

Binomial name
- Stenobothrus lineatus (Panzer, 1796)

Synonyms
- Gryllus lineatus Panzer, 1796

= Stenobothrus lineatus =

Species of grasshopper

Stenobothrus lineatus is usually called the stripe-winged grasshopper: it is a species of grasshoppers (Orthoptera: Caelifera) in the family Acrididae.

== Subspecies ==
Two subspecies are recorded:

- S. l. lineatus
- S. l. flavotibialis

Close-Up of a Stenobothrus lineatus

== Gallery ==
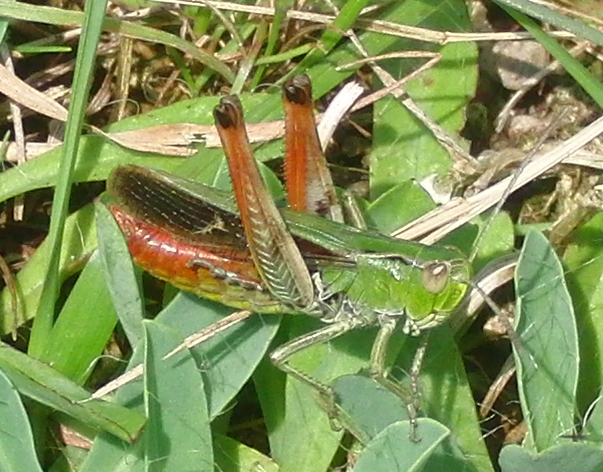

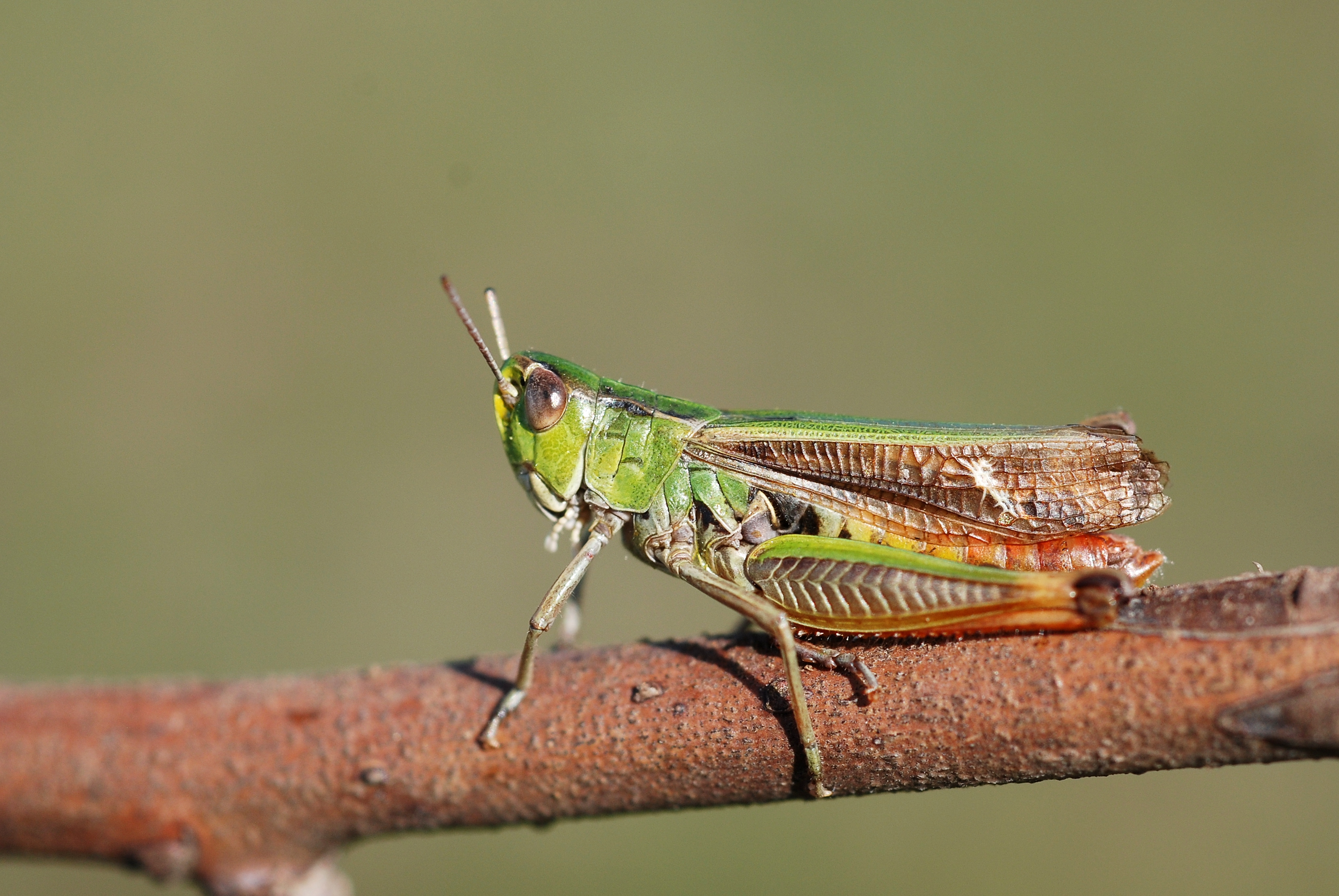

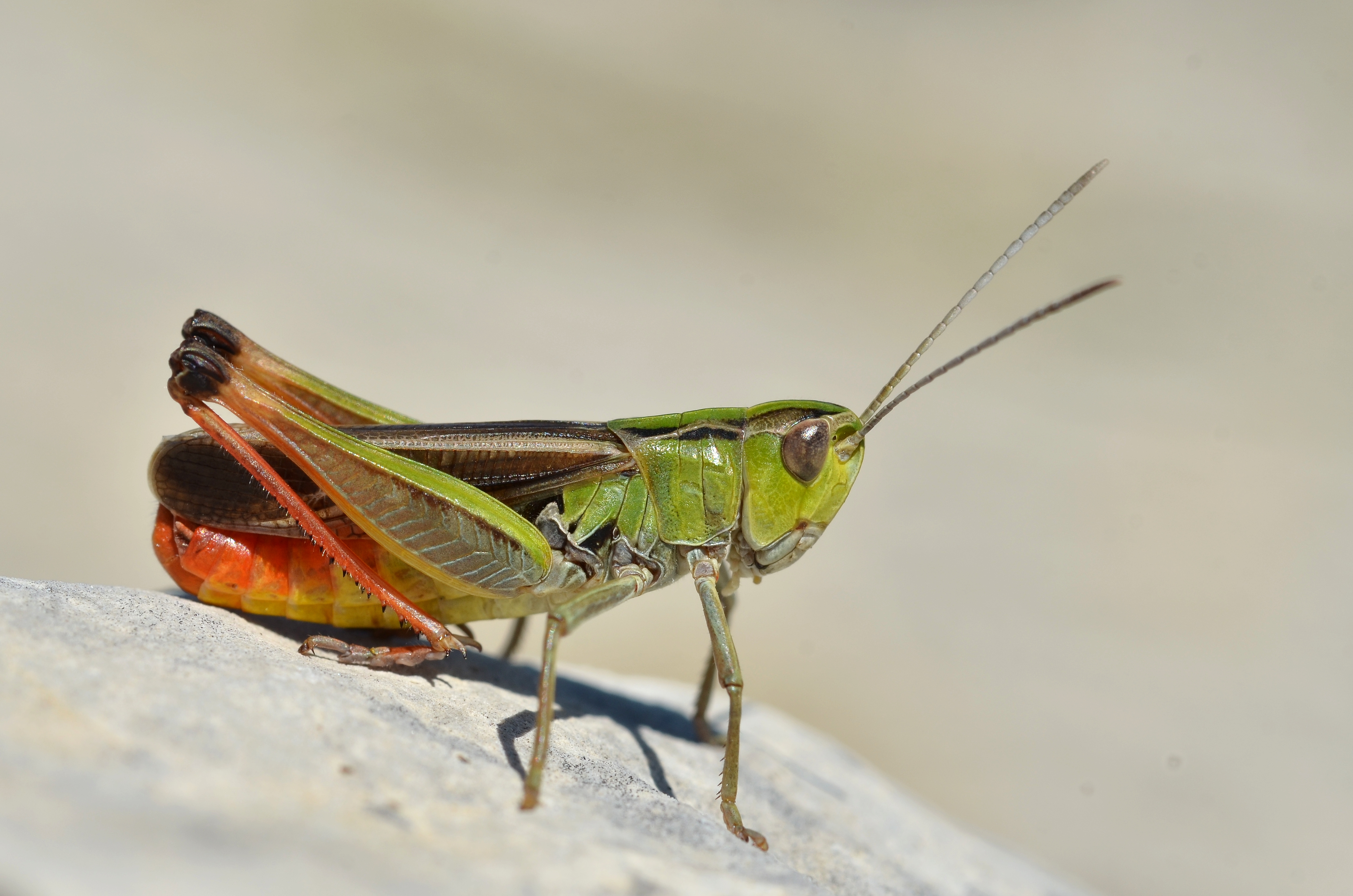

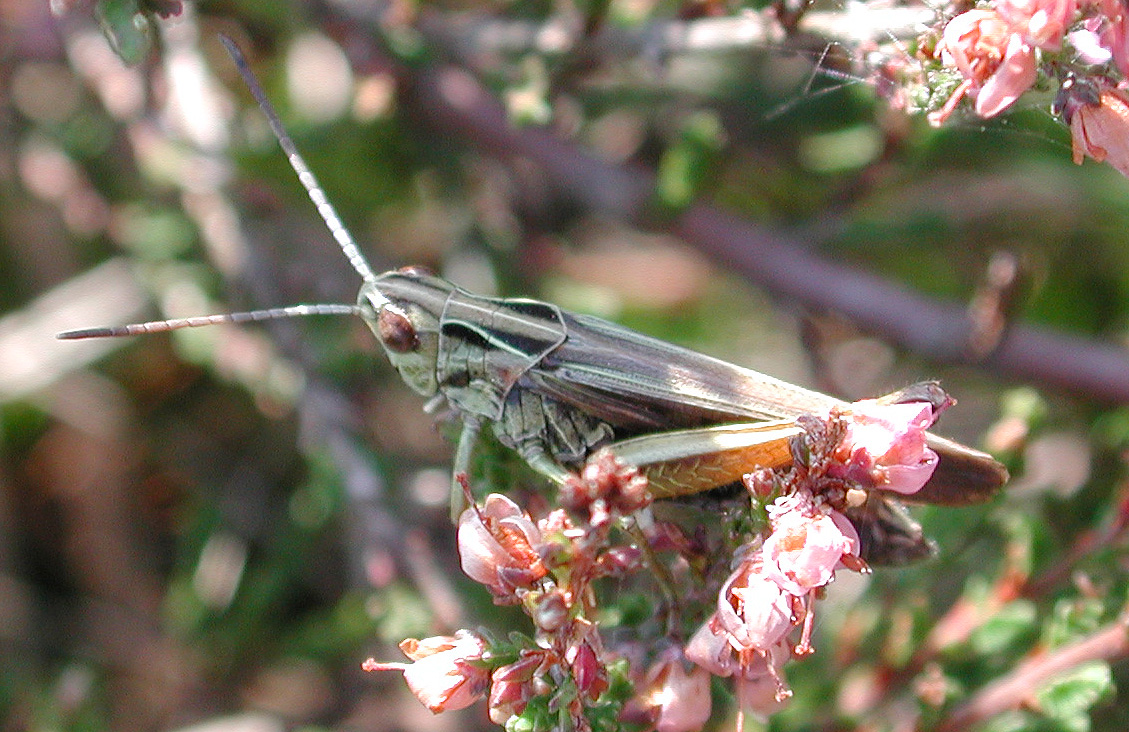

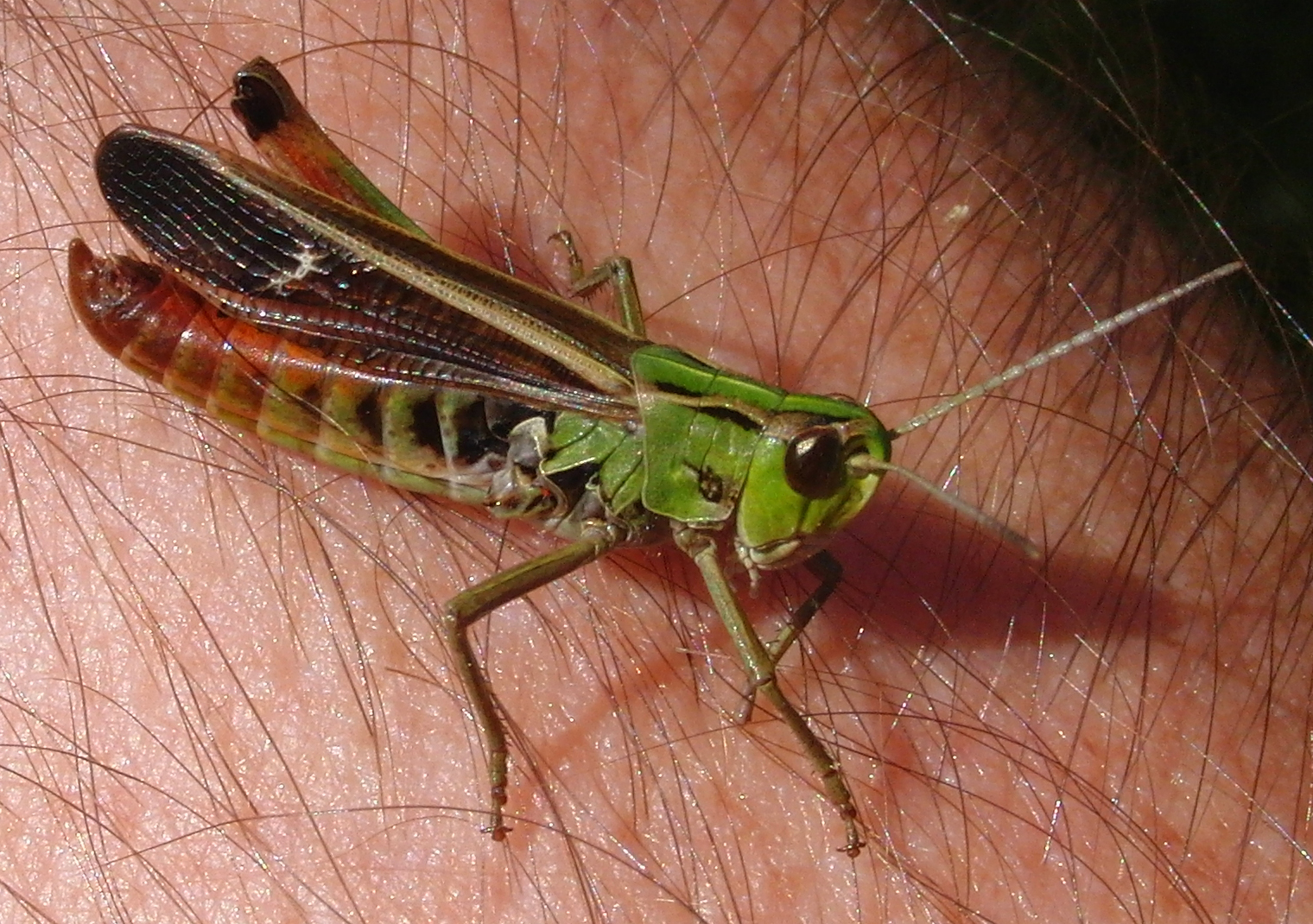
