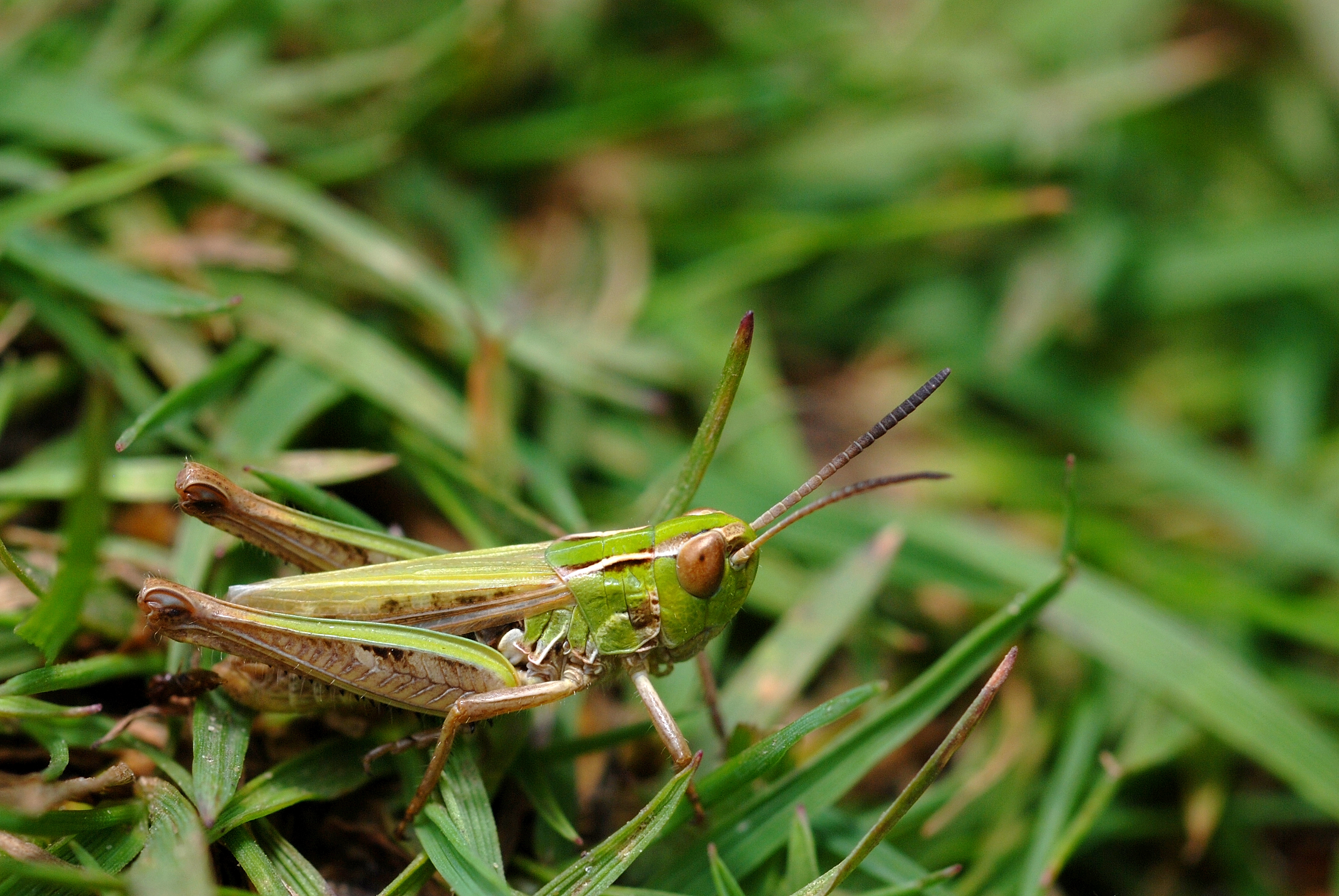
- Male

Conservation status
- Least Concern (IUCN 3.1) (Europe regional assessment)

Scientific classification
- Kingdom: Animalia
- Phylum: Arthropoda
- Class: Insecta
- Order: Orthoptera
- Suborder: Caelifera
- Family: Acrididae
- Genus: Stenobothrus
- Species: S. stigmaticus

Binomial name
- Stenobothrus stigmaticus (Rambur, 1838)

= Stenobothrus stigmaticus =

Species of grasshopper

Stenobothrus stigmaticus is a species belonging to the family Acrididae subfamily Gomphocerinae and is sometimes called the lesser mottled grasshopper.

== Distribution ==
The species inhabits most of Europe, from south Spain to Scandinavia. In the east, it reaches the Baltic Sea coast (southeast Lithuania). In the southeast, it reaches European Russia via the Balkan Peninsula and Northern Greece. In Italy, in the south part of the Alps, Stenobothrus stigmaticus is replaced by her very similar sister species Stenobothrus apenninus. In the British Isles, S. stigmaticus was originally only found on the Isle of Man, but records now exist for north Wales and the Wash (see range map).

Close-Up of a Stenobothrus stigmaticus
