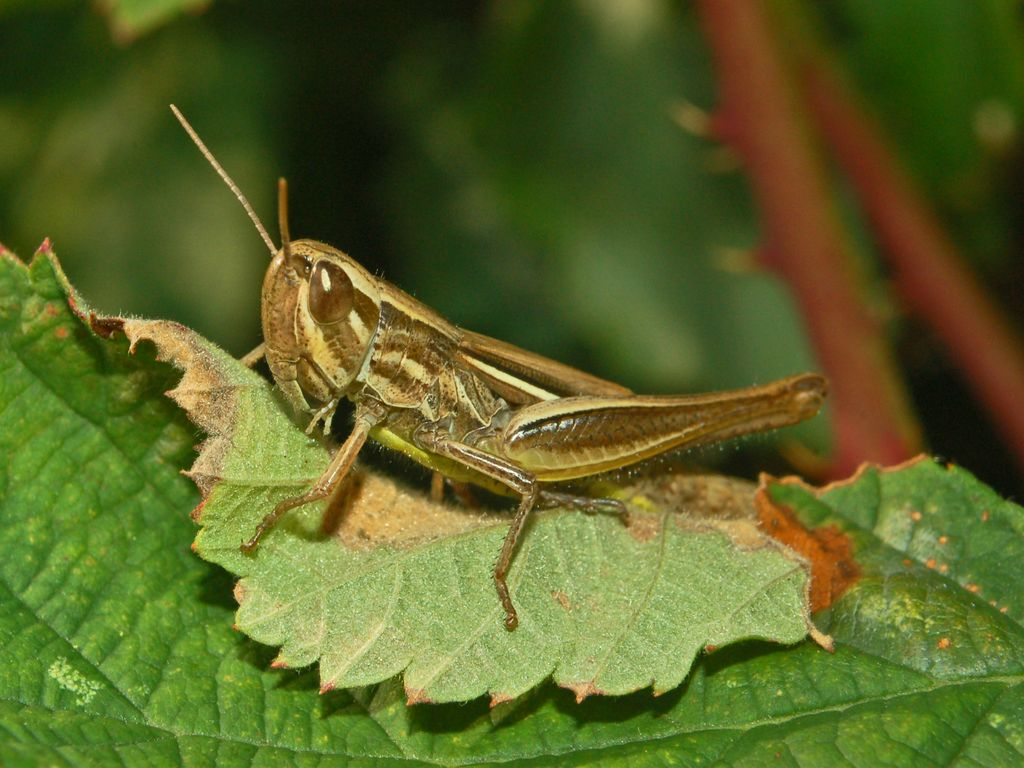

Scientific classification
- Kingdom: Animalia
- Phylum: Arthropoda
- Class: Insecta
- Order: Orthoptera
- Suborder: Caelifera
- Family: Acrididae
- Genus: Euchorthippus
- Species: E. declivus

Binomial name
- Euchorthippus declivus (Brisout, 1848)

Synonyms
- List: Acridium declivus (Brisout de Barneville, 1848); Euchorthippus declivus meridionalis Jannone, 1937; Euchorthippus declivus stichai Maran, 1954; Stenobothrus pulvinatus declivus (Brisout de Barneville, 1848)

= Euchorthippus declivus =

Species of grasshopper

Euchorthippus declivus, the Jersey grasshopper or sharp-tailed grasshopper, is a species of short-horned grasshoppers belonging to the family Acrididae, subfamily Gomphocerinae.

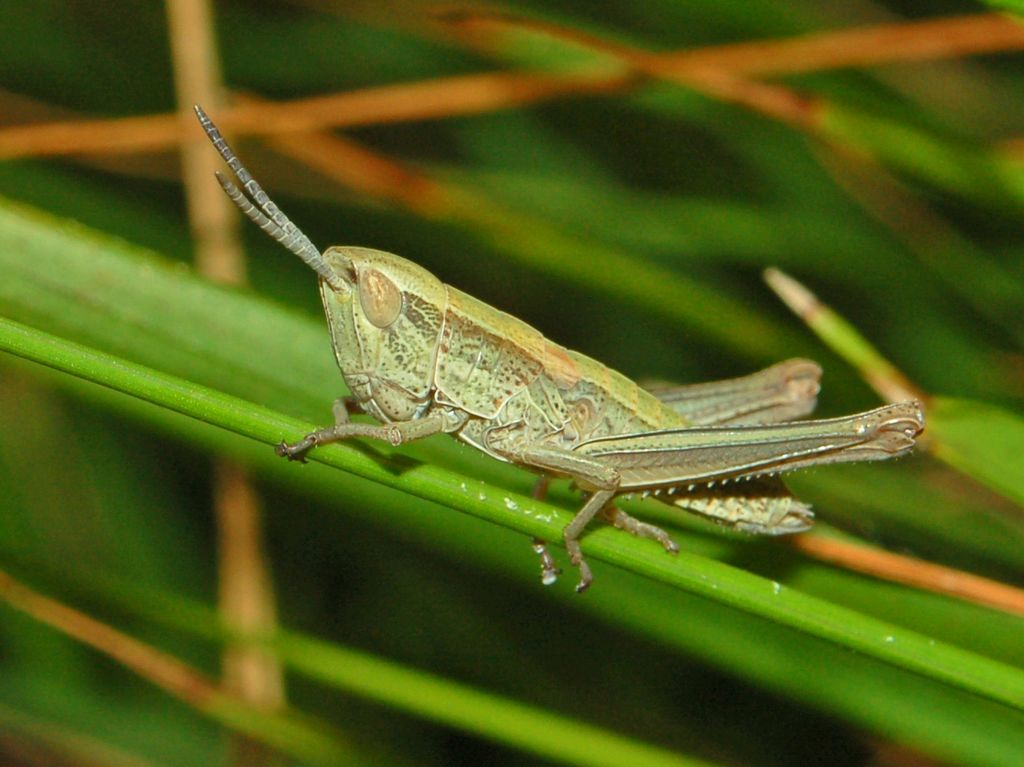
Nymph

== Description ==
The adult males grow up to 14–20 millimetres (0.55–0.79 in) long, while the females reach 20–27 millimetres (0.79–1.06 in) of length. The basic coloration of the body varies from light brown to beige, or occasionally yellow-green. Two or three darker and clearer longitudinal stripes start from the eyes. The head is relatively large. The bottom of the abdomen is yellow, usually with an orange tip in males. Wings are atrophied in both sexes.

Sound of Euchorthippus declivus
Field recording in the Netherlands 20s

Close-Up of a Euchorthippus declivus

== Distribution and habitat ==
This very common species is present in middle and southern Europe. Euchorthippus declivus inhabits arid and sunny environments, southern slopes, gravely plots with sparse vegetation, very dry to moderate wet meadows and pastures.

== Biology ==
They can be encountered from July through October feeding on grasses. The eggs overwinter in the soil.
