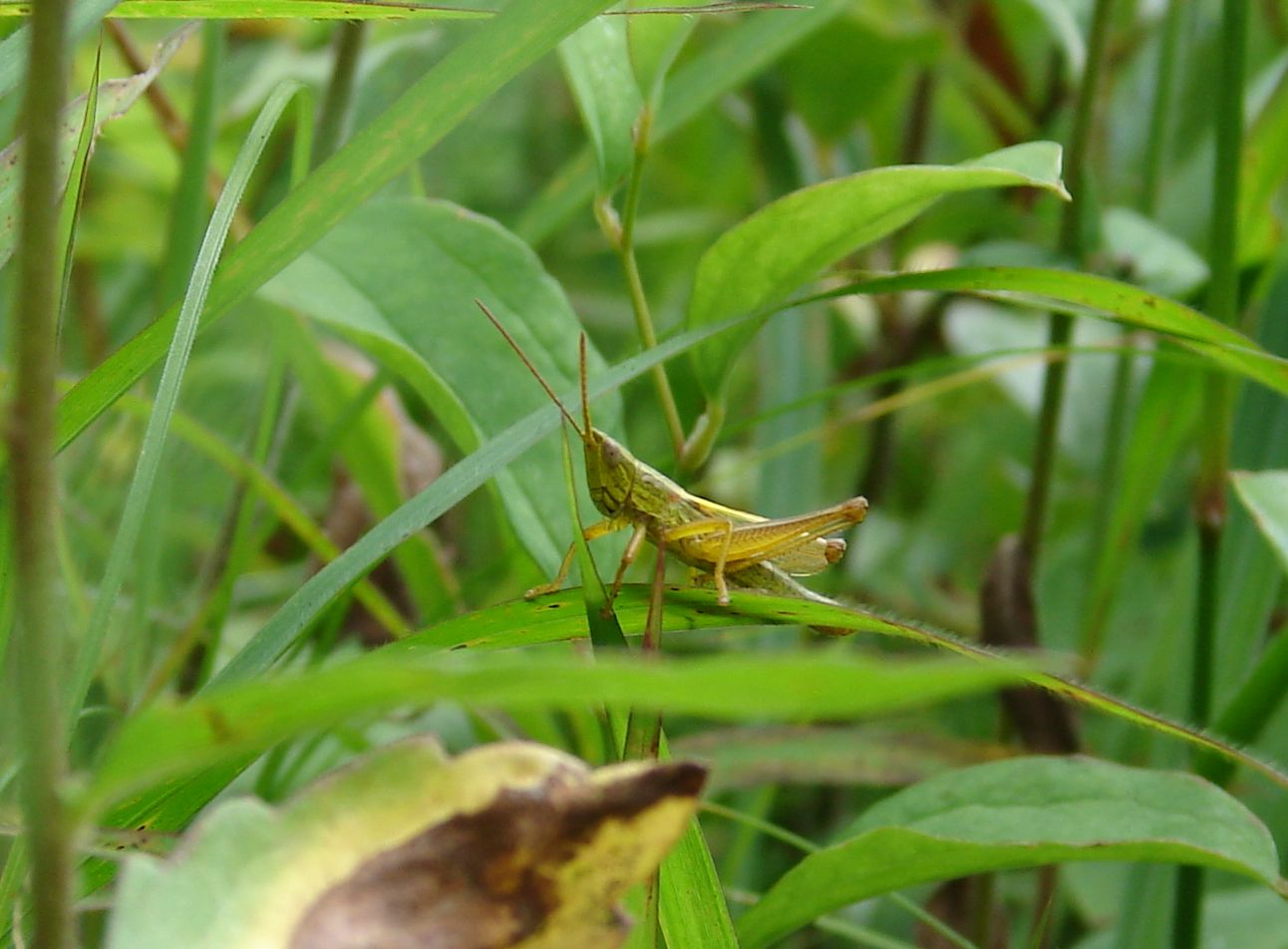
- Mongolotettix japonicus

Scientific classification
- Kingdom: Animalia
- Phylum: Arthropoda
- Clade: Pancrustacea
- Class: Insecta
- Order: Orthoptera
- Suborder: Caelifera
- Family: Acrididae
- Tribe: Chrysochraontini
- Genus: Mongolotettix; Rehn, 1928

= Mongolotettix =

Genus of insects

Mongolotettix is a genus of grasshoppers belonging to the family Acrididae.

The species of this genus are found in Eastern Asia.

Species:

- Mongolotettix angustiseptus Wan, Bingzhong Ren & Fengling Zhang, 1998
- Mongolotettix anomopterus (Caudell, 1921)
