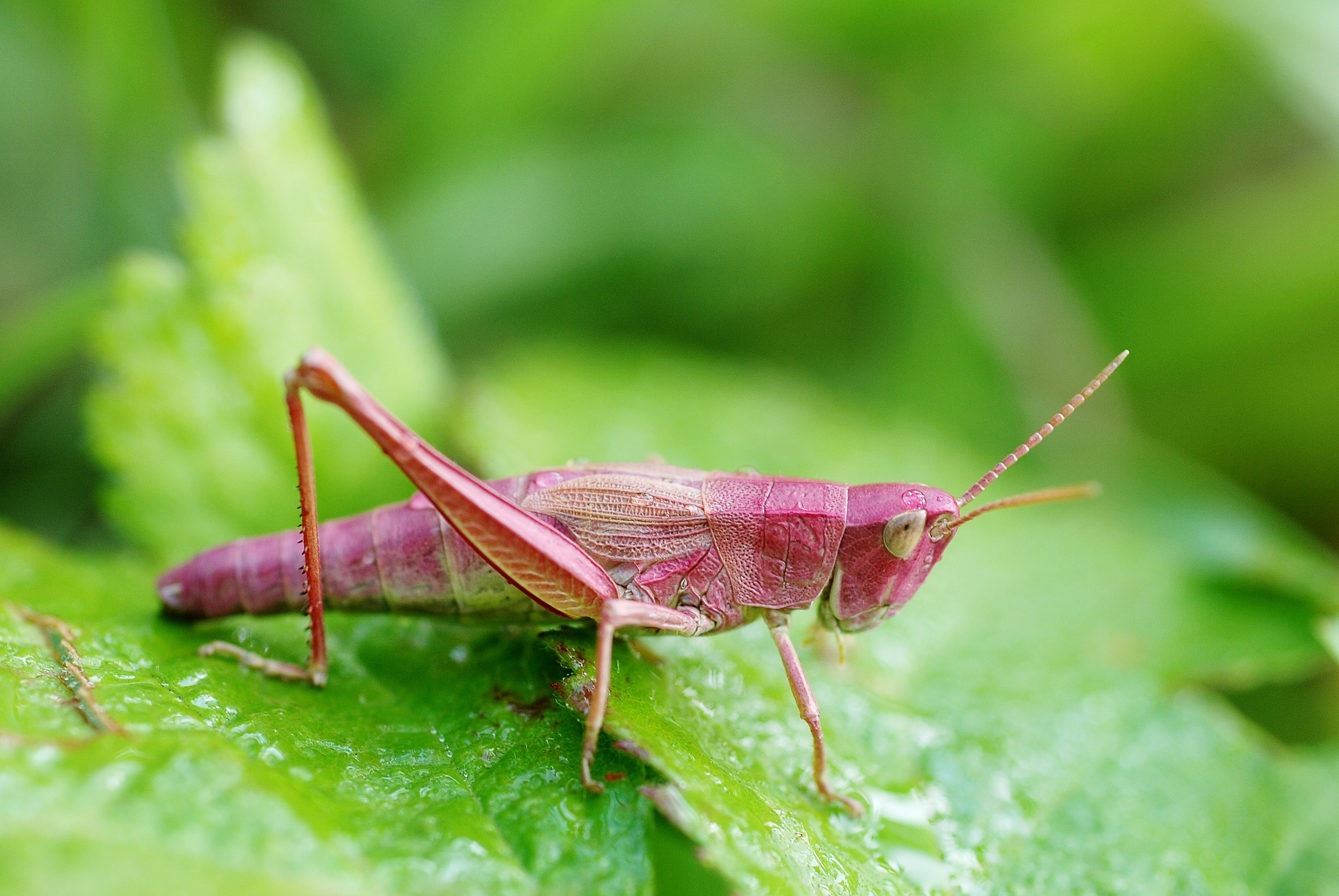
- Chrysochraon dispar

Scientific classification
- Kingdom: Animalia
- Phylum: Arthropoda
- Clade: Pancrustacea
- Class: Insecta
- Order: Orthoptera
- Suborder: Caelifera
- Family: Acrididae
- Tribe: Chrysochraontini
- Genus: Chrysochraon; Fischer, 1853

Type species
- Podisma dispar Germar, 1834

Synonyms
- Chrysocharon Iorgu, Pisica, Pais, Lupu & Iusan, 2008

= Chrysochraon =

Genus of grasshoppers

Chrysochraon is a genus of grasshoppers in the tribe Chrysochraontini within the subfamily Gomphocerinae. They are found mostly in mainland Europe (not the British Isles or Scandinavia) from the Pyrenees to Russia.

== Species ==
Species include:

1. Chrysochraon amurensis Mishchenko, 1986
2. Chrysochraon beybienkoi Galvagni, 1968
3. Chrysochraon dispar (Germar, 1834) - type species (as Podisma dispar Germar)
  - 5 subspecies
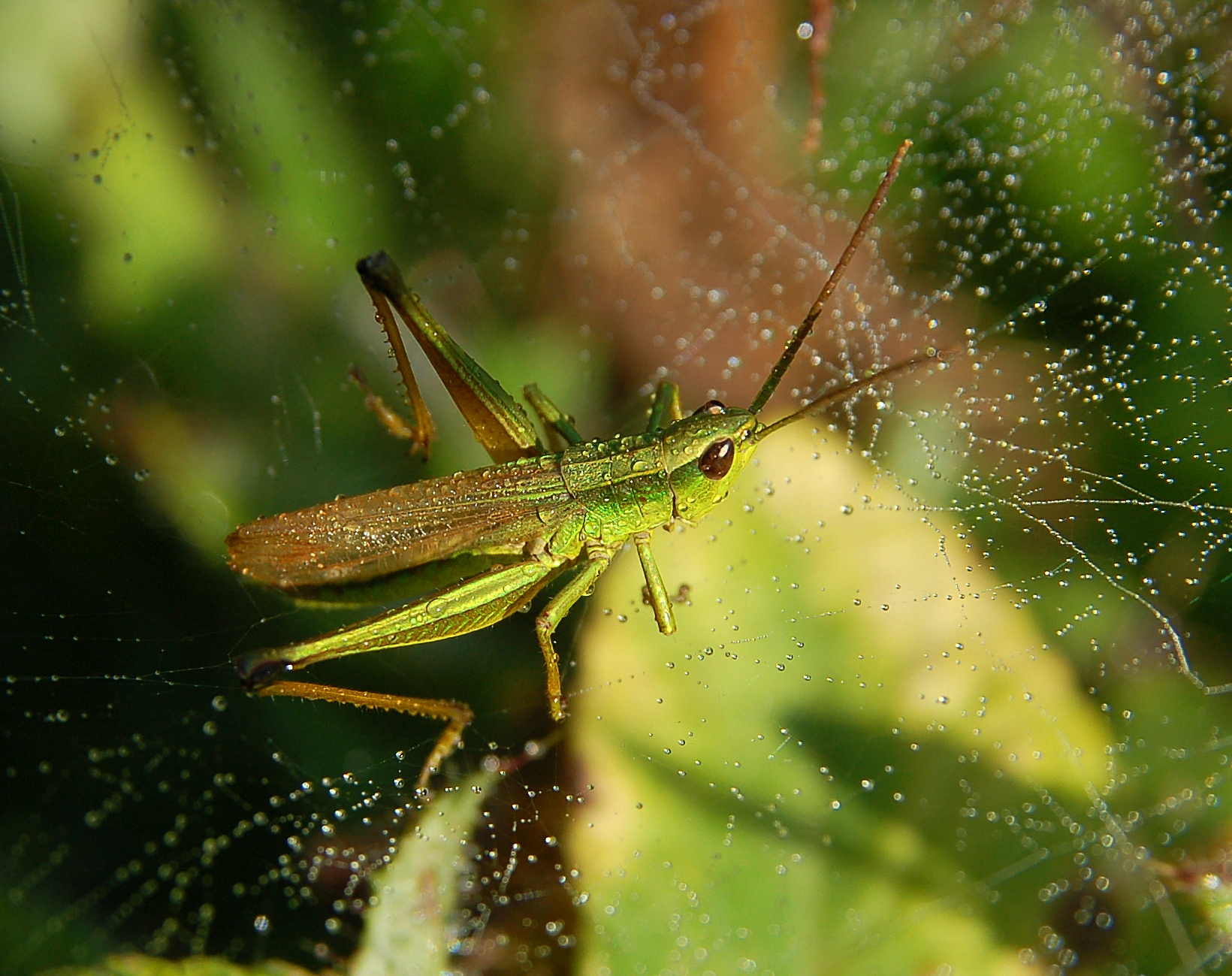
Chrysochraon dispar male

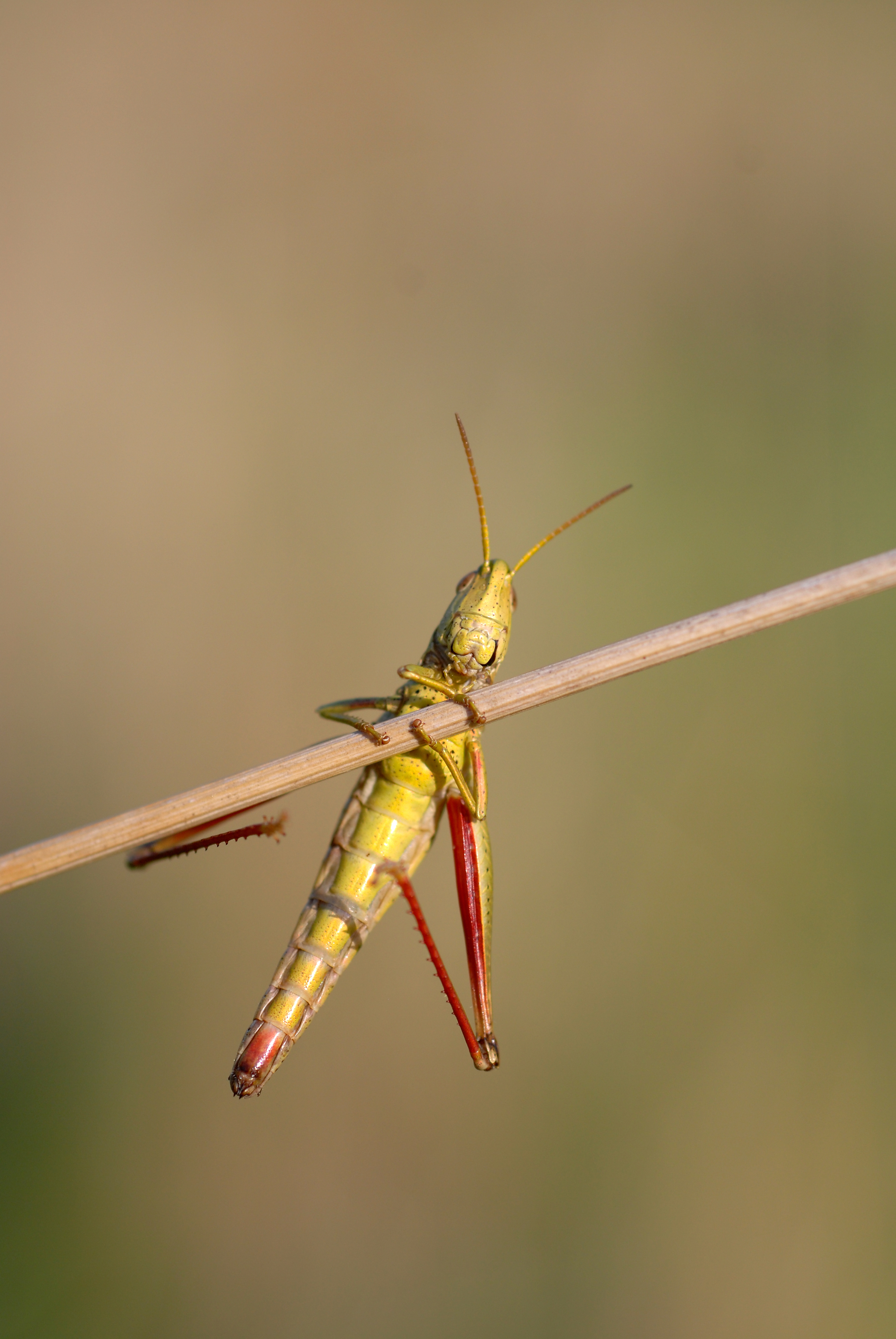
Chrysochraon dispar female
