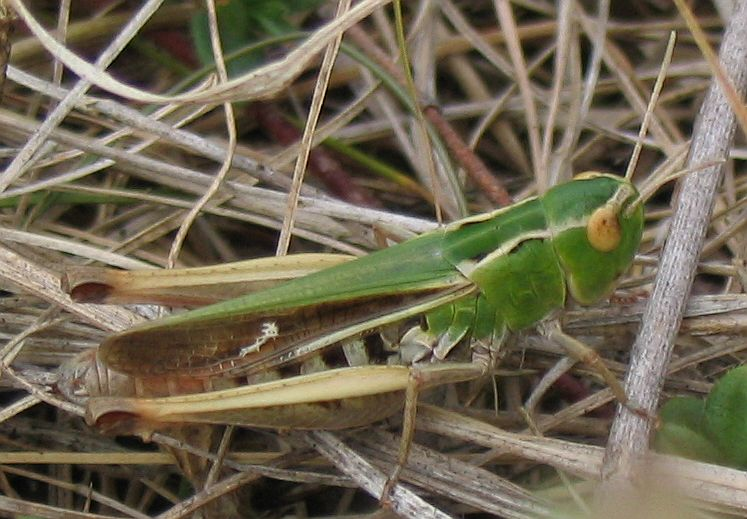
- Stenobothrus lineatus

Scientific classification
- Kingdom: Animalia
- Phylum: Arthropoda
- Clade: Pancrustacea
- Class: Insecta
- Order: Orthoptera
- Suborder: Caelifera
- Family: Acrididae
- Subfamily: Gomphocerinae
- Tribe: Stenobothrini; Harz, 1975

Genera
- See text

= Stenobothrini =

Tribe of grasshoppers

Stenobothrini is a small tribe of Palaearctic grasshoppers in the family Acrididae and subfamily Gomphocerinae erected by Kurt Harz in 1975. Genera occur in Europe, Asia, and northern Africa.

== Genera ==
Genera include:

1. Megaulacobothrus Caudell, 1921
2. Omocestus Bolívar, 1878
3. Stenobothrus Fischer, 1853 - type genus
