= Vasily Plotnikov =

Soviet and Uzbek entomologist (1878–1959)

- Василий Ильич Плотников
- Born: 11 January 1878 [O.S. 30 December 1877] Tomsk, Russian Empire
- Died: November 11, 1959 (aged 81); Lviv, Ukrainian SSR, Soviet Union
- Citizenship: Russian Empire, Soviet Union
- Education: Saint Petersburg Forestry Institute
- Known for: Founding the Turkestan Entomological Station; pioneering research on and control of agricultural pests in Central Asia
- Awards: Hero of Labor of the Uzbek SSR (1930), Gold Medal of the Council of the Saint Petersburg Forestry Institute (1901)
- Scientific career
- Fields: Agricultural entomology, pest control, Orthoptera, insect physiology, hydrobiology, taxonomy of freshwater flatworms
- Workplaces: Turkestan Entomological Station, Central Asian State University, Lviv Agricultural Institute
- Author abbrev. (zoology): Plotnikow

Vasily Ilyich Plotnikov (Russian: Василий Ильич Плотников; 11 January 1878 [O.S. 30 December 1877] – 11 November 1959) was a Soviet and Uzbek entomologist. Plotnikov was the founder and long-serving director of the Turkestan Entomological Station in Tashkent (1911–1932), the first pest control research and experimental institution in Central Asia. He is regarded as a founding figure in agricultural entomology in Central Asia. Plotnikov authored the first comprehensive reference book on Central Asian crop pests and their control (1926). Plotnikov was also the founder and first chairman of the Turkestan Entomological Society (1923).

Early in his career, Plotnikov made significant contributions to hydrobiology, describing 14 species of freshwater worms. He also conducted influential research on the mechanism of insect molting; the findings were widely integrated into contemporary entomological reference textbooks. His academic credentials and honors included a Doctor of Biological Sciences degree (1935), a Professor (1935), and the title of Hero of Labor of the Uzbek SSR (1930).

== Biography and career ==
=== Early research in Saint Petersburg: flatworms and insect physiology ===
Plotnikov was born on 11 January 1878 [O.S. 30 December 1877] into a middle-class (meshchanin) family in Tomsk, Siberia. After graduating from the Tomsk Real School in 1896, he enrolled at the Saint Petersburg Forestry Institute. There, he studied under the prominent zoologist and entomologist Professor Nikolay Kholodkovsky.

At Kholodkovsky's recommendation, Plotnikov spent the summers of 1899 and 1900 working at the Bologoye Biological Station, where he studied freshwater worms and published his first scientific paper in 1899.

Plotnikov graduated from the Forestry Institute in 1901. For his graduation research on insect physiology On the Molting of Insects ("О линянии насекомых") he was awarded the Gold Medal of the Council of the Saint Petersburg Forestry Institute.

On 28 December 1903, Plotnikov was elected a Fellow of the Saint Petersburg Society of Naturalists.

In 1901–1908, Plotnikov served as a conservator—managing the museum and laboratory collections—at Kholodkovsky's Department of Zoology and Comparative Anatomy at the Military Medical Academy in Saint Petersburg. During this period, Plotnikov focused on the taxonomic study of worms, describing 14 new species—predominantly freshwater flatworms (Turbellaria).

In 1908–1911, Plotnikov worked as an assistant in the laboratory of the Forestry Department of the Ministry of Agriculture and State Property under the noted entomologist Ivan Shevyryov, focusing on forest pest control.

=== Turkestan Entomological Station in Tashkent ===
In 1911, on the recommendation of Shevyryov, Plotnikov was appointed to organize and head the newly established Turkestan Entomological Station under the Department of Agriculture and State Property of the Turkestan Governor-Generalship in Tashkent, a post he held until 1932. It was the first entomological station in Central Asia.

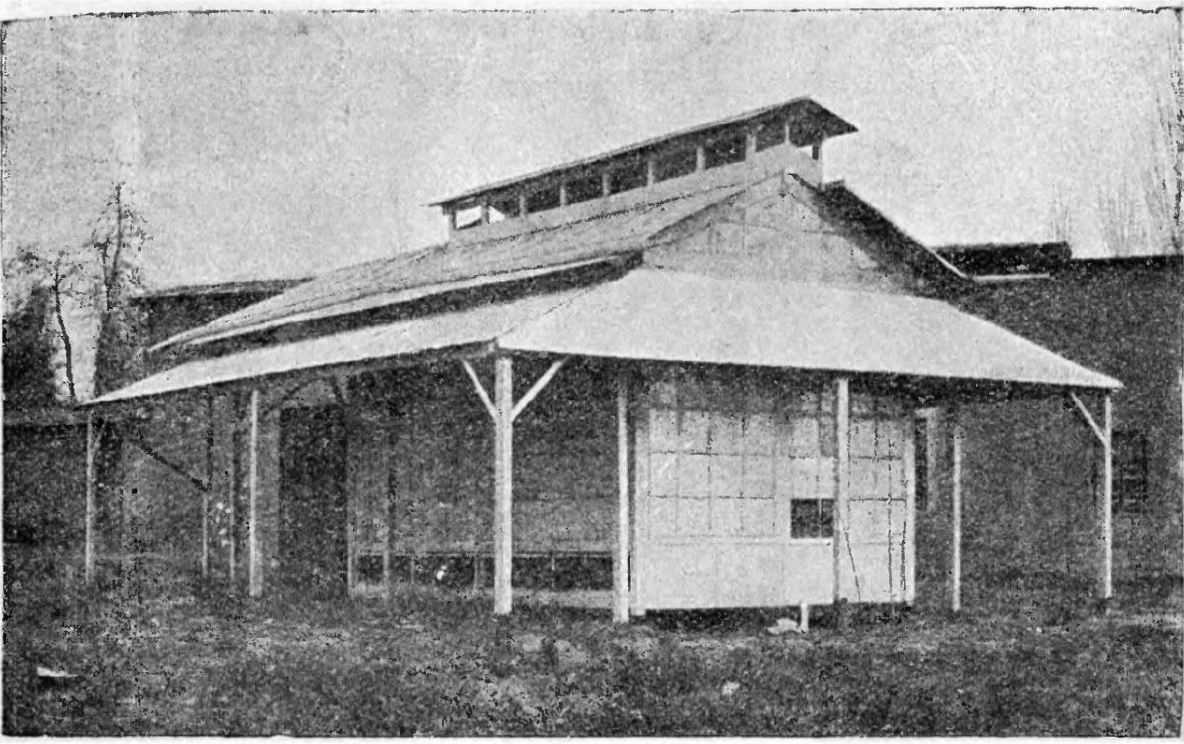
The Insectarium of the Turkestan Entomological Station in Tashkent: it had glass walls (facing south, east, and west), the ant-proof support posts, and the dual ventilation (Plotnikov, 1926).

The station's principal research focused on the major agricultural pests of the region, particularly locusts (the migratory locust, Locusta migratoria and the Moroccan locust, Dociostaurus maroccanus), the mountain bug (Dolycoris penicillatus), and cotton pests. The station operated primarily as a scientific and advisory institution. Its core functions included research on the region's insect pests and entomofauna, detailed studies of locust biology, the development of effective pest control methods, the publication of books, recommendations, and educational materials, and public outreach through lectures, brochures, a museum of applied entomology, instructor training, and public consultations on pest management. Locusts and orchard pests dominated the station's early agenda, and its most significant achievement in applied entomology during this period was the pioneering development and practical implementation of poisoned baits for locust control.

Over time, the station expanded its fieldwork beyond Tashkent into Bukhara, Samarkand, and the Fergana Valley, conducting research on the Moroccan and Italian locusts, spider mites, Caradrina moths, and cotton bollworms. In 1912, Plotnikov participated in a meeting with representatives of the cotton industry that led to the establishment of the Bukhara Entomological Station (Shirabudin). In 1916, he secured authorization from Governor-General Fyodor Martson to establish microbiological and bacteriological laboratories at the station, expanding its research capacity beyond field investigations to include laboratory studies of pest biology.

Among the prominent scientists who worked at the station were Nikolay Zaprometov, Aleksei Zachvatkin (Yazykov), Valerian Nevsky, Petr Archangelsky, Vladimir Serbinov, Vladimir Yakhontov, Rakhim Alimdjanov, N.N. Nikolsky, E. N. Ivanov, A. E. Rodd, Z. S. Vedeneeva, N. N. Troitsky, I.A. Sevastyanov, A. F. Radetsky, N. B. Teikh, M. A. Karimov, and K. I. Mirpulatov.

Under Plotnikov's leadership, the station became the major centre of systematic entomological research in Central Asia, playing a vital role in the development of plant protection across the region and serving as the foundation for several subsequent plant protection institutions. The station introduced modern chemical methods of plant protection to Central Asia, where the use of chemical control measures had previously been little known, and played an important role in their development and wider adoption. The station also pioneered biological pest control in Central Asia. The first documented attempts to use Trichogramma parasitoid wasps against agricultural pests in the region were carried out there by A. F. Radetsky. According to the journal Plant Protection, the Turkestan Entomological station "played an enormous role in training, particularly among the indigenous national cadres, specialists in entomology, phytopathology, and zoology for numerous research institutions, educational establishments, and agricultural organizations in Uzbekistan, Tajikistan, Turkmenistan, Kyrgyzstan, Kazakhstan, and other republics of the Soviet Union." In 1927, Soviet agricultural entomologist Nikolai Bogdanov-Katkov, a leading specialist in plant protection and founder of the Plant Protection journal, wrote: "It may be said without exaggeration that the remarkable development of entomological research in Turkestan was due primarily to Plotnikov."

On February 3, 1923, Plotnikov initiated the establishment of the Turkestan Entomological Society in Tashkent and served as its first chairman. The goal of the Society, as stated in an appeal for support addressed to the Russian Entomological Society, was to unite the entomologists of Turkestan and coordinate theoretical and applied entomological research across Central Asia.

In 1925, the Turkestan Entomological Station was substantially expanded and reorganized as the Uzbek Plant Protection Station (UzSTAZRA). It subsequently gave rise to a succession of specialized plant protection institutions, including the Central Asian Institute of Plant Protection (SAIZR), ultimately evolving into the USSR's Central Asian Scientific Research Institute of Plant Protection and its successor, the present-day Research Institute of Plant Quarantine and Plant Protection of Uzbekistan.

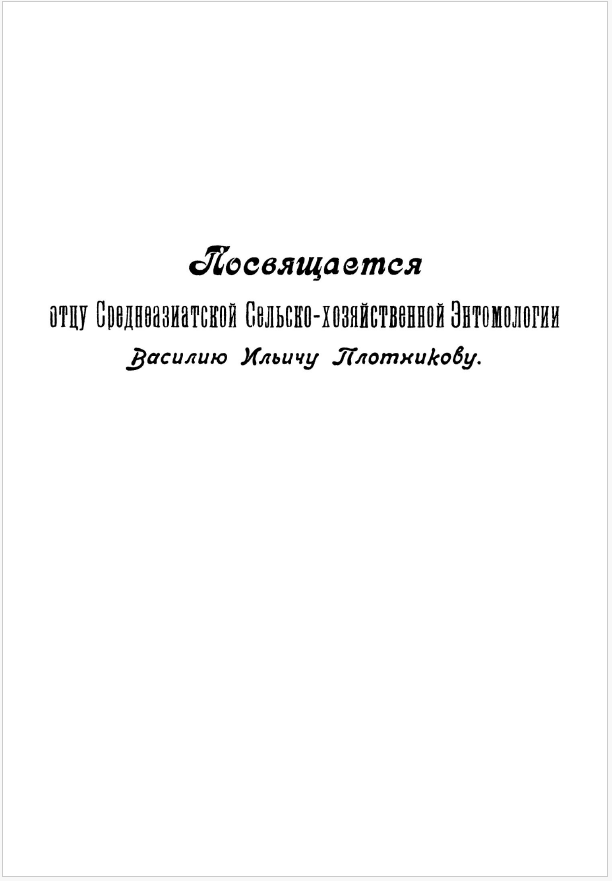
Dedication page from Vladimir Yakhontov's 1928 monograph, reading in Russian: "Dedicated to the father of Central Asian Agricultural Entomology, Vasily Ilyich Plotnikov"

In recognition of his contributions, the Government of the Uzbek SSR awarded Plotnikov the honorary title of Hero of Labour of the Uzbek SSR in 1930. The prominent Uzbek entomologist Vladimir Yakhontov described Plotnikov as the founding father of Central Asian agricultural entomology in his 1928 monograph.

Alongside his research, Plotnikov taught entomology at the Agricultural Faculty of the Central Asian State University (SAGU) from 1918 to 1931. In 1931, he was elected the university's representative to the Tashkent City Council.

Beyond his research output, Plotnikov was known for supporting both visiting and local scientists. According to the memoirs of biologist Boris Kuzin, Plotnikov helped organize collecting expeditions for the prominent Moscow entomologists Boris Rohdendorf and E. S. Smirnov to Samarkand and the Transcaspian region (present-day Turkmenistan) in 1922, where they collected butterflies and other insects. In 1925, Rohdendorf described a new species of flesh fly, naming it Sarcophaga plotnikovi in Plotnikov's honor. In their 1927 study of the ecology of the Turkestan yellow ground squirrel, Daniil Kashkarov and L. Lein-Sokolova also expressed their gratitude to Plotnikov for "his sympathetic attitude toward their work, the interest he took in it, and his material support in carrying it out."

=== Later academic career: Pyatigorsk, Ufa, Tashkent, Lviv ===
In 1932, Plotnikov relocated to the North Caucasus, where he taught zoology at the North Caucasus Institute of Horse Breeding in Pyatigorsk. From 1933 to 1936, he served as a professor of entomology at the Bashkir Agricultural Institute in Ufa.

In 1935, Plotnikov was awarded the academic degree of Doctor of Biological Sciences and the title of Professor without defending a dissertation, in recognition of his extensive scientific contributions.

He returned to Tashkent in 1936, joining the faculty of the Central Asian State University again to teach histology and embryology until his retirement in 1941. During World War II, he remained in Tashkent on an academic pension.

In June 1945, Plotnikov relocated to Lviv, Ukrainian SSR, where he was appointed Head of the Department of Plant Protection at the Lviv Agricultural Institute. He held this position until his retirement in 1957.

Plotnikov died in Lviv on 11 November 1959.

== Scientific contributions ==
=== Agricultural Entomology ===
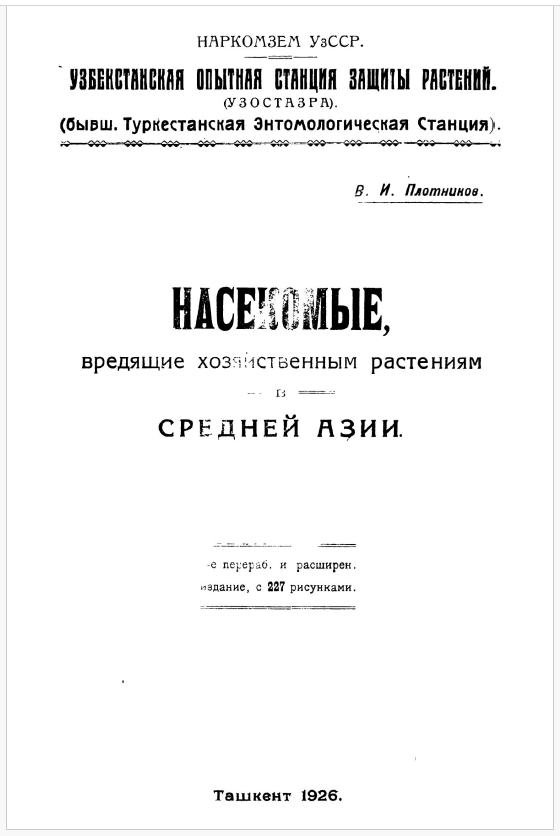
Front cover of Vasily Plotnikov's monograph "Insects Injurious to Economic Plants in Central Asia", the first comprehensive reference book on Central Asian crop pests and their control (1926).

In a 1960 obituary published in the journal Plant Protection, Plotnikov was described as "one of the foremost entomologists whose name is closely associated with the development of plant protection in Central Asia." In 1926, Plotnikov published his most extensive work in agricultural entomology, Insects Injurious to Economic Plants in Central Asia, a 292-page compendium that compiled decades of research at Turkestan Entomological Station. It was the first comprehensive reference book on Central Asian crop pests and their control. Designed to be accessible to non-specialists, the book categorized pests by the damage they inflicted on host plants and served as the primary field manual for Central Asian agronomy for over twenty-five years, until Vladimir Yakhontov's 1953 monograph, Pests of Agricultural Plants and Products of Central Asia and Their Control, replaced it as the standard text. Plotnikov also integrated environmental factors into pest forecasting and modernized regional agricultural infrastructure by publishing the first bilingual Russian-Uzbek terminology guide for crop protection.

Plotnikov's research laid the foundation for Boris Uvarov's landmark phase theory of locusts. Plotnikov's early breeding experiments in 1913–1914 produced the data used by Boris Uvarov to formulate his theory in 1921. In subsequent controlled breeding experiments conducted in 1923 and published in 1924 and 1927, Plotnikov empirically proved the mechanism behind the theory, demonstrating that environmental crowding directly causes locusts to develop gregarious coloration and behavior, while solitary breeding leads to solitary coloration matching the environment. These experimental findings on density-dependent variation were discovered concurrently with, and independently of, the work of South African entomologist Jacobus Christiaan Faure.

In research published in 1931, Plotnikov demonstrated that the area occupied by bands of Moroccan locust (Dociostaurus maroccanus) increased by 200–300 times between hatching and adult emergence. Based on these observations, he argued that effective control required destroying the locusts during the first two nymphal instars, before the bands dispersed. His findings explained the failure of earlier control campaigns that targeted later developmental stages. Academician Yevgeny Pavlovsky later highlighted this study as one of Plotnikov's key contributions.

=== Hydrobiology ===
During his early career, Plotnikov conducted research in hydrobiology, and published works under the German transliteration W. Plotnikow. He described 14 species of worms, mostly freshwater flatworms (Turbellaria) and annelids. As of 2026, seven of these species remain accepted as taxonomically valid:

- Dalyellia caucasica Plotnikow, 1906
- Macrostomum infundibuliferum Plotnikow, 1905
- Papiella otophthalma (Plotnikow, 1906) Mack-Fira, 1970
- Microdalyellia erivanica (Plotnikow, 1906)
- Gieysztoria sibirica (Plotnikow, 1905) Ruebush & Hayes, 1939
- Gieysztoria virgulifera (Plotnikow, 1906) Ruebush & Hayes, 1939
- Cylicobdella costaricae (Plotnikow, 1905) – a terrestrial leech native to Costa Rica in Central America, described by Plotnikov from specimens kept at the Imperial Academy of Sciences in Saint Petersburg.

=== Insect Physiology ===
While at the Forestry Institute, Plotnikov also conducted pioneering research on insect cuticle shedding. His graduation manuscript, "On the Molting of Insects" ("О линянии насекомых"), won the Gold Medal of the Institute's Academic Council in 1901 and was published in German in 1904 as "Über die Häutung und über einige Elemente der Haut bei den Insekten". The study established how the chitinous cuticle separates and slides from the hypodermis via a specialized "plasmatic layer" during a molt. It also demonstrated the three-cell structure of larval glands across various insect larvae (including mealworms, leaf beetles, and ladybugs). These findings were widely incorporated into later entomological textbooks.

== Awards and legacy ==
- Gold Medal of the Council of the Saint Petersburg Forestry Institute (1901)
- Hero of Labor of the Uzbek SSR (30 March 1930) — awarded for his outstanding contributions to regional agriculture and locust control.

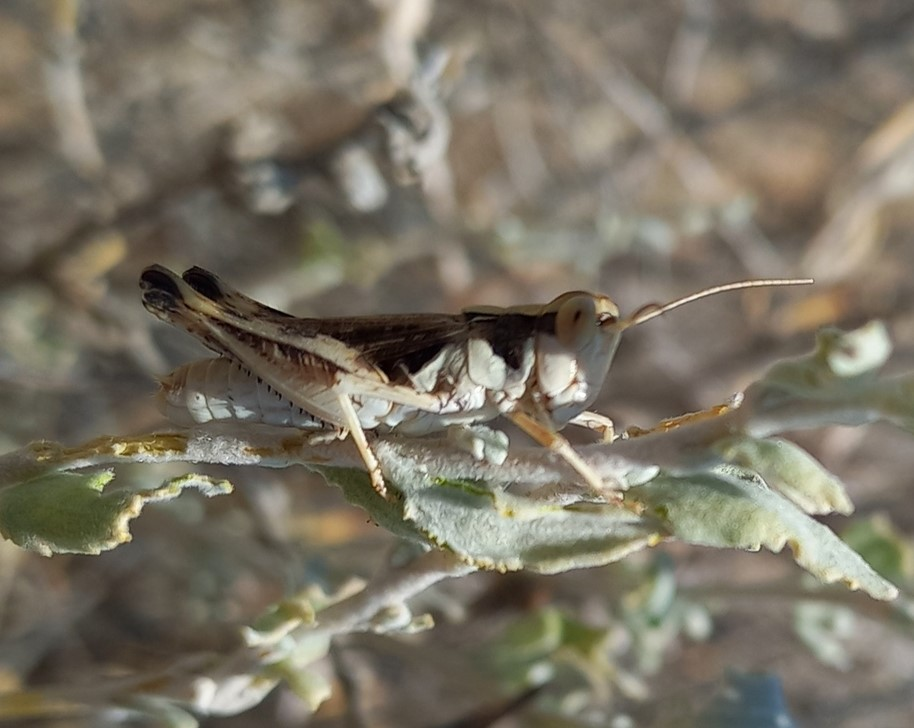
Dociostaurus plotnikovi, a grasshopper species named in Plotnikov's honour

- Several insect taxa have been named in honor of Plotnikov, including:
  - The grasshopper genus Plotnikovia Umnov, 1930
  - The grasshopper species Plotnikovia lanigera Umnov, 1930
  - The grasshopper species Dociostaurus plotnikovi Uvarov, 1921
  - The grasshopper species Conophyma plotnikovi Uvarov, 1927
  - The grasshopper subspecies Gomphomastax clavata plotnikovi Bolívar, 1927
  - The aphid species Brachyunguis plotnikovi (Nevsky, 1928)
  - The pistachio seed wasp Eurytoma plotnikovi Nikol'skaya, 1934
  - The flesh fly species Sarcophaga (Heteronychia) plotnikovi Rohdendorf, 1925

== Selected publications ==
Plotnikov authored over 60 scientific publications on agricultural entomology and insect physiology and about 10 publications on hydrobiology.

=== Agricultural Entomology ===
- Insects Injurious to Economic Plants in Central Asia [Nasekomye, vredyashchie khozyaystvennym rasteniyam v Sredney Azii]. Tashkent, 1926. 292 pp.
- Locusta (Pachytylus) migratoria L. and L. danica L. as Independent Forms and Their Derivatives [Locusta migratoria L. i L. danica L. kak samostoyatelnye formy i ikh proizvodnye]. Tashkent, 1927. 33 pp.
- The Main Pests and Diseases of Agricultural Plants in Central Asia and Their Control [Glavnye vrediteli i bolezni selskokhozyaystvennykh rasteniy v Sredney Azii i borba s nimi]. Tashkent, 1932. 134 pp.
- Insects Injurious to Horticulture, Agriculture, and Market Gardening in Turkestan [Nasekomye, vredyashchie sadovodstvu, polevodstvu i ogorodnichestvu v Turkestane]. Tashkent, 1914. 216 pp.
- Insects Injurious to Cotton in Turkestan [Nasekomye, vredyashchie khlopchatniku v Turkestane]. Khlopkovoye delo, 1926. No. 1-2, pp. 1–16.
- Terminology for the Control of Pests and Diseases of Agricultural Plants in Russian and Uzbek [Terminologiya po bor'be s vreditelyami i boleznyami sel'skokhozyaystvennykh rasteniy (na russkom i uzbekskom yazykakh)]. People's Commissariat for Agriculture of the Uzbek SSR Publishing House. Tashkent, 1931. 54 pp.
- Some observations on the variability of Locusta migratoria L., in breeding experiments. Bulletin of Entomological Research, London, 1924. Vol. 14, No. 3, pp. 241–243.

=== Hydrobiology ===
- Nematoda, Oligochaeta, and Hirudinea Found in Lake Bologoye and its Vicinity in 1899 [Nematoda, Oligochaeta i Hirudinea, naydennye v Bologovskom ozere i ego okrestnostyakh v 1899 g.]. Trudy Presnovskoy Biologicheskoy Stantsii [Proceedings of the Freshwater Biological Station of the St. Petersburg Society of Naturalists], 1901. Vol. 1, pp. 244–251.
- On Some Rhabdocoel Turbellarians of Siberia [Über einige rhabdocöle Turbellarien Sibiriens]. Zoologische Jahrbücher, 1905. Vol. 21, No. 4, pp. 479–490.
- Glossiphoniidae, Hirudinidae, and Erpobdellidae of the Zoological Museum of the Academy of Sciences [Glossiphoniidae, Herudinidae i Herpobdellidae Zoologicheskogo muzeya Akademii Nauk]. Ezhegodnik Zoologicheskogo Muzeya Akademii Nauk [Annuary of the Zoological Museum of the Academy of Sciences], 1905. Vol. 10, pp. 133–158.
- The Rhabdocoel Turbellarians of the Vicinity of Lake Goktscha [Die rhabdocölen Turbellarien der Umgebung des Goktscha-See]. Zoologische Jahrbücher, 1906. Vol. 23, No. 3, pp. 395–400.
- Leeches from the Vicinity of Saratov [Piyavki iz okrestnostey g. Saratova]. Proceedings of the Volga Biological Station [Raboty Volzhskoy biologicheskoy stantsii], 1909. Vol. 3, Issue 3, No. 5. pp. 11-17.

=== Insect Physiology ===
- On Molting and on Some Elements of the Cuticle in Insects [Über die Häutung und über einige Elemente der Haut bei den Insekten]. Zeitschrift für wissenschaftliche Zoologie, 1904. Vol. 76, No. 3, pp. 334–336.
