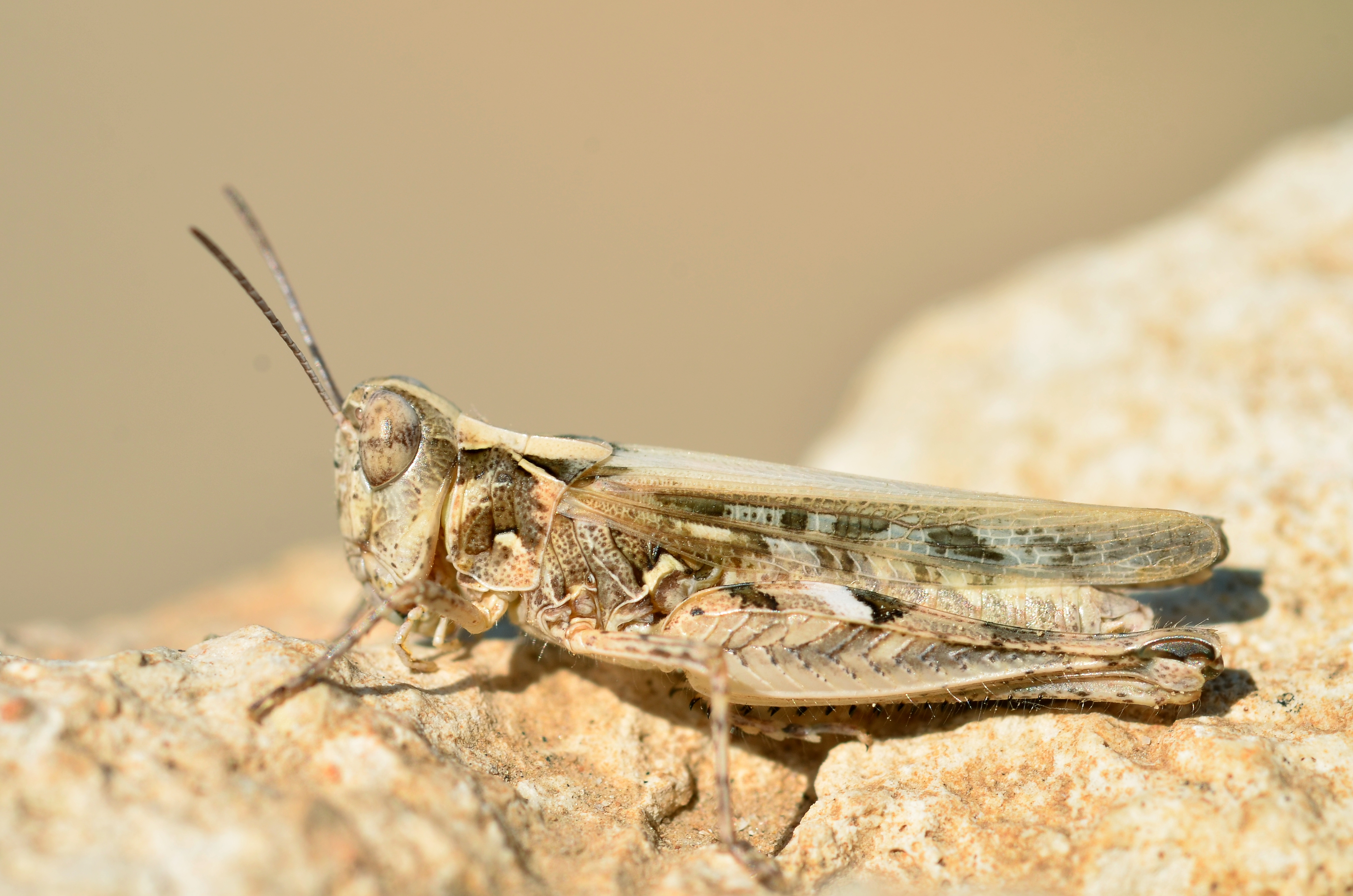
- Dociostaurus jagoi, Belgium

Scientific classification
- Domain: Eukaryota
- Kingdom: Animalia
- Phylum: Arthropoda
- Class: Insecta
- Order: Orthoptera
- Suborder: Caelifera
- Family: Acrididae
- Subfamily: Gomphocerinae
- Tribe: Dociostaurini
- Genus: Dociostaurus
- Species: D. jagoi

Binomial name
- Dociostaurus jagoi Soltani, 1978

= Dociostaurus jagoi =

Species of grasshopper

Dociostaurus jagoi is a species of grasshoppers: typical of the tribe Dociostaurini and placed in the subgenus Kazakia. It was named after the English orthopterist Nicholas Jago and is found in the western Palearctic region.

== Subspecies ==
These subspecies belong to the species Dociostaurus jagoi:

- D. jagoi jagoi Soltani, 1978 (Jago's Grasshopper)
- D. jagoi occidentalis Soltani, 1978
