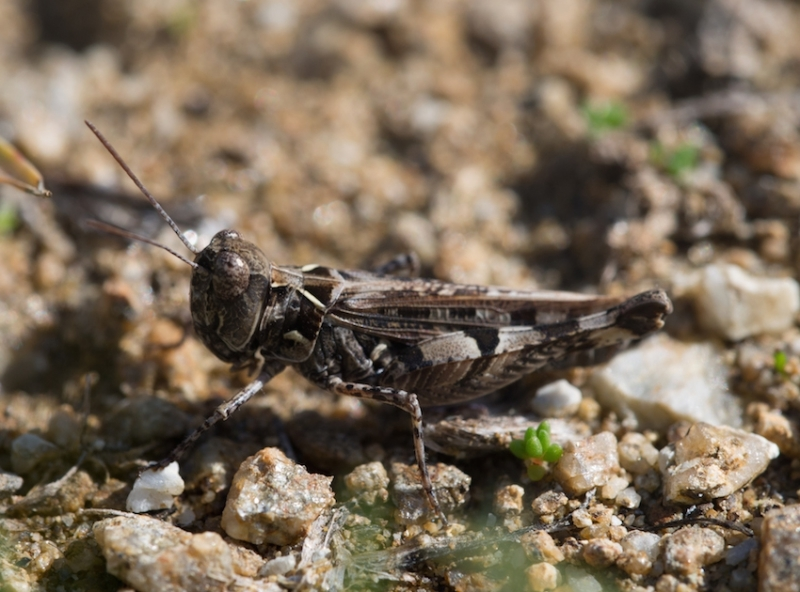
- Dociostaurus genei genei, France

Scientific classification
- Kingdom: Animalia
- Phylum: Arthropoda
- Clade: Pancrustacea
- Class: Insecta
- Order: Orthoptera
- Suborder: Caelifera
- Family: Acrididae
- Subfamily: Gomphocerinae
- Tribe: Dociostaurini
- Genus: Dociostaurus
- Species: D. genei

Binomial name
- Dociostaurus genei (Ocskay, 1832)

= Dociostaurus genei =

Species of grasshopper

Dociostaurus genei is a species of slant-faced grasshopper in the family Acrididae. It is found in southern Europe and the Middle East.

== Subspecies ==
These subspecies belong to the species Dociostaurus genei:

- Dociostaurus genei genei (Ocskay, 1832)
- Dociostaurus genei littoralis Soltani, 1978
