= Department of Agriculture and State Property of the Turkestan Governor-Generalship =

Agriculture department of Turkestan

- Управление земледелия и государственных имуществ Туркестанского края

Government department overview
- Formed: c. 1898
- Dissolved: 1917
- Jurisdiction: Turkestan Governor-Generalship
- Headquarters: Tashkent
- Parent department: Ministry of Agriculture and State Property (to 1905); Chief Administration for Land Organisation and Agriculture (1905–1917)

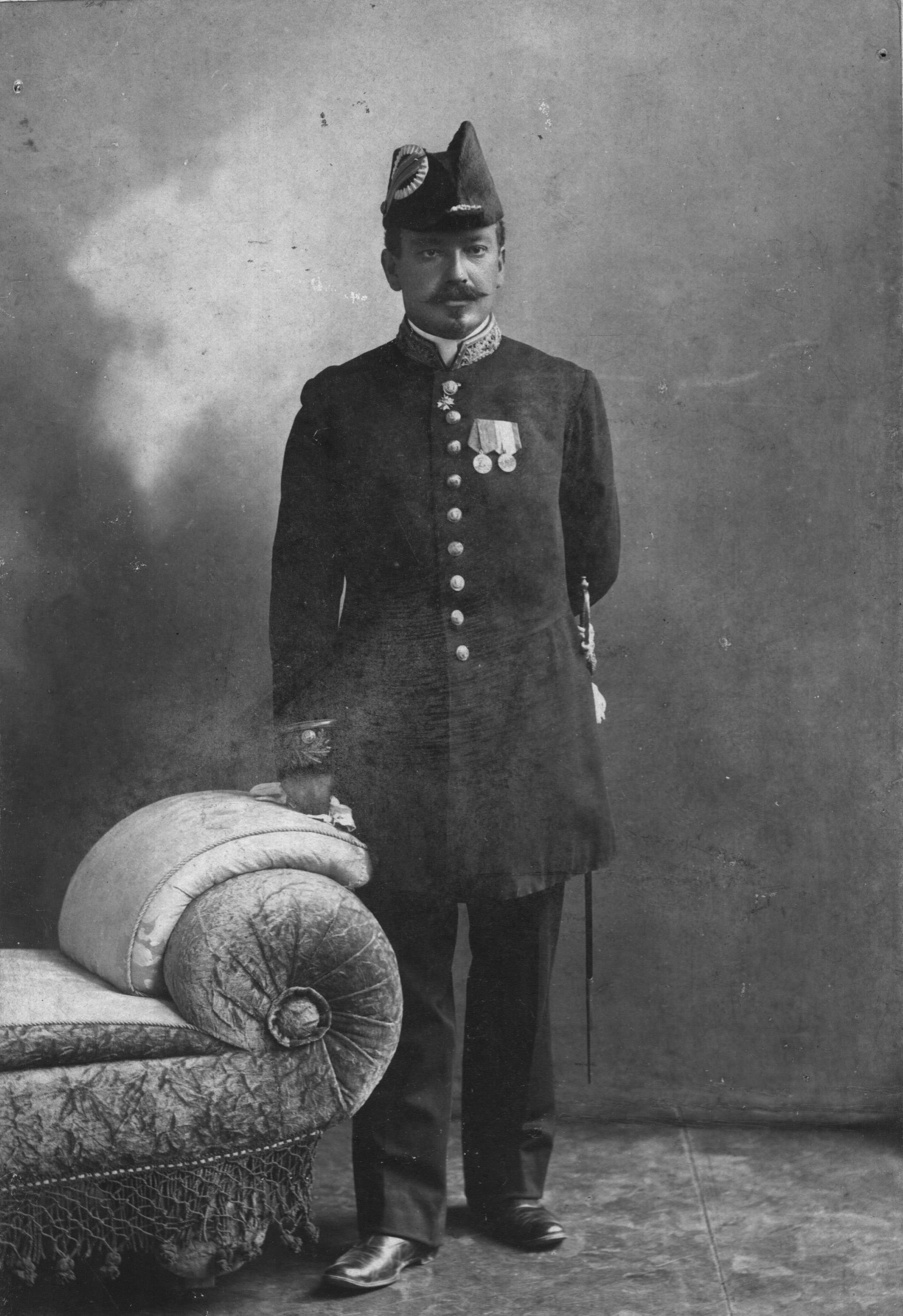
An irrigation official in Tashkent, c. 1904–1908.

The Department of Agriculture and State Property of the Turkestan Governor-Generalship was a regional agency of the Russian Empire responsible for state lands, agrarian policy, and irrigation oversight in Turkestan. It reported both to the relevant imperial ministry and to the Turkestan Governor-General, and was headquartered in Tashkent. The department operated as part of the broader administrative structure of the Turkestan Governor-Generalship.

== History ==
The legal basis for land and water administration was the 1886 Regulations on the Administration of Turkestan, which transferred extensive tracts into the state land fund (kazennye zemli, cf. Crown land) and regulated their use. In 1896 the ministry expanded its presence in the region; by 1897–1898 a dedicated regional department of agriculture and state property had formed. On 6 May 1905 the ministry was reorganised into the Chief Administration for Land Organisation and Agriculture (GUZiZ), to which the regional structures reported.

== Impact of the American Civil War on cotton and import substitution ==
By the 1850s the Russian cotton industry relied overwhelmingly on American raw cotton: in 1853, about 93.5% of Russia’s raw-cotton imports came from the United States (32,607 of 34,884 tons). The American Civil War (1861–1865) and the Union blockade disrupted this Atlantic supply web, forcing European manufacturers—including Russia's—to seek alternative sources. In the following decades imperial policy makers increasingly looked to Central Asia as a substitute supply region. From the 1880s to the 1910s, fiscal incentives, land-tax arrangements, and new irrigation works under the agriculture/land agencies fostered a sustained cotton boom in Turkestan; by 1912 GUZiZ chief Alexander Krivoshein explicitly promoted a “new Turkestan” aimed at cotton self-sufficiency. Engineering programmes in oases such as the Hungry Steppe linked this agrarian turn to large-scale hydraulic projects and the bureaucratic consolidation of “water law.”

== Mandate and structure ==
The department combined ministerial oversight with accountability to the governor-general, reflecting the unique dual subordination characteristic of colonial administration in Turkestan. Unlike regular imperial provinces, the department reported both to the relevant central ministry and to the Turkestan Governor-General, who retained broad discretionary powers over local policy implementation. This arrangement enabled rapid adaptation to frontier conditions while maintaining ministerial technical standards, and was a key feature of the hybrid military-civil system established in the Turkestan Governor-Generalship.

The 1886 Regulations on the Administration of Turkestan provided the legal foundation for the department's extensive land powers, transferring large tracts into the state land fund (kazennye zemli) and establishing bureaucratic control over water rights previously governed by customary law. The statute granted the department authority to survey, classify, and allocate crown lands, regulate irrigation networks, and oversee agricultural development—powers that significantly exceeded those of comparable ministries in European Russia."Положение об управлении Туркестанского края (утв. 1886)". Russian State Library / National Digital Library (in Russian). 1886.

Structurally, the department comprised a chancellery and specialised sections for irrigation/melioration, agronomy and experimental institutions, and the management and leasing of state lands; temporary construction and audit commissions were convened as required. In comparative perspective, historians have drawn explicit parallels between Turkestan's irrigation administration and the canal bureaucracy of British India (PWD), and between agrarian/tenancy oversight and provincial Boards of Agriculture.

== Activities ==
=== Irrigation and water management ===
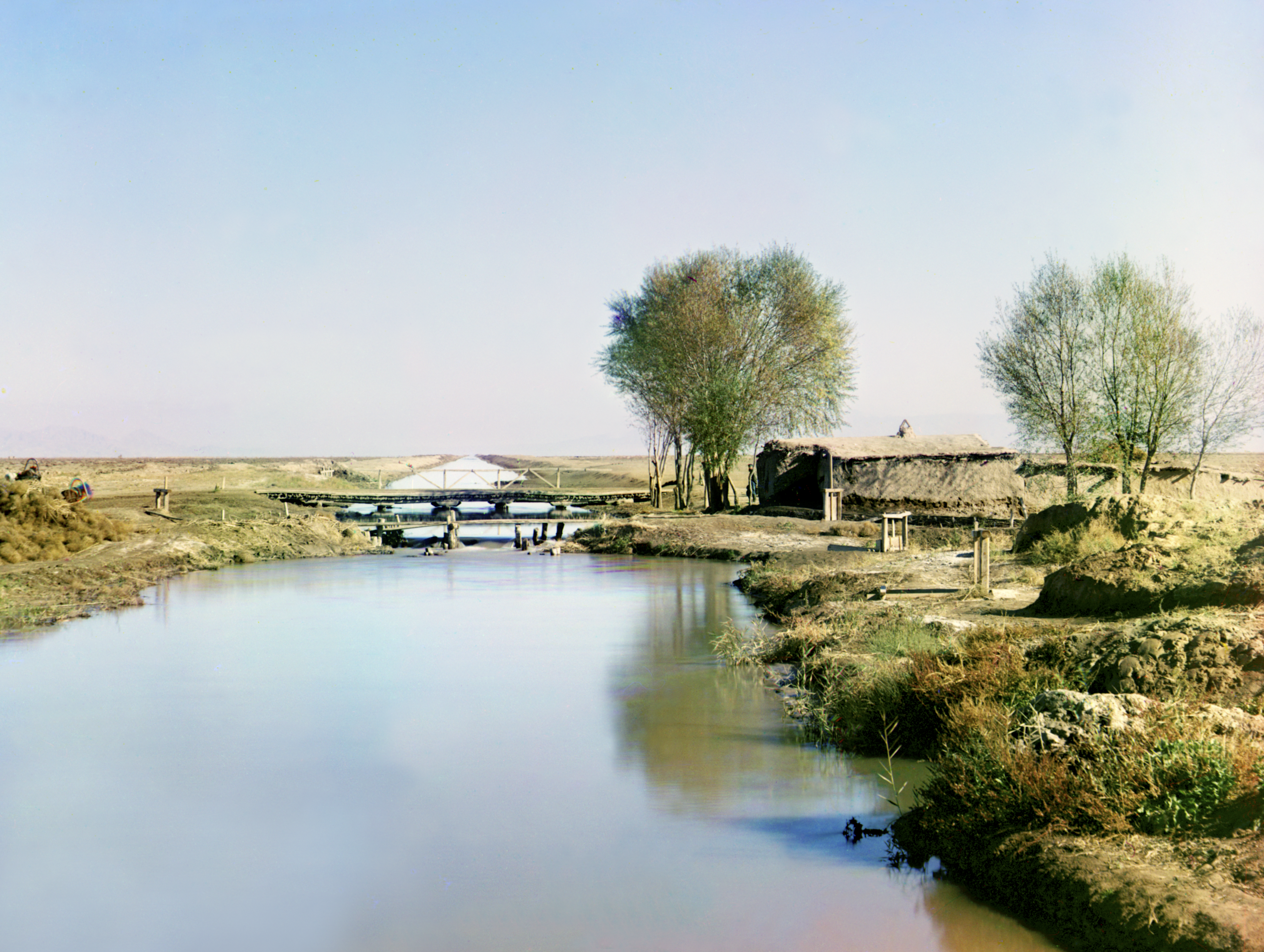
Volynsky Bridge on the Emperor Nicholas I Canal in the Hungry Steppe, 1911. Photograph by Sergey Prokudin-Gorsky (Library of Congress).

From 1899 through the 1910s the department supported major irrigation schemes in the Samarkand, Syr Darya, and Ferghana provinces, including the development of the Hungry Steppe. It prepared and forwarded project materials to central bodies (the Department of Land Improvements, the Technical Committee), and organised inspections and field audits. As projects expanded, verification rules and inter-agency commissions on water use were introduced.

=== Experimental network and training ===
A subordinate network included experimental fields and the Turkestan Agricultural Experimental Station (near the Chimkent road), whose reports appeared under the ministry/GUZiZ imprint; in 1902 a Tashkent agricultural hydrotechnical school opened to train technicians—an institutional mix broadly paralleling agricultural colleges and PWD training pipelines in British India. By the mid-1910s a Turkestan Entomological Station was issuing annual reports on pest monitoring and control (1912–1915).

=== Settlement and colonisation ===
The department prepared lands for resettlement (surveying, reservation, securing irrigation) in coordination with the Resettlement Administration; a contemporary rationale is provided by A. A. Kaufman (1903).

== Leadership and commissions ==
- Head of department (attested 1900): Mikhail Nevyessky (nadvorniy sovetnik).
- Commission on the Hungry Steppe works (c. 1899/1900–1907): chair Nikolai A. Petrov; members Stanislav Ponyatovsky, Andrey Kryuchenko, Andrey A. Mathisen, Luning (Lunding), Konstantin Molchanov, Kirill Kasatkin, R. R. Shreder, N. N. Alexandrov.
- Audit commission (Aug 1907): Stanislav Rauner (chair), K. A. Rukhlov, N. S. Shiryayev, K. S. Gadzecki.

== Uniform ==
In formal settings officials wore the civil uniform prescribed for imperial ministries (dark-green frock coat with velvet collar, bicorne, civil cockade, and sword)—comparable in function (not form) to British civil service dress for ceremonial occasions.

== Historiography ==
Recent scholarship emphasises the environmental and institutional dimensions of imperial rule in Central Asia. Peterson foregrounds irrigation as a driver of legal and administrative change, with imperial norms increasingly superseding customary practices and moving allocation and disputes into ministerial and governor-general domains. Morrison situates administrative development within the longer arc of conquest and provincial governance.

== Legacy and social tensions ==
The department's modernization programs, while economically successful, contributed to social tensions that culminated in the Central Asian revolt of 1916. Land alienation for irrigation projects and settler colonies, combined with the 1916 labour conscription decree, sparked widespread unrest across the region. The systematic transformation of traditional land tenure and water rights created grievances among indigenous populations, particularly nomadic communities whose seasonal grazing lands were converted to permanent agriculture.

== See also ==
- Turkestan Governor-Generalship – parent administrative unit and broader colonial administration
- Hungry Steppe – major irrigation project
- Central Asian revolt of 1916 – uprising partly linked to land policies
- Public Works Department (India) – comparable colonial irrigation administration
- Board of Agriculture (United Kingdom) – institutional parallel
- Crown land – legal framework for state lands

== Bibliography ==
- Abdurakhimova, Nadira A. (2002). "The Colonial System of Power in Turkistan". International Journal of Middle East Studies. 34 (2): 239–262. doi:10.1017/S0020743802002052.
- Brower, Daniel (2003). Turkestan and the Fate of the Russian Empire. London–New York: Routledge. doi:10.4324/9780203605219. ISBN 978-0-415-55889-1.
- Beckert, Sven (2004). "Emancipation and Empire: Reconstructing the Worldwide Web of Cotton Production in the Age of the American Civil War". The American Historical Review. 109 (5): 1405–1438. doi:10.1086/ahr/109.5.1405.
- Blackwell, William L. (1968). Beginnings of Russian Industrialization, 1800–1860. Princeton: Princeton University Press. ISBN 978-0-691-62253-8.
- Crews, Robert D. (2006). For Prophet and Tsar: Islam and Empire in Russia and Central Asia. Cambridge, MA: Harvard University Press. ISBN 978-0-674-02164-8.
- Gilmartin, David (2015). Blood and Water: The Indus River Basin in Modern History. Oakland: University of California Press. ISBN 978-0-520-35553-8.
- Morrison, Alexander (2008). Russian Rule in Samarkand, 1868–1910: A Comparison with British India. Oxford Historical Monographs. Oxford: Oxford University Press. ISBN 978-0-19-954737-1.
- Morrison, Alexander (2012). "The Pahlen Report and Pereselenie in Turkestan, 1908–1910" (PDF). Acta Slavica Iaponica. 31: 1–29.
- Morrison, Alexander (2021). The Russian Conquest of Central Asia: A Study in Imperial Expansion, 1814–1914. Cambridge: Cambridge University Press. doi:10.1017/9781139343381. ISBN 978-1-107-03030-5.
- Obertreis, Julia (2017). Imperial Desert Dreams: Cotton Growing and Irrigation in Central Asia, 1860–1991. Göttingen: V&R unipress. ISBN 978-3-8471-0786-6.
- Penati, Beatrice (2013). "The Cotton Boom and the Land Tax in Russian Turkestan (1880s–1915)". Kritika: Explorations in Russian and Eurasian History. 14 (4): 741–774. doi:10.1353/kri.2013.0060.
- Peterson, Maya K. (2016). "Engineering Empire: Russian and foreign hydraulic experts in Central Asia, 1887–1917". Cahiers du monde russe. 57 (1): 125–146. doi:10.4000/monderusse.8336.
- Peterson, Maya K. (2019). Pipe Dreams: Water and Empire in Central Asia's Aral Sea Basin. Cambridge: Cambridge University Press. doi:10.1017/9781108673075. ISBN 978-1-108-47547-1.
- Sahadeo, Jeff (2007). Russian Colonial Society in Tashkent, 1865–1923. Bloomington: Indiana University Press. ISBN 978-0-253-22279-4.
- Sartori, Paolo (2016). Visions of Justice: Sharīʿa and Cultural Change in Russian Central Asia. Leiden–Boston: Brill. doi:10.1163/9789004330900. ISBN 978-90-04-33089-4.
- Sunderland, Willard (2004). Taming the Wild Field: Colonization and Empire on the Russian Steppe. Ithaca–London: Cornell University Press. ISBN 978-0-8014-7347-0.
- Stone, Ian (1984). Canal Irrigation in British India: Perspectives on Technological Change in a Peasant Economy. Cambridge: Cambridge University Press. ISBN 978-0-521-25023-8.
- Uvarov, Boris P. (1921). "A Revision of the Genus Locusta, L. (= Pachytylus, Fieb.), with a New Theory as to the Periodicity and Migrations of Locusts". Bulletin of Entomological Research. 12 (2): 135–163. doi:10.1017/S0007485300044989.
