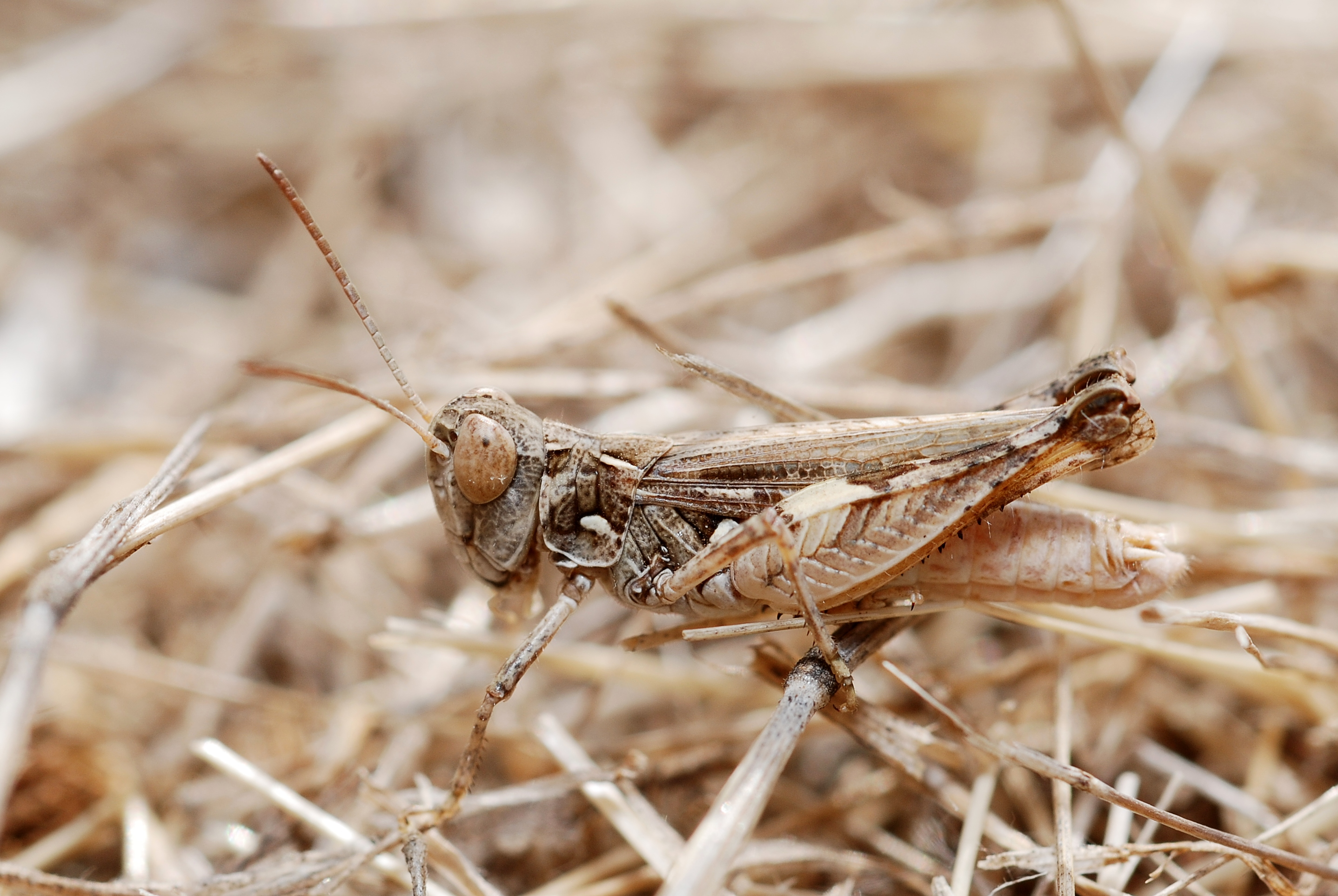
- Dociostaurus sp. male & female (below)
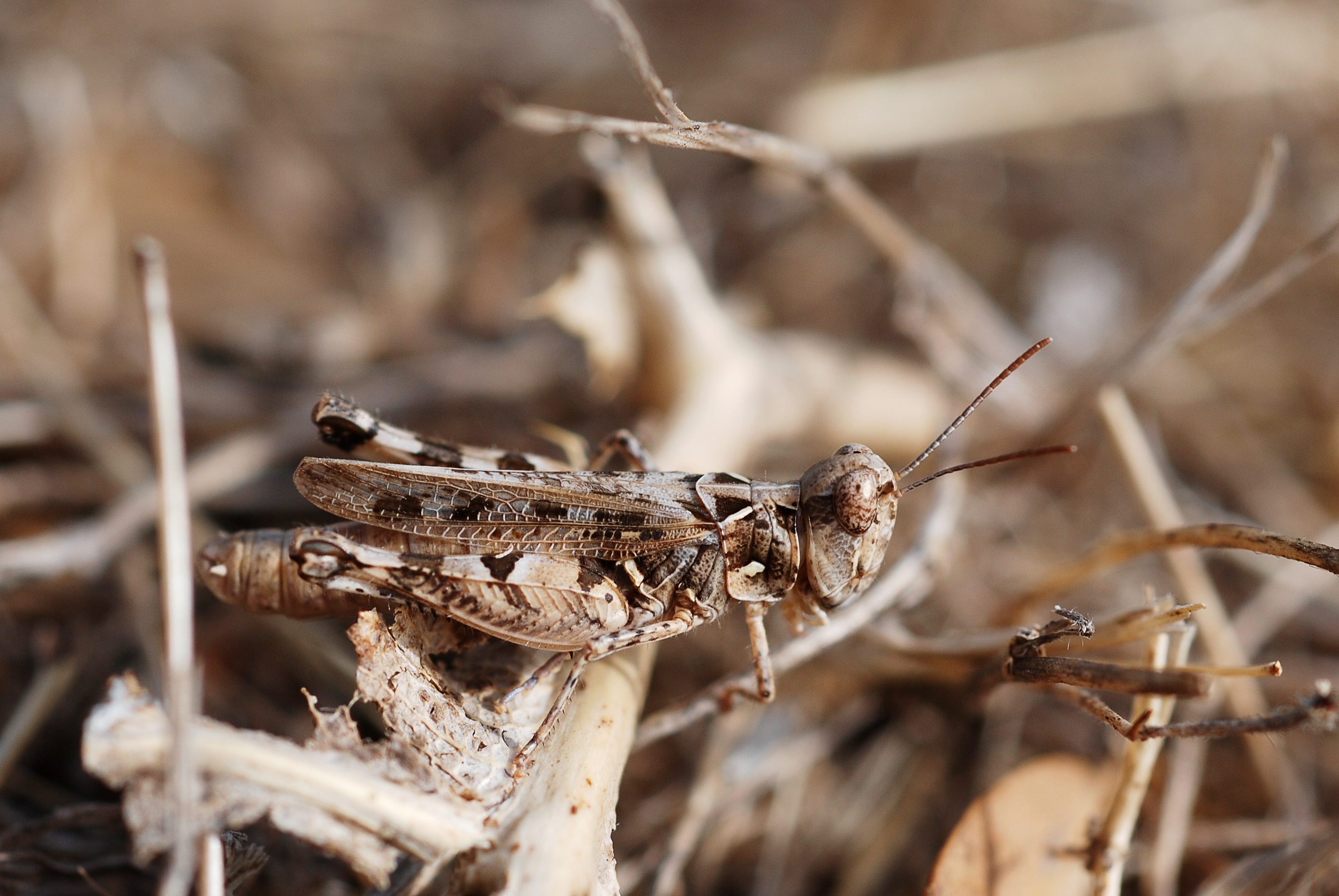

Scientific classification
- Kingdom: Animalia
- Phylum: Arthropoda
- Clade: Pancrustacea
- Class: Insecta
- Order: Orthoptera
- Suborder: Caelifera
- Family: Acrididae
- Tribe: Dociostaurini
- Genus: Dociostaurus; Fieber, 1853

Synonyms
- Stauronotus Fischer, 1853 (for nominate subgenus)

= Dociostaurus =

Genus of grasshoppers

Dociostaurus is a genus of grasshoppers in the family Acrididae, subfamily Gomphocerinae and typical of the tribe Dociostaurini. Species are found in Africa, southern Europe and Asia, and includes the economically important Moroccan locust.

== Subgenera and Species ==
The Orthoptera Species File lists:

- unplaced: Dociostaurus biskrensis Moussi & Petit, 2014

subgenus Dociostaurus Fieber, 1853

1. Dociostaurus ciostaurus Fieber, 1853
2. Dociostaurus apicalis (Walker, 1871)
3. Dociostaurus australis (Bolívar, 1889)
4. Dociostaurus brachypterus Demirsoy, 1979
5. Dociostaurus cephalotes Uvarov, 1923
6. Dociostaurus curvicercus Uvarov, 1942
7. Dociostaurus diamesus Bey-Bienko, 1948
8. Dociostaurus hammadae Ingrisch, 1983
9. Dociostaurus hispanicus Bolívar, 1898
10. Dociostaurus histrio (Fischer von Waldheim, 1846)
11. Dociostaurus kervillei Bolívar, 1911
12. Dociostaurus maroccanus (Thunberg, 1815)
  type species (as Gryllus maroccanus Thunberg)
13. Dociostaurus minutus La Greca, 1962
14. Dociostaurus pecularis Moeed, 1971
15. Dociostaurus plotnikovi Uvarov, 1921
16. Dociostaurus salmani Demirsoy, 1979
17. Dociostaurus turbatus (Walker, 1871)

subgenus Kazakia Bey-Bienko, 1933

1. Dociostaurus brevicollis (Eversmann, 1848)
2. Dociostaurus genei (Ocskay, 1832)
3. Dociostaurus icconium Sirin & Mol, 2013
4. Dociostaurus jagoi Soltani, 1978
5. Dociostaurus tarbinskyi (Bey-Bienko, 1933)
6. Dociostaurus tartarus Stshelkanovtzev, 1921

subgenus Stauronotulus Tarbinsky, 1940

1. Dociostaurus brachypterus Liu, 1981 [temporary name]
2. Dociostaurus cappadocicus (Azam, 1913)
3. Dociostaurus crassiusculus (Pantel, 1886)
4. Dociostaurus dantini Bolívar, 1914
5. Dociostaurus hauensteini (Bolívar, 1893)
6. Dociostaurus kraussi (Ingenitskii, 1897)
7. Dociostaurus kurdus Uvarov, 1921

== Gallery ==
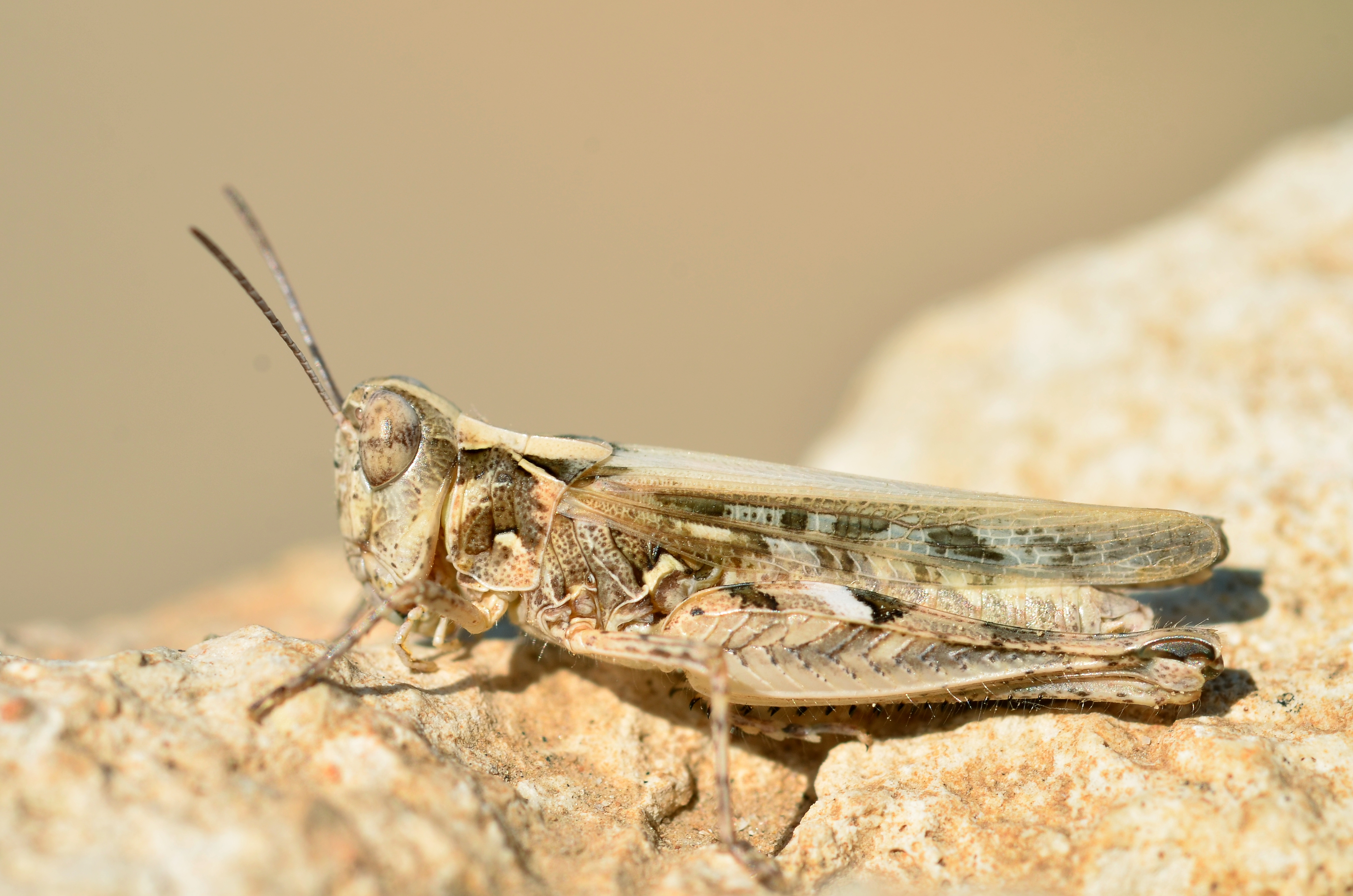
D. cf. jagoi female

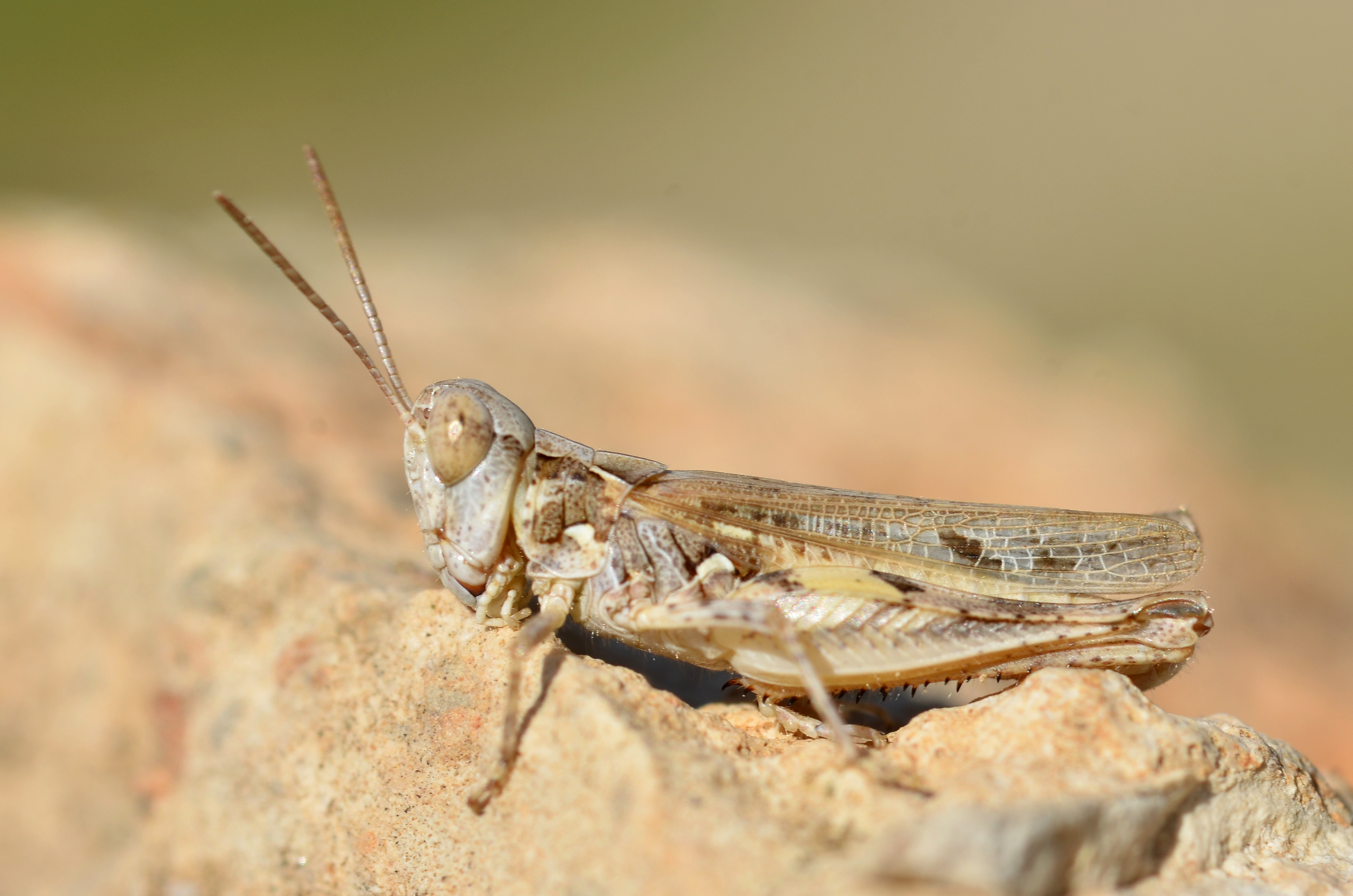
D. cf. jagoi male

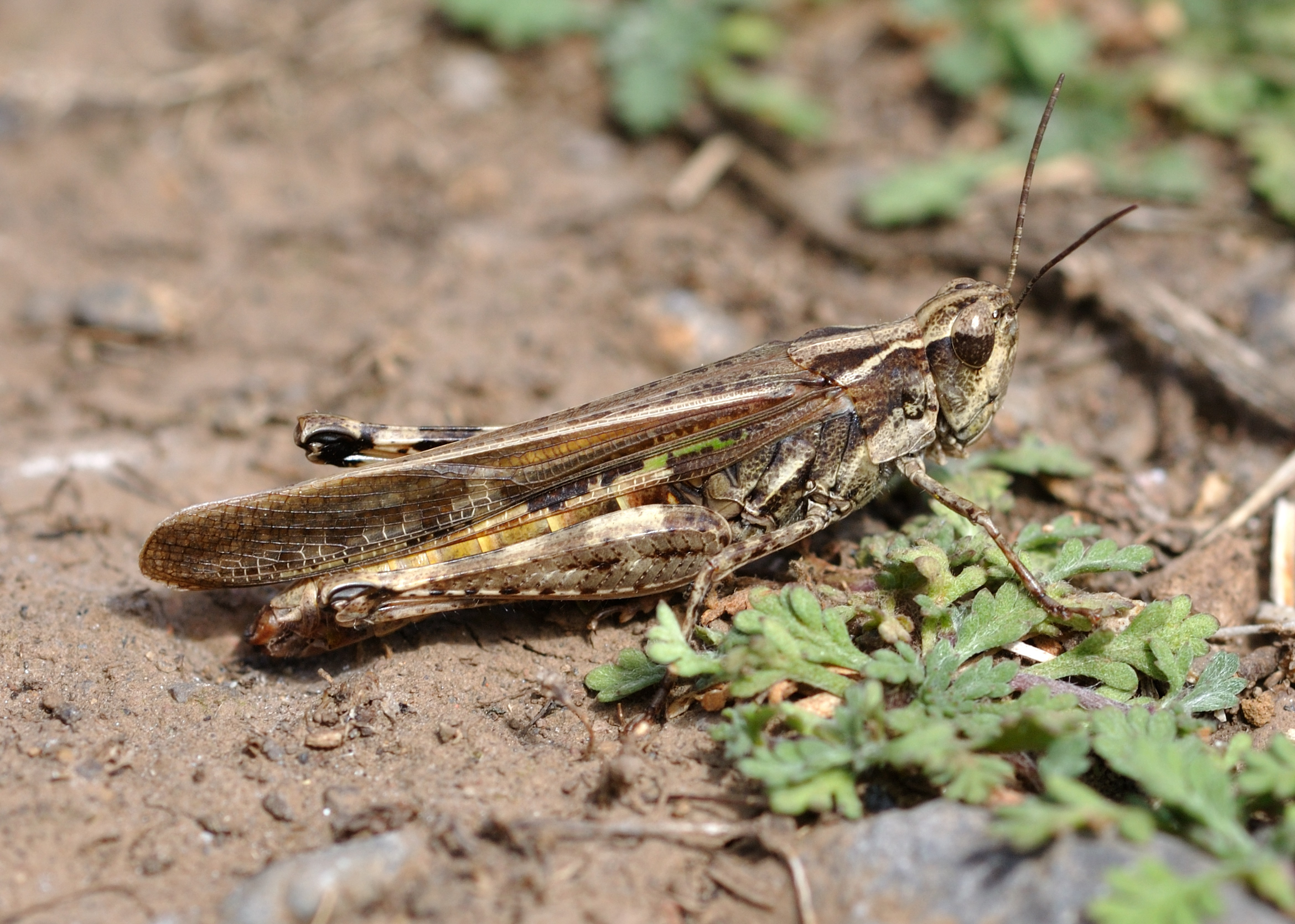
D. maroccanus

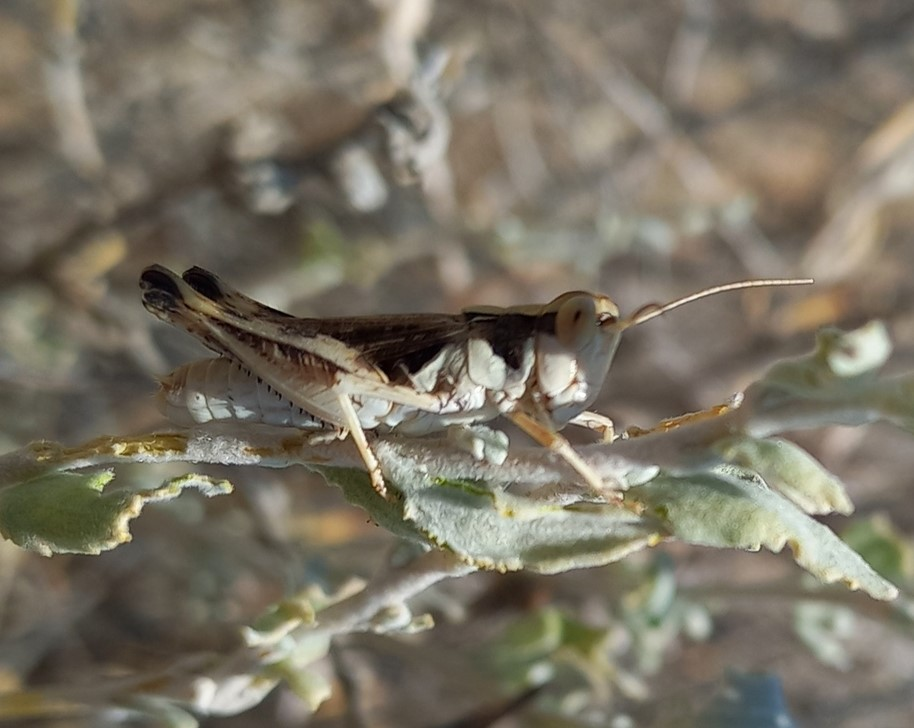
D. plotnikovi
