= Plotnikovia =

Plotnikovia may refer to:

- a monotypic genus of central Asian grasshoppers in the subfamily Conophyminae, described by Umnov in 1930
- a genus of marine worms in the Opisthorchiidae, described by Skrjabin in 1945
