= Dociostaurus maroccanus =

Scientific classification
- Kingdom: Animalia
- Phylum: Arthropoda
- Class: Insecta
- Order: Orthoptera
- Suborder: Caelifera
- Family: Acrididae
- Subfamily: Gomphocerinae
- Tribe: Dociostaurini
- Genus: Dociostaurus
- Species: D. maroccanus

Binomial name
- Dociostaurus maroccanus (Thunberg, 1815)

Synonyms
- D. maroccanus degeneratus Baranov, 1925; D. maroccanus xanthocnema Tarbinsky 1932; Epacromia oceanica Walker, 1870; Gryllus cruciatus Charpentier, 1825; Gryllus maroccanus Thunberg, 1815; Oedaleus pendulus Steinmann, 1965; Oedipoda vastator Fischer Von Waldheim, 1833; Stauronotus maroccanus (Thunberg, 1815); Stauronotus vastator (Fischer Von Waldheim, 1833)

Species of grasshopper

Dociostaurus maroccanus, commonly known as the Moroccan locust, is a grasshopper in the insect family Acrididae. It is found in northern Africa, southern and eastern Europe and western Asia. It lives a solitary existence but in some years its numbers increase sharply, and it becomes gregarious and congregates to form swarms which can cause devastation in agricultural areas. The species was first described by Carl Peter Thunberg in 1815.

== Distribution ==
The range of the Moroccan locust extends from the Canary Islands and Madeira in the west to Kazakhstan and Afghanistan in the east. In Africa it is found in Algeria, Egypt, Libya, Morocco and Tunisia. In Europe it is found in France, Portugal, Spain, Italy and the Balkan peninsula. It is also found in the Middle East (e.g. Gilan province of Iran), and Central Asia.

== Description ==
The eggs are laid in pods with about thirty eggs each. The nymphs ("hoppers") resemble wingless adults. They moult five times, each instar having larger wing pads. The adult female locust is 20 to 38 millimetres long and the male 16 to 28 millimetres long. The body colour is yellowish gray with dark patches. There is a creamy coloured cross-shape on the prothorax. The elytra are large and transparent, sometimes speckled with brown, and the wings are colourless and strongly veined. The hind legs are powerful, the femur often being banded with black while the tibia is usually red. The time taken from hatching to maturity is about thirty days.

== Ecology ==
The Moroccan locust lives in arid areas between 500 and 1000 metres above sea level. It breeds in undisturbed soil and does not reproduce in arable fields. The optimum rainfall for development in the months from March to May is one hundred millimetres. If the spring is unusually hot and precipitation is low, and especially if it is the second dry spring in succession, numbers of young locusts can increase dramatically. Mass outbreaks of nymphs occur and destroy the vegetation where they hatch. From the second instar stage onwards, the hoppers aggregate and the population density can reach several thousand nymphs per square metre. The hoppers move downhill to fertile regions damaging crops as they go. Multiple generations can be present, and the numbers of adults can build up rapidly, reaching 300 individuals per square metre in extreme cases. Winged adults take flight en masse at low altitudes, travelling at eight to ten metres per second and may migrate sixty kilometres during the season. Numbers begin to diminish in June when the vegetation is also declining.

This locust has traditionally been considered a serious agricultural threat. Its large numbers, voracious appetite, ability to eat almost all forms of vegetation and ability to migrate in swarms make it a feared pest. However, outbreaks of swarming activity have diminished in recent years and in some areas the Moroccan locust has become rare. This is particularly noticeable in European countries where, with the notable exception of Sardinia (Italy), the species no longer seems to be an economic threat while in north Africa and parts of central Asia it still flourishes. These alterations in population dynamics may be due to a change in climatic conditions with a decrease in spring rainfall. A more important factor may be the increase of cropland at the expense of grassland, since the female needs undisturbed soil in which to deposit her eggs. At the other extreme, overgrazing and deforestation in some areas provide a favourable environment for the species to thrive and remain destructive.

In a study in Iran in 1956 it was found that outbreaks of locusts originated from just eight distinct areas. All these districts were in mountain foothills that had been forested or in other rolling foothills. In all cases the vegetation consisted of annual grasses or shrub steppe communities with annual grasses and dwarf shrubs. There was a good supply of green food in winter which increased the longevity and fertility of the females. Outside these districts, the Moroccan locust had solitary populations whereas inside them, in some years, the locust became gregarious. The locust needs firm, bare soil for egg laying and when they hatch, the nymphs move to progressively taller and denser vegetation. These districts principally had rainfall in winter and early spring, averaging 250 to 350 millimetres. The temperature averaged about 17 °C in the months immediately before and after egg laying. The sites were heavily grazed by sheep and goats, especially in winter. The conclusion of the study was that quite specific climate, vegetation, and topographical conditions were needed for breeding to take place.

Stridulation

== Photo gallery ==
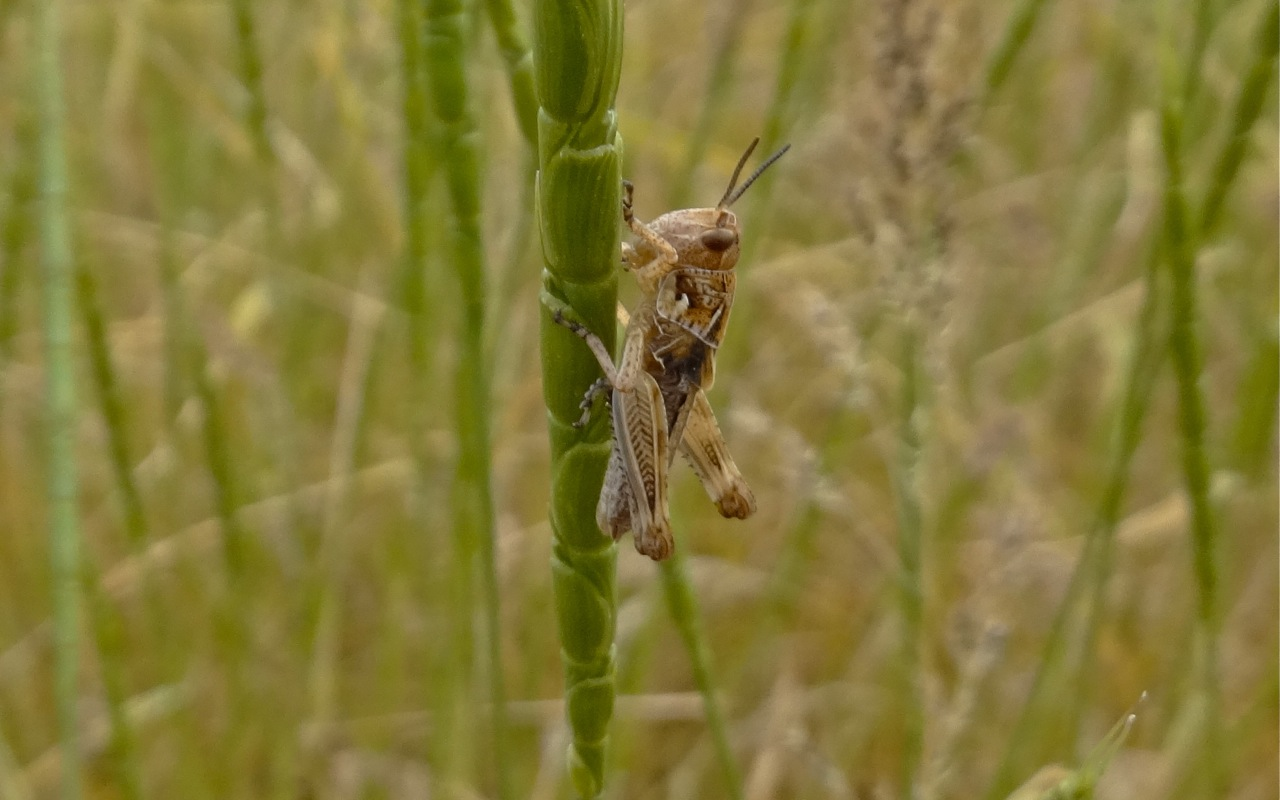
Fourth instar

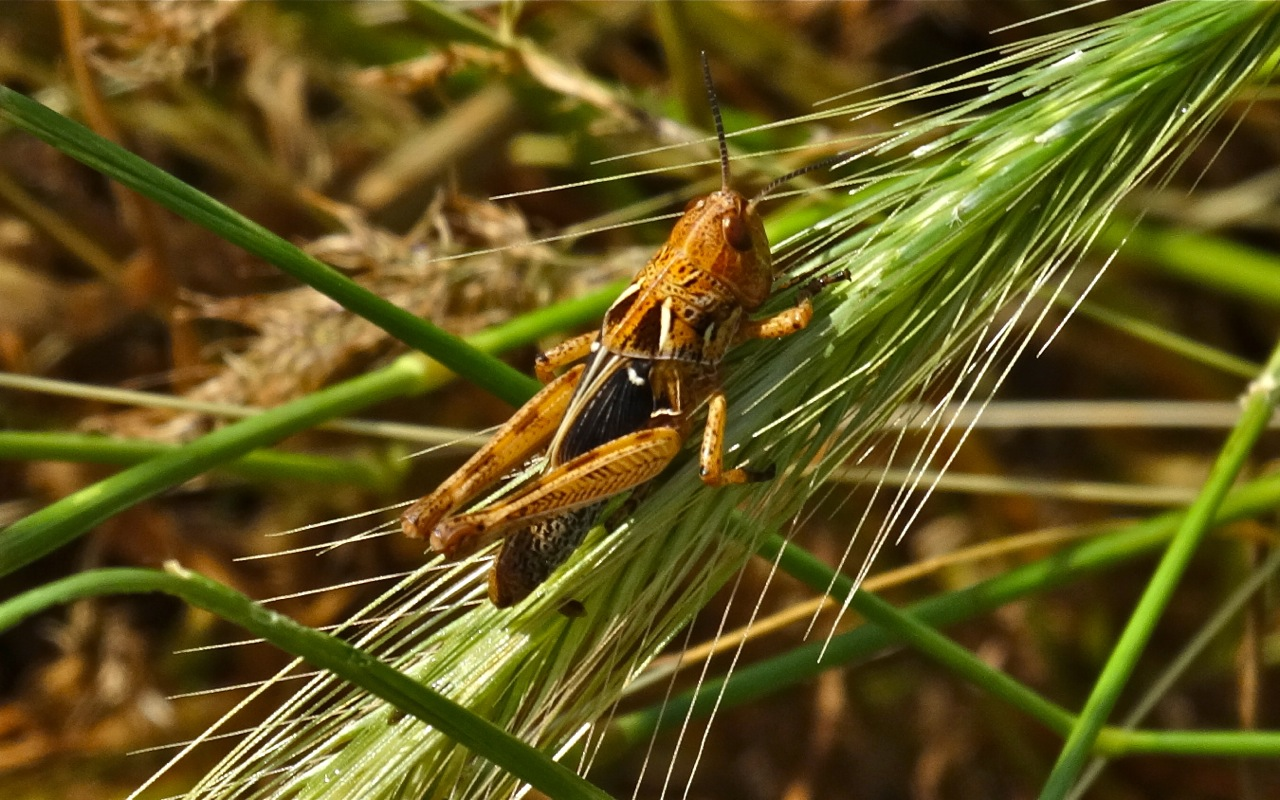
Fifth instar

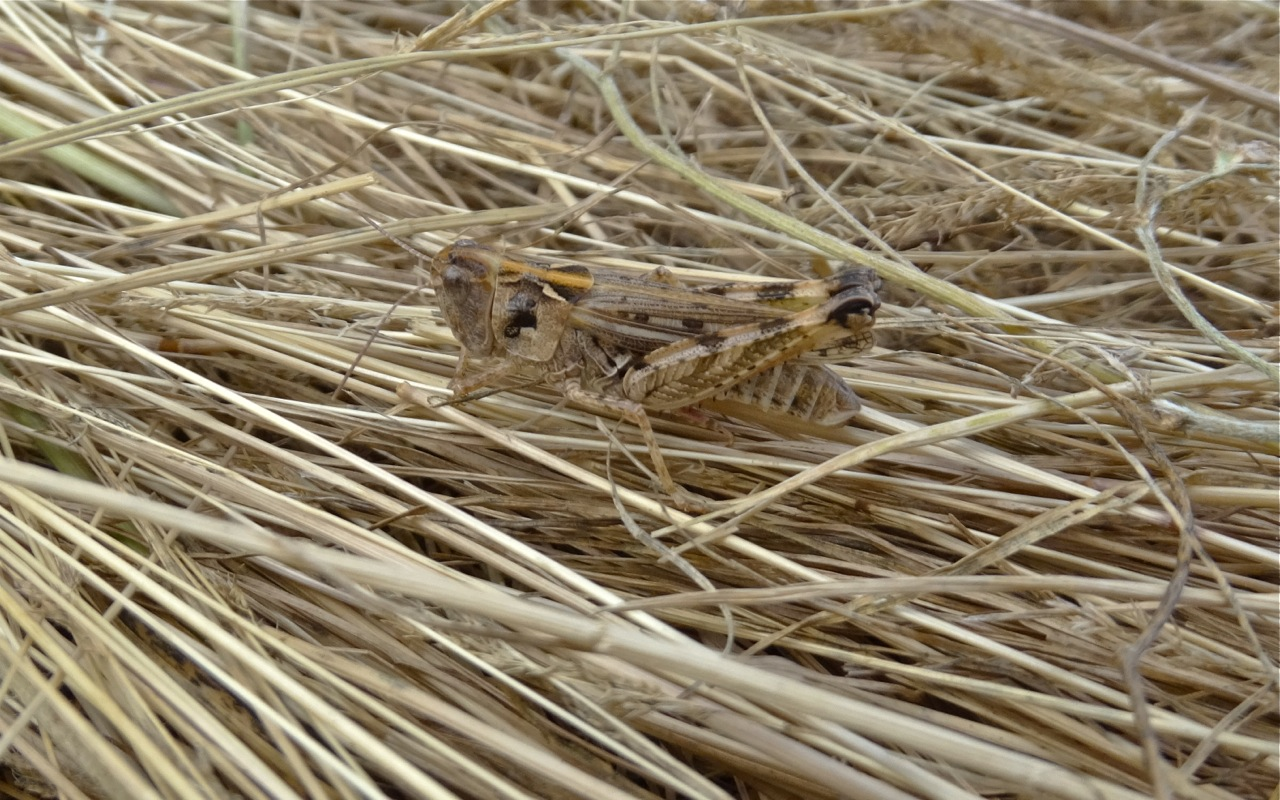
Male

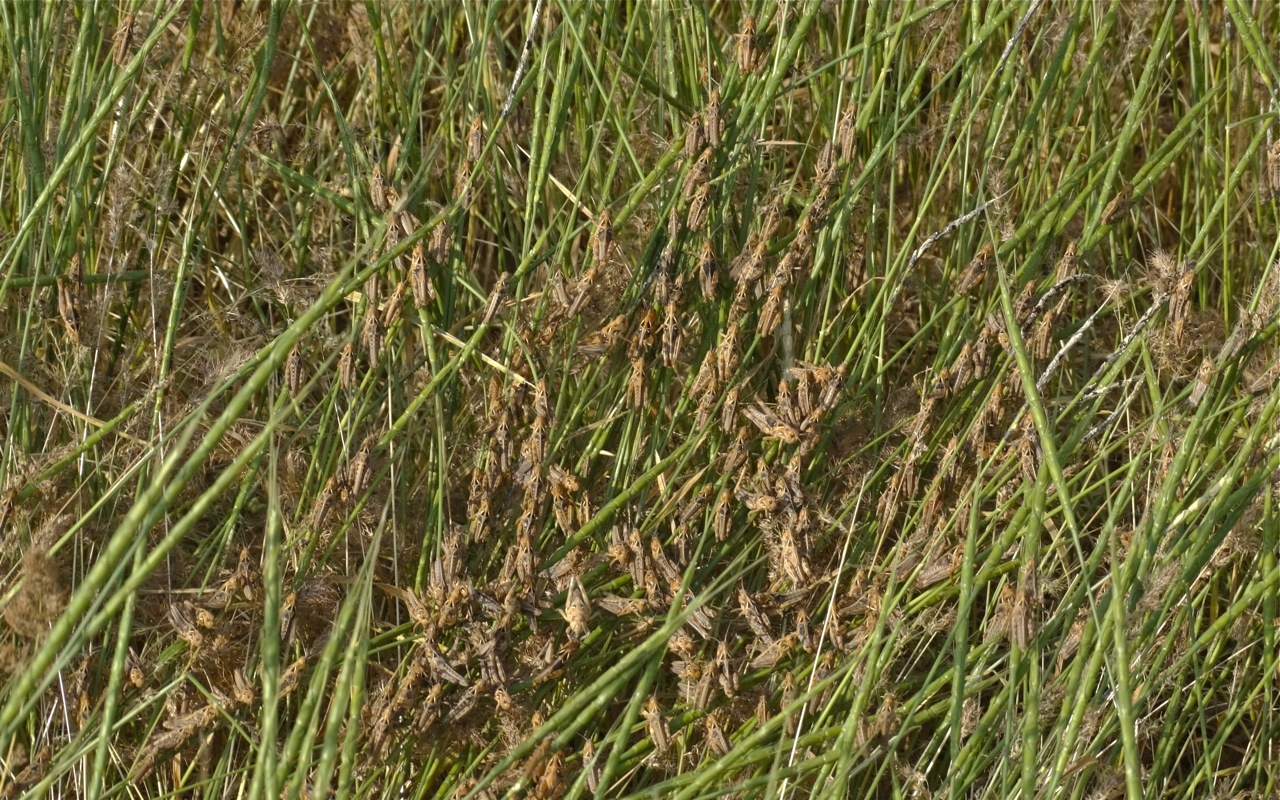
Hopper band in Kazakhstan

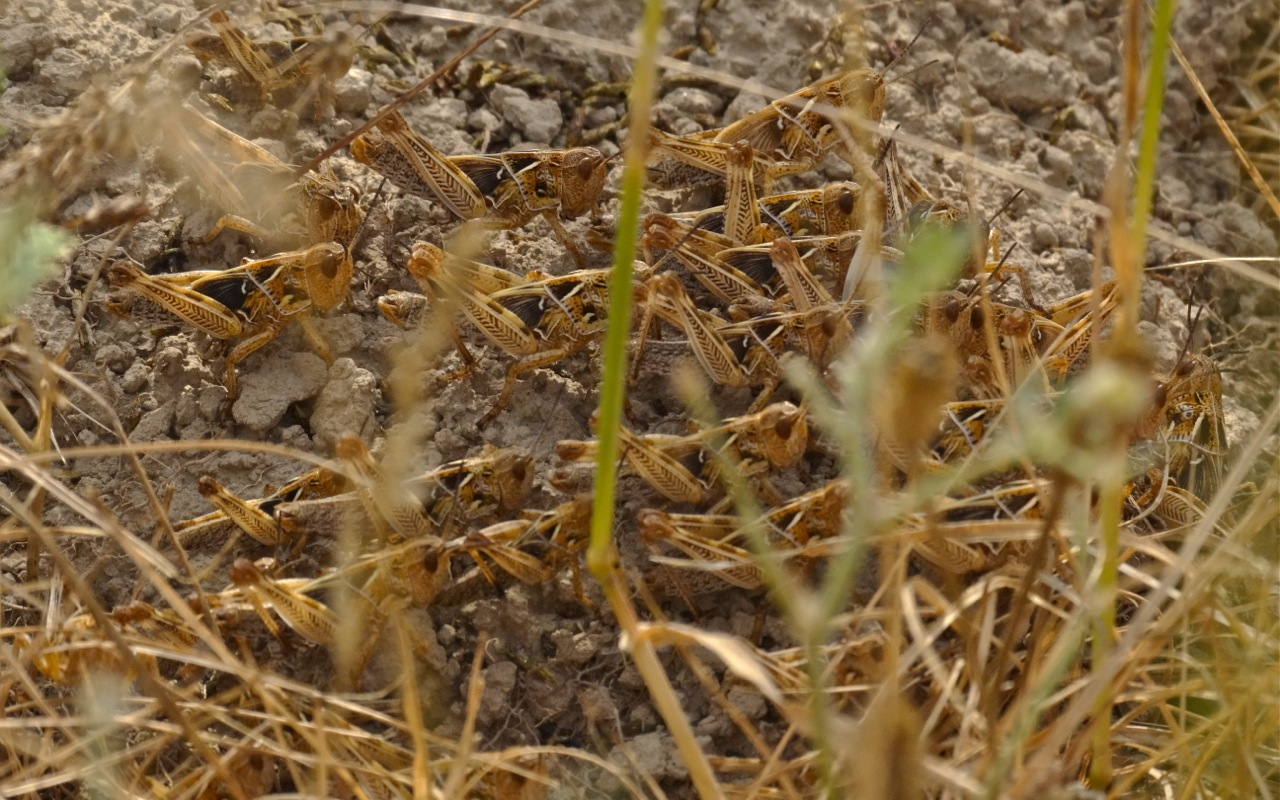
Hopper band detail
