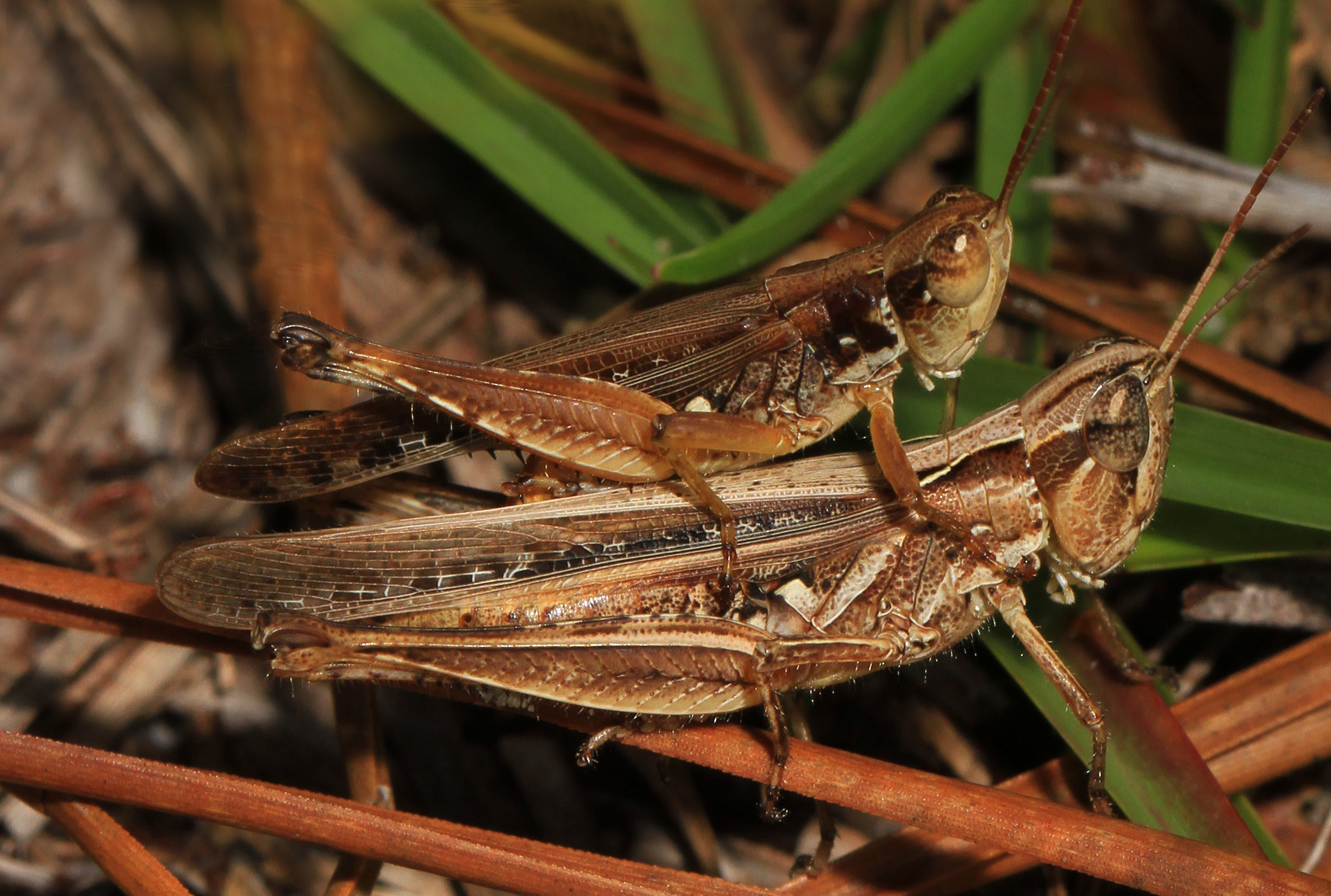

Scientific classification
- Kingdom: Animalia
- Phylum: Arthropoda
- Class: Insecta
- Order: Orthoptera
- Suborder: Caelifera
- Family: Acrididae
- Genus: Orphulella
- Species: O. pelidna

Binomial name
- Orphulella pelidna (Burmeister, 1838)

= Orphulella pelidna =

Species of grasshopper

Orphulella pelidna, the spotted-winged grasshopper, is a species of slant-faced grasshopper in the family Acrididae. It is found in the Caribbean Sea, Central America, North America, and the Caribbean.

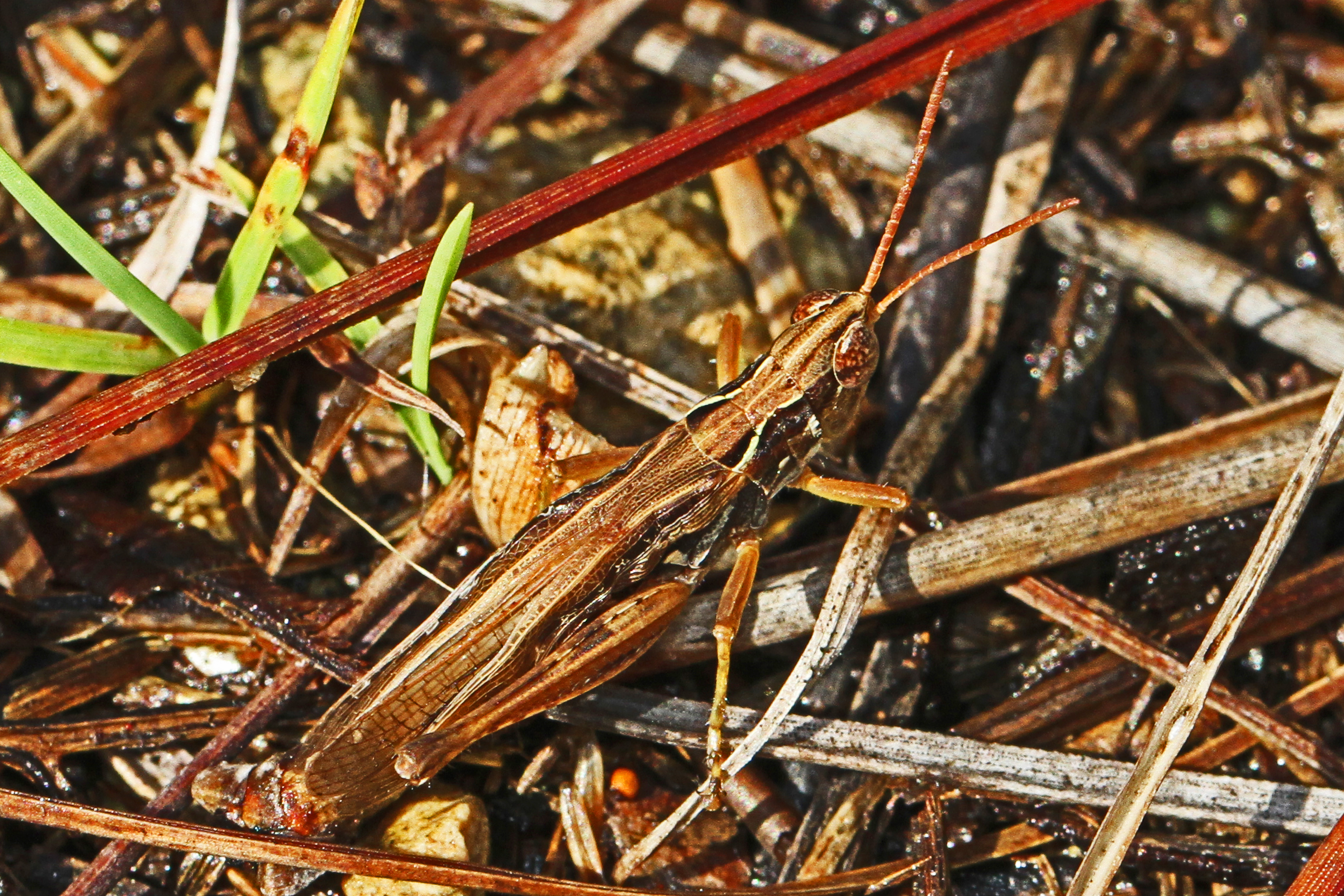
Spotted-winged grasshopper, Orphulella pelidna
