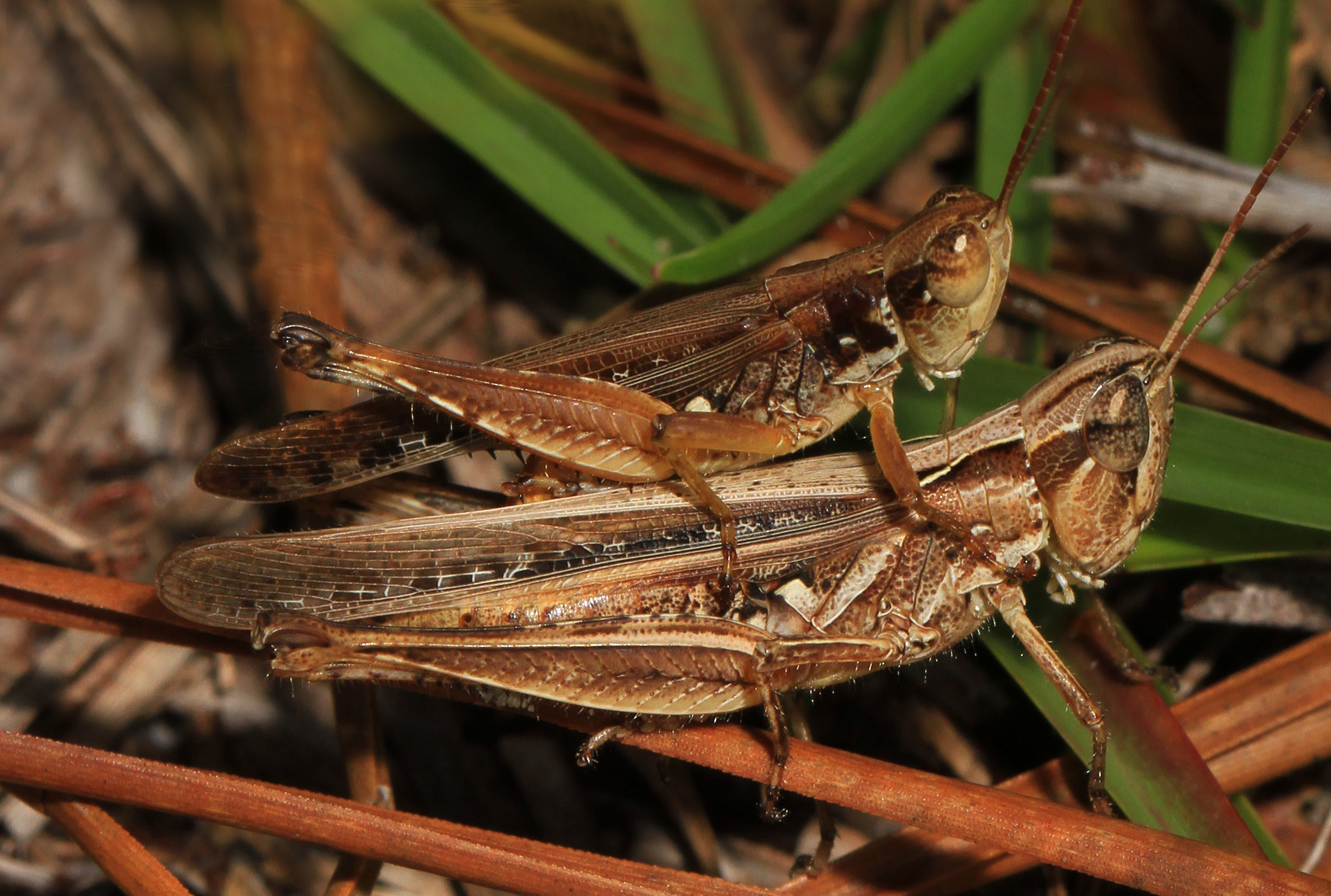
- Orphulella pelidna

Scientific classification
- Domain: Eukaryota
- Kingdom: Animalia
- Phylum: Arthropoda
- Class: Insecta
- Order: Orthoptera
- Suborder: Caelifera
- Family: Acrididae
- Subfamily: Gomphocerinae
- Genus: Orphulella; Giglio-Tos, 1894

= Orphulella =

Genus of grasshoppers

Orphulella is a genus of slant-faced grasshoppers in the family Acrididae. There are more than 20 described species in Orphulella, all found in the Americas.

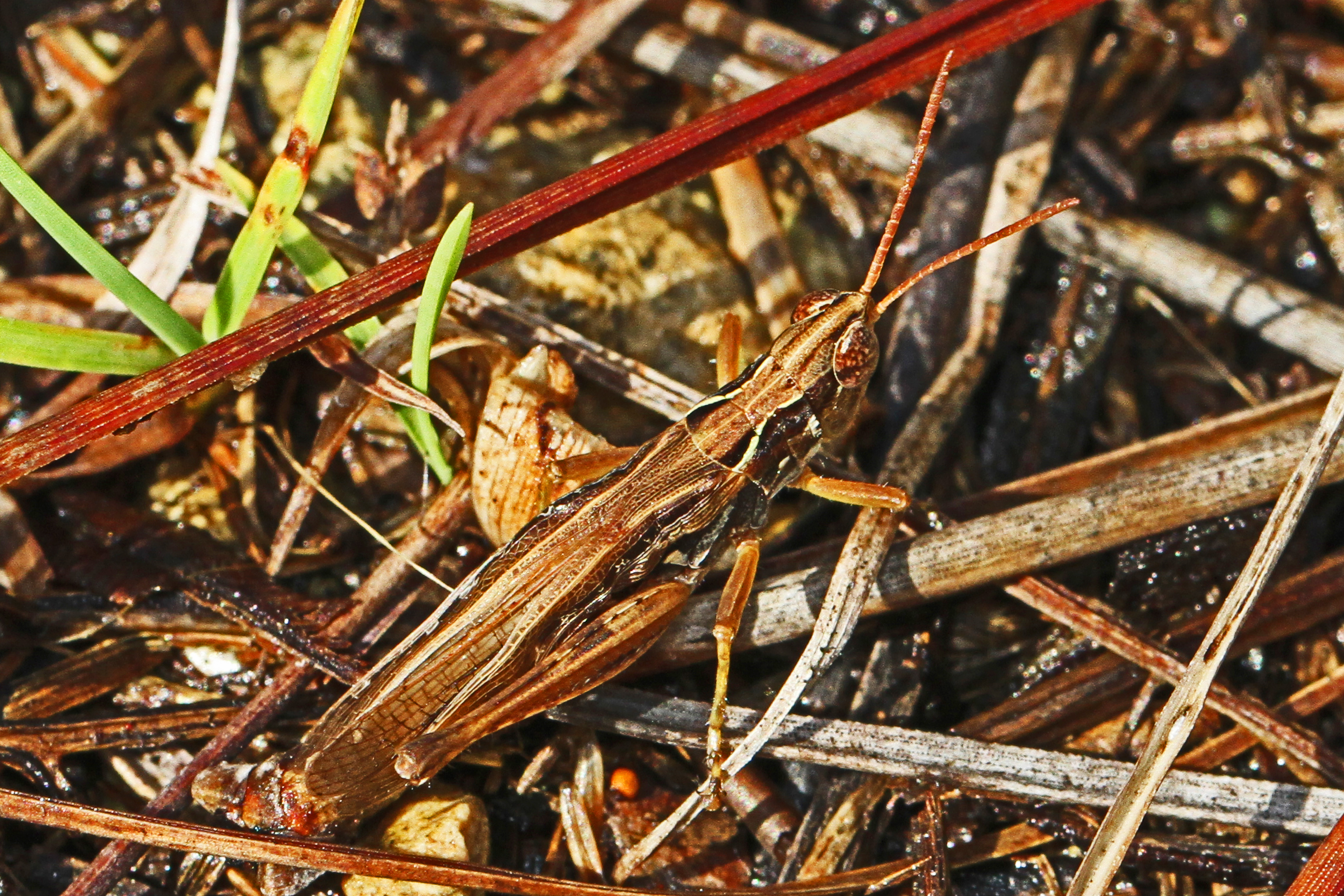
Orphulella pelidna

== Species ==
These 24 species belong to the genus Orphulella:

- Orphulella abbreviata (Scudder, 1869)
- Orphulella aculeata Rehn, 1900
- Orphulella brachyptera Rehn & Hebard, 1938
- Orphulella chumpi Cigliano, Pocco & Lange, 2011
- Orphulella concinnula (Walker, 1870)
- Orphulella decisa (Walker, 1870)
- Orphulella elongata Bruner, 1911
- Orphulella fluvialis Otte, 1979
- Orphulella gemma Otte, 1979
- Orphulella losamatensis Caudell, 1909
- Orphulella nesicos Otte, 1979
- Orphulella orizabae (McNeill, 1897)
- Orphulella paraguayensis (Rehn, 1906)
- Orphulella patruelis (Bolívar, 1896)
- Orphulella pelidna (Burmeister, 1838) (spotted-winged grasshopper)
- Orphulella pernix Otte, 1979
- Orphulella punctata (De Geer, 1773)
- Orphulella quiroga Otte, 1979
- Orphulella scudderi (Bolívar, 1888)
- Orphulella speciosa (Scudder, 1863) (slant-faced pasture grasshopper)
- Orphulella timida Otte, 1979
- Orphulella tolteca (Saussure, 1861)
- Orphulella trypha Otte, 1979
- Orphulella vittifrons (Walker, 1870)
