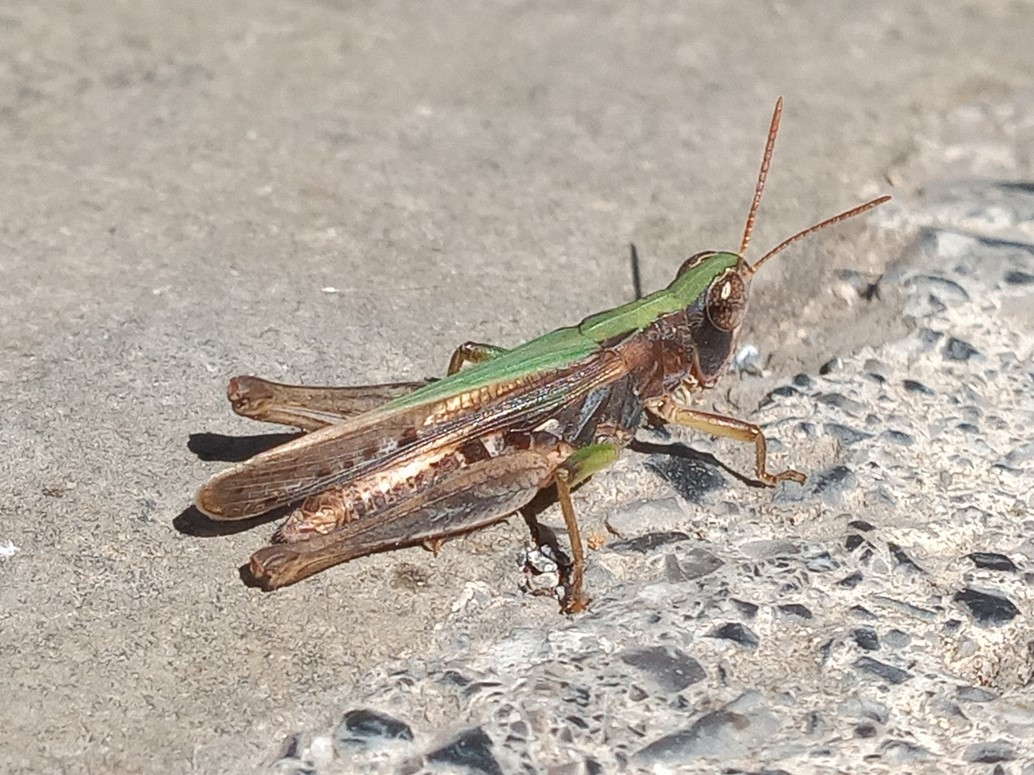

Scientific classification
- Kingdom: Animalia
- Phylum: Arthropoda
- Class: Insecta
- Order: Orthoptera
- Suborder: Caelifera
- Family: Acrididae
- Genus: Orphulella
- Species: O. speciosa

Binomial name
- Orphulella speciosa (Scudder, S.H., 1862)

= Orphulella speciosa =

Species of grasshopper

Orphulella speciosa, commonly known as the slant-faced pasture grasshopper, is a species of short-horned grasshopper in the family Acrididae.

== Distribution and habitat ==
Orphulella speciosa occurs east of the Rocky Mountain region all the way to the Coast of the Atlantic. It also occurs in the southern region of Canada and in the northern region of Mexico. O. speciosa inhabits areas of tallgrass and mixed grass prairies, often preferring areas of shorter grass that are interspersed throughout the prairie plant matrix, including grasses that have been grazed upon by larger animals. At the southern end of the range (e.g., in Texas), adult O. speciosa are most abundant during August to October, with fewer adults present from May to December. In the northern extent of its range (e.g., New England) adult O. speciosa are most abundant during the months of July and August.

== Identification ==
Orphulella speciosa has a very slanted face. The margins of the vertex of the head (the top of the head, located between the eyes) are less raised. The foveola (a small dent in the integument) is not distinct. The pronotal disks are found at the top of the first thoracic segment and are almost equivalent in width in the front and back. The principal sulcus on the pronotum, which is a ridge that cuts the middle of the outer integument, cuts the prenatal disk a little past the middle. The tegmina (the leathery, slender forewings extend to the end of the hind femora, and curve in towards the apex. The males' hind femora often vary in size from 1.5 mm to 3mm from the end of the femora. O. speciosa are sexually dimorphic; the females are much larger than the males. Female body sizes range from 16-21.5 mm with antennae that are 5-6mm long, tegmina that are 9-16mm long, and hind femora that are 9.5–12 mm long. Males range from 13-14mm in total length with antennae 4.5-6.5mm in length, tegmina, 101–13 mm in length, and hind femora are 8.5–10 mm in length. On lower end of the lateral lobes (the vertical sides of the pronotum of the males, there is a pale curved line. O. speciosa individuals exhibit much variation in color, especially combinations of green and brown. Females are often light green with a dark coloration on the vertex of the head. Females are occasionally brown and have a line on the sides of the pronotum. O. speciosa looks very similar to a related species in the same genus, O. pelidna. These two species can be identified from one another by looking at the fastigium (the part of the head that is located in between the eyes of the grasshoppers and their size. O.speciosa has a small median ridge on the fastigium and is much smaller than O. pelidna. O. pelidna has a semicircular indentation that is set farther back than on O. speciosa, and O. pelidna has a lateral carinae that is incised twice.

== Nymphal development ==
Like all grasshoppers, nymphs of O. speciosa have incomplete metamorphosis: their nymphs are born looking similar to the adults, and they go through five instar stages (4 different molting events) until they reach the adult stage. First and second instars have patterns of green on their heads; however, the antennae are terminally expanded (they grow from the head outwards) . Second instars have antennae that are flat and are pointed at the end. The hind femora of the first and second instars appear tan and they have a green thorax. Instars II to V have filiform, or threadlike, antennae. Third and fourth instars have tan, brown, green, and gray body color patterns, and their hind femora appear fuscous (brownish-gray) .
