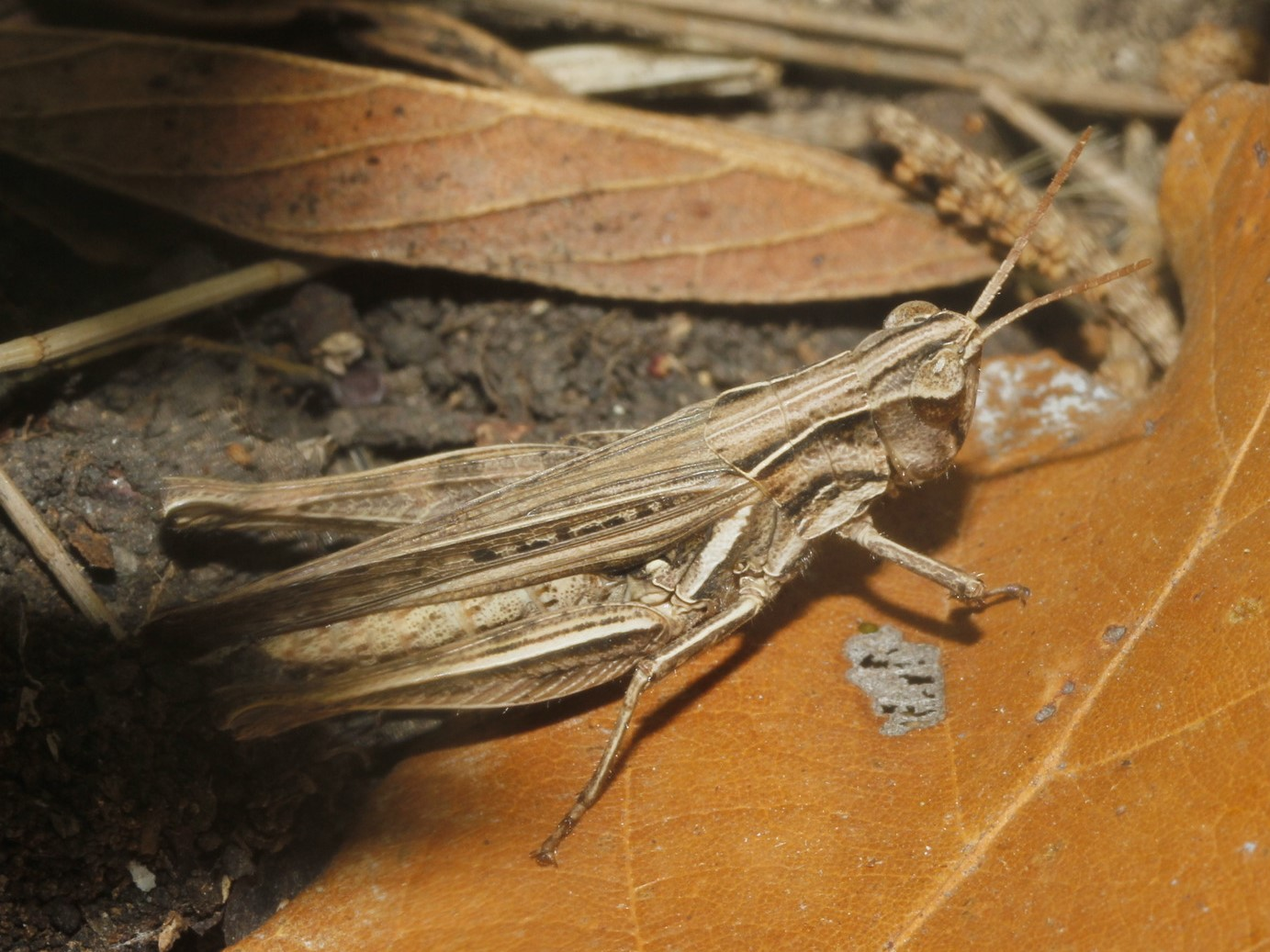
- Orphulella punctata, Mexico

Scientific classification
- Kingdom: Animalia
- Phylum: Arthropoda
- Clade: Pancrustacea
- Class: Insecta
- Order: Orthoptera
- Suborder: Caelifera
- Family: Acrididae
- Subfamily: Gomphocerinae
- Genus: Orphulella
- Species: O. punctata

Binomial name
- Orphulella punctata (De Geer, 1773)

= Orphulella punctata =

Species of grasshopper

Orphulella punctata is a species of slant-faced grasshopper in the family Acrididae. It is found in the Americas.
