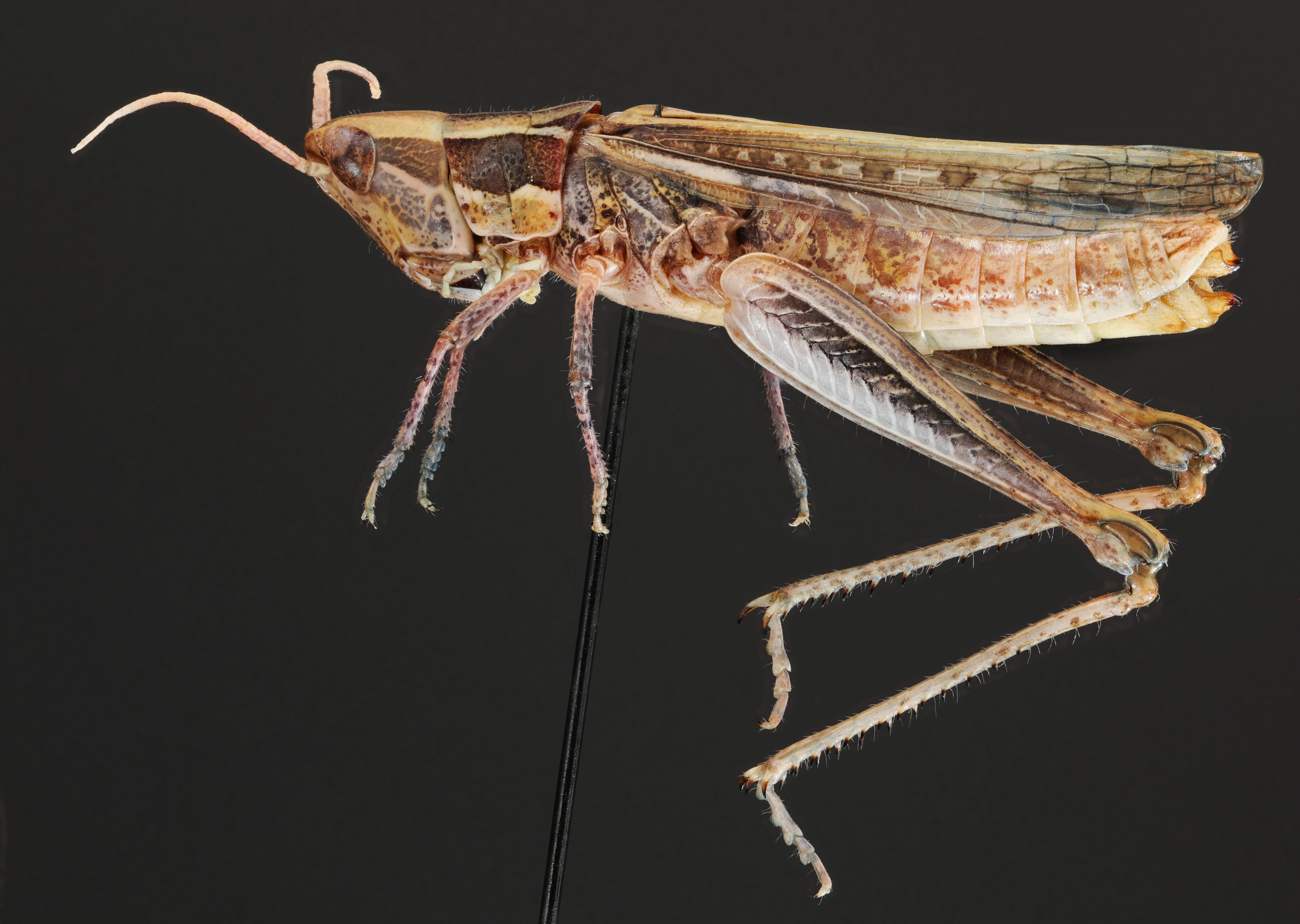
- Cordillacris Grasshopper

Scientific classification
- Kingdom: Animalia
- Phylum: Arthropoda
- Clade: Pancrustacea
- Class: Insecta
- Order: Orthoptera
- Suborder: Caelifera
- Family: Acrididae
- Subfamily: Gomphocerinae
- Genus: Cordillacris; Rehn, 1901

= Cordillacris =

Genus of grasshoppers

Cordillacris is a genus of slant-faced grasshoppers in the family Acrididae. There are at least two described species in Cordillacris.

== Species ==
These two species belong to the genus Cordillacris:

- Cordillacris crenulata (Bruner, 1889) (crenulated grasshopper)
- Cordillacris occipitalis (Thomas, 1873) (spot-winged grasshopper)
