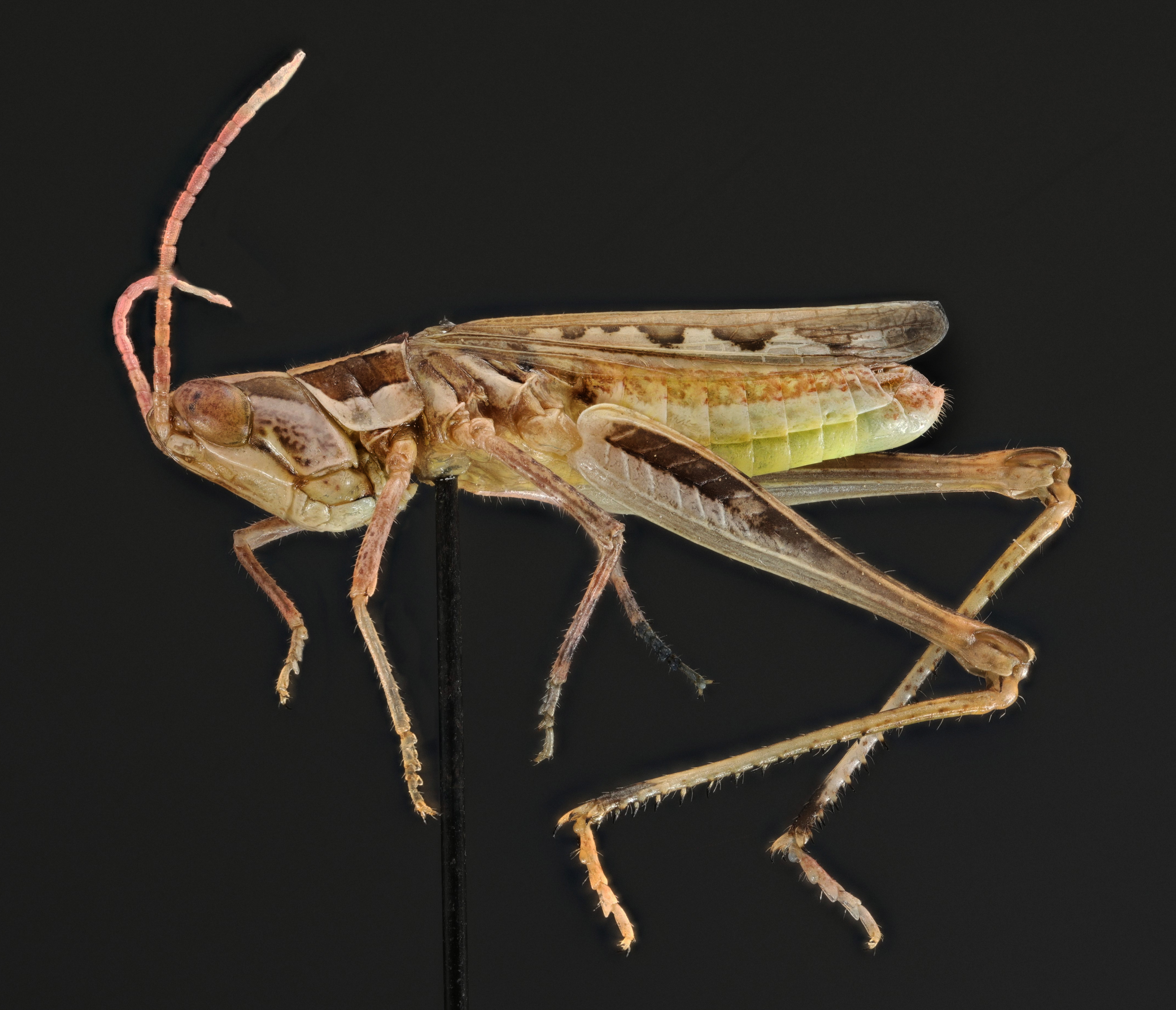

Scientific classification
- Kingdom: Animalia
- Phylum: Arthropoda
- Clade: Pancrustacea
- Class: Insecta
- Order: Orthoptera
- Suborder: Caelifera
- Family: Acrididae
- Genus: Cordillacris
- Species: C. crenulata

Binomial name
- Cordillacris crenulata (Bruner, 1889)

= Cordillacris crenulata =

Species of grasshopper

Cordillacris crenulata, known generally as the crenulated grasshopper or crenulatewinged grasshopper, is a species of slant-faced grasshopper in the family Acrididae. It is found in North America.
