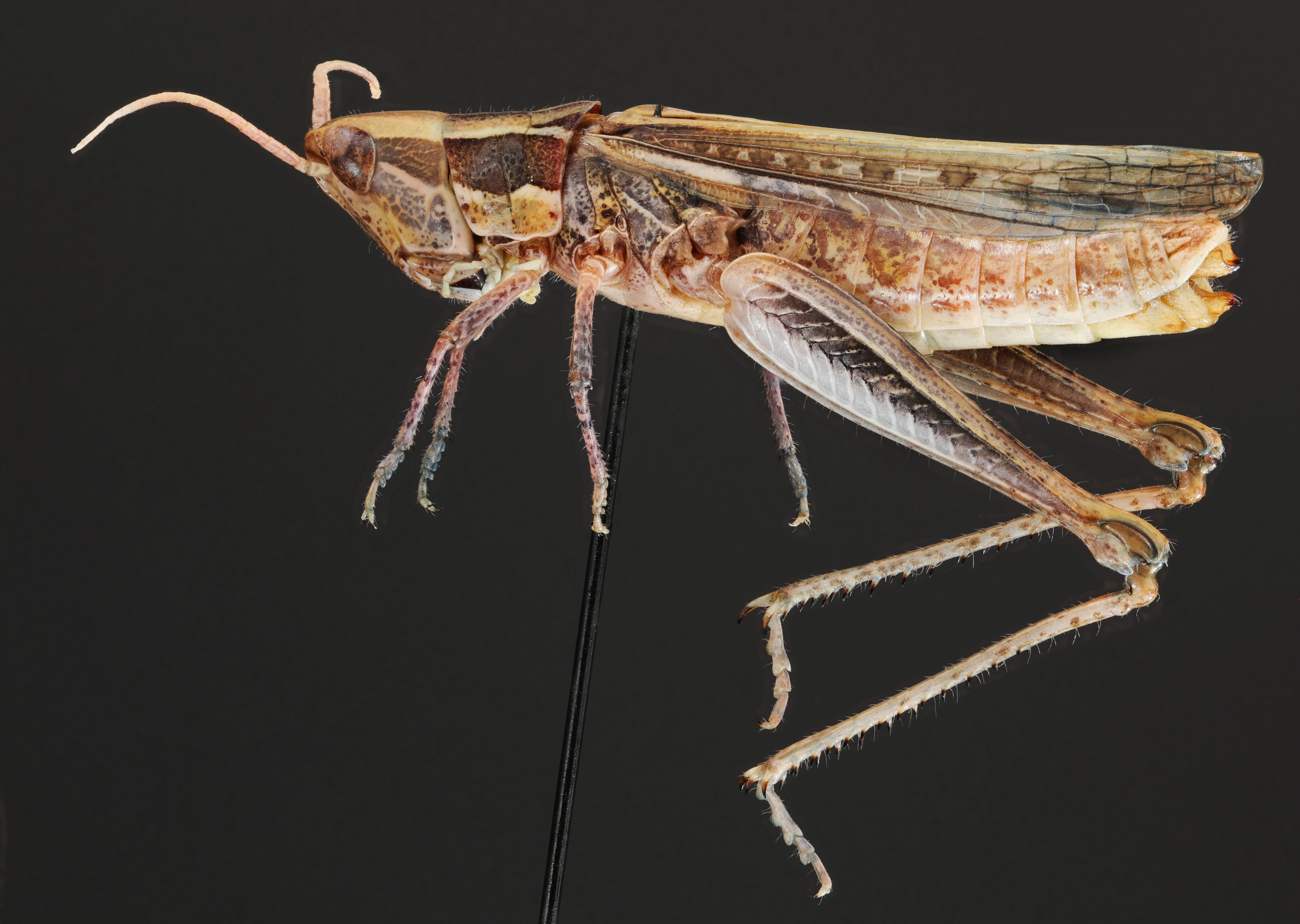

Scientific classification
- Kingdom: Animalia
- Phylum: Arthropoda
- Clade: Pancrustacea
- Class: Insecta
- Order: Orthoptera
- Suborder: Caelifera
- Family: Acrididae
- Genus: Cordillacris
- Species: C. occipitalis

Binomial name
- Cordillacris occipitalis (Thomas, 1873)

= Cordillacris occipitalis =

Species of grasshopper

Cordillacris occipitalis, known generally as the spot-winged grasshopper or spotted wing grasshopper, is a species of slant-faced grasshopper in the family Acrididae. It is found in North America.
