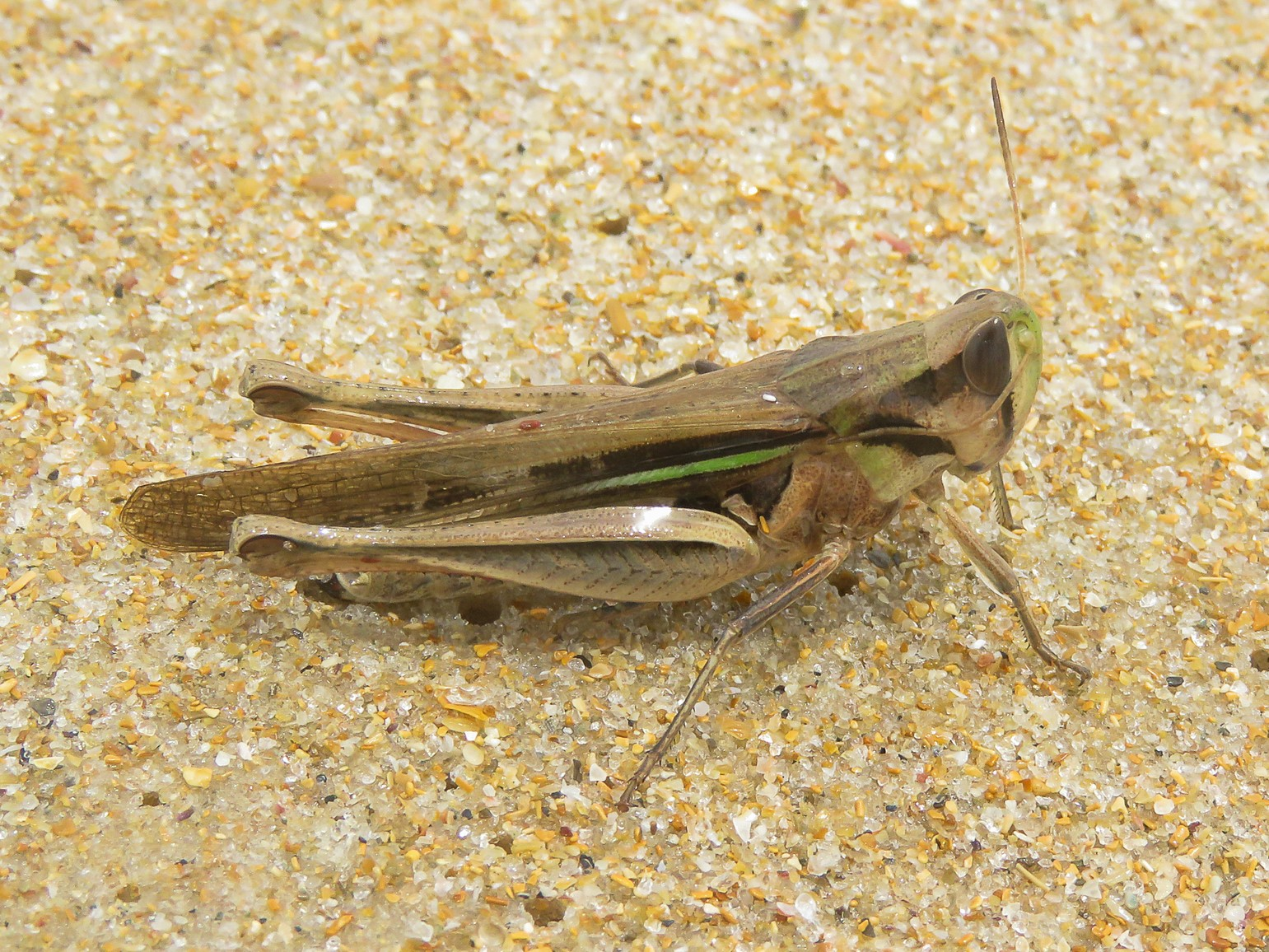
- Rhammatocerus pictus

Scientific classification
- Domain: Eukaryota
- Kingdom: Animalia
- Phylum: Arthropoda
- Class: Insecta
- Order: Orthoptera
- Suborder: Caelifera
- Family: Acrididae
- Subfamily: Gomphocerinae
- Tribe: Scyllinini
- Genus: Rhammatocerus; Saussure, 1861

Synonyms
- Plectrophorus McNeill, 1897; Plectrotettix McNeill, 1897; Pseudostauronotus Brunner von Wattenwyl, 1893; Scyllina Stål, 1873

= Rhammatocerus =

Genus of grasshoppers

Rhammatocerus is a genus of grasshoppers in the subfamily Gomphocerinae and the tribe Scyllinini. There are about 16 described species in Rhammatocerus, including R. schistocercoides, the "Mato Grosso locust".

== Species ==
These 16 species belong to the genus Rhammatocerus:

- Rhammatocerus alticola (Hebard, 1923)
- Rhammatocerus brasiliensis (Bruner, 1904)
- Rhammatocerus brunneri (Giglio-Tos, 1895)
- Rhammatocerus cyanipes (Fabricius, 1775)
- Rhammatocerus guerrai Assis-Pujol, 1997
- Rhammatocerus palustris Carbonell, 1988
- Rhammatocerus peragrans (Stål, 1861)
- Rhammatocerus pictus (Bruner, 1900)
- Rhammatocerus pratensis (Bruner, 1904)
- Rhammatocerus pseudocyanipes Assis-Pujol, 1997
- Rhammatocerus salinus (Bruner, 1904)
- Rhammatocerus schistocercoides (Rehn, 1906)
- Rhammatocerus suffusus (Rehn, 1906)
- Rhammatocerus varipes (Bruner, 1905)
- Rhammatocerus viatorius (Saussure, 1861) (traveller grasshopper)
- Rhammatocerus victori Alves Dos Santos & Assis-Pujol, 2003
