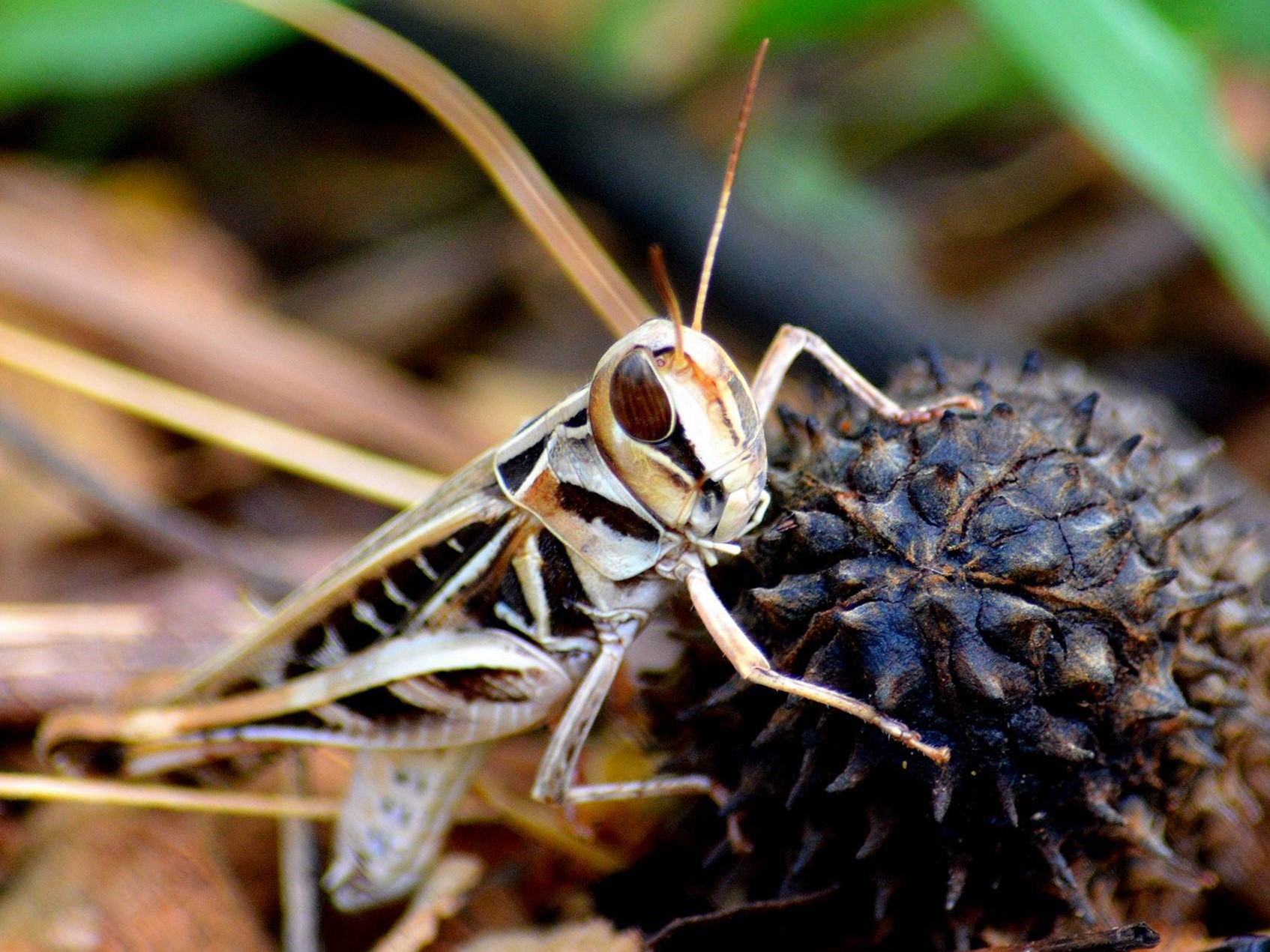

Scientific classification
- Domain: Eukaryota
- Kingdom: Animalia
- Phylum: Arthropoda
- Class: Insecta
- Order: Orthoptera
- Suborder: Caelifera
- Family: Acrididae
- Tribe: Scyllinini
- Genus: Rhammatocerus
- Species: R. viatorius

Binomial name
- Rhammatocerus viatorius (Saussure, 1861)

= Rhammatocerus viatorius =

Species of grasshopper

Rhammatocerus viatorius, the traveller grasshopper, is a species of slant-faced grasshopper in the family Acrididae. It is found in Central America, North America, and Mexico.

== Subspecies ==
These two subspecies belong to the species Rhammatocerus viatorius:

- Rhammatocerus viatorius excelsus (Bruner, 1904)
- Rhammatocerus viatorius viatorius (Saussure, 1861)
