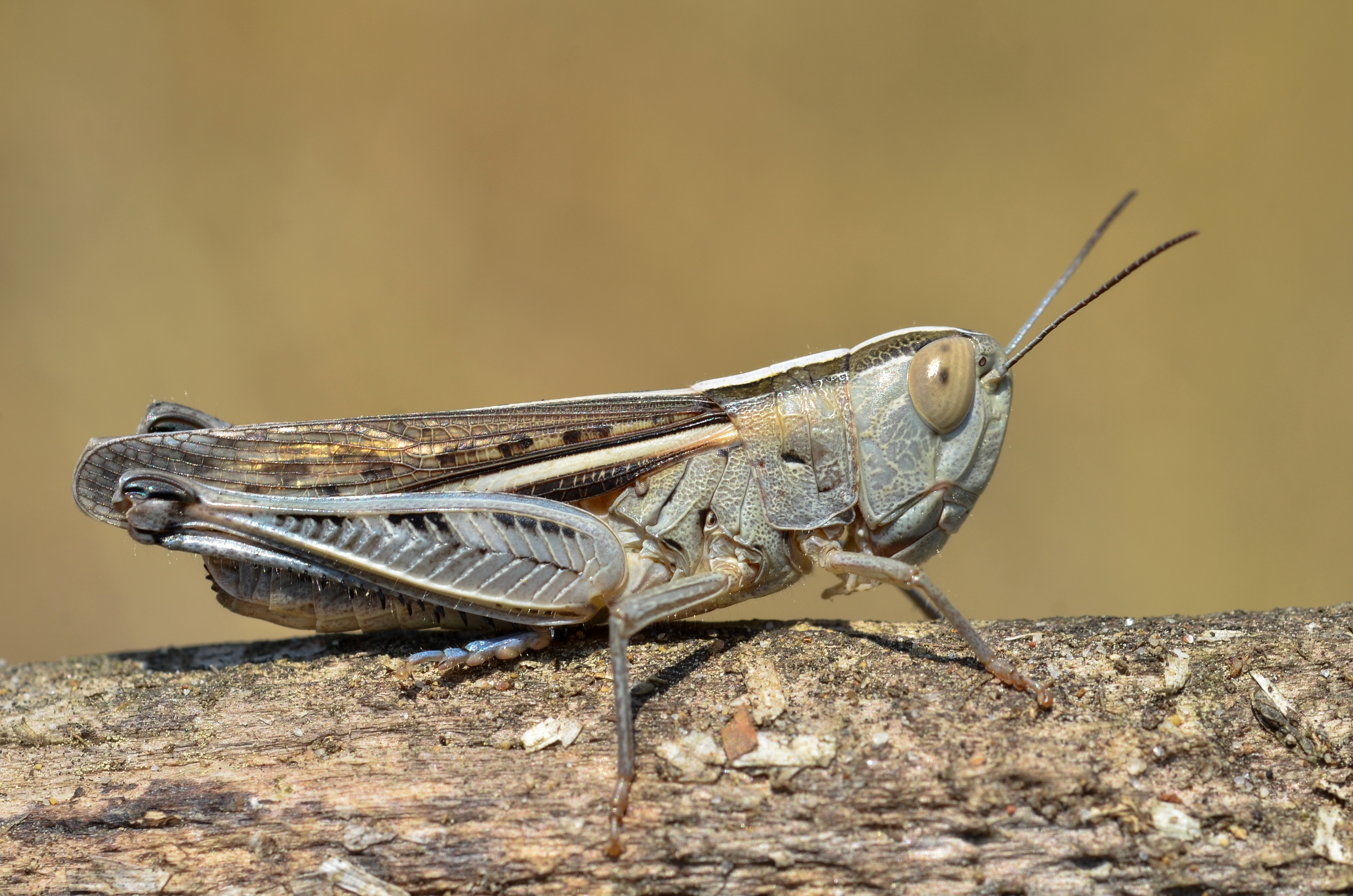
- Ramburiella hispanica, France

Scientific classification
- Kingdom: Animalia
- Phylum: Arthropoda
- Class: Insecta
- Order: Orthoptera
- Suborder: Caelifera
- Family: Acrididae
- Subfamily: Gomphocerinae
- Tribe: Ramburiellini
- Genus: Ramburiella
- Species: R. hispanica

Binomial name
- Ramburiella hispanica (Rambur, 1838)

= Ramburiella hispanica =

Species of grasshopper

Ramburiella hispanica is a species of slant-faced grasshopper in the family Acrididae. It is found in southern Europe and northern Africa.

== Subspecies ==
The Orthoptera Species File lists:

1. R. hispanica hispanica (Rambur, 1838)
2. R. hispanica latipedium Defaut & François, 2021
3. R. hispanica magna Defaut & François, 2021
