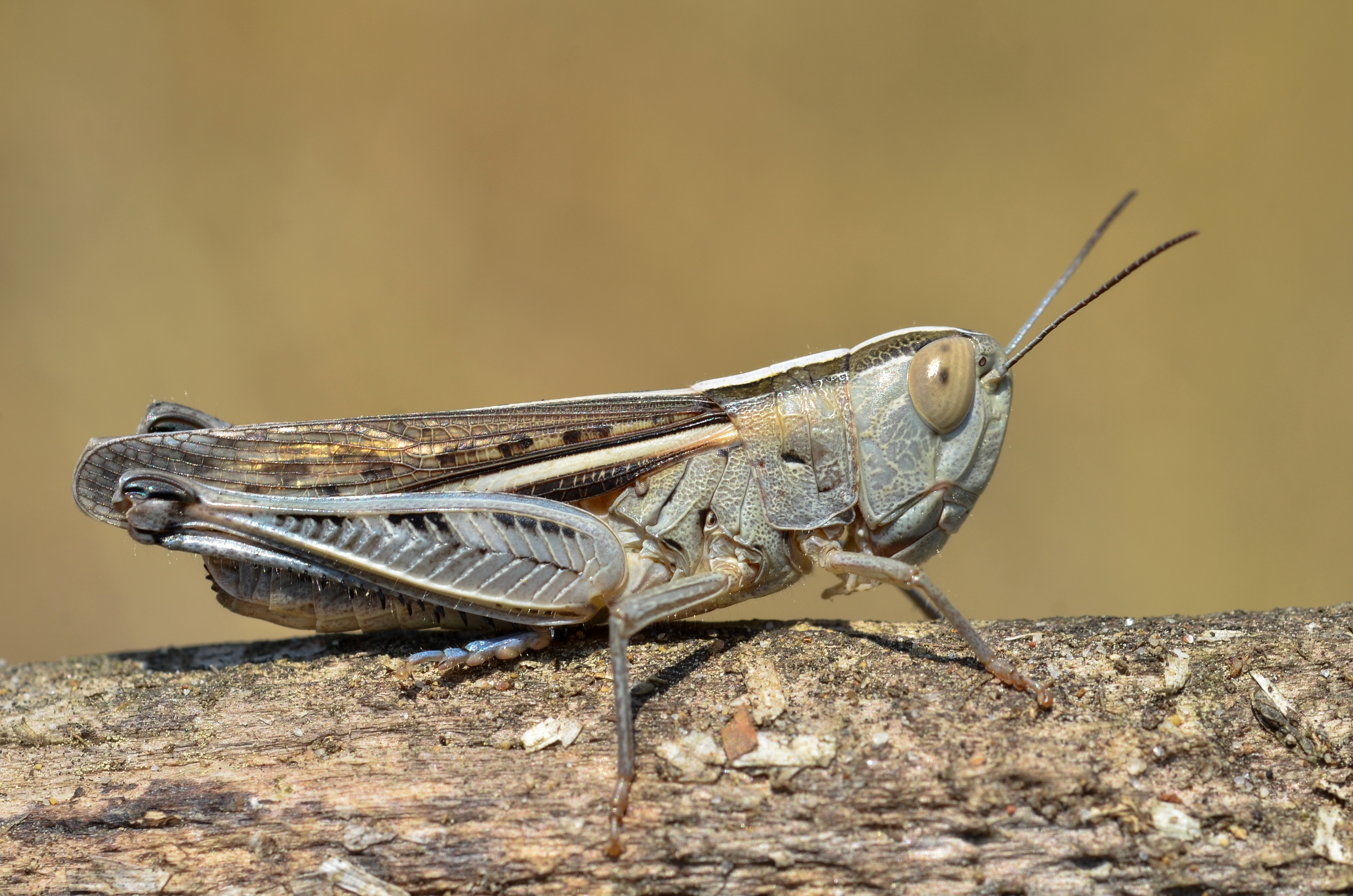
- Ramburiella hispanica, France

Scientific classification
- Domain: Eukaryota
- Kingdom: Animalia
- Phylum: Arthropoda
- Class: Insecta
- Order: Orthoptera
- Suborder: Caelifera
- Family: Acrididae
- Subfamily: Gomphocerinae
- Tribe: Ramburiellini
- Genus: Ramburiella; Bolívar, 1906

= Ramburiella =

Genus of grasshoppers

Ramburiella is a genus of grasshoppers in the family Acrididae and the monotypic tribe Ramburiellini. Species of Ramburiella are found in Africa, Europe, and Asia.

== Species ==
These species belong to the genus Ramburiella:

subgenus Palaeocesa Koçak & Kemal, 2010

(synonym Pallasiella Kirby, 1910)

1. Ramburiella bolivari (Kuthy, 1907)
2. Ramburiella foveolata Tarbinsky, 1931
3. Ramburiella turcomana (Fischer von Waldheim, 1833)

subgenus Ramburiella Bolívar, 1906

1. Ramburiella garambana Dirsh, 1964
2. Ramburiella hispanica (Rambur, 1838) - type species (as Gryllus hispanicus Rambur)
3. Ramburiella signata (Fischer von Waldheim, 1833)
