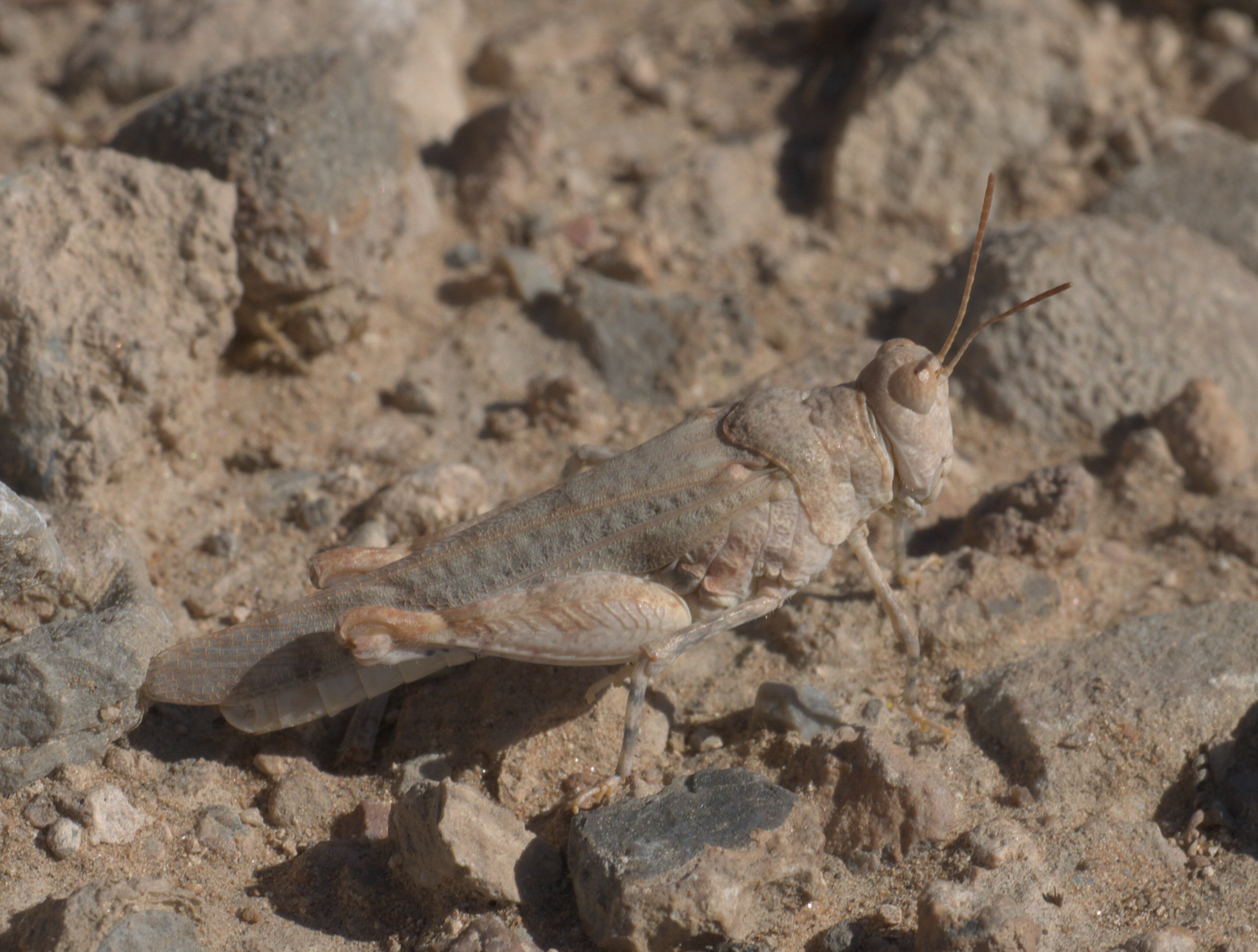
- Cibolacris parviceps

Scientific classification
- Domain: Eukaryota
- Kingdom: Animalia
- Phylum: Arthropoda
- Class: Insecta
- Order: Orthoptera
- Suborder: Caelifera
- Family: Acrididae
- Subfamily: Gomphocerinae
- Genus: Cibolacris; Hebard, 1937

= Cibolacris =

Genus of grasshoppers

Cibolacris is a genus of slant-faced grasshoppers in the family Acrididae. There are at least four described species in Cibolacris.

== Species ==
These four species belong to the genus Cibolacris:

- Cibolacris crypticus (Vickery, 1969)
- Cibolacris parviceps (F. Walker, 1870) (cream grasshopper)
- Cibolacris samalayucae Tinkham, 1961 (samalayuca dune grasshopper)
- Cibolacris weissmani Otte, 1981
