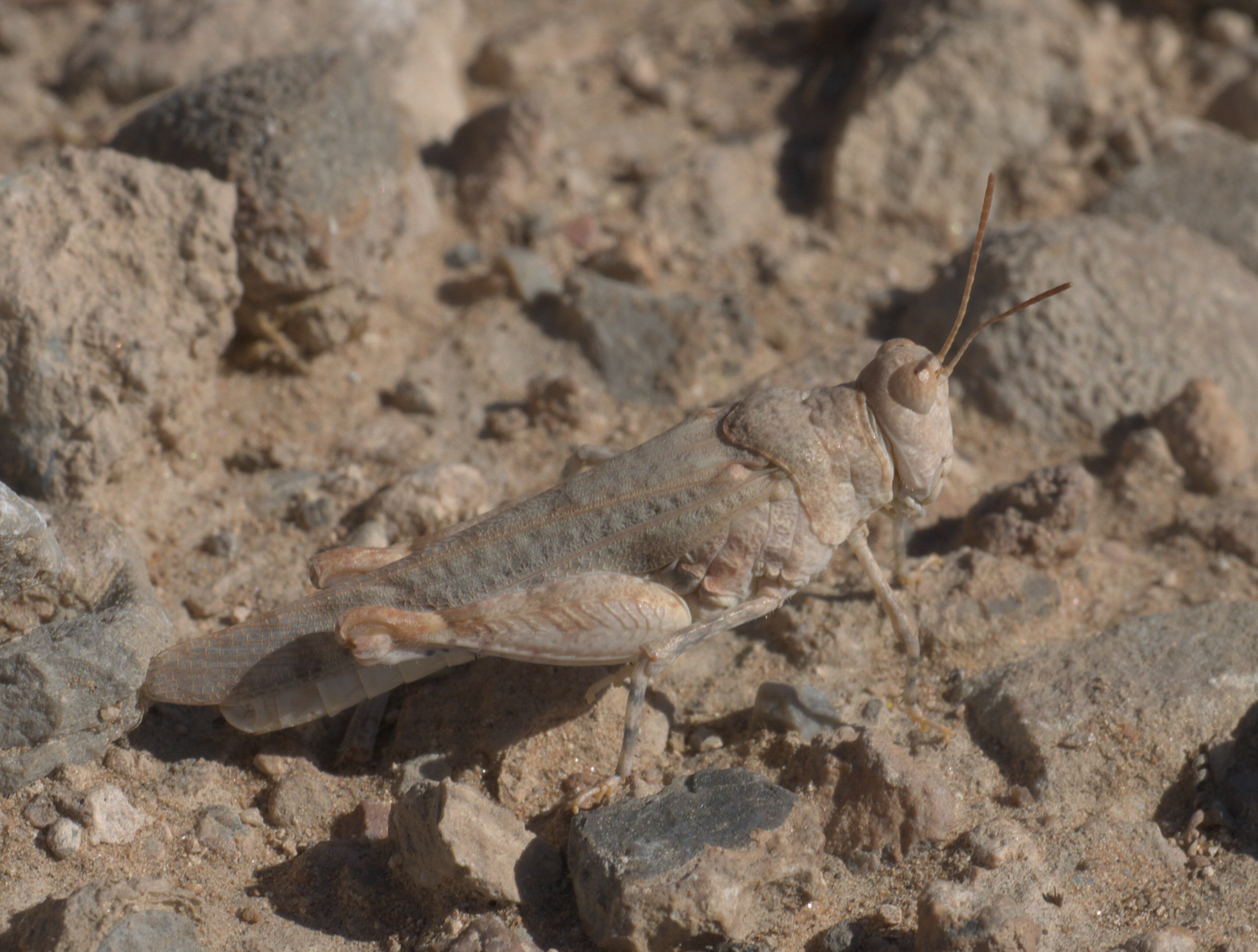

Scientific classification
- Kingdom: Animalia
- Phylum: Arthropoda
- Class: Insecta
- Order: Orthoptera
- Suborder: Caelifera
- Family: Acrididae
- Subfamily: Gomphocerinae
- Genus: Cibolacris
- Species: C. parviceps

Binomial name
- Cibolacris parviceps (Walker, 1870)

= Cibolacris parviceps =

Species of grasshopper

Cibolacris parviceps, the cream grasshopper, is a species of slant-faced grasshopper in the family Acrididae. It is found in Central America and North America.
