= Cibolacris samalayucae =

Scientific classification
- Domain: Eukaryota
- Kingdom: Animalia
- Phylum: Arthropoda
- Class: Insecta
- Order: Orthoptera
- Suborder: Caelifera
- Family: Acrididae
- Subfamily: Gomphocerinae
- Genus: Cibolacris
- Species: C. samalayucae

Binomial name
- Cibolacris samalayucae Tinkham, 1961

Species of grasshopper

Cibolacris samalayucae, the samalayuca dune grasshopper, is a species of slant-faced grasshopper in the family Acrididae. It is found in Central America, North America, and Mexico.
