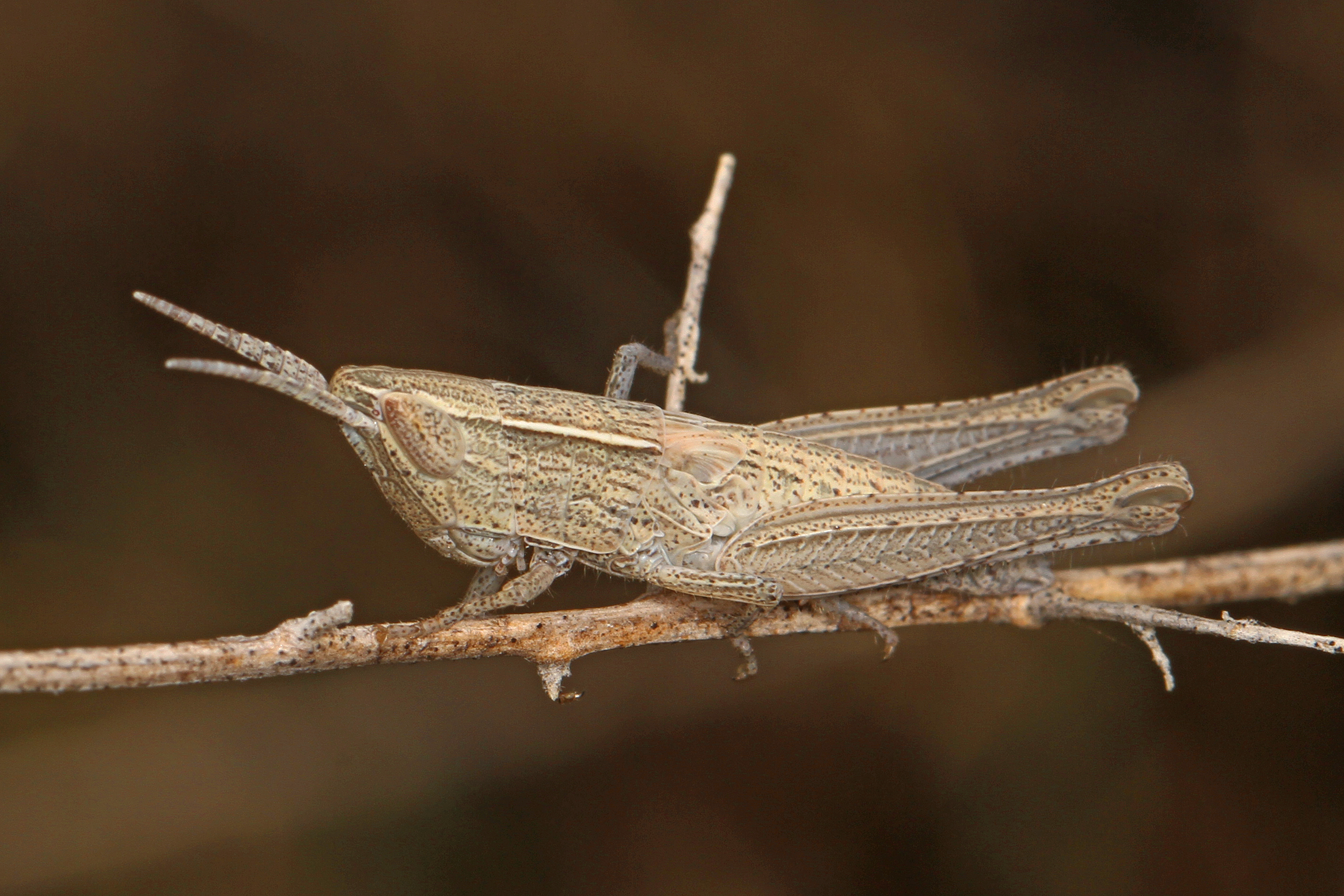
- Opeia obscura

Scientific classification
- Domain: Eukaryota
- Kingdom: Animalia
- Phylum: Arthropoda
- Class: Insecta
- Order: Orthoptera
- Suborder: Caelifera
- Family: Acrididae
- Subfamily: Gomphocerinae
- Tribe: Eritettigini
- Genus: Opeia; McNeill, 1897

= Opeia =

Genus of grasshoppers

Opeia is a genus of slant-faced grasshoppers in the family Acrididae. There are at least two described species in Opeia.

== Species ==
These two species belong to the genus Opeia:

- Opeia atascosa Hebard, 1937 (atascosa grasshopper)
- Opeia obscura (Thomas, 1872) (obscure grasshopper)
