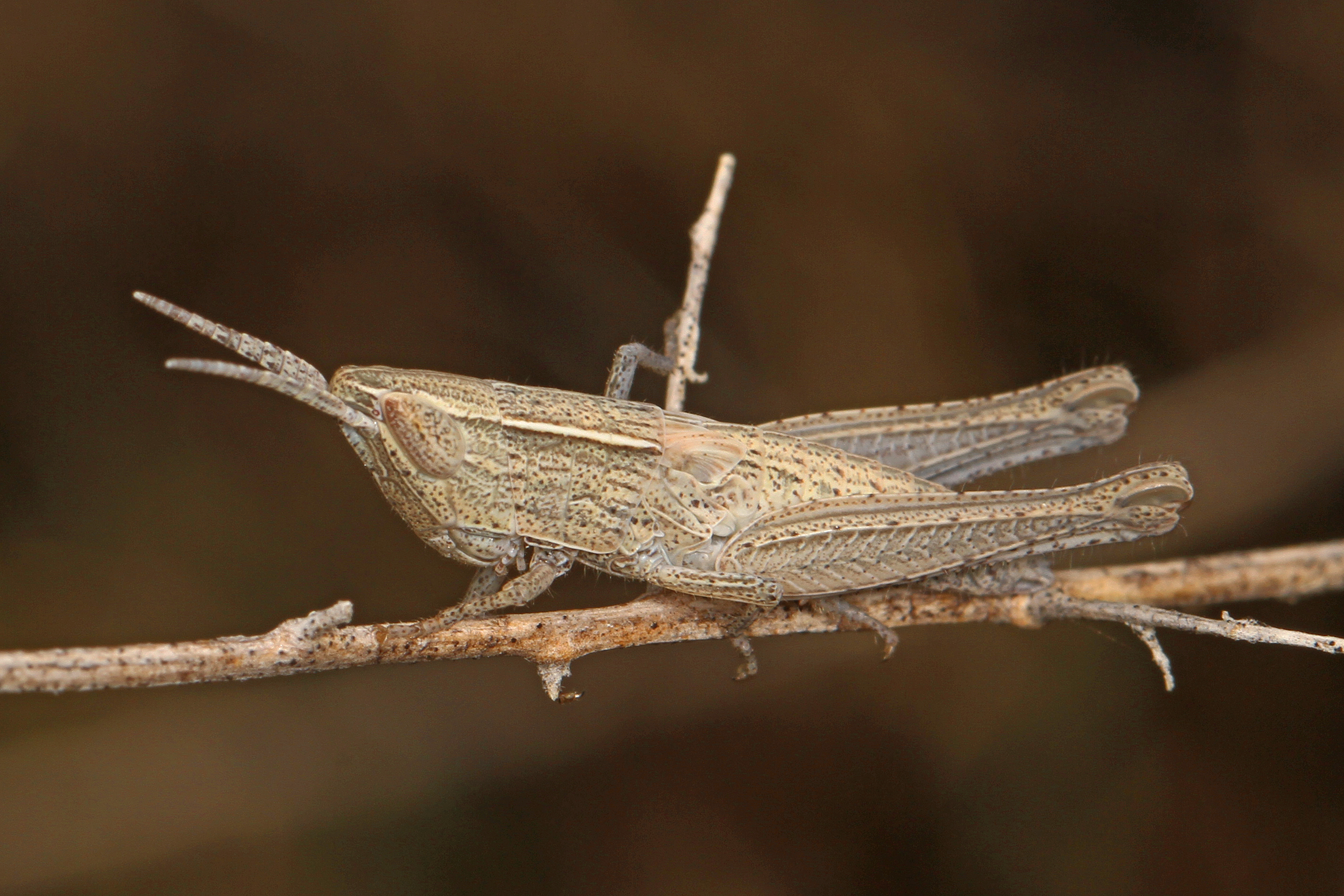

Scientific classification
- Domain: Eukaryota
- Kingdom: Animalia
- Phylum: Arthropoda
- Class: Insecta
- Order: Orthoptera
- Suborder: Caelifera
- Family: Acrididae
- Tribe: Eritettigini
- Genus: Opeia
- Species: O. obscura

Binomial name
- Opeia obscura (Thomas, 1872)

= Opeia obscura =

Species of grasshopper

Opeia obscura, the obscure grasshopper, is a species of slant-faced grasshopper in the family Acrididae. It is found in Central America and North America.
