= Opeia atascosa =

Scientific classification
- Domain: Eukaryota
- Kingdom: Animalia
- Phylum: Arthropoda
- Class: Insecta
- Order: Orthoptera
- Suborder: Caelifera
- Family: Acrididae
- Tribe: Eritettigini
- Genus: Opeia
- Species: O. atascosa

Binomial name
- Opeia atascosa Hebard, 1937

Species of grasshopper

Opeia atascosa, the atascosa grasshopper, is a species of slant-faced grasshopper in the family Acrididae. It is found in Central America and North America.
