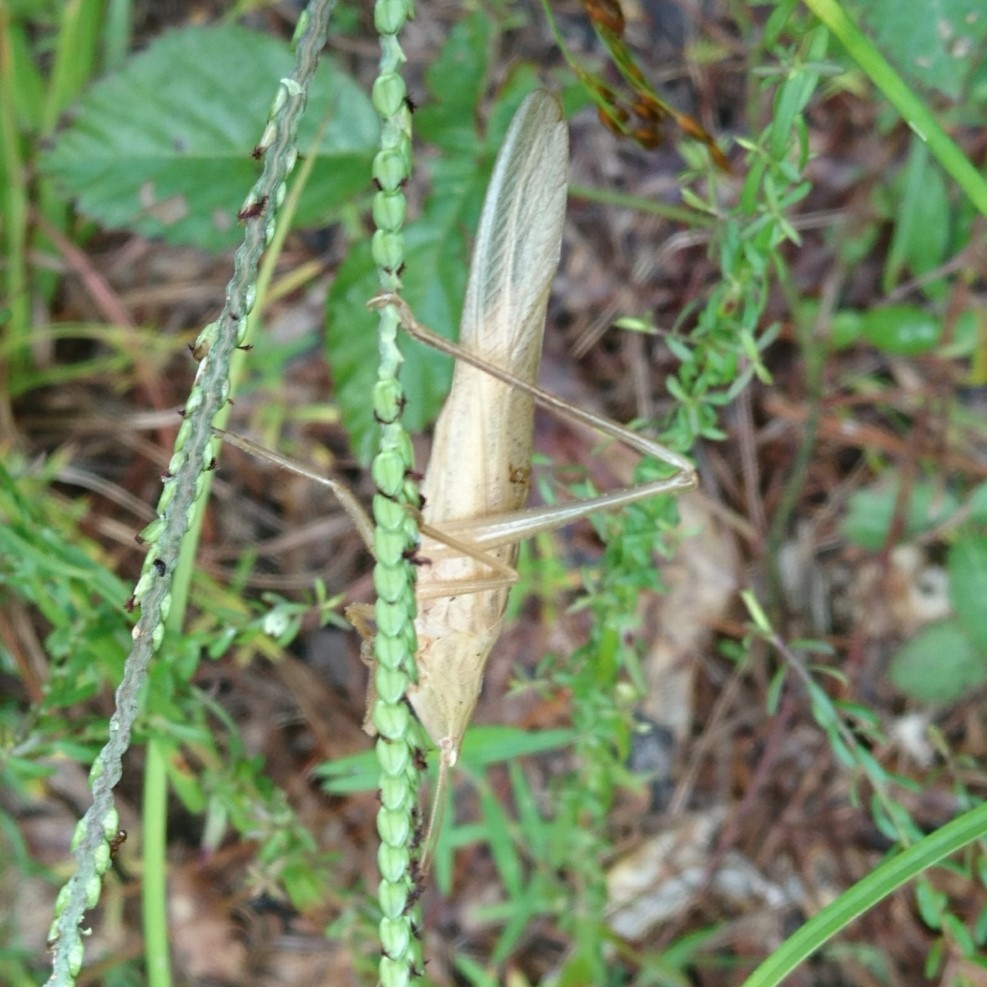

Scientific classification
- Domain: Eukaryota
- Kingdom: Animalia
- Phylum: Arthropoda
- Class: Insecta
- Order: Orthoptera
- Suborder: Ensifera
- Family: Tettigoniidae
- Genus: Neoconocephalus
- Species: N. velox

Binomial name
- Neoconocephalus velox Rehn & Hebard, 1914

= Neoconocephalus velox =

Species of cricket-like animal

Neoconocephalus velox, the swift conehead, is a species of conehead bush cricket in the family Tettigoniidae. It is found in North America.
