= Neoconocephalus bivocatus =

Scientific classification
- Domain: Eukaryota
- Kingdom: Animalia
- Phylum: Arthropoda
- Class: Insecta
- Order: Orthoptera
- Suborder: Ensifera
- Family: Tettigoniidae
- Tribe: Copiphorini
- Genus: Neoconocephalus
- Species: N. bivocatus

Binomial name
- Neoconocephalus bivocatus Walker, Whitesell & Alexander, 1973

Species of cricket-like animal

Neoconocephalus bivocatus, the false robust conehead, is a species of conehead in the family Tettigoniidae. It is found in North America.
