= R. baileyi =

R. baileyi

- Rhododendron baileyi, a species of Rhododendron
- Ruspolia baileyi, the Nsenene, a species of grasshopper
- Rotalina baileyi, a species of algae in the chromista
