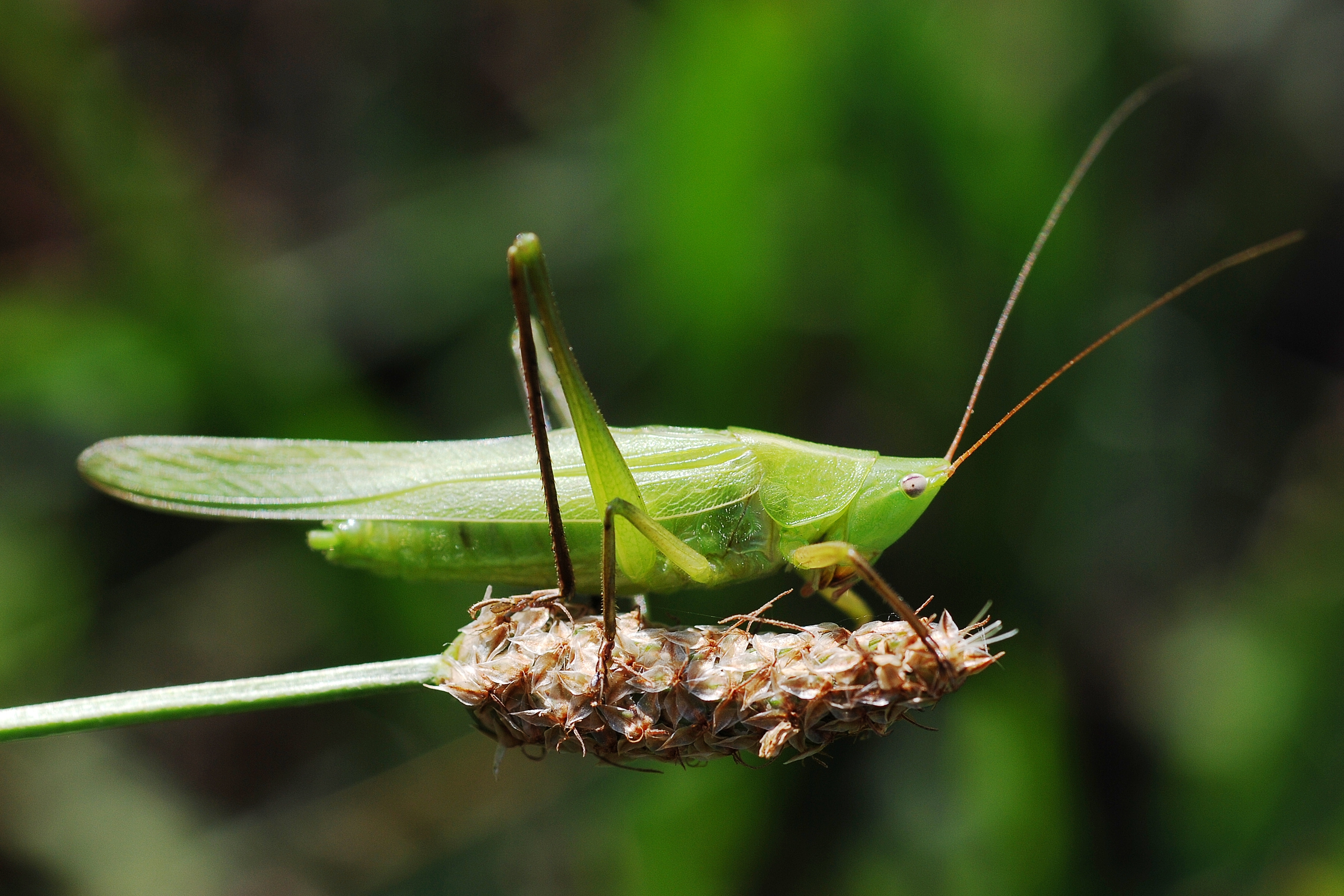
- Nsenene look-alike (Ruspolia nitidula)

Scientific classification
- Kingdom: Animalia
- Phylum: Arthropoda
- Clade: Pancrustacea
- Class: Insecta
- Order: Orthoptera
- Suborder: Ensifera
- Family: Tettigoniidae
- Genus: Ruspolia
- Species: R. differens

Binomial name
- Ruspolia differens (Serville, 1838)

Synonyms
- Conocephalus albidonervis Redtenbacher, 1891; Conocephalus exiguus Stål, 1876; Conocephalus lemus Redtenbacher, 1891; Conocephalus longipennis Redtenbacher, 1891; Conocephalus vicinus Walker, 1869; Conocephalus (Homorocoryphus) melanostictus Karny, 1907; Homorocoryphus mediotessellatus Karny, 1917

= Nsenene =

Species of cricket-like animal

Nsenene is the Luganda name for Ruspolia differens: a bush cricket (a.k.a. katydids or misnamed "long-horned grasshoppers") in the tribe Copiphorini of the 'cone-head' subfamily. It is often confused with the closely related Ruspolia nitidula.

== Distribution and traditional beliefs ==
Nsenene (Known also as "Senene"). This seasonal delicacy has long been known as one of the many totems of Buganda Kingdom of Uganda. This species is a delicacy in central and south-western Uganda. The insect is also found in South Africa, Malawi, Ivory Coast, Congo, Ghana, Kenya, Burundi, Cameroon, Rwanda, Tanzania, Zimbabwe, Zambia, Madagascar, and Mauritius. In Uganda, they are particularly associated with the central and southwestern regions, such as Buganda and parts of Masaka. The species emerges in swarms during wet seasons, typically around May and November, and has become a highly anticipated seasonal item. In Ugandan cultural contexts, nsenene have significant traditional and social associations. Among the Baganda people of the Buganda kingdom, nsenene have historically been treated as a cultural delicacy and, in some accounts, formed part of customary practices around relationships and social exchange. Traditionally, women and children participated in collecting nsenene during peak seasons, and the insects were offered to men as part of courtship or spousal gift-giving practices.

Historically, some local beliefs discouraged women from consuming nsenene, with customs suggesting that women who ate the grasshoppers might suffer negative consequences such as bearing children with unusual traits. Such beliefs have gradually diminished with the modern social change, and nsenene today are consumed by men and women of all ages in regions where the insects are eaten.

Beyond Uganda, nsenene also hold cultural significance in neighboring countries. Among the Haya people of Tanzania, for example, edible grasshoppers are traditionally offered as signs of respect and hospitality, and are widely consumed across communities. In these contexts, insect consumption is not only a food practice but tied to traditional knowledge about nutrition and community values.

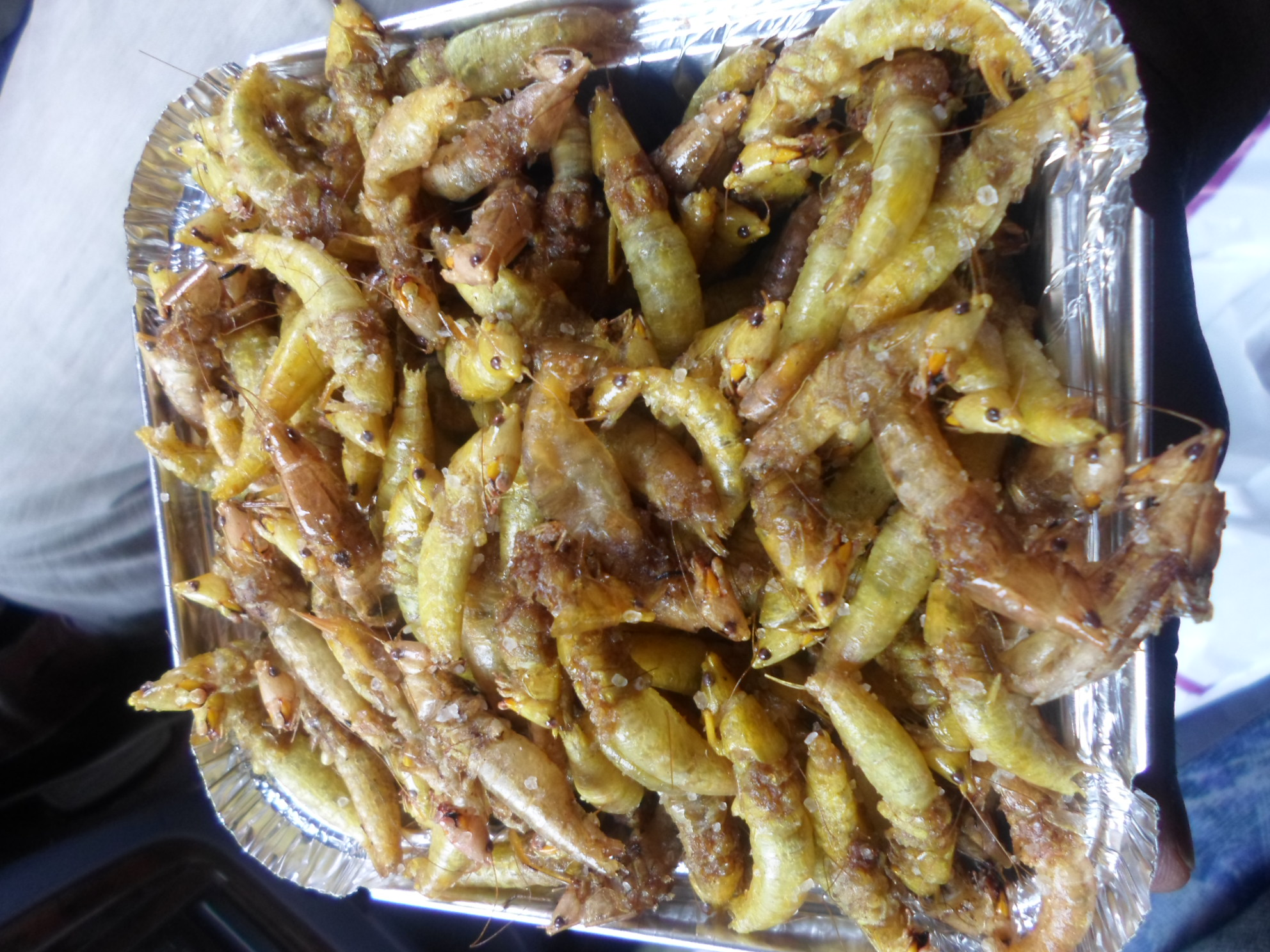
Cooked Nsenene
