= Belocephalus davisi =

Scientific classification
- Domain: Eukaryota
- Kingdom: Animalia
- Phylum: Arthropoda
- Class: Insecta
- Order: Orthoptera
- Suborder: Ensifera
- Family: Tettigoniidae
- Tribe: Copiphorini
- Genus: Belocephalus
- Species: B. davisi

Binomial name
- Belocephalus davisi Rehn & Hebard, 1916

Species of cricket-like animal

Belocephalus davisi, or Davis's conehead, is a species of conehead in the family Tettigoniidae. It is found in North America.
