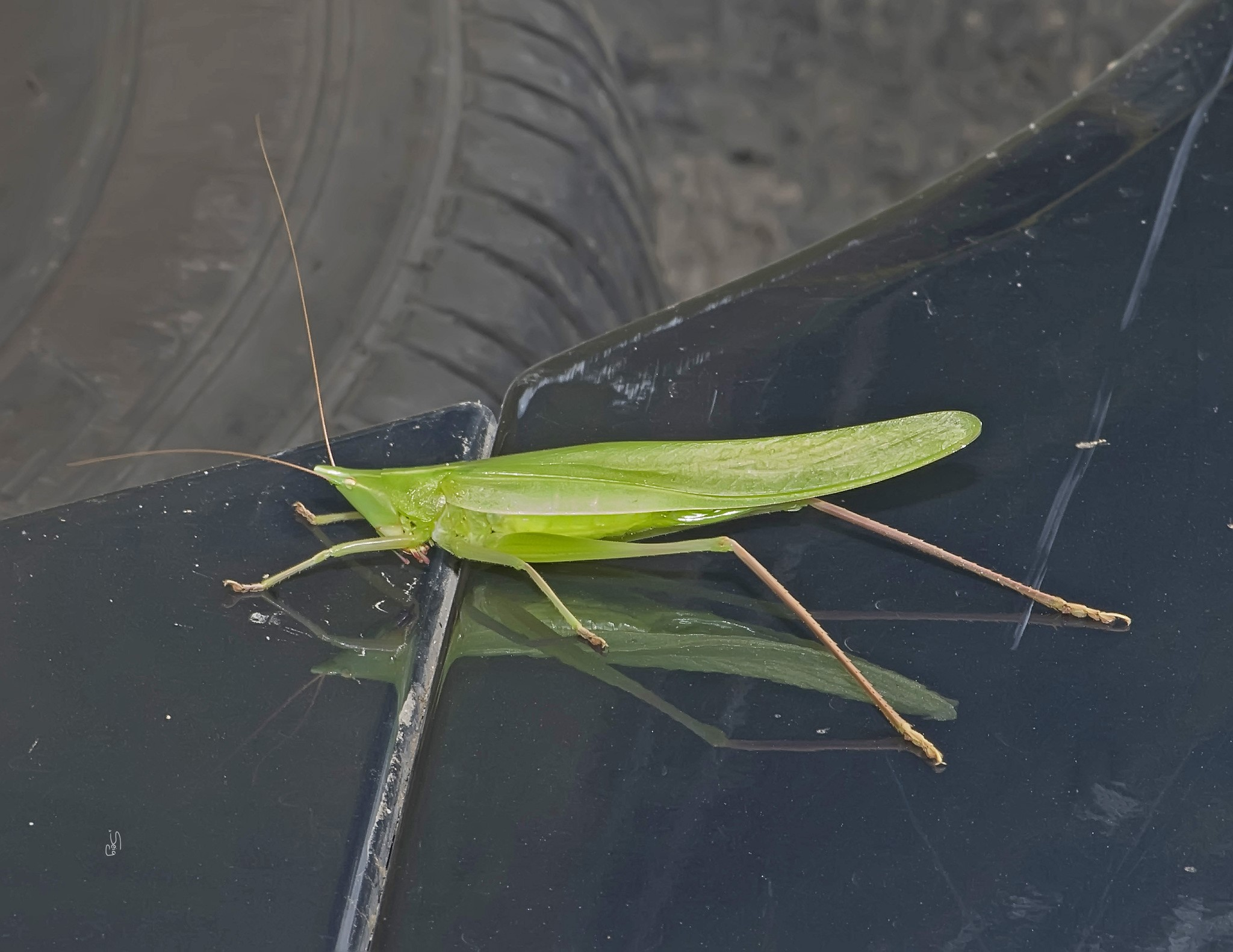

Scientific classification
- Kingdom: Animalia
- Phylum: Arthropoda
- Class: Insecta
- Order: Orthoptera
- Suborder: Ensifera
- Family: Tettigoniidae
- Tribe: Copiphorini
- Genus: Neoconocephalus
- Species: N. palustris

Binomial name
- Neoconocephalus palustris (Blatchley, 1893)

= Neoconocephalus palustris =

Species of cricket-like animal

Neoconocephalus palustris, the marsh conehead, is a species of conehead in the family Tettigoniidae. It is found in North America.
