= Neoconocephalus exiliscanorus =

Scientific classification
- Domain: Eukaryota
- Kingdom: Animalia
- Phylum: Arthropoda
- Class: Insecta
- Order: Orthoptera
- Suborder: Ensifera
- Family: Tettigoniidae
- Tribe: Copiphorini
- Genus: Neoconocephalus
- Species: N. exiliscanorus

Binomial name
- Neoconocephalus exiliscanorus (Davis, 1887)

Species of cricket-like animal

Neoconocephalus exiliscanorus, the slightly musical conehead, is a species of conehead in the family Tettigoniidae. It is found in North America.
