= Neoconocephalus robustus =

Scientific classification
- Domain: Eukaryota
- Kingdom: Animalia
- Phylum: Arthropoda
- Class: Insecta
- Order: Orthoptera
- Suborder: Ensifera
- Family: Tettigoniidae
- Tribe: Copiphorini
- Genus: Neoconocephalus
- Species: N. robustus

Binomial name
- Neoconocephalus robustus (Scudder, 1863)

Species of cricket-like animal

Neoconocephalus robustus, known generally as the robust conehead or crepitating conehead, is a species of conehead in the family Tettigoniidae. It is found in North America. The song of this insect has an incredible volume of 116 decibels. The peak frequency of the song is 8 kilohertz and the sound can be heard from 500 meters away, even in a driving car with closed windows. From a distance, the song has a whining quality but at close range, it becomes painful to listen to.
