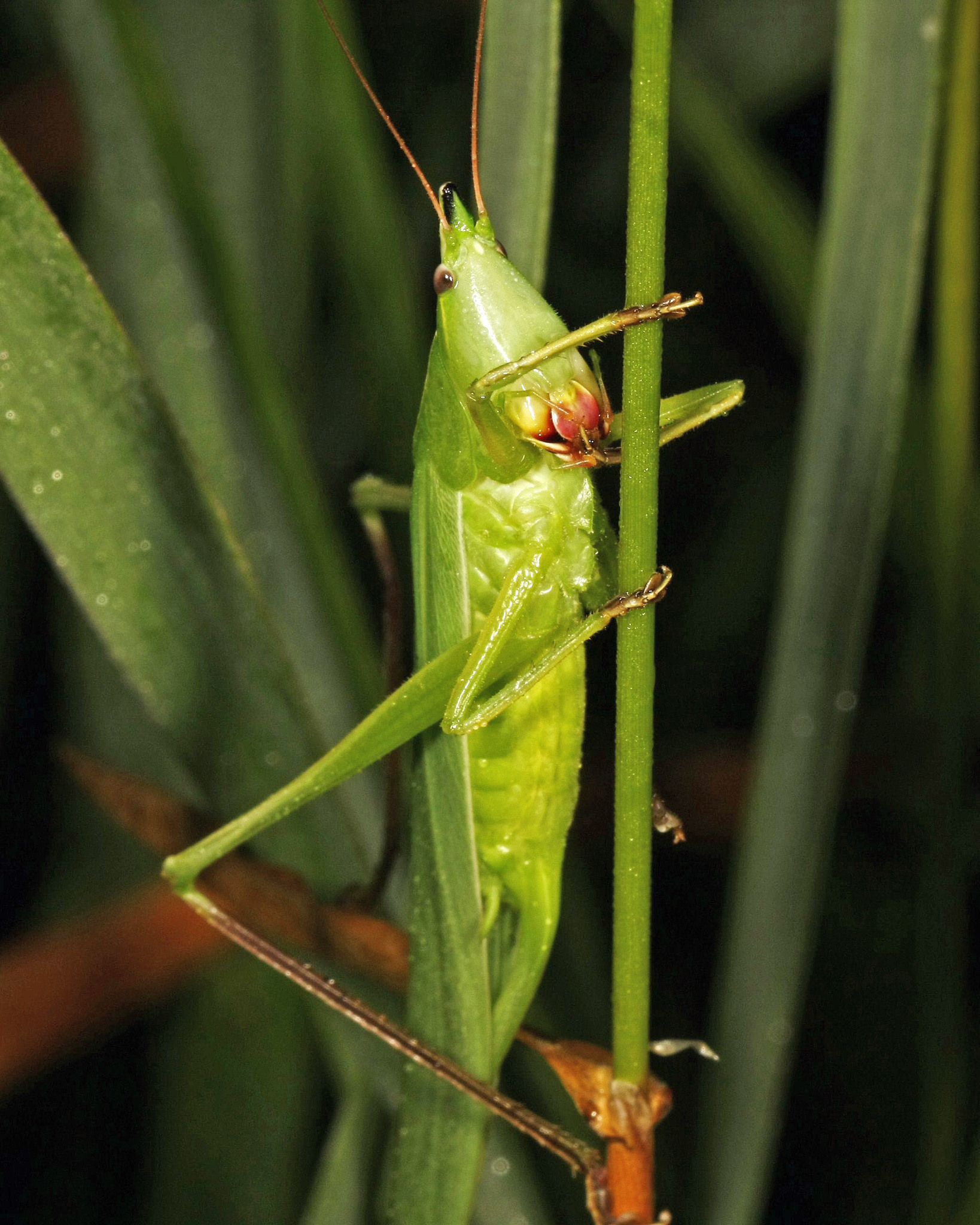

Scientific classification
- Domain: Eukaryota
- Kingdom: Animalia
- Phylum: Arthropoda
- Class: Insecta
- Order: Orthoptera
- Suborder: Ensifera
- Family: Tettigoniidae
- Genus: Neoconocephalus
- Species: N. ensiger

Binomial name
- Neoconocephalus ensiger (Harris, 1841)

= Neoconocephalus ensiger =

Species of cricket-like animal

Neoconocephalus ensiger, known generally as the sword-bearing conehead or swordbearer, is a species of conehead in the family Tettigoniidae. It is found in North America.
