= Neoconocephalus caudellianus =

Scientific classification
- Domain: Eukaryota
- Kingdom: Animalia
- Phylum: Arthropoda
- Class: Insecta
- Order: Orthoptera
- Suborder: Ensifera
- Family: Tettigoniidae
- Tribe: Copiphorini
- Genus: Neoconocephalus
- Species: N. caudellianus

Binomial name
- Neoconocephalus caudellianus (Davis, 1905)

Species of cricket-like animal

Neoconocephalus caudellianus, or Caudell's conehead, is a species of conehead in the family Tettigoniidae. It is found in North America.
