= Neoconocephalus melanorhinus =

Scientific classification
- Domain: Eukaryota
- Kingdom: Animalia
- Phylum: Arthropoda
- Class: Insecta
- Order: Orthoptera
- Suborder: Ensifera
- Family: Tettigoniidae
- Genus: Neoconocephalus
- Species: N. melanorhinus

Binomial name
- Neoconocephalus melanorhinus (Rehn & Hebard, 1907)

Species of cricket-like animal

Neoconocephalus melanorhinus, the black-nosed conehead, is a species of conehead in the family Tettigoniidae. It is found in North America.
