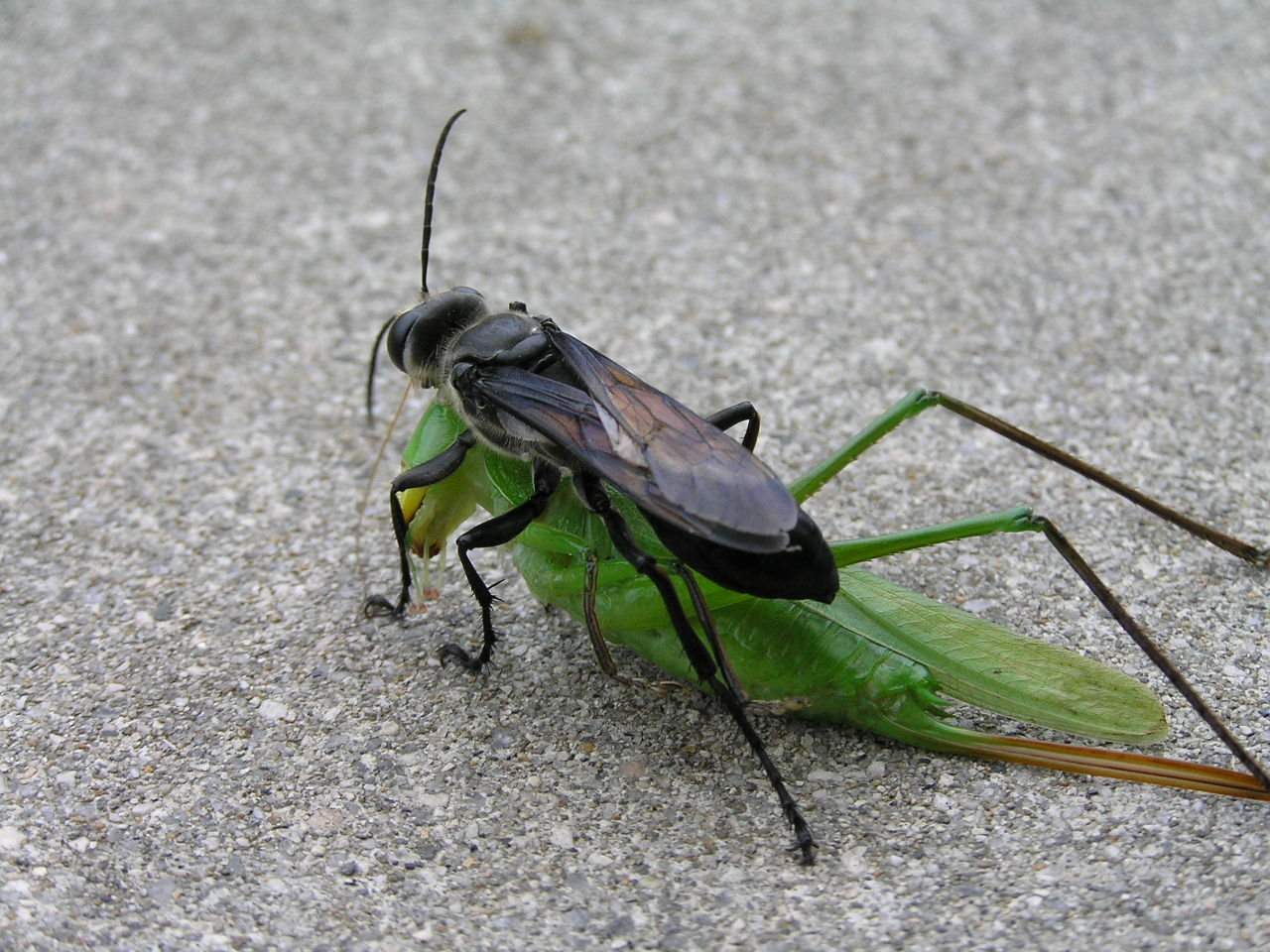
- R. lineosa parasitised by the wasp Sphex argentatus
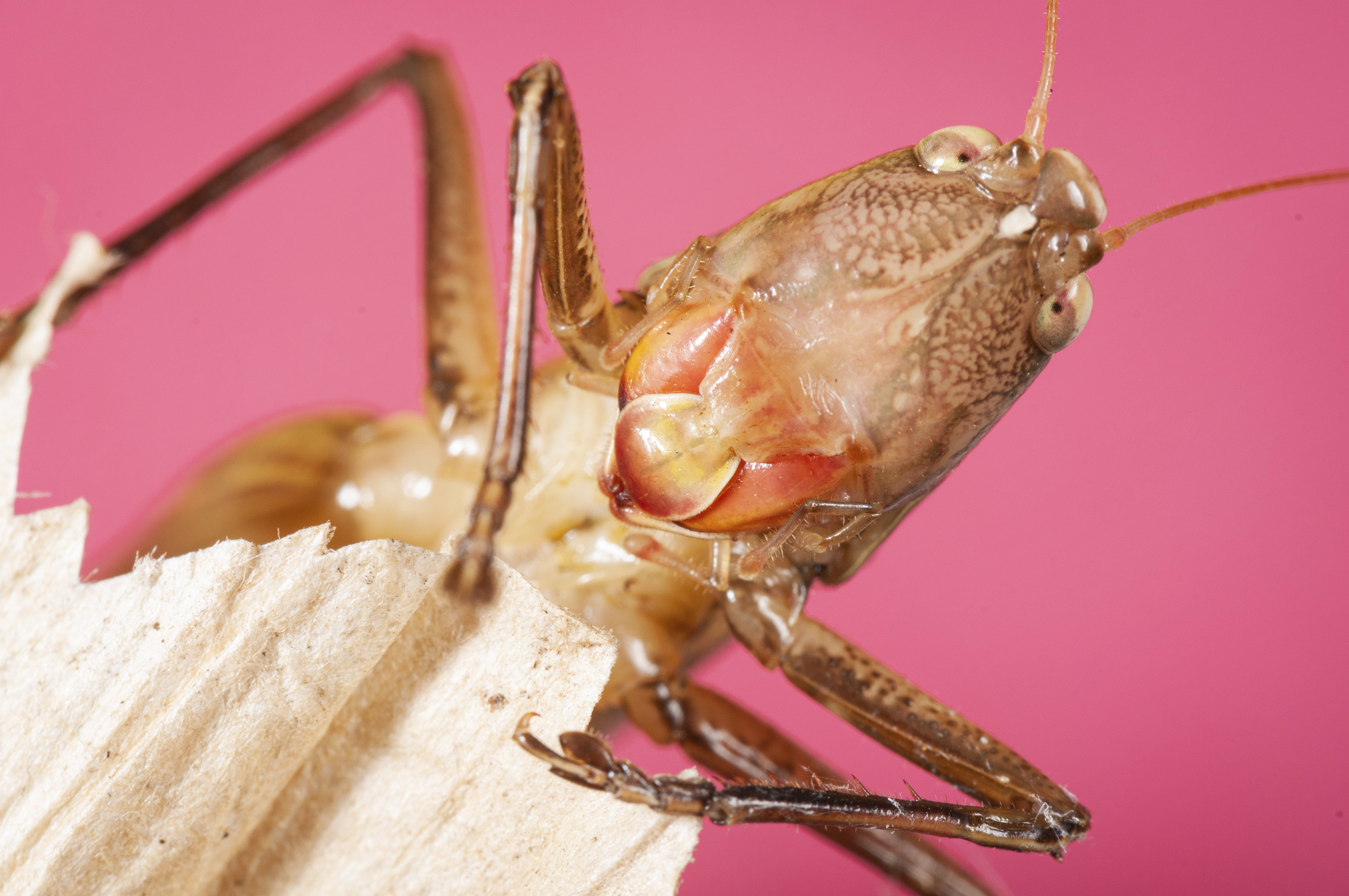
- Ruspolia lineosa, Adult, Korea

Scientific classification
- Kingdom: Animalia
- Phylum: Arthropoda
- Clade: Pancrustacea
- Class: Insecta
- Order: Orthoptera
- Suborder: Ensifera
- Family: Tettigoniidae
- Subfamily: Conocephalinae
- Tribe: Copiphorini
- Genus: Ruspolia
- Species: R. lineosa

Binomial name
- Ruspolia lineosa (Walker, 1869)

Synonyms
- Conocephalus fuscipes (Redtenbacher, 1891); Conocephalus latipennis (Walker, 1869)

= Ruspolia lineosa =

Species of cricket-like animal

Ruspolia lineosa is an insect which belongs to the family Tettigoniidae (bush crickets or katydids) and found in eastern Asia (Sri Lanka, Indo-China to Japan). The scientific name of this species was first published by Walker in 1869.
