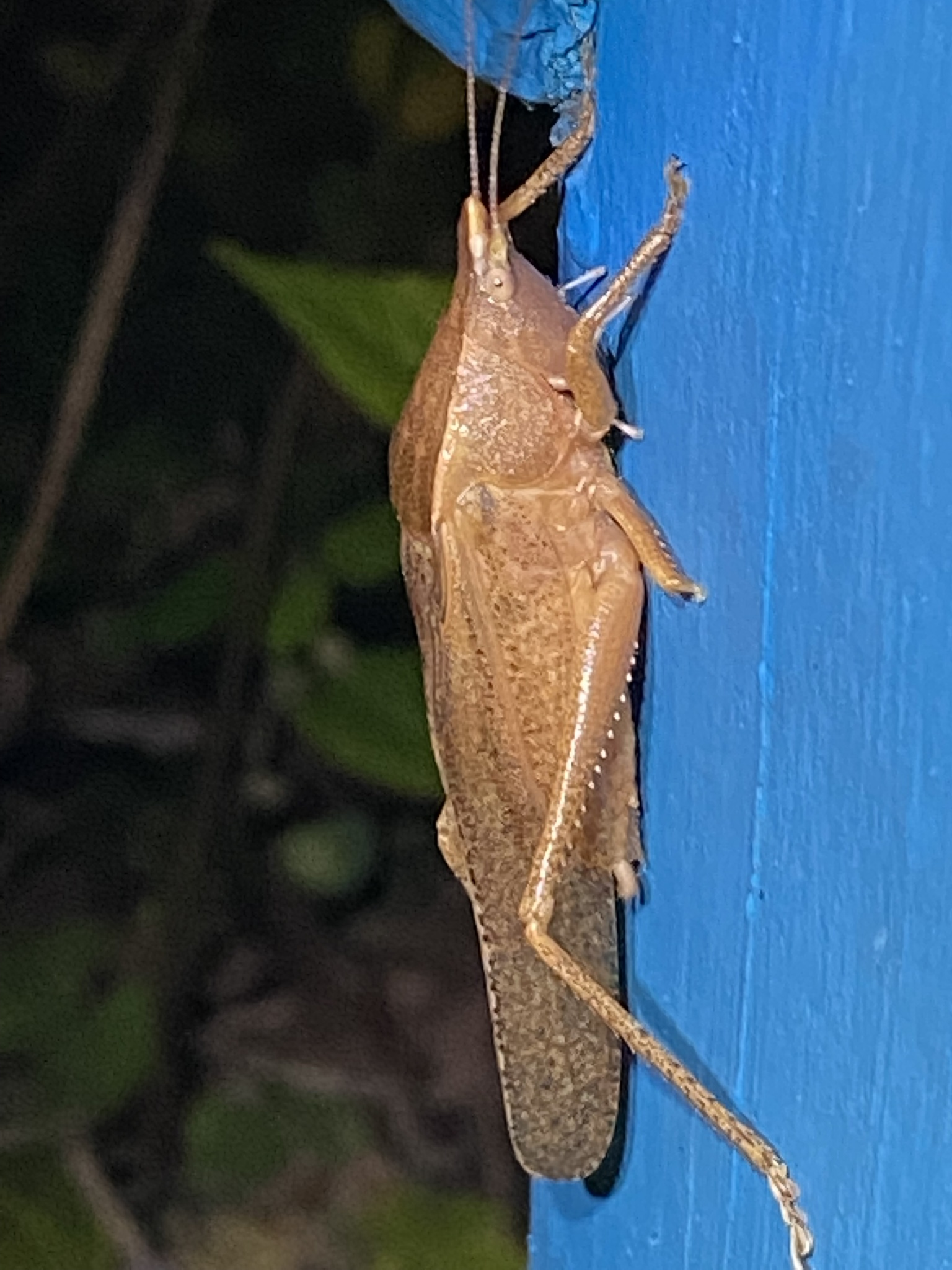

Scientific classification
- Domain: Eukaryota
- Kingdom: Animalia
- Phylum: Arthropoda
- Class: Insecta
- Order: Orthoptera
- Suborder: Ensifera
- Family: Tettigoniidae
- Tribe: Copiphorini
- Genus: Pyrgocorypha
- Species: P. uncinata

Binomial name
- Pyrgocorypha uncinata (Harris, 1841)

= Pyrgocorypha uncinata =

Species of cricket-like animal

Pyrgocorypha uncinata, the hook-faced conehead, is a species of conehead in the family Tettigoniidae. It is found in North America.
