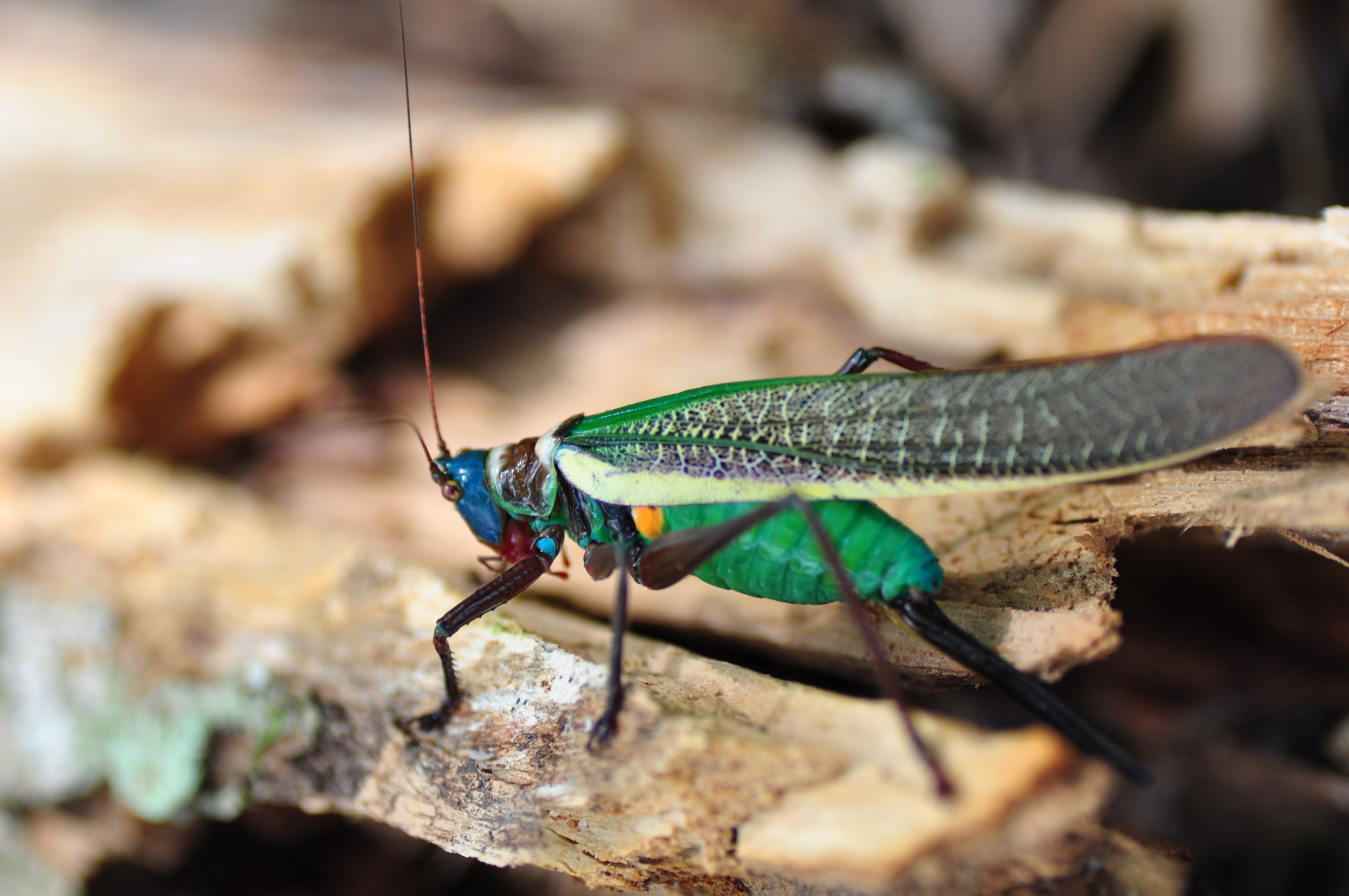
- Female Moncheca pretiosa in Chiapas, Mexico

Scientific classification
- Kingdom: Animalia
- Phylum: Arthropoda
- Class: Insecta
- Order: Orthoptera
- Suborder: Ensifera
- Family: Tettigoniidae
- Tribe: Copiphorini
- Genus: Moncheca; Walker, 1869

= Moncheca =

Genus of cricket-like animals

Moncheca is a genus of relatively large, colorful conehead katydids in the tribe Copiphorini, native to the Neotropics.

== Description and distribution ==
Moncheca inhabit humid forests in lowland and highlands (up to at least 2,735 m [8,973 ft] altitude) of tropical Mexico, Central America and South America.

Moncheca and the closely related Vestria, which both are known as crayola katydids, have bright aposematic colors and are among the few katydid genera to use chemical defenses against predators. They are able to secrete pyrazine compounds from their abdominal gland that repel birds and mammals. They are fairly large katydids where males generally are smaller than females; for example, in M. pretiosa, a widespread species found from Mexico to Bolivia, males typically are about 5 cm (2.0 in) long and females about 7 cm (2.8 in) long.

== Species ==
Moncheca includes the following species:

1. Moncheca bisulca (Saint-Fargeau & Serville, 1825)
2. Moncheca elegans (Giglio-Tos, 1898)
3. Moncheca hyalinata (Haan, 1842)
4. Moncheca pretiosa Walker, 1869 - type species
5. Moncheca spinifrons (Saussure & Pictet, 1898)
