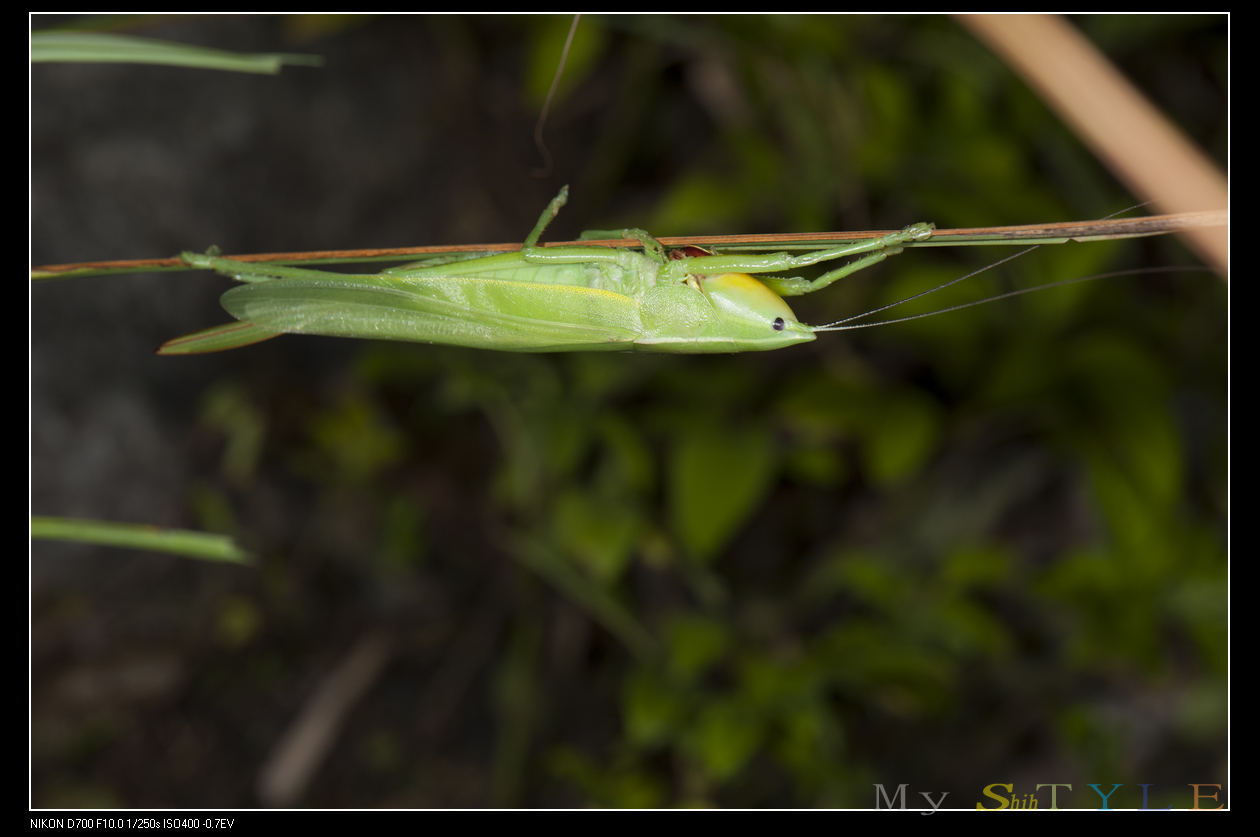
- Pseudorhynchus cf. gigas

Scientific classification
- Domain: Eukaryota
- Kingdom: Animalia
- Phylum: Arthropoda
- Class: Insecta
- Order: Orthoptera
- Suborder: Ensifera
- Family: Tettigoniidae
- Subfamily: Conocephalinae
- Tribe: Copiphorini
- Genus: Pseudorhynchus; Serville, 1838

Synonyms
- Pseudorynchus Leroy, 1985

= Pseudorhynchus =

Genus of cricket-like animals

Pseudorhynchus is an Asian genus of bush crickets in the tribe Copiphorini, belonging to the 'conehead' subfamily Conocephalinae.

== Distribution ==
Species of Pseudorhynchus have been recorded from: eastern mainland Africa, Madagascar, tropical Asia through to Australia and the Pacific islands.

== Species ==
The following species are recognised in the gemus Pseudorhynchus:

- Pseudorhynchus acuminatus Redtenbacher, 1891
- Pseudorhynchus antennalis Stål, 1877
- Pseudorhynchus calamus Rehn, 1909
- Pseudorhynchus concisus Walker, 1869
- Pseudorhynchus cornutus Redtenbacher, 1891
- Pseudorhynchus crassiceps Haan, 1842
- Pseudorhynchus crosskeyi Ragge, 1969
- Pseudorhynchus flavescens Serville, 1831
- Pseudorhynchus flavolineatus Redtenbacher, 1891
- Pseudorhynchus froggatti Kirby, 1906
- Pseudorhynchus gigas Redtenbacher, 1891
- Pseudorhynchus hastatus Bolívar, 1890
- Pseudorhynchus hastifer Schaum, 1853
- Pseudorhynchus inermis Karny, 1907
- Pseudorhynchus japonicus Shiraki, 1930
- Pseudorhynchus lanceolatus Fabricius, 1775 - type species (as P. sicarius Serville)
- Pseudorhynchus lessonii Serville, 1838
- Pseudorhynchus mimeticus Redtenbacher, 1891
- Pseudorhynchus minor Redtenbacher, 1891
- Pseudorhynchus nobilis Walker, 1869
- Pseudorhynchus porrigens Walker, 1869
- Pseudorhynchus pungens Schaum, 1853
- Pseudorhynchus raggei Bailey, 1980
- Pseudorhynchus robustus Willemse, 1953
- Pseudorhynchus selonis Bailey, 1980
