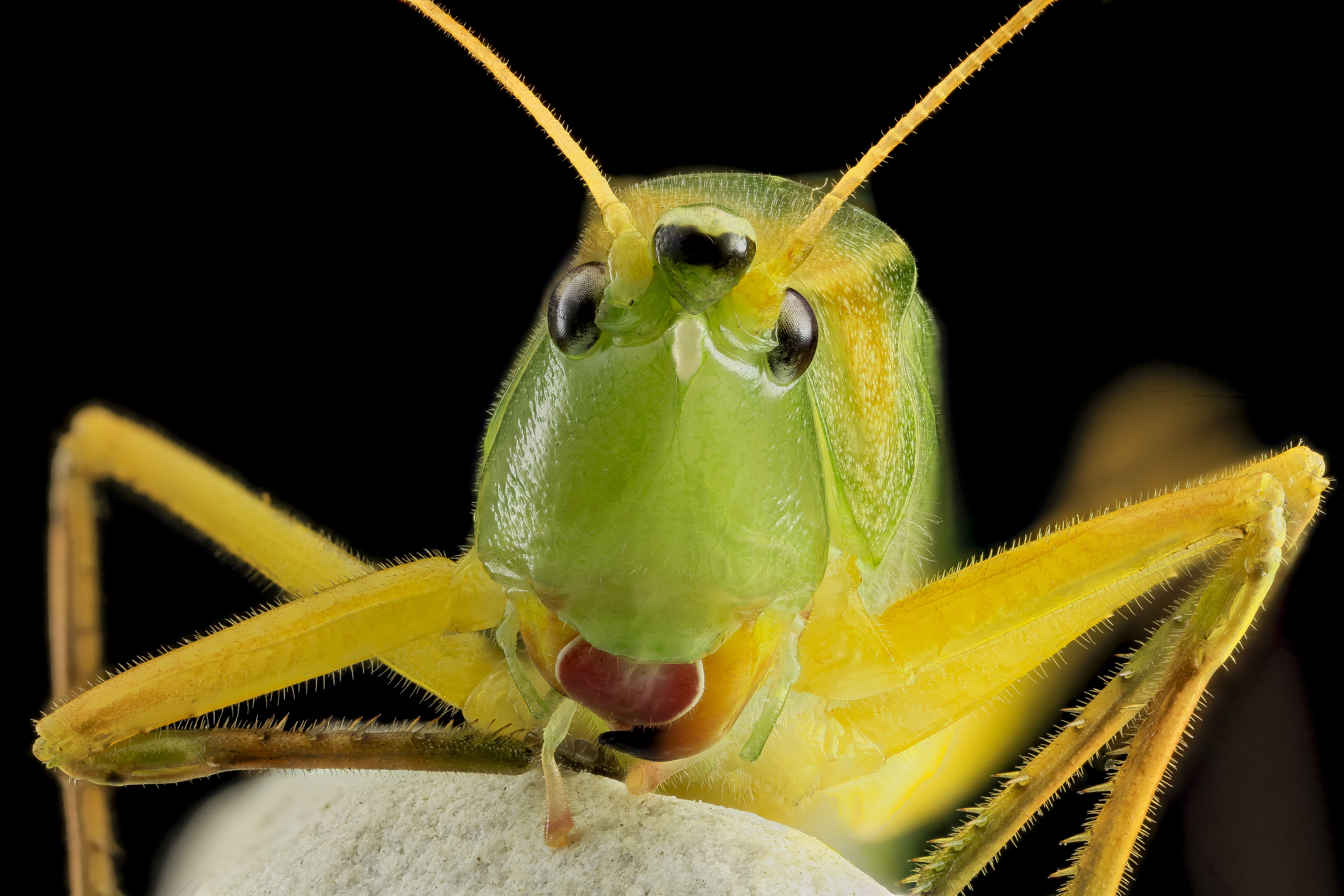

Scientific classification
- Kingdom: Animalia
- Phylum: Arthropoda
- Class: Insecta
- Order: Orthoptera
- Suborder: Ensifera
- Family: Tettigoniidae
- Genus: Neoconocephalus
- Species: N. retusus

Binomial name
- Neoconocephalus retusus (Scudder, 1878)

= Neoconocephalus retusus =

Species of cricket-like animal

Neoconocephalus retusus, the round-tipped conehead, is a species of katydid or bush cricket in the family Tettigoniidae. It is found in the eastern United States and southern Canada.

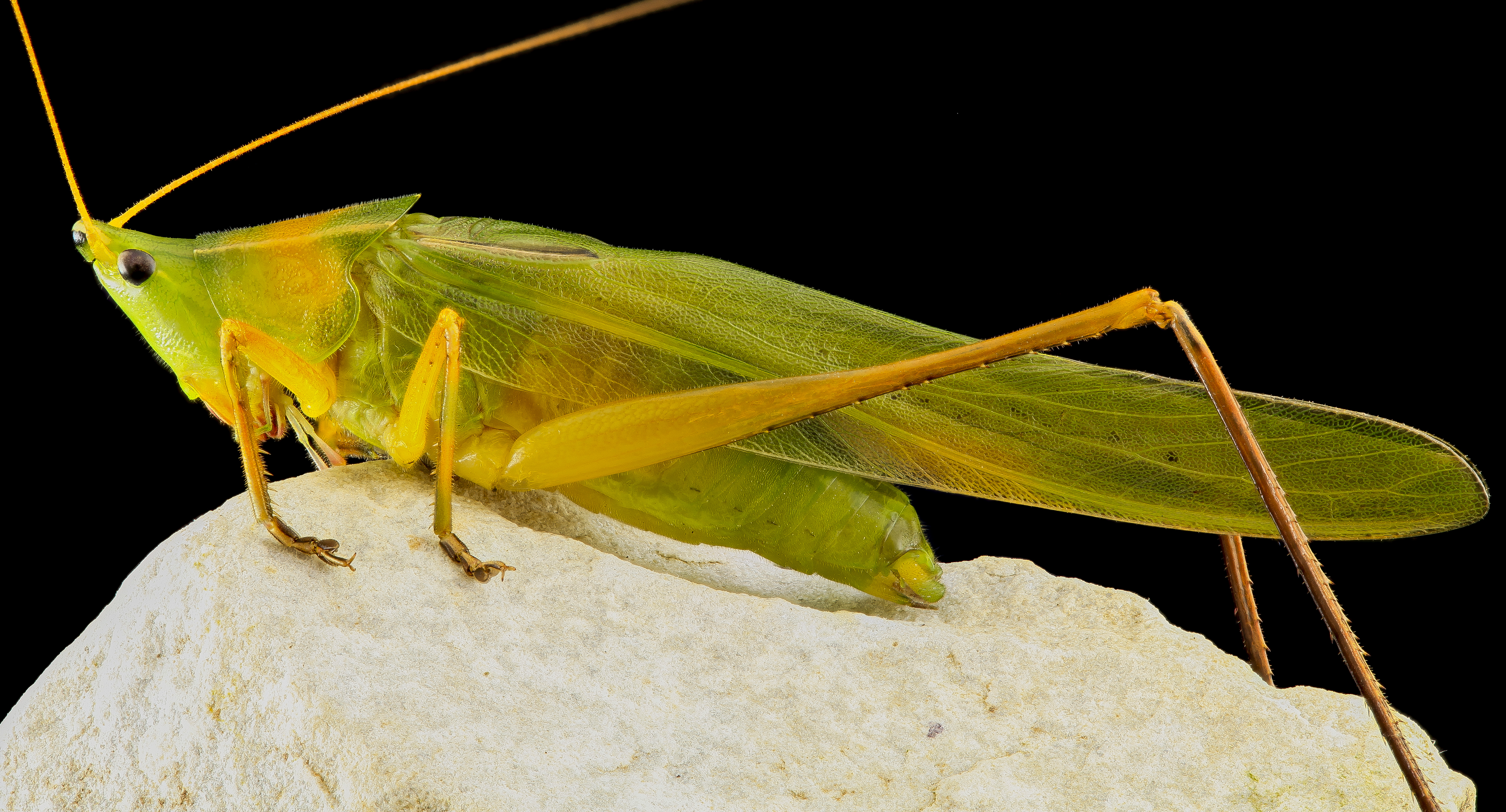
male specimen, Maryland, United States

Adult round-tipped coneheads range from 37 to 52 mm in length, and are commonly found in wet grassy and weedy areas during August, September, and October.
