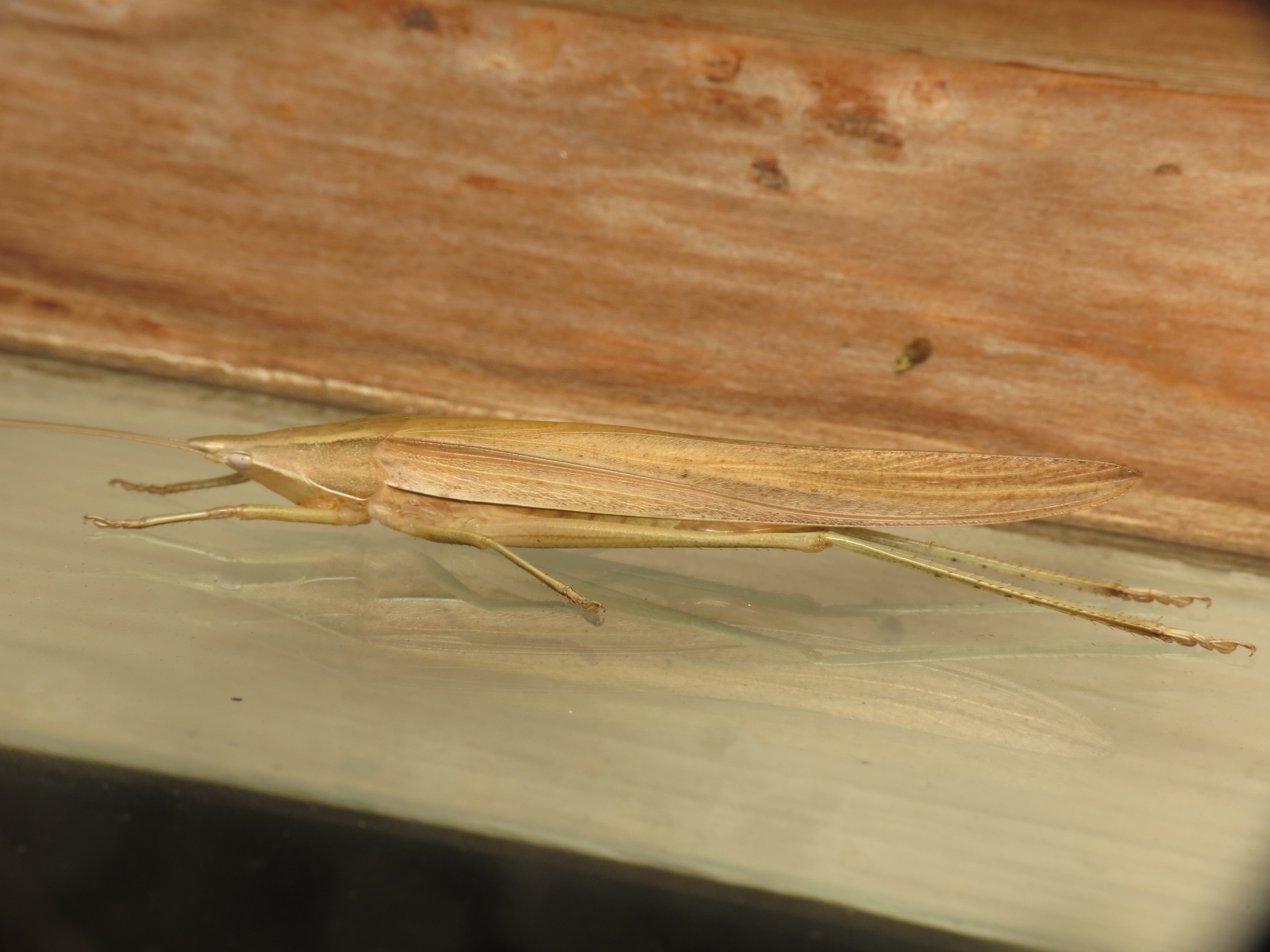
- Euconocephalus nasutus (Hawaii)

Scientific classification
- Domain: Eukaryota
- Kingdom: Animalia
- Phylum: Arthropoda
- Class: Insecta
- Order: Orthoptera
- Suborder: Ensifera
- Family: Tettigoniidae
- Subfamily: Conocephalinae
- Tribe: Copiphorini
- Genus: Euconocephalus; H. H. Karny, 1907

= Euconocephalus =

Genus of cricket-like animals

Euconocephalus is a genus of bush cricket in the 'conehead' tribe Copiphorini.

== Species ==
The Orthoptera Species File lists the following species, distributed through Africa, tropical Asia, Australia to the Pacific islands:

- Euconocephalus afer (Karny, 1907)
- Euconocephalus australis (Bolívar, 1884)
- Euconocephalus blandus (Serville, 1838)
- Euconocephalus brachyxiphus (Redtenbacher, 1891)
- Euconocephalus broughtoni Bailey, 1980
- Euconocephalus budaunensis Farooqi & Usmani, 2019
- Euconocephalus clarus (Walker, 1869)
- Euconocephalus coarctatus (Redtenbacher, 1891)
- Euconocephalus coniceps (Redtenbacher, 1891)
- Euconocephalus cristovallensis (Montrouzier, 1855)
- Euconocephalus erythropus (Karny, 1907)
- Euconocephalus femoralis (Walker, 1869)
- Euconocephalus formosanus (Matsumura & Shiraki, 1908)
- Euconocephalus gracilis (Redtenbacher, 1891)
- Euconocephalus incertus (Walker, 1869)
- Euconocephalus insulanus (Redtenbacher, 1891)
- Euconocephalus lineatipes (Bolívar, 1890)
- Euconocephalus longissimus Wang, Shi & Ou, 2011
- Euconocephalus mucro (Haan, 1843)
- Euconocephalus nasutus (Thunberg, 1815) - type species (as Locusta acuminata Fabricius)
- Euconocephalus pallidus (Redtenbacher, 1891)
- Euconocephalus picteti (Redtenbacher, 1891)
- Euconocephalus princeps (Karny, 1907)
- Euconocephalus pyrifer (Redtenbacher, 1891)
- Euconocephalus remotus (Walker, 1869)
- Euconocephalus rosaceus (Walker, 1869)
- Euconocephalus saussurei (Redtenbacher, 1891)
- Euconocephalus sumbaensis Willemse, 1953
- Euconocephalus thunbergii (Montrouzier, 1855)
- Euconocephalus troudeti (Le Guillou, 1841)
- Euconocephalus turpis (Walker, 1869)
- Euconocephalus ultimus (Krausze, 1904)
- Euconocephalus ustulatus (Redtenbacher, 1891)
- Euconocephalus vaginalis (Redtenbacher, 1891)
- Euconocephalus varius (Walker, 1869)
- Euconocephalus veruger (Serville, 1838)
