= Belocephalus =

Scientific classification
- Domain: Eukaryota
- Kingdom: Animalia
- Phylum: Arthropoda
- Class: Insecta
- Order: Orthoptera
- Suborder: Ensifera
- Family: Tettigoniidae
- Tribe: Copiphorini
- Genus: Belocephalus; Scudder, 1875

Genus of cricket-like animals

Belocephalus is a genus of short-winged coneheads in the family Tettigoniidae. Coneheads are a type of bush crickets or katydids. There are about eight described species in Belocephalus.

== Species ==
These eight species belong to the genus Belocephalus:

- Belocephalus davisi Rehn & Hebard, 1916^{i c g b} (Davis's conehead)
- Belocephalus hebardi Davis, 1912^{i c g}
- Belocephalus hesperus Hebard, 1926^{c g}
- Belocephalus micanopy Davis, 1914^{i c g}
- Belocephalus sabalis Davis, 1912^{i c g b} (palmetto conehead)
- Belocephalus sleighti Davis, 1914^{i c g}
- Belocephalus subapterus Scudder, 1875^{i c g}
- Belocephalus uncinatus Hebard, 1927^{i c g}

Data sources: i = ITIS, c = Catalogue of Life, g = GBIF, b = Bugguide.net
