= Nīhoa conehead katydid =

Conservation status
- Vulnerable (IUCN 2.3)

Scientific classification
- Kingdom: Animalia
- Phylum: Arthropoda
- Clade: Pancrustacea
- Class: Insecta
- Order: Orthoptera
- Suborder: Ensifera
- Family: Tettigoniidae
- Genus: Banza
- Species: B. nihoa

Binomial name
- Banza nihoa Hebard, 1926

Species of cricket-like animal

The Nīhoa conehead katydid (Banza nihoa) is a species of katydid which is endemic to the Hawaiian island of Nīhoa (Northwestern Hawaiian Islands). It is one of the ten species in the genus Banza, all of them native to Hawaii, although it is the sister species to the remaining nine, and may belong in a separate genus. It gets its food mostly from plant leaves, but because of the low population, it does not do significant damage. Unlike Main Islands' species, whose males leap on the females before mating, the Nīhoa variants sing to them. It is listed as a vulnerable species on the IUCN Red List, and as a "species of concern" under the Endangered Species Act.
