= Euconocephalus remotus =

Conservation status
- Vulnerable (IUCN 2.3)

Scientific classification
- Kingdom: Animalia
- Phylum: Arthropoda
- Class: Insecta
- Order: Orthoptera
- Suborder: Ensifera
- Family: Tettigoniidae
- Genus: Euconocephalus
- Species: E. remotus

Binomial name
- Euconocephalus remotus (Walker, 1869)

Synonyms
- Conocephaloides remotus Walker, 1869

Species of cricket-like animal

Euconocephalus remotus is a species of insect in the family Tettigoniidae. It was described by Francis Walker in 1869 and is endemic to the Hawaiian Islands.
