= Xestophrys =

Scientific classification
- Domain: Eukaryota
- Kingdom: Animalia
- Phylum: Arthropoda
- Class: Insecta
- Order: Orthoptera
- Suborder: Ensifera
- Family: Tettigoniidae
- Subfamily: Conocephalinae
- Tribe: Copiphorini
- Genus: Xestophrys; Redtenbacher, 1891

Genus of cricket-like animals

Xestophrys is an Asian genus of bush crickets in the tribe Copiphorini, belonging to the 'conehead' subfamily Conocephalinae.

== Species ==
The Orthoptera Species File lists:

1. Xestophrys agraensis Farooqi & Usmani, 2018
2. Xestophrys horvathi Bolívar, 1905
3. Xestophrys indicus Karny, 1907
4. Xestophrys javanicus Redtenbacher, 1891 - type species
5. Xestophrys namtseringa Kumar & Chandra, 2019
