= Belocephalus micanopy =

Conservation status
- Vulnerable (IUCN 2.3)

Scientific classification
- Kingdom: Animalia
- Phylum: Arthropoda
- Class: Insecta
- Order: Orthoptera
- Suborder: Ensifera
- Family: Tettigoniidae
- Genus: Belocephalus
- Species: B. micanopy

Binomial name
- Belocephalus micanopy Davis, 1914

Species of cricket-like animal

Belocephalus micanopy, known as the Big Pine Key conehead katydid, is a species of katydid that is endemic to the Florida Keys.
