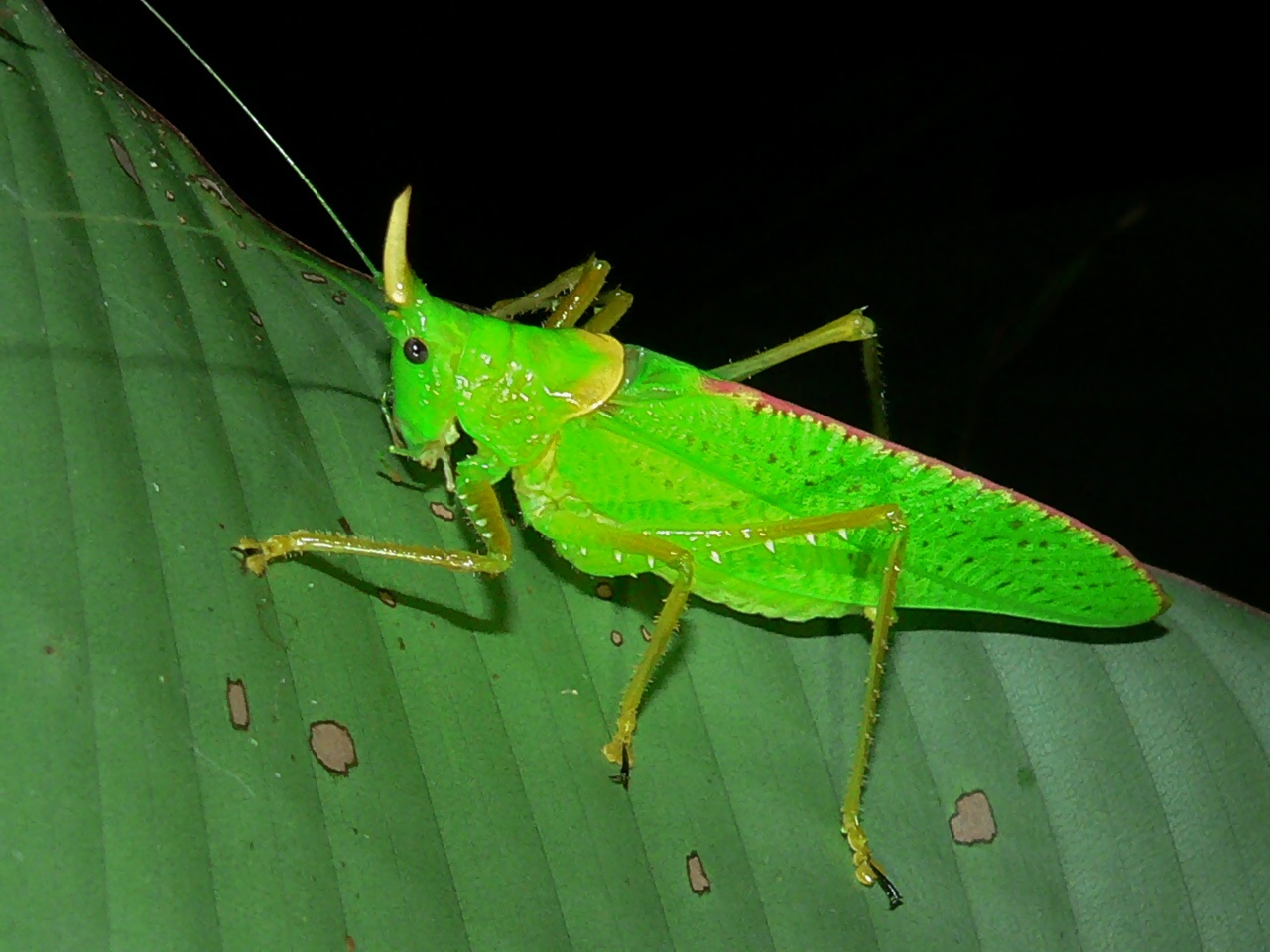

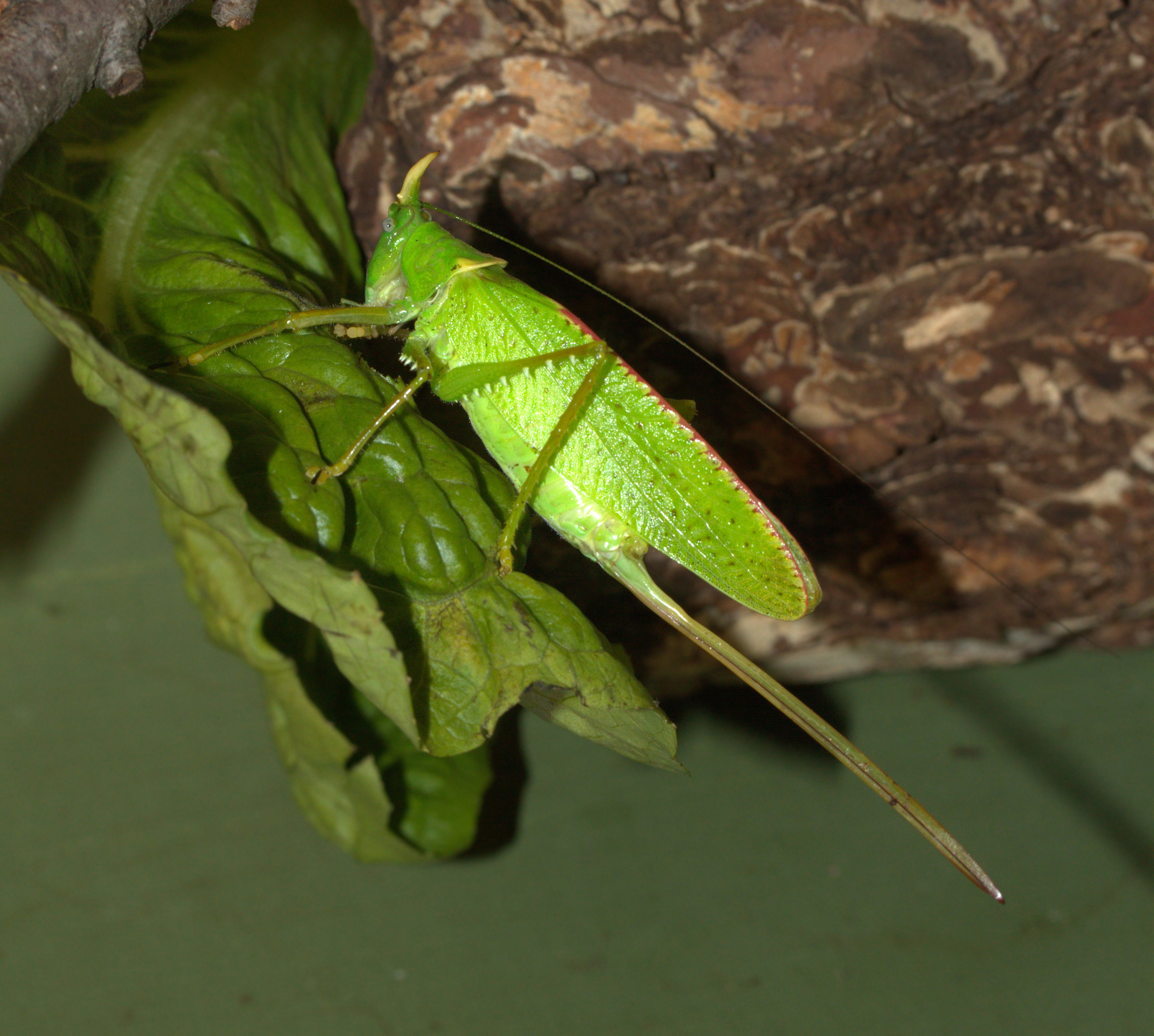
- Male above, females below (note prominent ovipositor)

Scientific classification
- Domain: Eukaryota
- Kingdom: Animalia
- Phylum: Arthropoda
- Class: Insecta
- Order: Orthoptera
- Suborder: Ensifera
- Family: Tettigoniidae
- Genus: Copiphora
- Species: C. rhinoceros

Binomial name
- Copiphora rhinoceros Pictet, 1888

= Copiphora rhinoceros =

Species of cricket-like animal

Copiphora rhinoceros, the rhinoceros katydid, is a relatively large, up to about 7.5 cm (3 in) long, species of katydid found in Central America. It belongs to a group known as the conehead katydids, several of which have a horn-like projection on the top of the head. The horn of the rhinoceros katydid is used to ward off attacks from hungry bats. Unlike most katydids, which are herbivores, the rhinoceros katydid is an omnivore, feeding on fruit, seeds, flowers, invertebrates, frog eggs and small lizards. The species can be quite noisy during the night and produces one of the dominant sounds in Central American lowland forests. Its lifespan is one to two years.

It was first described in 1888 by Alphonse Pictet in his Locustides Nouveaux ou peu connus de Musée de Genève (New or Little-known Locusts of the Geneva Museum).
