= Ruspolia baileyi =

Scientific classification
- Domain: Eukaryota
- Kingdom: Animalia
- Phylum: Arthropoda
- Class: Insecta
- Order: Orthoptera
- Suborder: Ensifera
- Family: Tettigoniidae
- Genus: Ruspolia
- Species: R. baileyi

Binomial name
- Ruspolia baileyi Otte, 1997

Synonyms
- Homorocoryphus brevipennis Chopard, 1954

Species of cricket-like animal

Ruspolia baileyi is a species of bush cricket found in Guinea.
