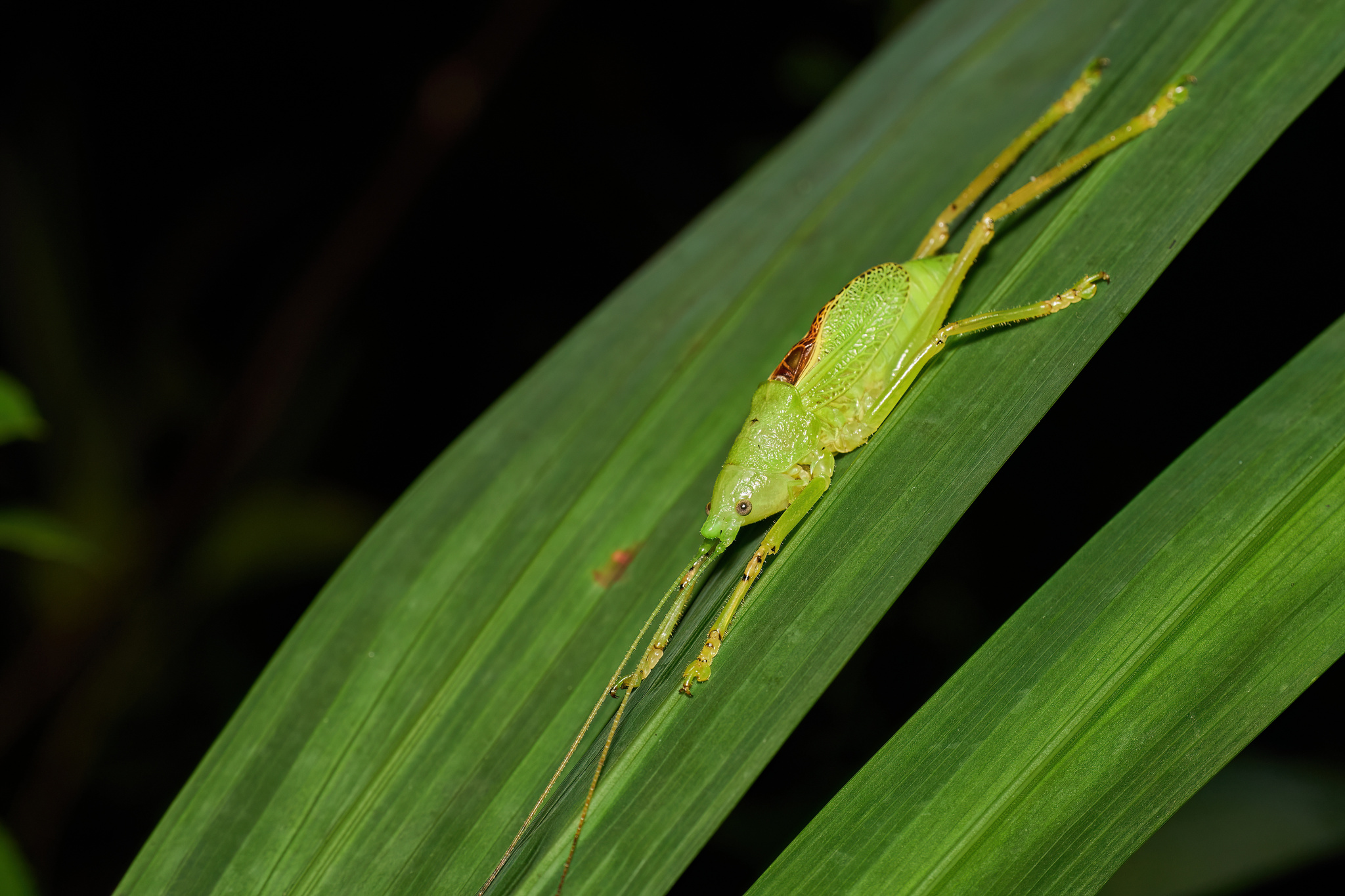

Scientific classification
- Domain: Eukaryota
- Kingdom: Animalia
- Phylum: Arthropoda
- Class: Insecta
- Order: Orthoptera
- Suborder: Ensifera
- Family: Tettigoniidae
- Genus: Banza
- Species: B. nitida

Binomial name
- Banza nitida Brunner von Wattenwyl, 1895

= Banza nitida =

Species of katydid

Banza nitida, the Hawai'i rainforest katydid, is a species of conehead katydid endemic to the Big Island of Hawai'i, where it inhabits native forests across the island.

== Description ==
Banza nitida is a green and brown conehead katydid approximately 20mm across with uniformly green antennae.

== Distribution and habitat ==
Historically, Banza nitida was present in native forests across the island, with collections near Kona, Kohala, and the Stainback highway near Hilo.
