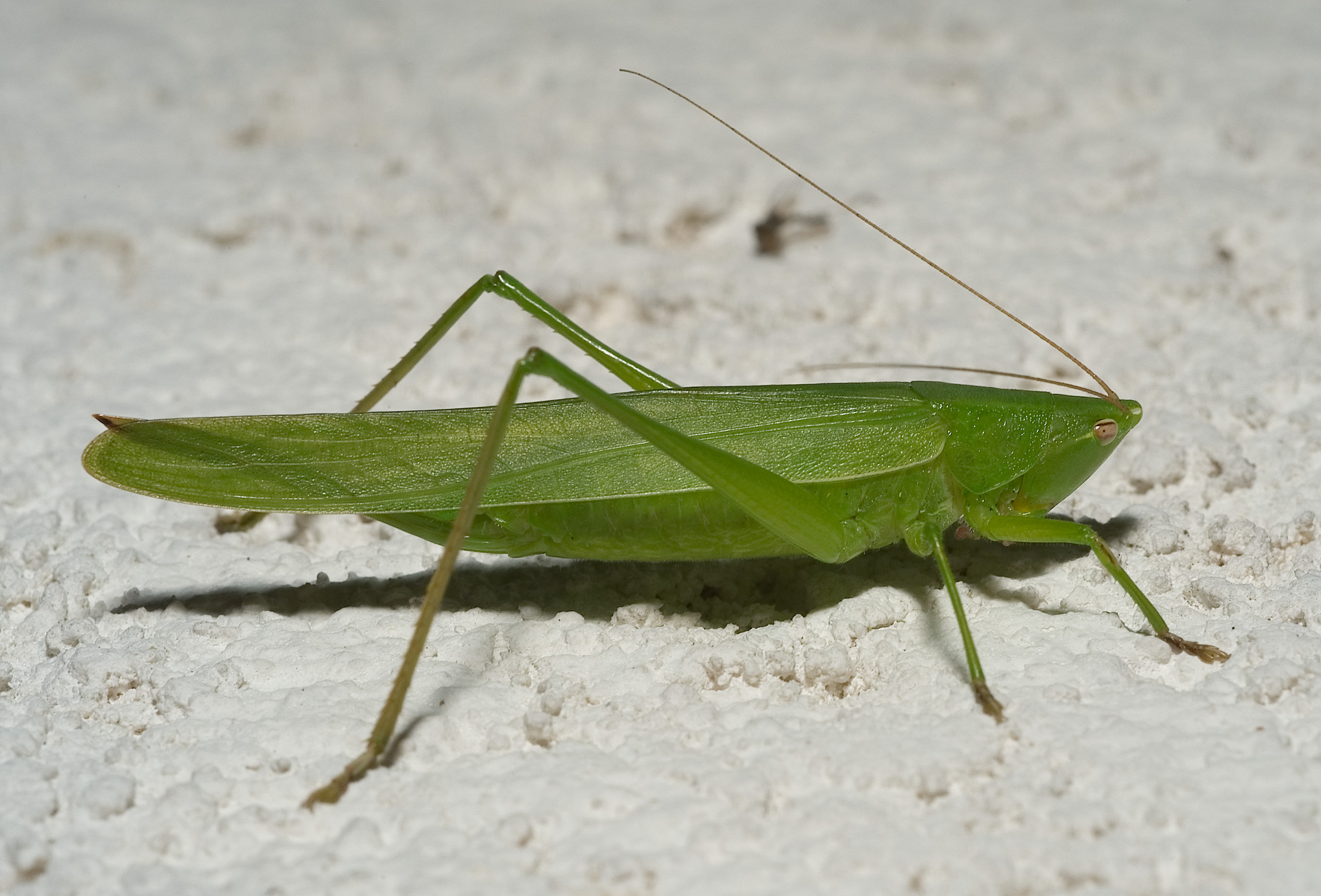
- Ruspolia nitidula

Scientific classification
- Domain: Eukaryota
- Kingdom: Animalia
- Phylum: Arthropoda
- Class: Insecta
- Order: Orthoptera
- Suborder: Ensifera
- Family: Tettigoniidae
- Tribe: Copiphorini
- Genus: Ruspolia; Schulthess Schindler, 1898

= Ruspolia =

Genus of cricket-like animals

Ruspolia is a genus of bush crickets in the subfamily Conocephalinae. This genus includes species that may be called 'cone-heads', but the name has also been used for Conocephalus and other genera in the subfamily.

== Distribution ==
The genus has a widespread distribution with species found in most continents (except N. America and Antarctica).

== Species ==
The Orthoptera species file lists:

1. Ruspolia abruptus Walker, 1869
2. Ruspolia ampla Walker, 1869
3. Ruspolia aostae Karny, 1920
4. Ruspolia baileyi Otte, 1997
5. Ruspolia basiguttata Bolívar, 1906
6. Ruspolia brachixipha Redtenbacher, 1891
7. Ruspolia breviceps Walker, 1870
8. Ruspolia consobrina Walker, 1869
9. Ruspolia differens Serville, 1838
10. Ruspolia diversa Walker, 1869
11. Ruspolia dubia Redtenbacher, 1891
12. Ruspolia egregius Karny, 1907
13. Ruspolia exigua Bolívar, 1922
14. Ruspolia flavovirens Karny, 1907
15. Ruspolia fuscopunctata Karny, 1907
16. Ruspolia halmaherae Brunner von Wattenwyl, 1898
17. Ruspolia indicator Walker, 1869
18. Ruspolia insularis Walker, 1869
19. Ruspolia intactus Walker, 1869
20. Ruspolia interruptus Walker, 1869
21. Ruspolia jaegeri Roy, 1971
22. Ruspolia kashmira Shah, Usmani, Ali & Dar, 2021
23. Ruspolia knipperi Otte, 1996 - nomen dubium
24. Ruspolia latiarma Bailey, 1975
25. Ruspolia lemairei Griffini, 1909
26. Ruspolia liangshanensis Lian & Liu, 1992
27. Ruspolia lineosa Walker, 1869
28. Ruspolia macroxiphus Redtenbacher, 1891
29. Ruspolia madagassa Redtenbacher, 1891
30. Ruspolia marshallae Bailey, 1980
31. Ruspolia nitidula Scopoli, 1786
32. Ruspolia paraplesia Karny, 1907
33. Ruspolia persimilis Griffini, 1909
34. Ruspolia praeligata Bolívar, 1922
35. Ruspolia pulchella Karny, 1907
36. Ruspolia punctipennis Chopard, 1954
37. Ruspolia pygmaea Schulthess Schindler, 1898 - type species
38. Ruspolia pyrgocorypha Karny, 1920
39. Ruspolia ruthae Bailey, 1975
40. Ruspolia sarae Bailey, 1975
41. Ruspolia subampla Bailey, 1975
42. Ruspolia yunnana Lian & Liu, 1992
