= Banza (katydid) =

Scientific classification
- Kingdom: Animalia
- Phylum: Arthropoda
- Class: Insecta
- Order: Orthoptera
- Suborder: Ensifera
- Family: Tettigoniidae
- Tribe: Copiphorini
- Genus: Banza; Walker, 1870

Synonyms
- Brachymetopa Redtenbacher, 1891; Microsaga Saussure, 1888

Genus of cricket-like animals

Banza is a genus of conehead bush crickets found in Korea, Japan, and Pacific islands including Hawaii.

== Species ==
Species include:

1. Banza affinis (Perkins, 1899)
2. Banza brunnea (Perkins, 1899)
3. Banza crassipes Perkins, 1899
4. Banza deplanata Brunner von Wattenwyl, 1895
5. Banza kauaiensis (Perkins, 1899)
6. Banza mauiensis Perkins, 1899
7. Banza molokaiensis (Perkins, 1899)
8. Banza nihoa Hebard, 1926
9. Banza nitida (Brunner von Wattenwyl, 1895)
10. Banza parvula (Walker, 1869)
  - type species (as Banza nigrifrons Walker, F.)
11. Banza unica (Perkins, 1899)
