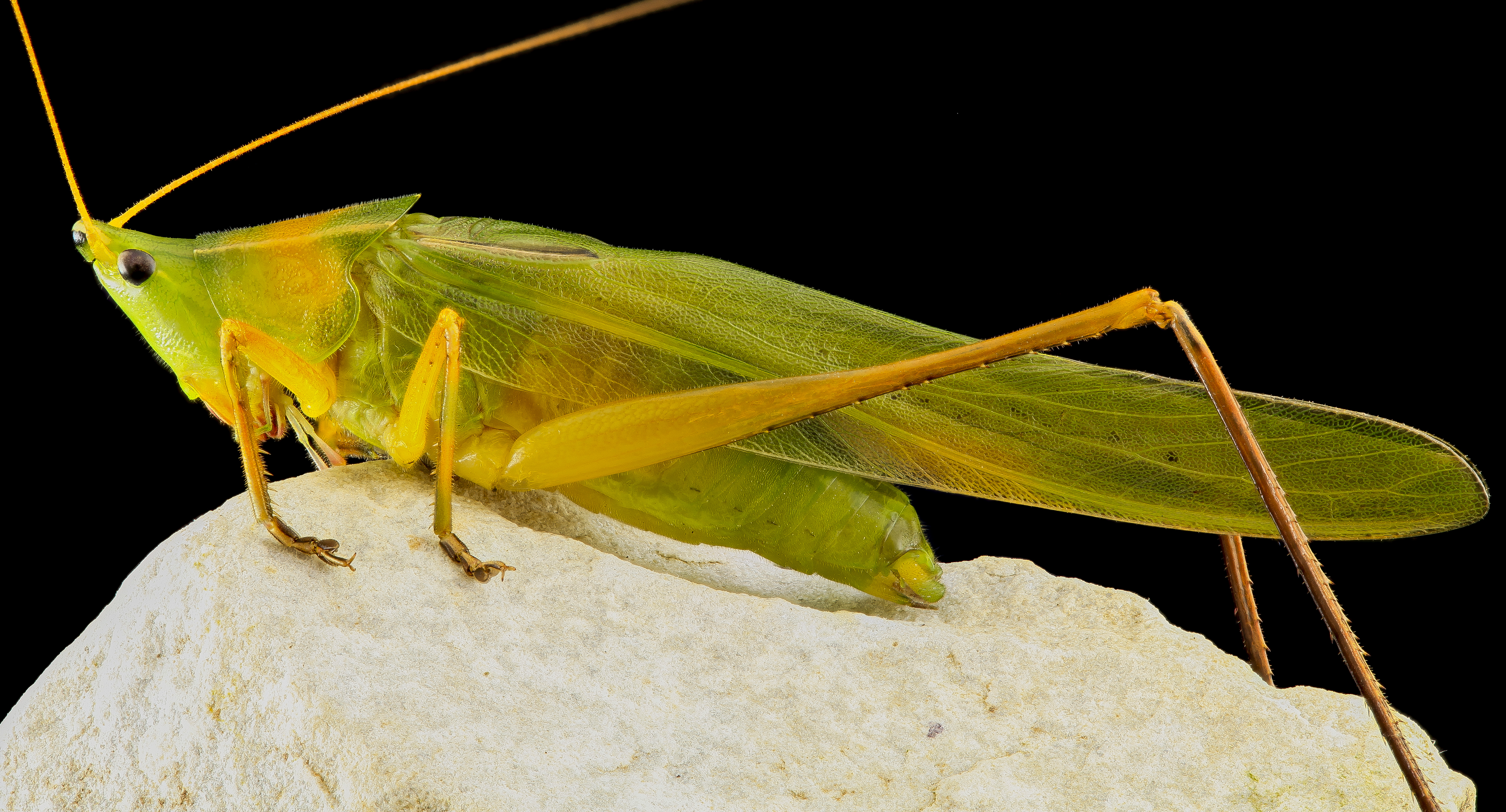
- Neoconocephalus retusus

Scientific classification
- Domain: Eukaryota
- Kingdom: Animalia
- Phylum: Arthropoda
- Class: Insecta
- Order: Orthoptera
- Suborder: Ensifera
- Family: Tettigoniidae
- Subfamily: Conocephalinae
- Tribe: Copiphorini
- Genus: Neoconocephalus; Karny, 1907

= Neoconocephalus =

Genus of cricket-like animals

Neoconocephalus is a genus of katydids or bush crickets in the tribe Copiphorini, from the Americas.

== Species ==
- Neoconocephalus aduncus Scudder, 1878
- Neoconocephalus affinis Beauvois, 1805
- Neoconocephalus alienus Walker, 1869
- Neoconocephalus americanus Karny, 1907
- Neoconocephalus anodon Redtenbacher, 1891
- Neoconocephalus argentinus Redtenbacher, 1891
- Neoconocephalus aries Scudder, 1878
- Neoconocephalus assimilis Karny, 1907
- Neoconocephalus bivocatus Walker, Whitesell & Alexander, 1973
- Neoconocephalus bolivari Redtenbacher, 1891
- Neoconocephalus boraceae Piza, 1952
- Neoconocephalus boraceanus Piza, 1983
- Neoconocephalus brachypterus Redtenbacher, 1891
- Neoconocephalus brevis Redtenbacher, 1891
- Neoconocephalus brunneri Redtenbacher, 1891
- Neoconocephalus carbonarius Redtenbacher, 1891
- Neoconocephalus carinatus Redtenbacher, 1891
- Neoconocephalus caudellianus Davis, 1905
- Neoconocephalus chapadensis Bruner, 1915
- Neoconocephalus colligatus Walker, 1869
- Neoconocephalus colorificus Walker, 1869
- Neoconocephalus conifrons Redtenbacher, 1891
- Neoconocephalus conspersus Redtenbacher, 1891
- Neoconocephalus corumbaensis Piza, 1969
- Neoconocephalus creusae Piza, 1970
- Neoconocephalus curitibensis Piza, 1952
- Neoconocephalus cylindricus Karny, 1907
- Neoconocephalus dispar Karny, 1907
- Neoconocephalus elongatus Redtenbacher, 1891
- Neoconocephalus ensifer Bolívar, 1884
- Neoconocephalus ensiger Harris, 1841
- Neoconocephalus exaltatus Walker, 1869
- Neoconocephalus exiliscanorus Davis, 1887
- Neoconocephalus ferreirai Piza, 1971
- Neoconocephalus finitimus Karny, 1907
- Neoconocephalus flavirostris Redtenbacher, 1891
- Neoconocephalus fratellus Griffini, 1899
- Neoconocephalus fuscinervis Redtenbacher, 1891
- Neoconocephalus gaucho Piza, 1969
- Neoconocephalus giganticus Bruner, 1915
- Neoconocephalus gladiator Redtenbacher, 1891
- Neoconocephalus globiceps Karny, 1907
- Neoconocephalus globifer Redtenbacher, 1891
- Neoconocephalus globifrons Karny, 1907
- Neoconocephalus globosus Karny, 1907
- Neoconocephalus gracilipes Bolívar, 1884
- Neoconocephalus guyvalerioi Piza, 1972
- Neoconocephalus harti Karny, 1909
- Neoconocephalus ichneumoneus Bolívar, 1884
- Neoconocephalus incertus Piza, 1958
- Neoconocephalus infuscatus Scudder, 1875
- Neoconocephalus irroratus Burmeister, 1838
- Neoconocephalus karollenkoi Piza, 1983
- Neoconocephalus kraussi Redtenbacher, 1891
- Neoconocephalus lancifer Burmeister, 1838
- Neoconocephalus lavrensis Piza, 1971
- Neoconocephalus longicauda Karny, 1907
- Neoconocephalus longifossor Bruner, 1915
- Neoconocephalus lyristes Rehn & Hebard, 1905
- Neoconocephalus maculosus Redtenbacher, 1891
- Neoconocephalus major Karny, 1907
- Neoconocephalus matogrossensis Piza, 1983
- Neoconocephalus maxillosus Fabricius, 1775
- Neoconocephalus maximus Karny, 1907
- Neoconocephalus melanorhinus Rehn & Hebard, 1907
- Neoconocephalus meridionalis Kirby, 1906
- Neoconocephalus mexicanus Saussure, 1859
- Neoconocephalus minor Karny, 1907
- Neoconocephalus monoceros Stoll, 1813
- Neoconocephalus nebrascensis Bruner, 1891
- Neoconocephalus necessarius Redtenbacher, 1891
- Neoconocephalus nigricans Redtenbacher, 1891
- Neoconocephalus nigromaculatus Redtenbacher, 1891
- Neoconocephalus nigrosignatus Karny, 1907
- Neoconocephalus occidentalis Saussure, 1859
- Neoconocephalus pahayokee Walker & Whitesell, 1978
- Neoconocephalus palustris Blatchley, 1893
- Neoconocephalus paravicinus Piza, 1973
- Neoconocephalus parvus Redtenbacher, 1891
- Neoconocephalus pichinchae Bolívar, 1881
- Neoconocephalus pinicola Walker & Greenfield, 1983
- Neoconocephalus pipulus Walker & Greenfield, 1983
- Neoconocephalus prasinus Redtenbacher, 1891
- Neoconocephalus precarius Piza, 1975
- Neoconocephalus procerus Redtenbacher, 1891
- Neoconocephalus productus Karny, 1907
- Neoconocephalus proximus Redtenbacher, 1891
- Neoconocephalus puiggarii Bolívar, 1884
- Neoconocephalus pulcher Karny, 1907
- Neoconocephalus pullus Karny, 1907
- Neoconocephalus punctipes Redtenbacher, 1891
- Neoconocephalus purpurascens Walker, 1869
- Neoconocephalus redtenbacheri Karny, 1907
- Neoconocephalus restrictus Walker, 1869
- Neoconocephalus retusiformis Walker & Greenfield, 1983
- Neoconocephalus retusus Scudder, 1878
- Neoconocephalus rioclarensis Piza, 1975
- Neoconocephalus riparius Piza, 1983
- Neoconocephalus robustus Scudder, 1862
- Neoconocephalus rufescens Redtenbacher, 1891
- Neoconocephalus rugosicollis Bolívar, 1881
- Neoconocephalus saturatus Griffini, 1899
- Neoconocephalus scudderii Bolívar, 1881
- Neoconocephalus similis Karny, 1907
- Neoconocephalus simulator Walker, 1869
- Neoconocephalus spiniger Redtenbacher, 1891
- Neoconocephalus spitzi Piza, 1983
- Neoconocephalus spiza Walker & Greenfield, 1983
- Neoconocephalus stigmaticus Karny, 1907
- Neoconocephalus subulatus Bolívar, 1881
- Neoconocephalus susurrator Walker & Greenfield, 1983
- Neoconocephalus tenuicauda Scudder, 1869
- Neoconocephalus testaceus Redtenbacher, 1891
- Neoconocephalus triops Linnaeus, 1758
- Neoconocephalus trochiceps Karny, 1907
- Neoconocephalus truncatirostris Redtenbacher, 1891
- Neoconocephalus tuberculatus De Geer, 1773
- Neoconocephalus tumidus Karny, 1907
- Neoconocephalus velox Rehn & Hebard, 1914
- Neoconocephalus vernalis Kirby, 1890
- Neoconocephalus vicinus Karny, 1907
- Neoconocephalus virescens Karny, 1907
- Neoconocephalus viridis Redtenbacher, 1891
- Neoconocephalus vittatus Piza, 1973
- Neoconocephalus vittifrons Redtenbacher, 1891
- Neoconocephalus vittipennis Walker, 1869
- Neoconocephalus xiphias Saint-Fargeau & Serville, 1825
- Neoconocephalus xiphophorus Piza, 1975
