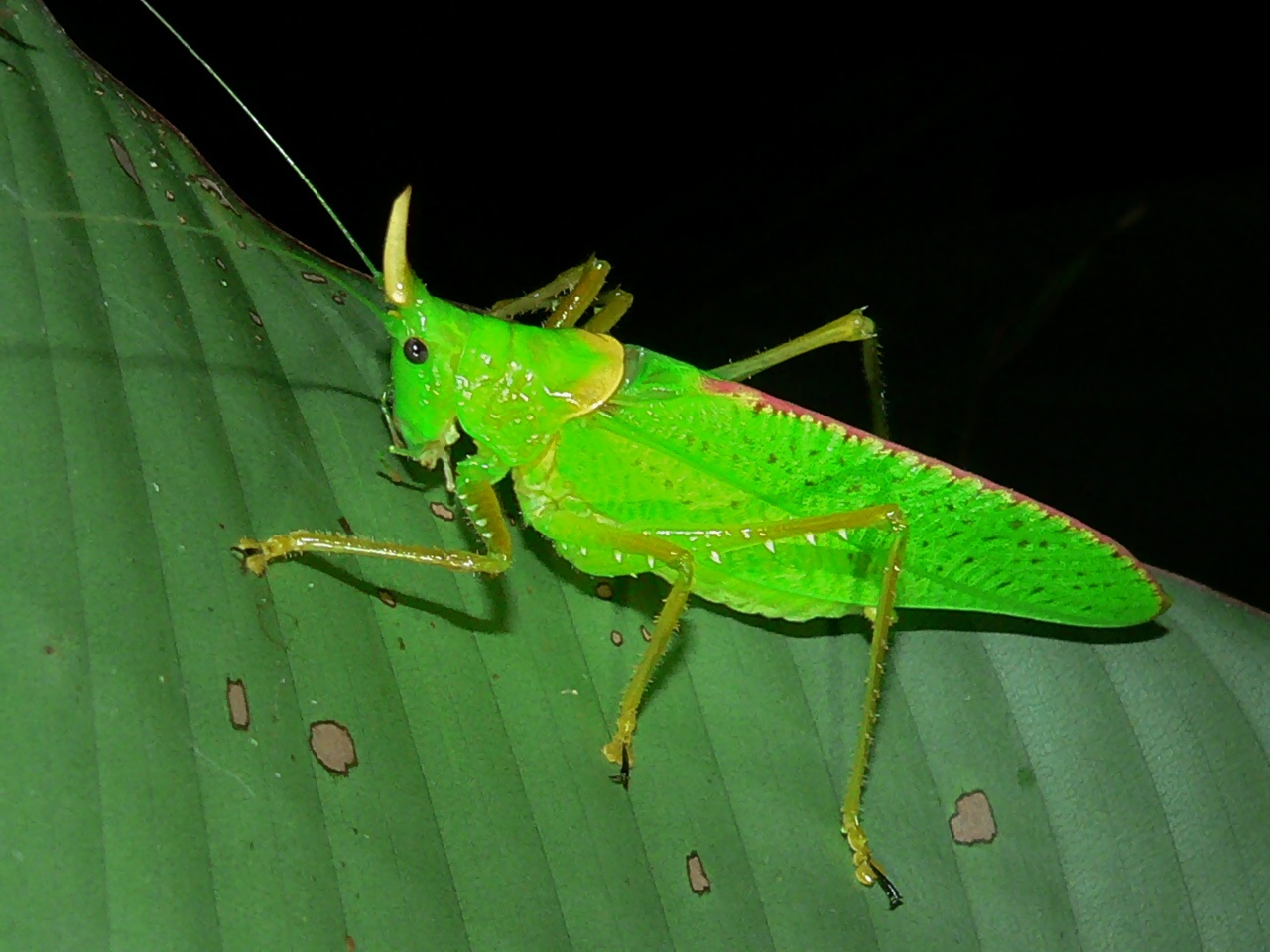
- Male Copiphora rhinoceros in Costa Rica

Scientific classification
- Domain: Eukaryota
- Kingdom: Animalia
- Phylum: Arthropoda
- Class: Insecta
- Order: Orthoptera
- Suborder: Ensifera
- Family: Tettigoniidae
- Tribe: Copiphorini
- Genus: Copiphora; Serville, 1831

= Copiphora =

Genus of cricket-like animals

Copiphora is a genus of bush crickets or katydids in the subfamily Copiphorinae (coneheads) from southern Mexico, Central America and South America, with a single doubtful species, C. subulata, from Africa.

Copiphora are typically fairly large nocturnal katydids with a conspicuous horn-like structure on the top of their head (indistinct in a few species). Copiphora are omnivorous, but with strong predatory tendencies with large individuals even able to catch small frogs and lizards. They can be quite noisy during the night and certain species produce some of the dominant sounds in their habitat.

== Taxonomy ==
Species include:

- Copiphora azteca Saussure & Pictet, 1898
- Copiphora brachyptera Karny, 1907
- Copiphora brevicauda Karny, 1907
- Copiphora brevicornis Redtenbacher, 1891
- Copiphora brevipennis Bruner, 1915
- Copiphora capito Stål, 1874
- Copiphora cephalotes Saussure & Pictet, 1898
- Copiphora cochleata Redtenbacher, 1891
- Copiphora colombiae Hebard, 1927
- Copiphora cornuta De Geer, 1773
- Copiphora coronata Redtenbacher, 1891
- Copiphora cultricornis Pictet, 1888
- Copiphora festae Giglio-Tos, 1898
- Copiphora flavoscripta Walker, 1869
- Copiphora gorgonensis Montealegre-Z. & Postles, 2010
- Copiphora gracilis Scudder, 1869
- Copiphora hastata Naskrecki, 2000
- Copiphora longicauda Serville, 1831: type species (locality Cayenne, French Guiana)
- Copiphora monoceros Saussure & Pictet, 1898
- Copiphora mucronata Thomas, 1872
- Copiphora ottei Naskrecki, 2000
- Copiphora producta Bolívar, 1903
- Copiphora rhinoceros Pictet, 1888 - rhinoceros katydid
- Copiphora steinbachi Bruner, 1915
- Copiphora subulata Stoll, 1813
- Copiphora vigorosa Sarria-S., Buxton, Jonsson & Montealegre-Z., 2016
