= Belocephalus sabalis =

Scientific classification
- Domain: Eukaryota
- Kingdom: Animalia
- Phylum: Arthropoda
- Class: Insecta
- Order: Orthoptera
- Suborder: Ensifera
- Family: Tettigoniidae
- Genus: Belocephalus
- Species: B. sabalis

Binomial name
- Belocephalus sabalis Davis, 1912

Species of insect

Belocephalus sabalis, the palmetto conehead, is a species of conehead in the family Tettigoniidae. It is found in North America.
