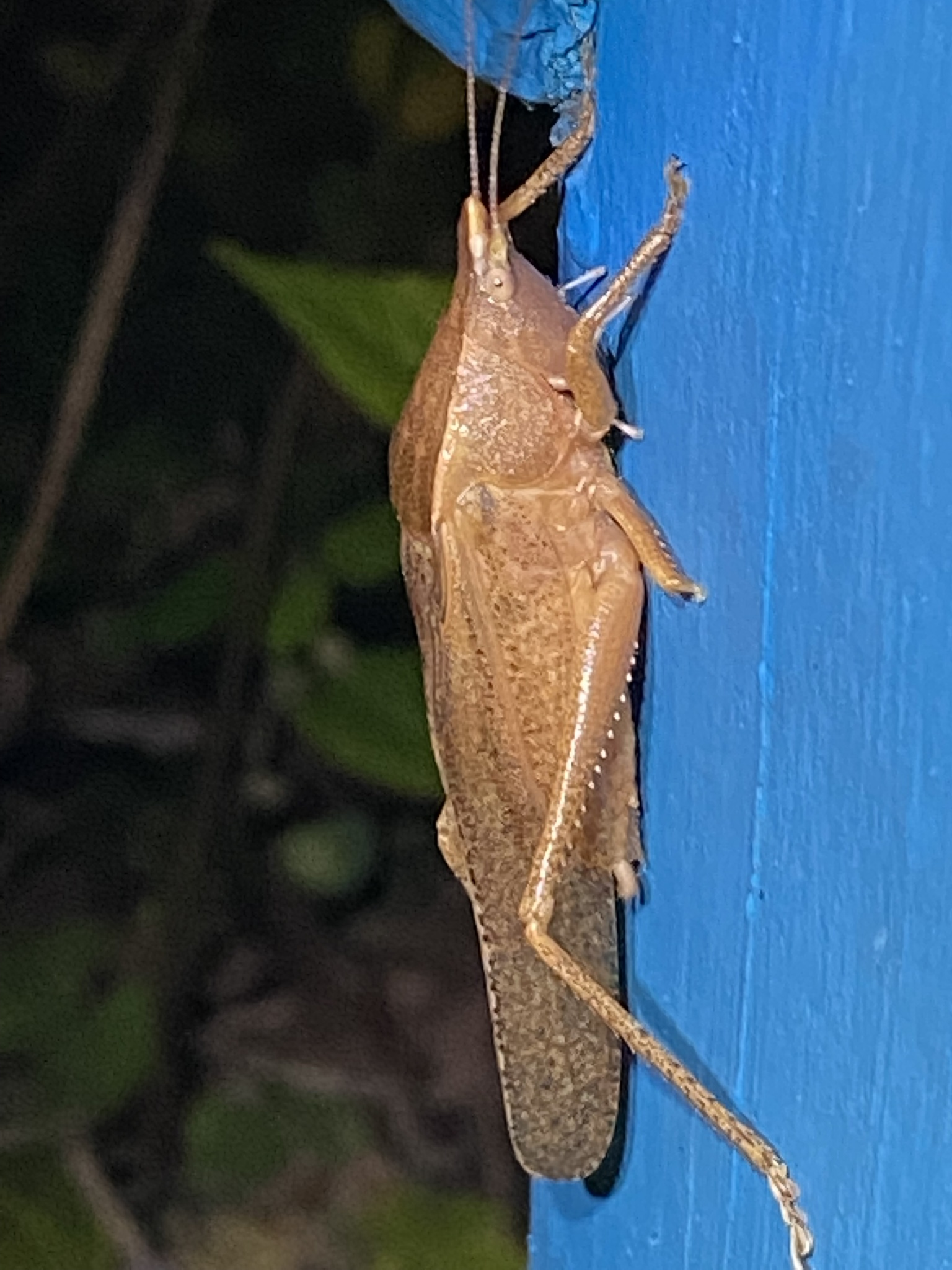
- Pyrgocorypha uncinata

Scientific classification
- Kingdom: Animalia
- Phylum: Arthropoda
- Clade: Pancrustacea
- Class: Insecta
- Order: Orthoptera
- Suborder: Ensifera
- Family: Tettigoniidae
- Subfamily: Conocephalinae
- Tribe: Copiphorini
- Genus: Pyrgocorypha; Stal, 1873

= Pyrgocorypha =

Genus of cricket-like animals

Pyrgocorypha is a genus of coneheads in the family Tettigoniidae. There are about 16 described species in Pyrgocorypha, found in the Americas, southern and eastern Asia.

== Species ==
These 16 species belong to the genus Pyrgocorypha:

- Pyrgocorypha annulatus (Karny, 1907)^{c g}
- Pyrgocorypha formosana Matsumura, S. & Shiraki, 1908^{c g}
- Pyrgocorypha gracilis Liu, Xian-wei, 1997^{c g}
- Pyrgocorypha hamata (Scudder, S.H., 1878)^{c g}
- Pyrgocorypha mutica Karny, 1907^{c g}
- Pyrgocorypha nigridens (Burmeister, H., 1838)^{c g}
- Pyrgocorypha parva Liu, Xian-wei, 2012^{c g}
- Pyrgocorypha philippina Hebard, 1922^{c g}
- Pyrgocorypha planispina (Haan, 1843)^{c g}
- Pyrgocorypha rogersi Saussure & Pictet, 1898^{c g}
- Pyrgocorypha sallei (Saussure, 1859)^{c g}
- Pyrgocorypha shirakii Karny, 1907^{c g}
- Pyrgocorypha sikkimensis (Karny, 1907)^{c g}
- Pyrgocorypha subulata (Thunberg, 1815)^{c g}
- Pyrgocorypha uncinata (Harris, 1841)^{i c g b} (hook-faced conehead)
- Pyrgocorypha velutina Redtenbacher, 1891^{c g}

Data sources: i = ITIS, c = Catalogue of Life, g = GBIF, b = Bugguide.net
