= Belocephalus sleighti =

Conservation status
- Vulnerable (IUCN 2.3)

Scientific classification
- Kingdom: Animalia
- Phylum: Arthropoda
- Class: Insecta
- Order: Orthoptera
- Suborder: Ensifera
- Family: Tettigoniidae
- Genus: Belocephalus
- Species: B. sleighti

Binomial name
- Belocephalus sleighti Davis, 1914

Species of cricket-like animal

Belocephalus sleighti, known as the Keys short-winged conehead katydid, is a species of katydid that is endemic to the United States.
