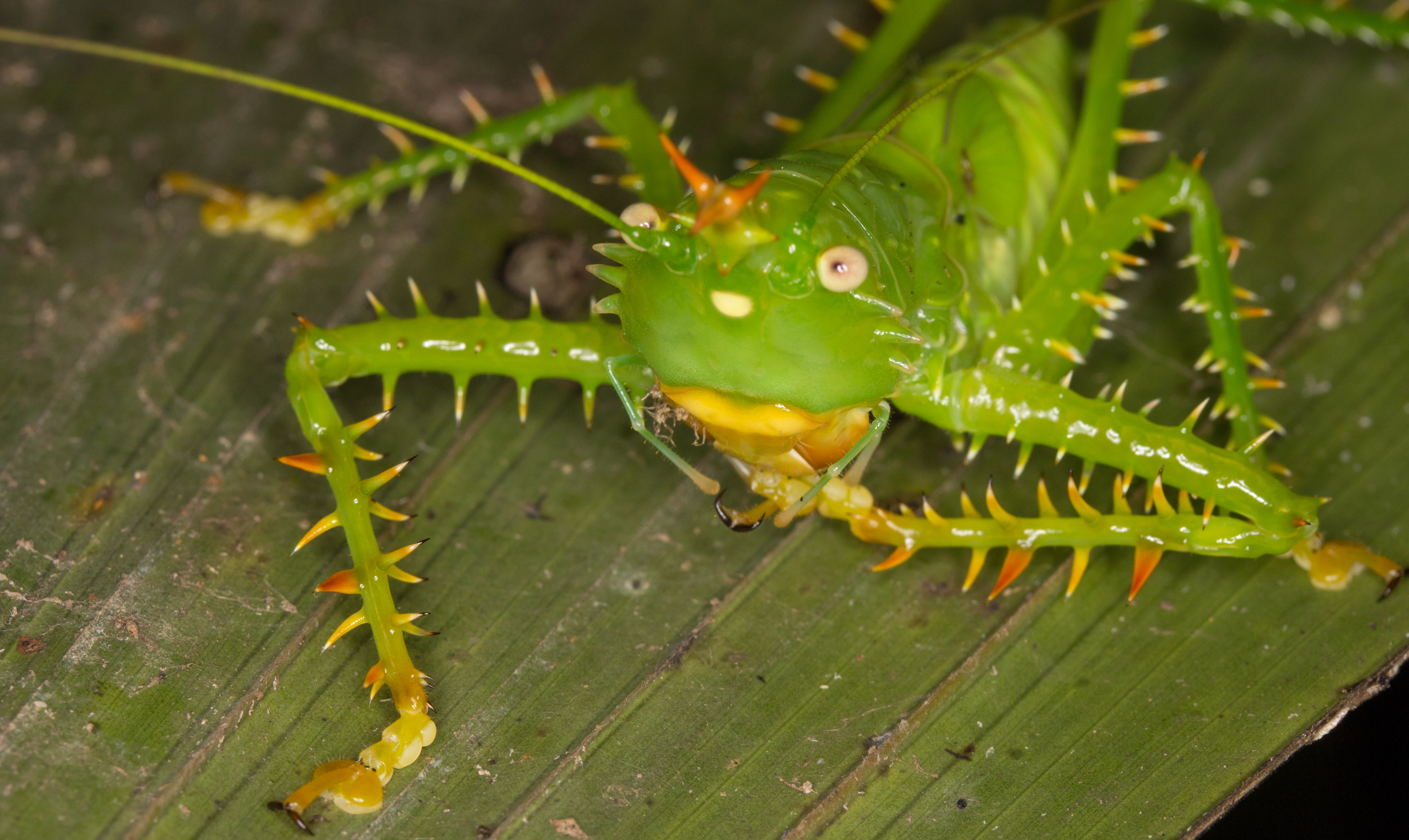

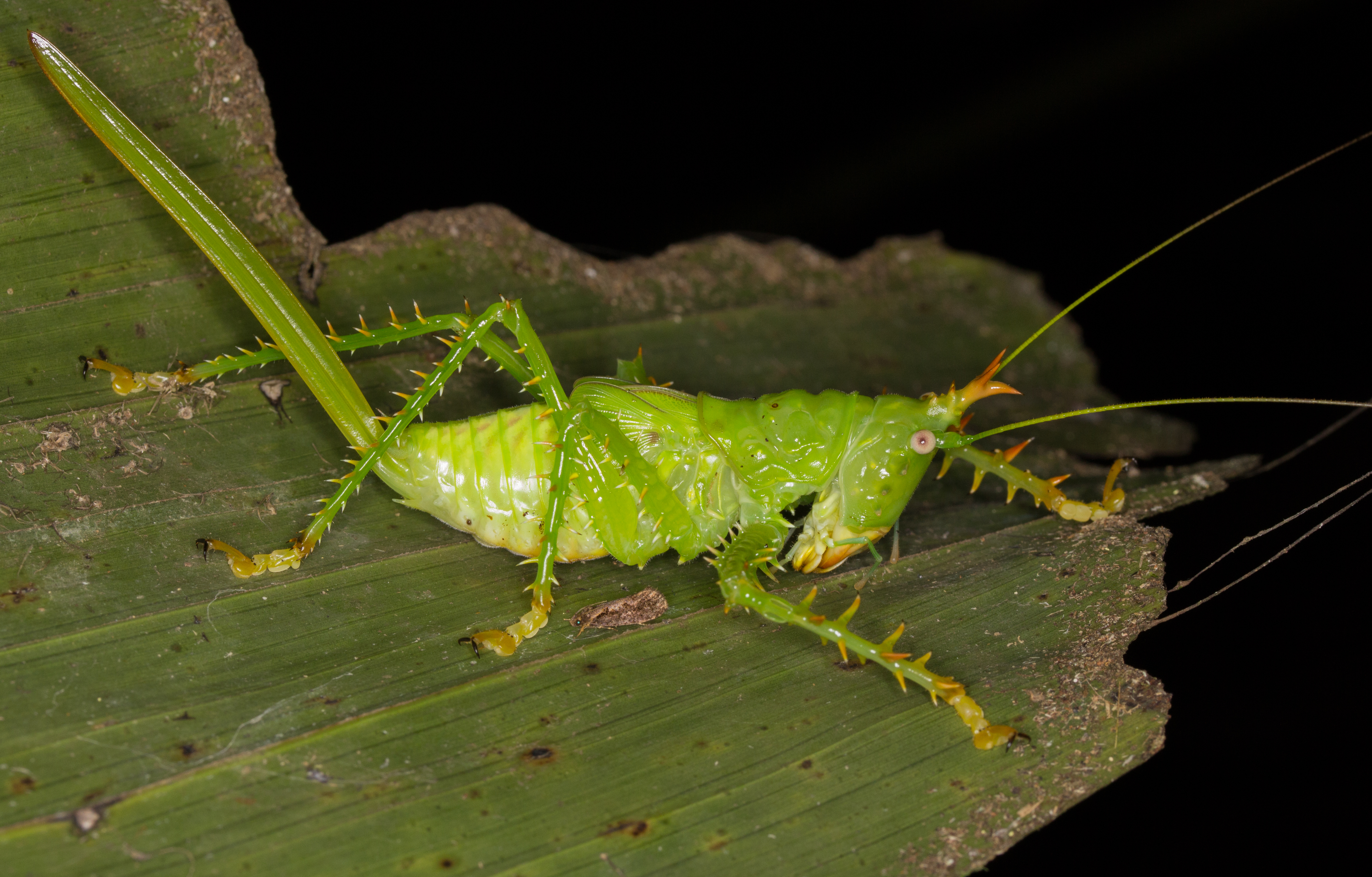
- Female Panacanthus cuspidatus in the Amazon, Ecuador

Scientific classification
- Domain: Eukaryota
- Kingdom: Animalia
- Phylum: Arthropoda
- Class: Insecta
- Order: Orthoptera
- Suborder: Ensifera
- Family: Tettigoniidae
- Subfamily: Conocephalinae
- Tribe: Copiphorini
- Genus: Panacanthus; Walker, 1869

Synonyms
- Martinezia Bolívar, 1881; Storniza Walker, 1869

= Panacanthus =

Genus of katydids

Panacanthus is a genus of conehead katydids found in forests in northwestern South America (western Brazil, Colombia, Ecuador and northern Peru) and Panama, including the western Amazon, the Chocó and the Magdalena River Valley. The common names spiny-headed katydid, spine-headed katydids, spike-headed katydids, thorny devil katydid, thorny devil bush cricket, and similar variations of the sort, do not apply to a single species or to this genus alone, and multiple species are often called by the same common name.

Panacanthus are omnivorous but with strong predatory tendencies. These nocturnal katydids are spiny with a horn-like projection on the top of the head and generally have a head-and-body length of about 2.5–7 cm (1.0–2.8 in), excluding the female's ovipositor. The ovipositor is long, about 4–6.5 cm (1.6–2.6 in), but the relative size varies depending on species; in some it is shorter than the head-and-body and in some it is longer. The genus includes both very poorly known and seemingly highly localized species and more widespread species that can be locally abundant. They have loud voices that vary depending on species.

== Phylogeny ==
Panacanthus includes the following extant species:

1. Panacanthus cuspidatus (Bolívar, 1881)
2. Panacanthus gibbosus Montealegre-Z. & Morris, 2004
3. Panacanthus intensus Montealegre-Z. & Morris, 2004
4. Panacanthus lacrimans Montealegre-Z. & Morris, 2004
5. Panacanthus pallicornis (Walker, 1869)
6. Panacanthus spinosus Redtenbacher, 1891
7. Panacanthus varius Walker, 1869 - type species

== Description ==
Panacanthus species have six spiny legs that they use for defense. The legs help fight off enemies and trap prey. They are able to camouflage among the leafy tropical trees because of their unique green color. Even though they do not have teeth, they are able to shred flesh with the bite of their sharp mouth parts.
