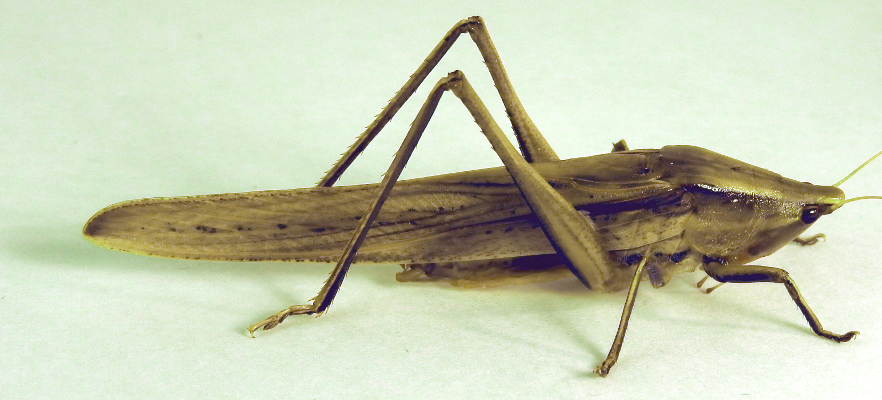

Scientific classification
- Kingdom: Animalia
- Phylum: Arthropoda
- Clade: Pancrustacea
- Class: Insecta
- Order: Orthoptera
- Suborder: Ensifera
- Family: Tettigoniidae
- Genus: Neoconocephalus
- Species: N. triops

Binomial name
- Neoconocephalus triops (Linnaeus, 1758)

Audio

= Neoconocephalus triops =

Species of katydid in the family Tettiigoniidae from the Caribbean and North America

Neoconocephalus triops, the broad-tipped conehead, is a species of katydid in the family Tettigoniidae. It is found in the Caribbean and North America.

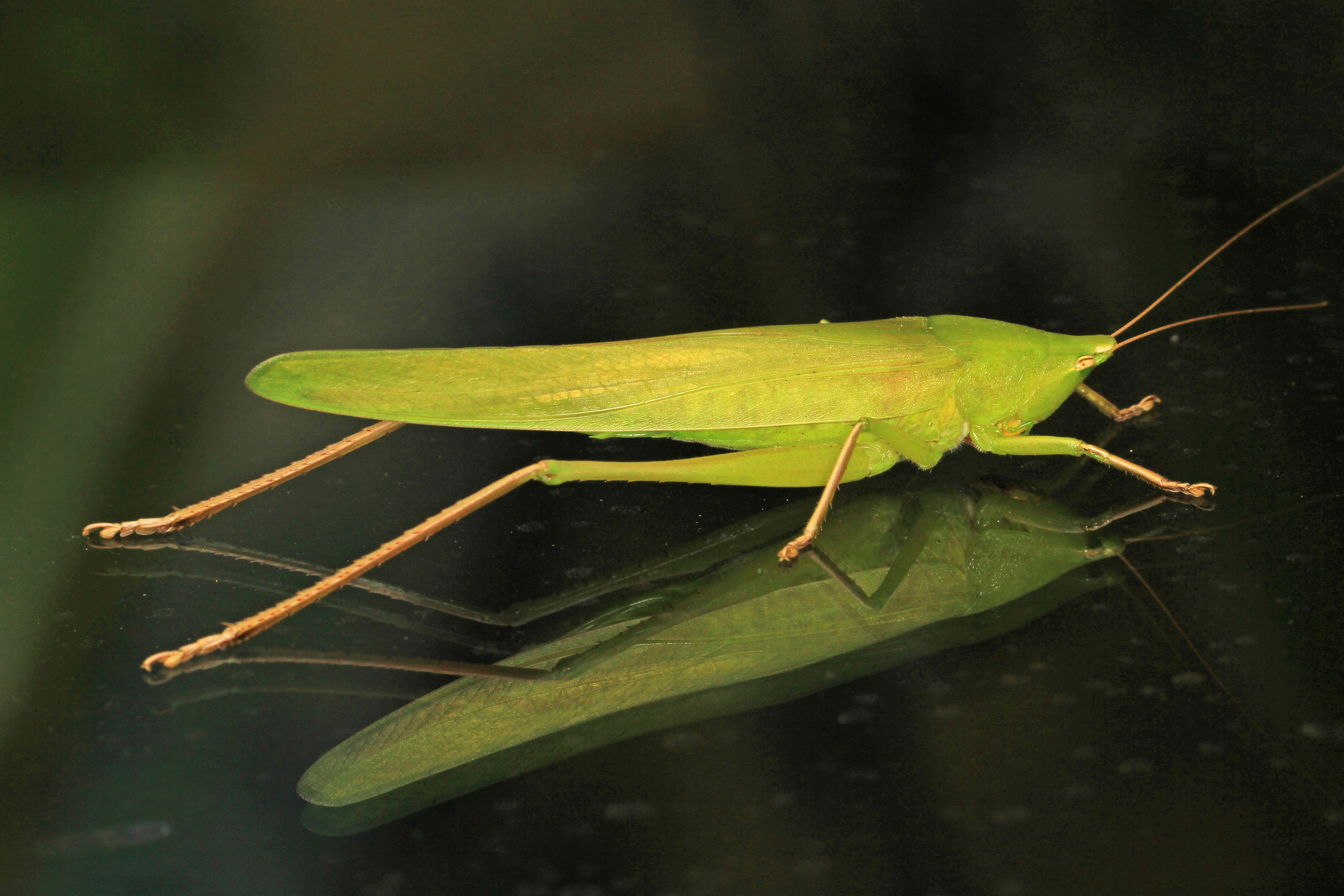
Broad-tipped conehead, Neoconocephalus triops
