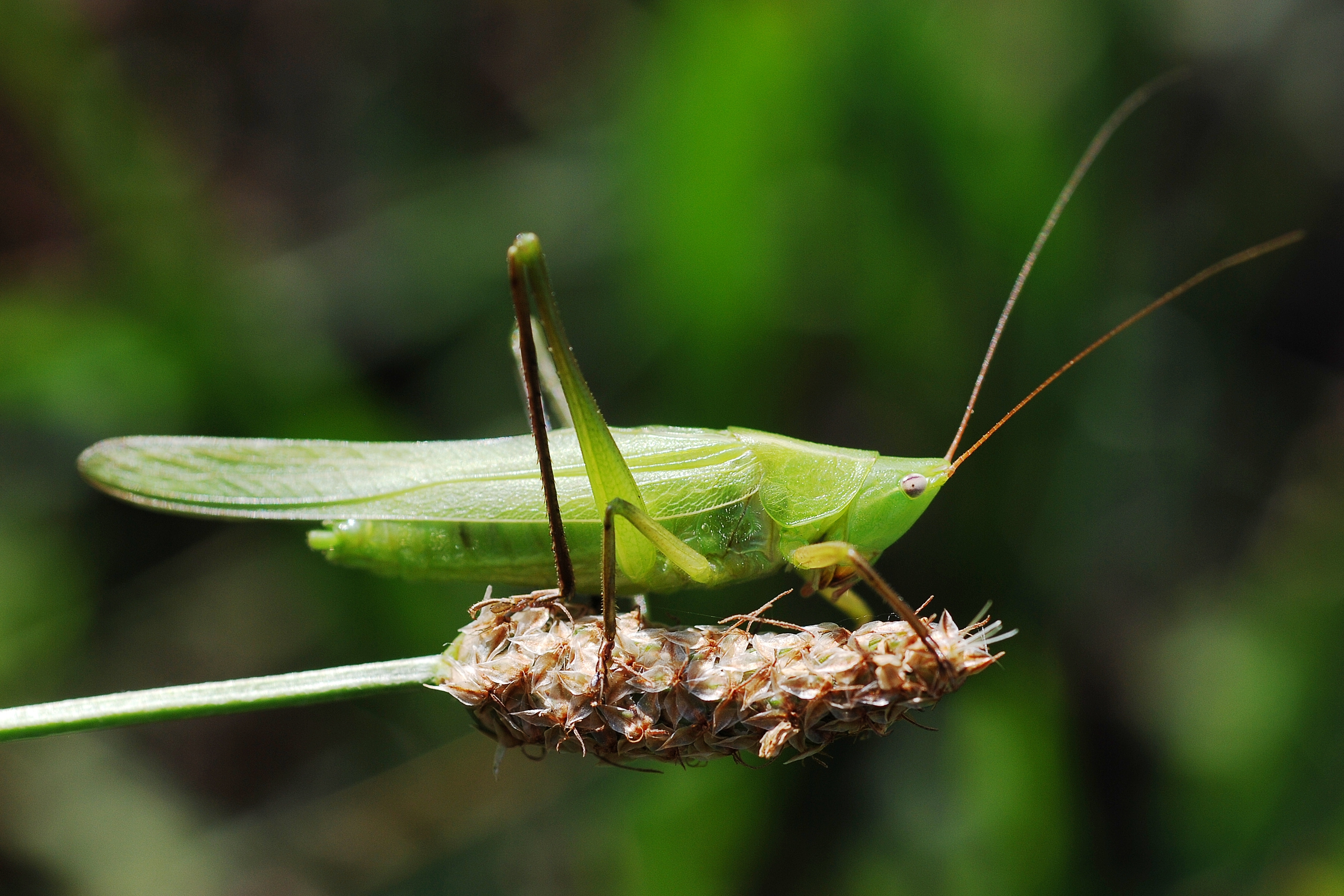

Scientific classification
- Kingdom: Animalia
- Phylum: Arthropoda
- Clade: Pancrustacea
- Class: Insecta
- Order: Orthoptera
- Suborder: Ensifera
- Family: Tettigoniidae
- Genus: Ruspolia
- Species: R. nitidula

Binomial name
- Ruspolia nitidula (Scopoli, 1786)

= Ruspolia nitidula =

Species of cricket

Close-Up of a Ruspolia nitidula

Ruspolia nitidula, the large conehead, is a species of bush cricket belonging to the subfamily Conocephalinae of the family Tettigoniidae. It is found throughout Europe, Africa, and the Palearctic part of Asia. A vernacular name that has been used is "cone-headed grasshopper", although it is not a grasshopper, but rather a bush cricket.

== Description ==
The species is green, large, and slender with a cone-shaped head. The apex of the head has a cream-colored band that goes through it and the eyes. Its size ranges from 32–60 mm (1.3–2.4 in). The wings of both sexes extend further than the abdomen. They are able to produce a high-pitched buzzing sound.

== Habitat ==
It is native to central and southern Europe where it can be found on riverbanks and other wet areas that have long grass. The species has been expanding northwards in Europe in recent decades. Populations have been established in southern Britain. The species can be found from July to October. It is also native to Africa and the Palearctic part of Asia.

== Edibility ==
The cricket is commonly eaten in Uganda and the sale of them brings in a large amount of income. The price per unit weight is periodically higher than that of beef in Uganda markets. During the 1990s, coffee prices dropped, resulting in the loss of many citizens' primary income. The price of these bush crickets helped regain income during that decade, but the crickets had a short shelf life and would bite when removed from storage. It is also commonly eaten by many East African tribes.

A 2016 study by Food Science & Nutrition concluded that the cricket is considered nutritious and that sautéing them results in a better aroma and flavor. In Uganda, they are cooked by either sautéing, deep frying, or boiling and then they are dried. The cricket is either eaten at home or commercially in towns such as Kampala and Masaka.
