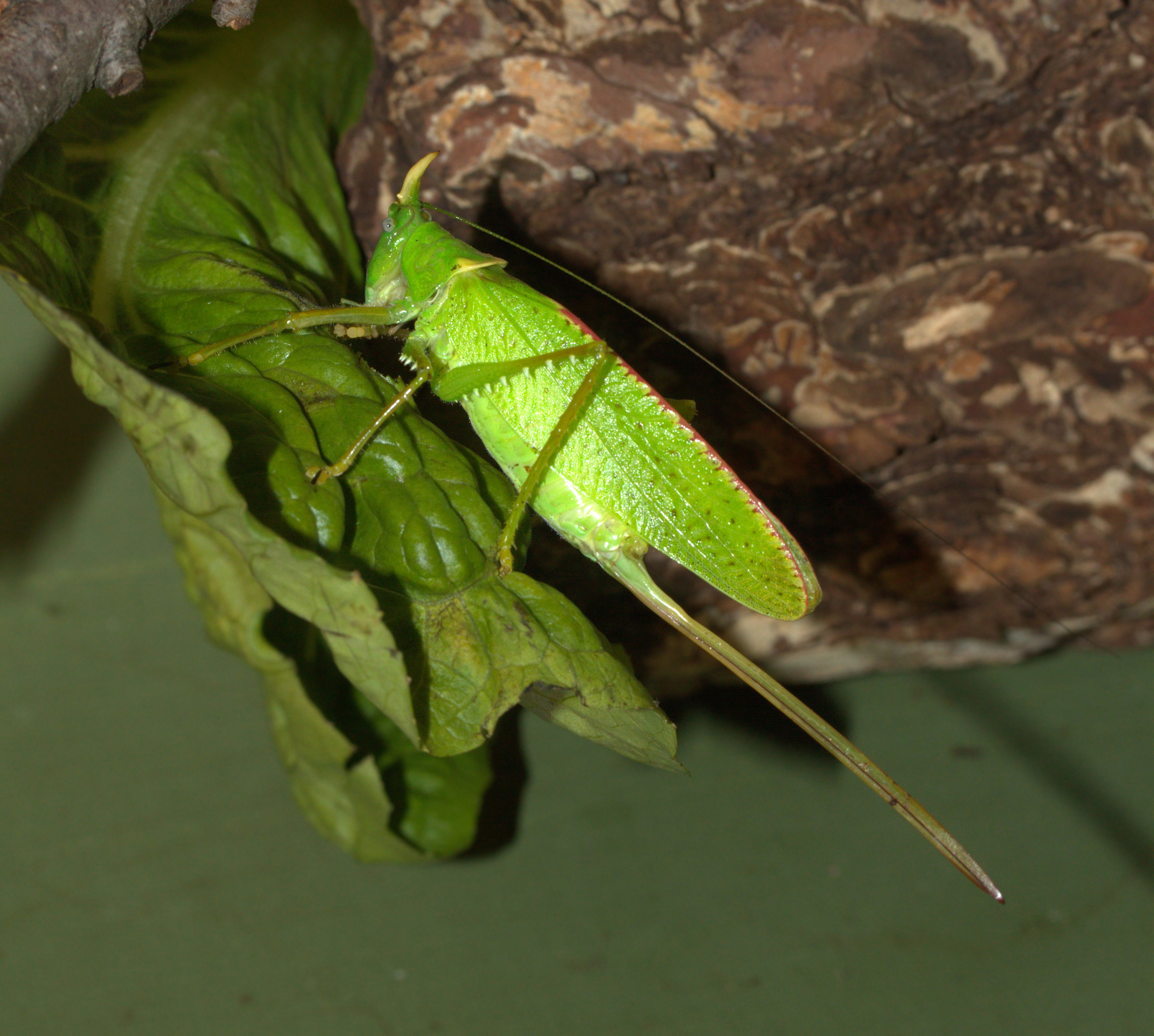

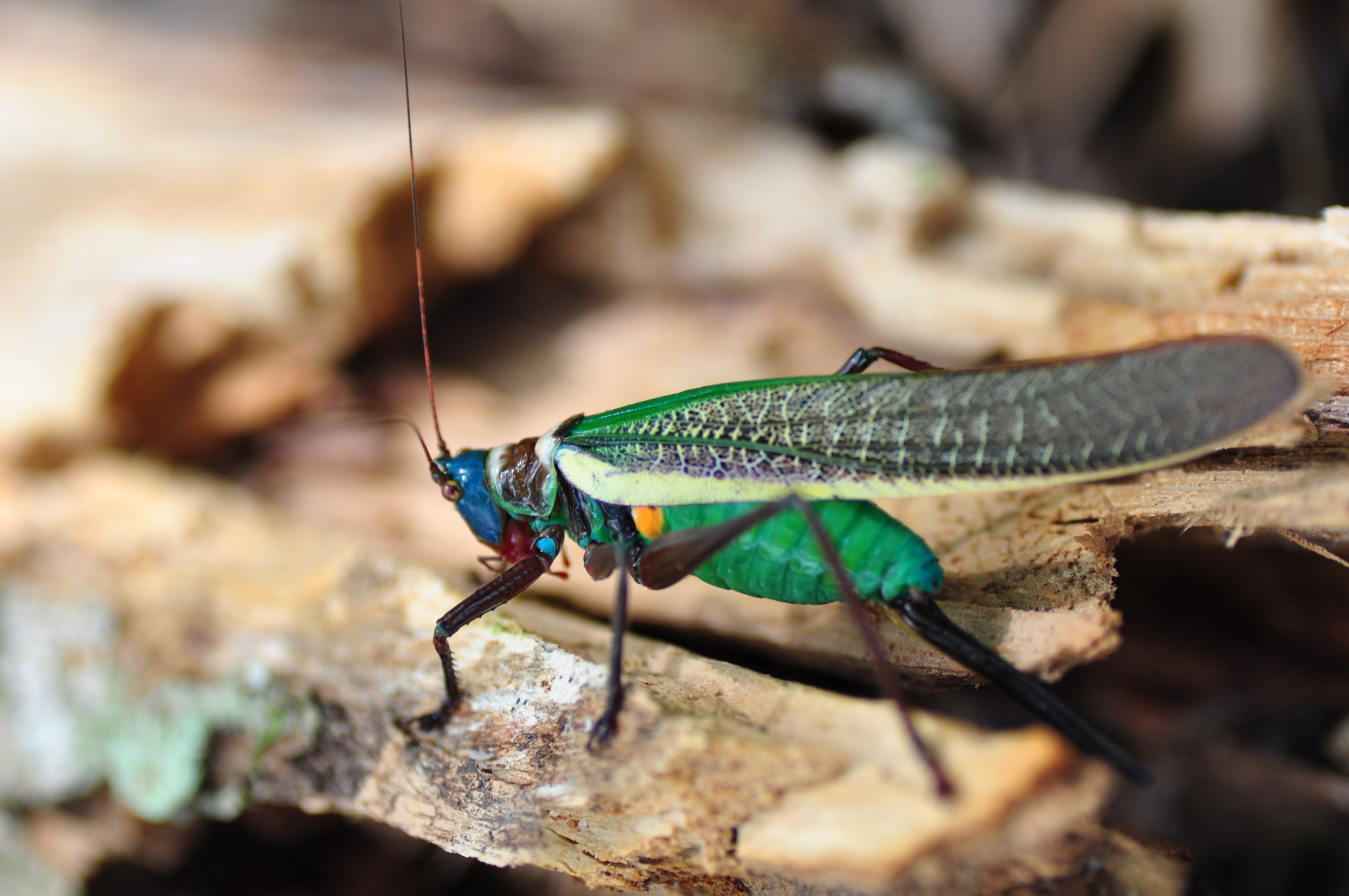
- Copiphora rhinoceros above, Moncheca pretiosa below (both females)

Scientific classification
- Kingdom: Animalia
- Phylum: Arthropoda
- Clade: Pancrustacea
- Class: Insecta
- Order: Orthoptera
- Suborder: Ensifera
- Family: Tettigoniidae
- Subfamily: Conocephalinae
- Tribe: Copiphorini; Karny 1912

= Copiphorini =

Tribe of insects

The Copiphorini are a tribe of bush crickets or katydids in the family Tettigoniidae. Previously considered a subfamily (the Copiphorinae), they are now placed in the subfamily Conocephalinae. Like some other members of Conocephalinae, they are known as coneheads, grasshopper-like insects with an extended, cone-shaped projection on their heads that juts forward in front of the base of the antennae.

== Description ==
Species in the tribe Copiphorini vary in length from about 24 to 74 mm (1 to 3 in). In most species, the female is considerably larger than the male, and in some, the largest male is smaller than the smallest female. Like other members of the cricket suborder Ensifera, they differ from grasshoppers (suborder Caelifera) in having filamentous antennae that are longer than their bodies. Most species have loud songs which enable them to be identified. The call is made in most instances by the two fore wings rubbing together. Some species can hear with the aid of hearing organs in the tibia segments of their legs. The ovipositor is straight and slender and bears no teeth.

== Genera ==
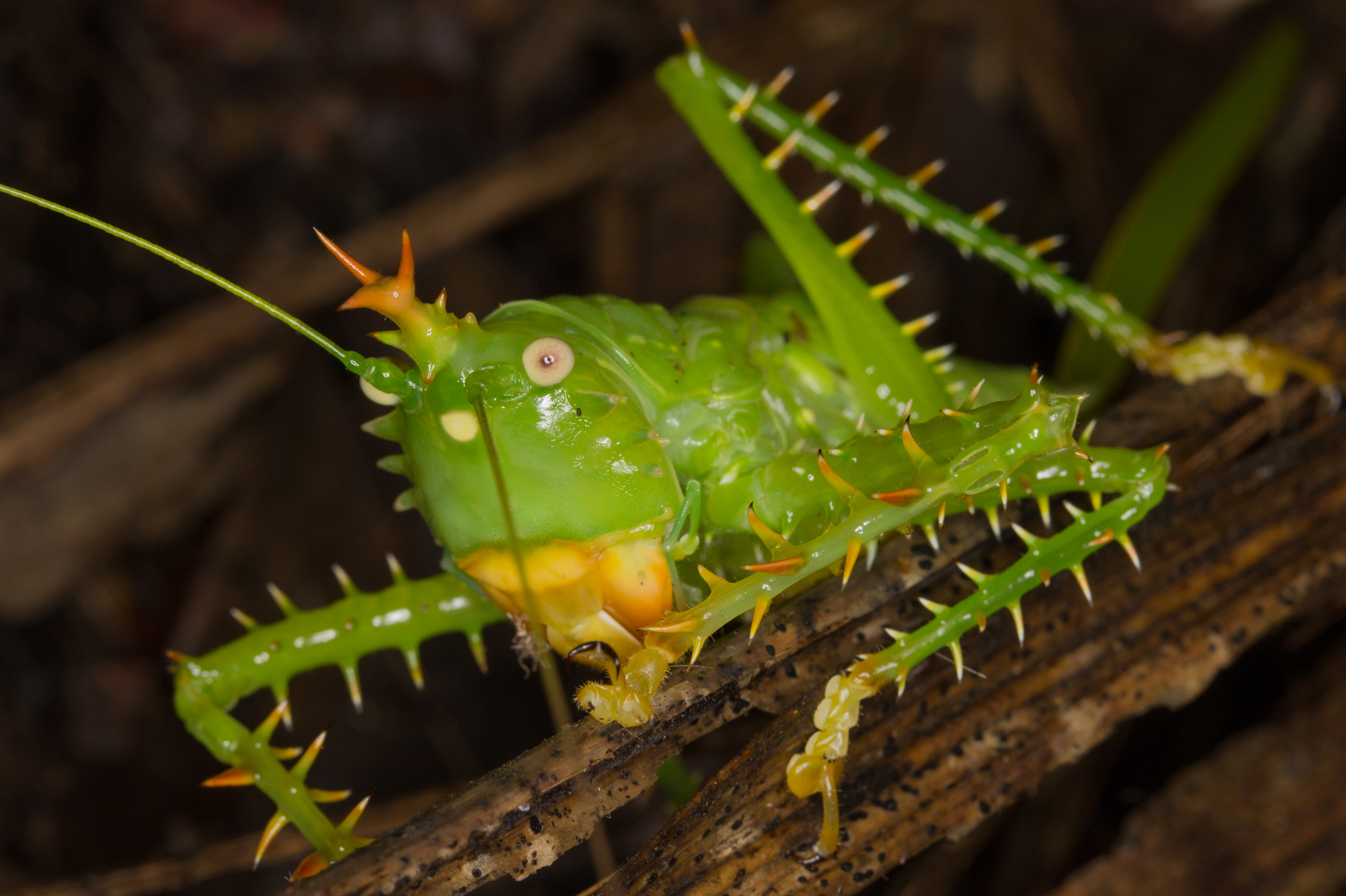
Panacanthus cuspidatus is a relatively large and spiny species from the western Amazon

As of September 2026, the Orthoptera Species File includes the following:

1. Acantheremus Karny, 1907
2. Anacaona Yong, 2019
3. Apoecides Bolívar, 1914
4. Artiotonus Montealegre-Z., Morris, Sarria-S. & Mason, 2011
5. Banza Walker, 1870
6. Belocephalus Scudder, 1875
7. Borinquenula Walker & Gurney, 1972
8. Brachycaulopsis Fontana, Mariño-Pérez & Woller, 2013
9. Bucrates Burmeister, 1838
10. Caetitus Antunes, Chamorro-Rengifo & Takiya, 2018
11. Caulopsis Redtenbacher, 1891
12. Clasma Karsch, 1893
13. Conocephaloides Perkins, 1899
14. Copiphora Serville, 1831
15. Coryphodes Redtenbacher, 1891
16. Daedalellus Uvarov, 1940
17. Dorycoryphus Redtenbacher, 1891
18. Erioloides Hebard, 1927
19. Eriolus Bolívar, 1888
20. Eucaulopsis Hebard, 1931
21. Euconocephalus Karny, 1907
22. Eurymetopa Redtenbacher, 1891
23. Gryporhynchium Uvarov, 1940
24. Lamniceps Bolívar, 1903
25. Lanista Bolívar, 1890
26. Lanistoides Sjöstedt, 1913
27. Liostethus Redtenbacher, 1891
28. Lirometopum Scudder, 1875
29. Loboscelis Redtenbacher, 1891
30. Mayacephalus Cadena-Castañeda, Monzón-Sierra & Cortés-Torres, 2016
31. Melanophoxus Karny, 1907
32. Metacaputus Naskrecki, 2000
33. Moncheca Walker, 1869
34. Montesa Walker, 1869
35. Mygalopsis Redtenbacher, 1891
36. Neoconocephalus Karny, 1907
37. Oxyprora Stål, 1873
38. Panacanthus Walker, 1869
39. Parabucrates Scudder, 1897
40. Paroxyprora Karny, 1907
41. Parvarhynchus Farooqi & Usmani, 2020
42. Pedinostethus Redtenbacher, 1891
43. Phaneracra Uvarov, 1936
44. Phoxacris Karny, 1907
45. Plastocorypha Karsch, 1896
46. Pluviasilva Naskrecki, 2000
47. Poascirtus Saussure, 1899
48. Podacanthophorus Naskrecki, 2000
49. Pseudorhynchus Serville, 1838
50. Pyrgocorypha Stål, 1873
51. Rombophora Yong, 2019
52. Ruspolia Schulthess, 1898
53. Santandera Koçak & Kemal, 2008
54. Sphodrophoxus Hebard, 1924
55. Toledopizia Chamorro-Rengifo & Braun, 2010
56. Unicorniella Yong, 2019
57. Vestria Stål, 1874
58. Xestophrys Redtenbacher, 1891
