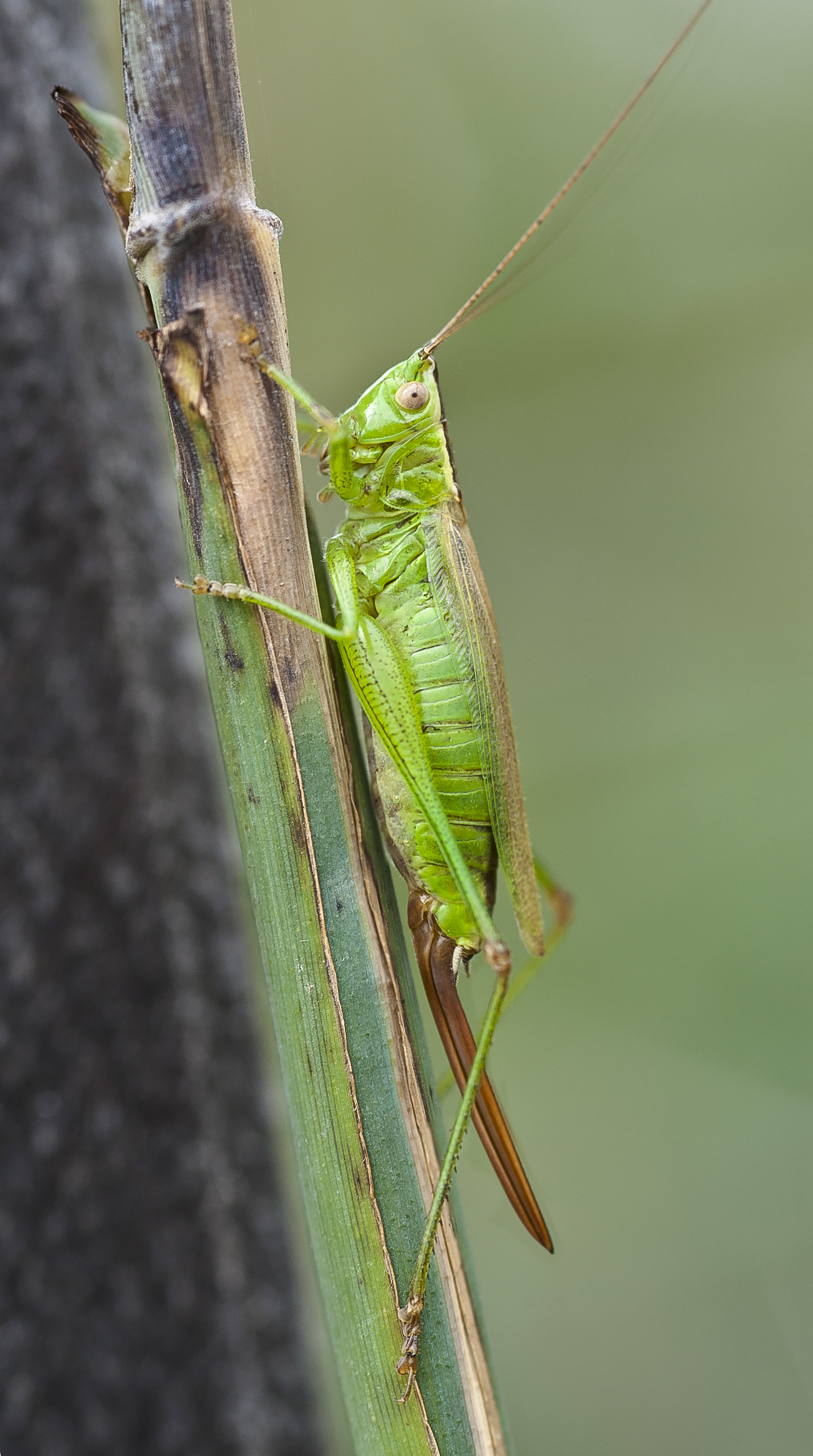

Scientific classification
- Domain: Eukaryota
- Kingdom: Animalia
- Phylum: Arthropoda
- Class: Insecta
- Order: Orthoptera
- Suborder: Ensifera
- Family: Tettigoniidae
- Genus: Conocephalus
- Subgenus: Anisoptera
- Species: C. fuscus

Binomial name
- Conocephalus fuscus (Fabricius, 1793)

Synonyms
- Conocephalus dilatatus Ramme, 1951; Conocephalus discolor (Thunberg, 1815); Conocephalus fuscus fuscus (Fabricius, 1793); Conocephalus fuscus turanicus Semenov, 1916; Xiphidium concolor Bolívar, I., 1876-1878; Xiphidion discolor discolor (Thunberg, 1815); Xiphidion fuscum (Fabricius, 1793); Xyphidium ponticus Nedelkov, 1907; Xiphidium thoracicum Fischer von Waldheim, 1846; Locusta fusca Fabricius, 1793

= Conocephalus fuscus =

Species of cricket-like animal

Conocephalus fuscus, the long-winged conehead, is a member of the family Tettigoniidae, the bush-crickets and is distributed through much of Europe and temperate Asia. This bush-cricket is native to the British Isles where it may confused with the short-winged conehead (Conocephalus dorsalis). These two species are phenotypically similar; however, the distinguishing factor between the two is the fully developed set of wings the long-winged conehead possesses that allows for flight. In the short-winged coneheads the hind wings are shorter than the abdomen, causing the wings to be vestigial and the species is incapable of flight. For this reason it is hard to discriminate between the two species during the early stages of their life cycle before the wings have fully developed. The colouration of the conehead is typically a grass green with a distinctive brown stripe down its back, though there are some brown phenotypes.

== Scientific name ==
Some authorities, following H. Radclyffe Roberts (1941), hold that this species should be referred to as Conocephalus discolor (Thunberg, 1815). The debate hinges on whether the specific epithet used by Fabricius in the combination Locusta fusca should be regarded as preoccupied by the naming of a species by Pallas in 1773 as "GRYLLUS Locusta fuscus" (this species is now known as Arcyptera fusca). Coray & Lehmann (1998) refute this on several grounds, most tellingly that Pallas and Fabricius are referring to two different nominal genera for which the name Locusta had been proposed - Pallas refers to Locusta Linnaeus, 1758 (type species the migratory locust), and Fabricius to Locusta Geoffroy, 1762 (type species the great green bush-cricket). The apparent homonymy is therefore to be disregarded and C. fuscus is the correct valid name. There are, however, still abundant references to C. discolor in modern literature, as well as to C. fuscus.

== Description ==
The body of bush-crickets is covered by a protective exoskeleton and is divided into three parts: the head, thorax, and abdomen. The topmost segment of the thorax, the pronotum, is shaped like a saddle and is primarily used for protection. Bush-crickets are also equipped with large hind legs for jumping and biting mouth parts for grip and protection. The phenotypic aspects that are characteristic to this family of insects are the antennae, which typically exceed the length of their body, and the straight sword shaped ovipositor that the females use for laying eggs.

The body of C. fuscus is 16–22 millimetres (0.63–0.87 in) when it reaches maturity. Its hind wings are longer than its forewings, and they both reach beyond the tip of the abdomen. A distinctive dorsal stripe runs down the thorax, covering its head and pronotum, which is 12–17 millimetres (0.47–0.67 in) long. Adults have a slender grass-green body, brown wings, brown ovipositor, a reddish-brown abdomen, and a dark-brown stripe that edges white near the thorax. Nymphs differ slightly in colouration with a light-green body and a white-margined black stripe.

C. fuscus is a wing polymorphic species. Most wing-dimorphic tettigoniids have a brachypterous (short-winged) form and a macropterous (long-winged) form. However, since C. fuscus is already considered a long winged species, its alternative form is extra long winged, with wing lengths up to a third longer than normal individuals. An experiment performed by Ando and Hartley in 1982 on the embryonic development of this species provided evidence that the tendency for an individual to develop as one wing morph or the other is dependent on the density of the population. In this species the development of individuals with extra long wings is induced by crowding.

Wing dimorphism does not only affect wing length, but also affects flight, dispersal, and reproductive capability of this species. The juvenile hormone is responsible for wing polymorphism in orthoptera and has also been known to play a role in the trade-off between wing morphology and reproductive capability.

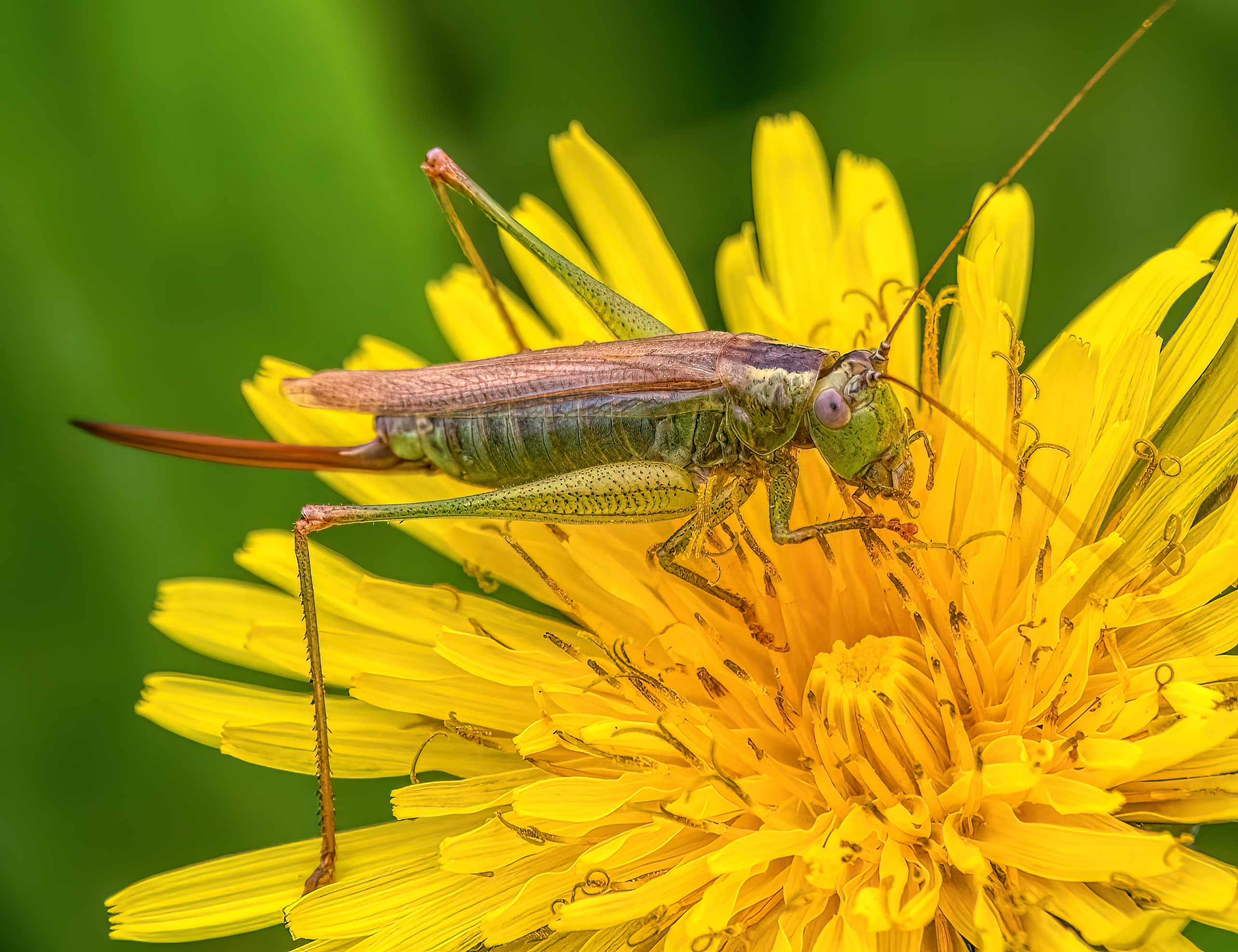
Long winged conehead cricket.

== Distribution and habitat ==
C. fuscus can be found in parts of France, Italy, and the Netherlands, but it has made is biggest appearance in the United Kingdom. When the species was first discovered in Britain in the 1940s it was confined to the South Coast but in the 1980s there was dramatic population growth and its range expanded more than 150 miles in 20 years. Today the long-winged conehead can be found in northwestern parts of the country beyond the River Thames and as far west as Wales.

The increase in the global climate over the past few decades has had a significant impact on the spread of this species. The northward range expansion coincides with the worldwide increase in temperature due to the greenhouse effect. Universally, species respond to fluctuations in climate by increasing or contracting their breeding ranges. If the opportunity arises for a species to expand its realised niche due to favourable conditions that have become available, it is advantageous for them to do so. In the 1950s the climate began to cool in the northern hemisphere, causing longer winters in southern Europe. This kept the long-winged coneheads in the southern part of the UK, where they were first sited, for a period of time. In 1975 the effects of the greenhouse gases began to neutralise the cooling effects from the previous decades, and as the climate in the United Kingdom slowly rose, the long-winged coneheads started to increase the limits of their range farther northward. However, the major expansion did not occur until 1980 when global warming caused a significant increase in temperature in the northern hemisphere. Since 1980 the temperature has risen linearly by 0.13 °C or 0.23 °F ± 0.03 °C or 0.05 °F per decade and the greatest impact fell between 40°N and 70°N latitude. This latitudinal region includes the United Kingdom and southern Europe, which explains why the long-wing conehead, and other European fauna, has responded most readily to the warming climate and expanded its range.

Another factor propagating this expansion is the presence of extra long-winged individuals within the species. The populations found farther north, at the range borders, have a higher percentage of extra long-winged (macropterous) individuals in comparison to populations in range core. Ando and Hartley (1982) found the macropters to be more active and capable of sustained flight. The long-winged individuals would engage flight for short periods of time if disturbed but would more readily seek cover. Simmons and Thomas (2004) also found that there was a difference in flight capability between the range populations. Individuals in border populations were able to fly up to four times longer (16.7 km or 10.4 mi ± 2.3 km or 1.4 mi) than those in the core (4.2 km or 2.6 mi ± 0.8 km or 0.50 mi). This suggests that there may be genetic differences between the two range populations and that the effect density on the formation of one phenotype or another is a plastic response; however, this evidence is not definitive. It is clear that macropterous individuals have a selective advantage due to their capability for sustained flight, allowing them to form new colonies and benefit from habitats that have opened up farther north.

This expansion is beneficial for the species as well as the individuals within the species. As the species expands its range as a whole the individuals can take advantage of the unclaimed territory, which previously had an unsuitable climate. The individuals that now inhabit the area do not have to compete for resources such as food and shelter, and therefore can put more time and energy into ensuring the reproductive success of their offspring and the prorogation of their own genes. This is especially beneficial for the extra long-winged individuals who experience a reproductive trade off with wing morphology.

Conocephalus fuscus shares the same habitat as many species of bush-crickets. It makes its home in grassy meadows, woodlands, dry heaths, and among course vegetation. They can also be found living near water in reed beds, marshes, or bogs. This species prefers areas with a warm climate, as evident by their recent northern dispersal due to the increase in global climate.

== Feeding ==
This species is omnivorous, though its diet is mostly vegetarian. The long-winged conehead feeds primarily on grasses as well as small invertebrates such as aphids and caterpillars.

== Behaviour and reproduction ==
Conocephalus fuscus is active during the day, and their main form of locomotion is walking. However, they use their large hind legs for jumping when under threat of predation.

=== Song ===
Sound of Conocephalus fuscus
Field recording in the Netherlands 29s

Conocephalus fuscus singing. This video has been slowed down by a factor of 4, in order to make the singing sound audible to humans.

The males in this species stridulate, rubbing their forewings over each other, creating enough friction to produce a "song". This song, also known as a calling song, is the male's way of attracting conspecific females to mate with. The song of the long-winged can be heard between frequencies of 8 kHz to 19 kHz and from a distance of 4–5 metres (13–16 ft) from the source. The song consists of trisyllabic echeme, a first-order assemblage of syllables, each with a short opening hemisyllable followed by a longer closing hemisyllable. The hemisyllables are the sounds produced by the upward (opening) and downward (closing) stroke of the forewings. The first two syllables are between 15 ms and 16 ms while the third lasts about 25 ms while the opening hemisyllable of the first syllable is very strong and distinctive and that of the third syllable is quiet and soft. These different aspects come together to make a distinct song that can overall be described as a soft sizzling sound.

Like many behaviours, there are costs and benefits to the calling song. Mating calls are beneficial to the individuals because their song attracts females that they can potentially mate with. However, songs can also signal predators and alert them of the male's presence and presents a risk to his life. Though male stridulation can lead to death, long-winged conehead males continue to produce their song because the benefits of attracting a female outweigh the costs of being eaten. It is within the individuals best interest to maximise his reproductive success, including his ability to find a mate, and therefore this mating behaviour within the species.

=== Life cycle ===
Conocephalus fuscus has a univoltine life cycle, only producing one set of offspring per year. The females lay between their eggs in the stems of grasses in the late summer. They do this by first biting a hole into the stems of grasses or reeds and then insert their eggs using their ovipositors. The eggs develop over the winter months and the nymphs will begin to emerge in mid May and will reach adulthood between July and late October.

Experiments by Ando and Hartley (1982) and Simmons and Thomas (2004) show that there is a trade-off between wing morphology and reproductive ability. The macropterous individuals have an overall lower fecundity, or fertility, than the long-winged individuals. The length of a female depends on the extent of abdominal swelling due to the amount of eggs the individual is holding. The macropterous females were shorter in length than the long-winged morphs and therefore do not carry as many eggs. The number of eggs within the ovaries is the same between the two phenotypes; however, the number of eggs in production at any given time is significantly lower in extra long-winged individuals. Lowered fecundity in macropterous females is largely due to the fact that the pre-oviposition, the period between the emergence of an adult female and the start of her egg laying period, for these individuals is more than twice that of the long-winged morphs. Another cause is the lower oviposition rate that macropterous females experience during the first half of the egg-laying period which never allows them to catch up to the normal egg laying rate. The delay in maturation and lower egg production reduces the amount of extra weight on the insect allowing it to be capable of longer flight.

The dispersal and flight capability of macropterous individuals provides them with an increased chance of finding a new habitat and colonising a new territory, at the cost of reproductive ability. However this cost does not outweigh the benefit of relocating to an area that has plenty of space and resources. Therefore, more changes in distribution can be anticipated if the global climate continues to rise and areas farther north become suitable habitats for C. fuscus.
