= Clarence Erwin McClung =

American zoologist and cytologist

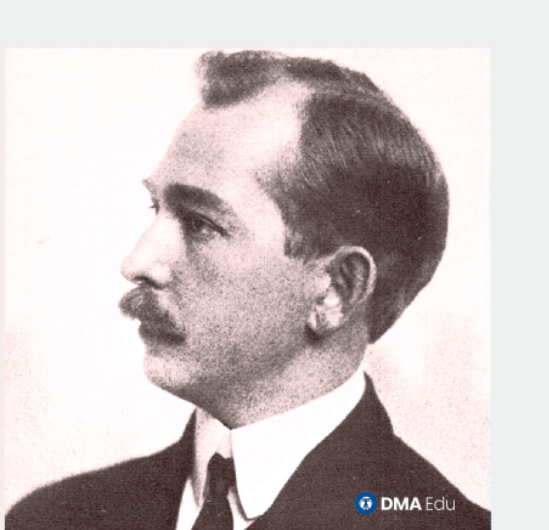
- Born: April 5, 1870; Clayton, California, US
- Died: January 17, 1946 (aged 75)
- Scientific career
- Fields: Zoology
- Notable students: Edward H. Taylor, William Rees Brebner Robertson, Walter Sutton

Clarence Erwin McClung (April 5, 1870 – January 17, 1946) was an eminent American zoologist and prairie pioneer cytologist who discovered the role of chromosomes in sex-determination.

Graduating pharmacy at the University of Kansas in 1892, after a year of teaching he entered the college as a graduate student (A.B.,1896, A.M.,1898, and Ph.D.,1902.) He studied one summer with W.M. Wheeler at the University of Chicago and at his suggestion, studied the spermatogenesis of Xiphidium fasciatum, a long-horned grasshopper; launching his scientific career in the research of chromosomes. McClung took advantage of the great abundance of grasshoppers in Kansas "to make them pivotal for cytological study and to found a school of grasshopper cytologists." Later, the use of Brachystola magna ("Lubber" grasshopper) for cytological studies would spread to laboratories throughout the world, as germ-cells in the testes were very large and easily studied. Development of the “McClung Model” research microscope and publication of the “Handbook of Microscopal Technique” demonstrated evidence of his commitment to improving the results of scientific research. Appointed Chairman of the Department of Zoology at the University of Kansas in 1901 and Director of the Zoology Laboratory at the University of Pennsylvania in 1912. He was elected to the American Philosophical Society in 1913 and the United States National Academy of Sciences in 1920. He served as Editor of the Journal of Morphology from 1920 until his retirement in 1940. In 1924, he was a founding member and first vice-president of the Pennsylvania Academy of Science. The University of Pennsylvania conferred upon him at its bicentennial year commencement exercises the honorary degree of Doctor of Science in 1940. He then spent a year as Acting Chairman of the Department of Zoology at the University of Illinois, and in 1943 was invited to become Acting Chairman of the Department of Biology at Swarthmore College. Ibid

He was a member of Episcopalian Church of the Messiah.
