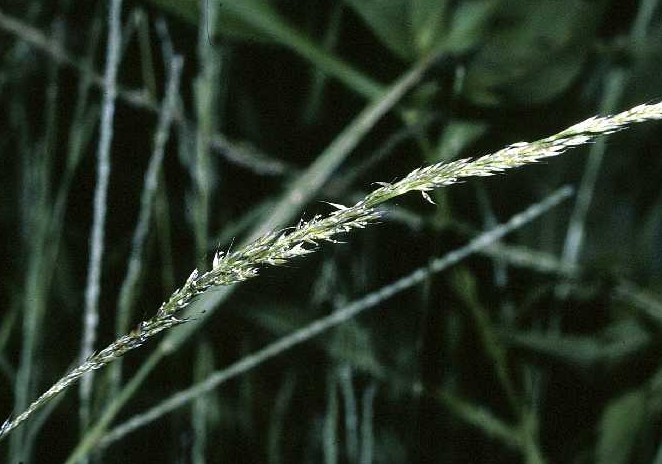

Conservation status
- Secure (NatureServe)

Scientific classification
- Kingdom: Plantae
- Clade: Tracheophytes
- Clade: Angiosperms
- Clade: Monocots
- Clade: Commelinids
- Order: Poales
- Family: Poaceae
- Subfamily: Chloridoideae
- Genus: Muhlenbergia
- Species: M. schreberi

Binomial name
- Muhlenbergia schreberi J.F.Gmel.

= Muhlenbergia schreberi =

Species of flowering plant

Muhlenbergia schreberi, commonly known as nimblewill or Schreiber's Muhly, is a perennial grass species in the family Poaceae native to the Americas.

== Description ==
Nimblewill is a grass preferring loamy soil, moist conditions, and partial sun, and is primarily found in disturbed areas. It grows to 9–18 inches tall, with purple to green culms that stand erect when young but bend along the ground upon maturity. Its leaves are hairless, green, flat or furrowed, and are up to 3.5 inches long and 5 mm wide. The leaves stick out horizontally from the plant. The root system is fibrous, and rootlets are formed at lower parts of the culm. Nimblewill reproduces and forms colonies via seeds and stolons, but not rhizomes. Its inflorescences are panicles that are greenish, shiny, and spike-like with appressed branches having three or more spikelets each. Its spikelets are about 2–8 inches long with each one having 1 to 2 glumes that are up to 0.2 mm long. The florets are pollinated by the wind; after pollination, spikelets separate from the plant and fall to the ground.

Nimblewill foliage and growth habit

== Ecology ==
This species is eaten by the bug Stenodema vicinum, and is also eaten by cattle and other hoofed herbivores. The seeds can be distributed by sticking to animal hoofs or shoes. Nimblewill is common around Illinois where it is native. Nimblewill is sometimes found around Minnesota. Some insects are known to eat nimblewill, like Hysteroneura setariae, Conocephalus brevipennis and Hymenarcys nervosa. Birds that are known to eat this plant are tree sparrows, song sparrows and turkeys.

== In horticulture ==
It is considered a southern turf type lawn grass and turns brown in the winter. This makes it a lesser grass for northern climate lawns. It is shade tolerant and tends to spread aggressively once established. Because of its durability in moderately cold temperatures, resistance to some arthropod and nematode pests, and competitiveness with undesired plants, this grass can be used to protect peach crops in the American southeast.
