= Conocephalus resacensis =

Scientific classification
- Domain: Eukaryota
- Kingdom: Animalia
- Phylum: Arthropoda
- Class: Insecta
- Order: Orthoptera
- Suborder: Ensifera
- Family: Tettigoniidae
- Genus: Conocephalus
- Subgenus: Anisoptera
- Species: C. resacensis

Binomial name
- Conocephalus resacensis Rehn & Hebard, 1915

Species of cricket-like animal

Conocephalus resacensis, the Brownsville meadow katydid, is a species of meadow katydid in the family Tettigoniidae. It is found in North America.
