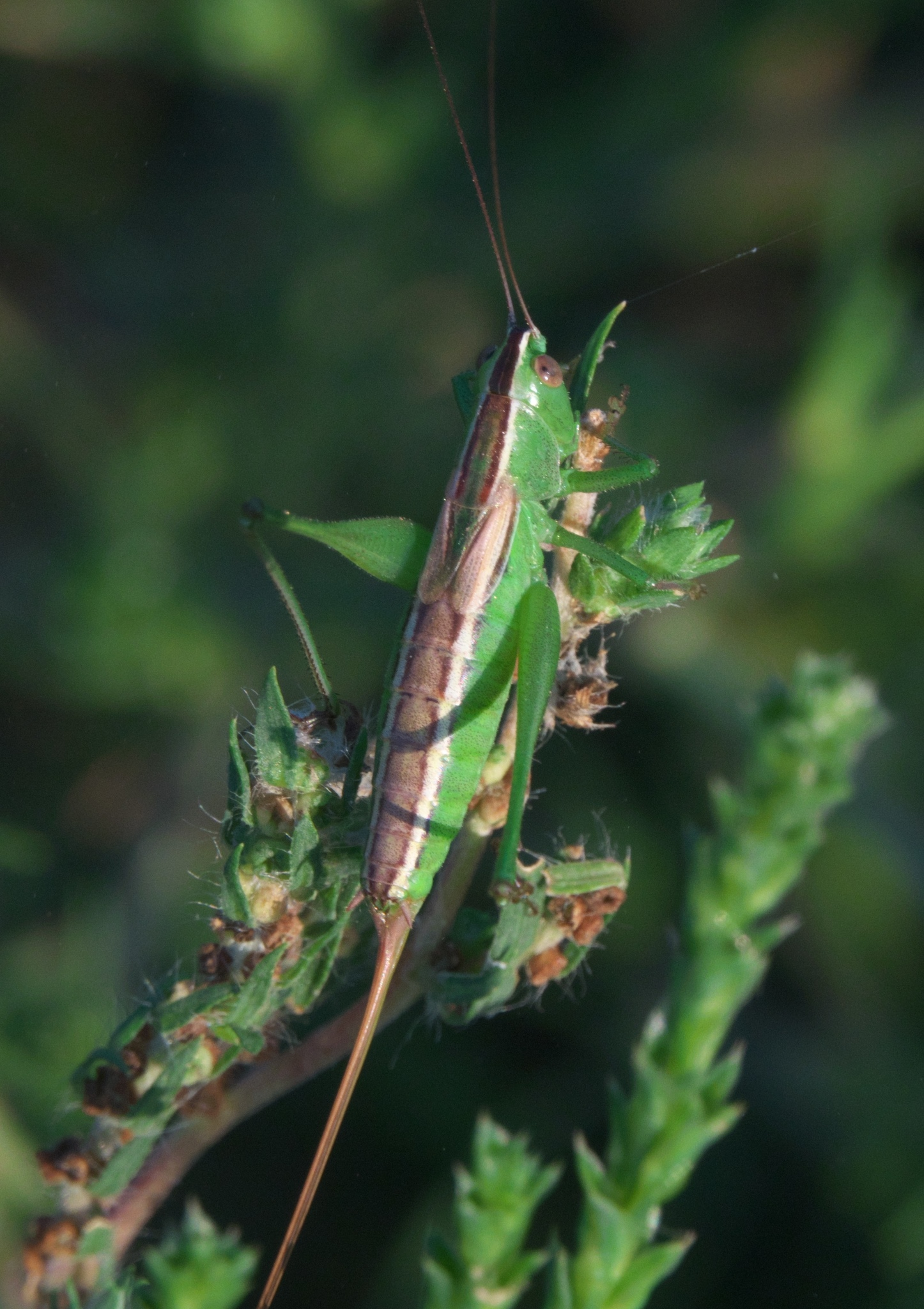
- Conocephalus saltans, Kansas

Scientific classification
- Domain: Eukaryota
- Kingdom: Animalia
- Phylum: Arthropoda
- Class: Insecta
- Order: Orthoptera
- Suborder: Ensifera
- Family: Tettigoniidae
- Genus: Conocephalus
- Subgenus: Conocephalus
- Species: C. saltans

Binomial name
- Conocephalus saltans (Scudder, 1872)

= Conocephalus saltans =

Species of cricket-like animal

Conocephalus saltans, known generally as prairie meadow katydid, is a species of meadow katydid in the family Tettigoniidae. Other common names include the western prairie grasshopper and wingless prairie grasshopper. It is found in North America.
