= Stenodema vicinum =

Scientific classification
- Kingdom: Animalia
- Phylum: Arthropoda
- Class: Insecta
- Order: Hemiptera
- Suborder: Heteroptera
- Family: Miridae
- Genus: Stenodema
- Species: S. vicinum

Binomial name
- Stenodema vicinum (Provancher, 1872)

Species of true bug

Stenodema vicinum is a species of true bug in the Miridae family that feeds on the grass blades of Muhlenbergia schreberi (nimblewill).

This species has been implicated in "silver top" damage to grass seed crops. This and other bugs of the Stenodema genus were found to feed on grass stems by puncturing the leaf sheaths.
