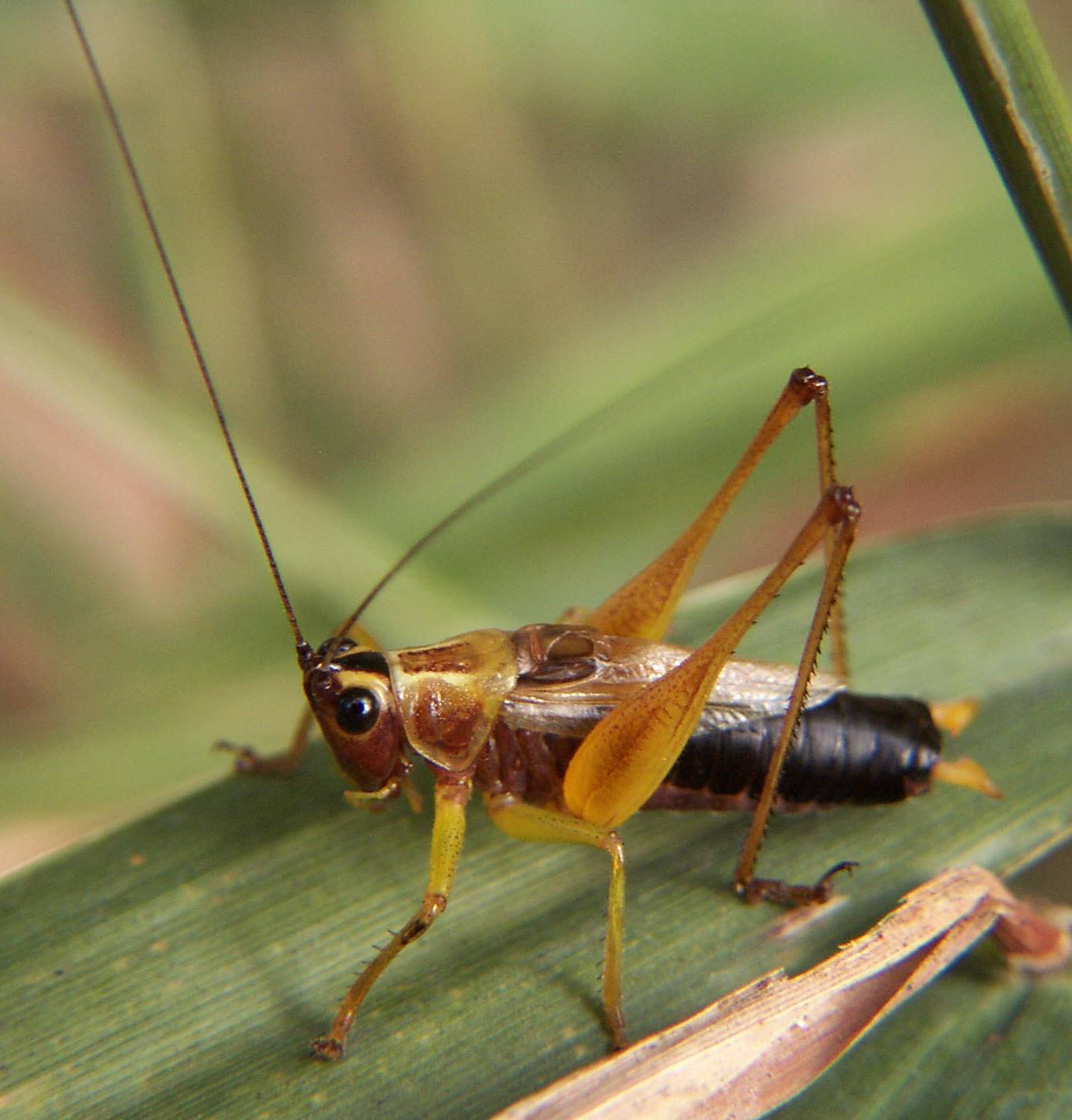

Scientific classification
- Domain: Eukaryota
- Kingdom: Animalia
- Phylum: Arthropoda
- Class: Insecta
- Order: Orthoptera
- Suborder: Ensifera
- Family: Tettigoniidae
- Genus: Conocephalus
- Subgenus: Anisoptera
- Species: C. nigropleurum

Binomial name
- Conocephalus nigropleurum (Bruner, 1891)

= Conocephalus nigropleurum =

Species of cricket-like animal

Conocephalus nigropleurum, the black-sided meadow katydid, is a species of meadow katydid in the family Tettigoniidae. It is found in North America.
