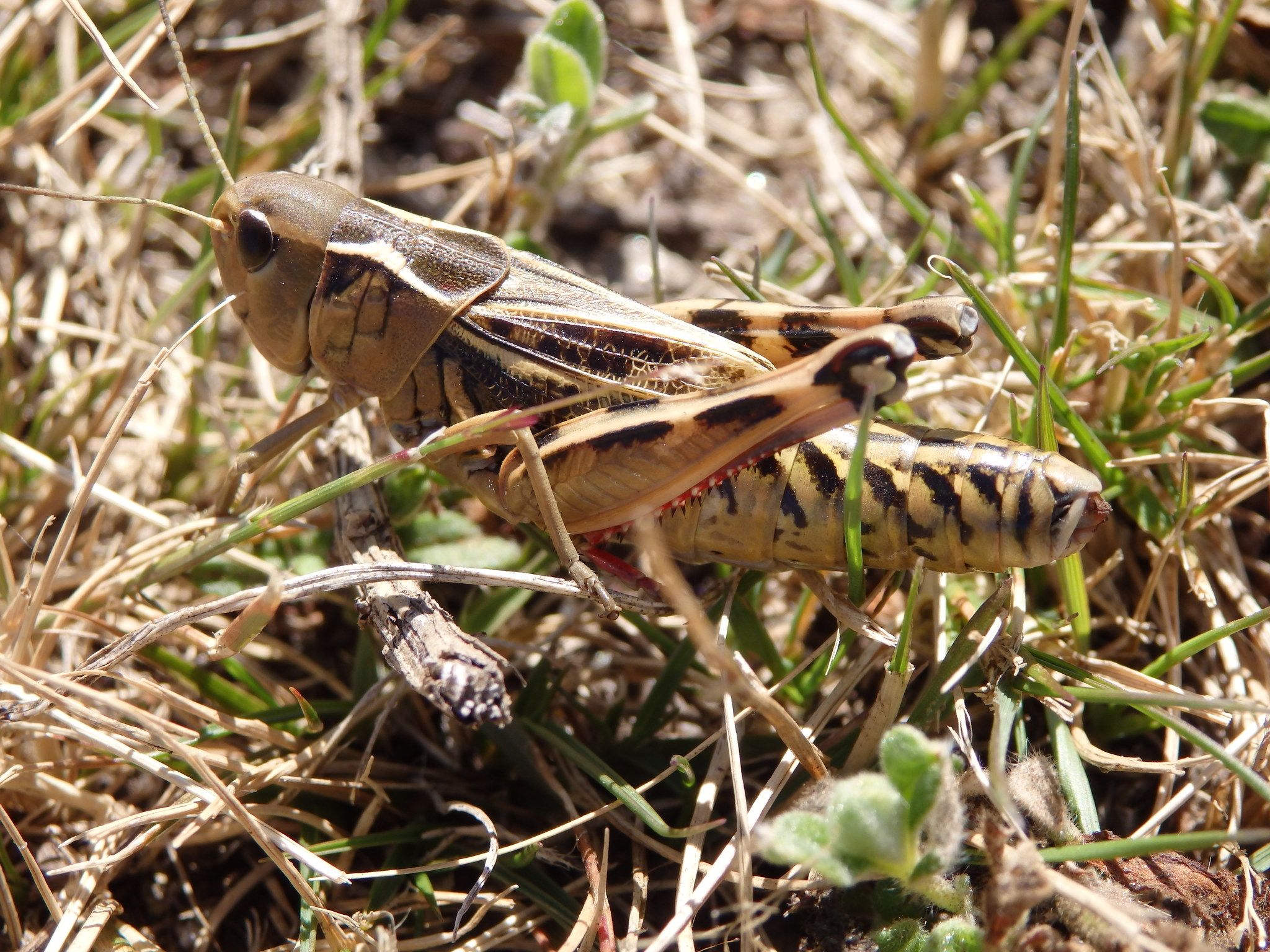
- Arcyptera tornosi, Iberian banded grasshopper, Portugal

Conservation status
- Least Concern (IUCN 3.1)

Scientific classification
- Domain: Eukaryota
- Kingdom: Animalia
- Phylum: Arthropoda
- Class: Insecta
- Order: Orthoptera
- Suborder: Caelifera
- Family: Acrididae
- Genus: Arcyptera
- Species: A. tornosi

Binomial name
- Arcyptera tornosi Bolívar, 1884

= Arcyptera tornosi =

Species of grasshopper

Arcyptera tornosi, the Iberian banded grasshopper, is a species of slant-faced grasshopper in the family Acrididae. It is found on the Iberian Peninsula.

The IUCN conservation status of Arcyptera tornosi is "LC", least concern, with no immediate threat to the species' survival. The IUCN status was assessed in 2016.
