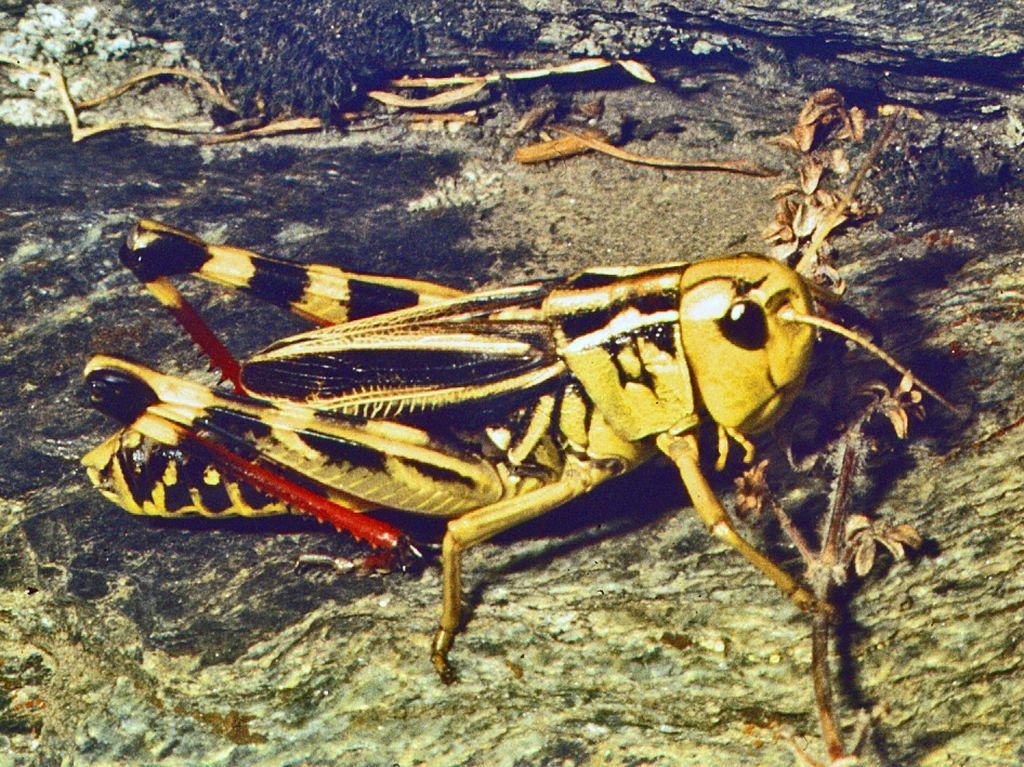
- Arcyptera fusca, female

Scientific classification
- Domain: Eukaryota
- Kingdom: Animalia
- Phylum: Arthropoda
- Class: Insecta
- Order: Orthoptera
- Suborder: Caelifera
- Family: Acrididae
- Tribe: Arcypterini
- Genus: Arcyptera; Serville, 1839

= Arcyptera =

Genus of grasshoppers

Arcyptera is a genus of grasshoppers belonging to the family Acrididae subfamily Gomphocerinae. These grasshoppers are present in mainland Europe, and in the eastern Palearctic realm through to northeastern Asia.

== Species ==
The Orthoptera Species File lists:

subgenus Arcyptera Serville, 1838

- Arcyptera albogeniculata Ikonnikov, 1911
- Arcyptera coreana Shiraki, 1930
- Arcyptera ecarinata Sjöstedt, 1933
- Arcyptera flavivittata Yin & Mo, 2009
- Arcyptera fusca (Pallas, 1773) - type species (as Gryllus fuscus Pallas)
- Arcyptera orientalis Storozhenko, 1988
- Arcyptera tornosi Bolívar, 1884

subgenus Pararcyptera Tarbinsky, 1930

- Arcyptera alzonai Capra, 1938
- Arcyptera brevipennis (Brunner von Wattenwyl, 1861)
- Arcyptera kheili Azam, 1900
- Arcyptera labiata (Brullé, 1832)
- Arcyptera mariae Navas, 1908
- Arcyptera maroccana Werner, F., 1929
- Arcyptera meridionalis Ikonnikov, 1911
- Arcyptera microptera (Fischer von Waldheim, 1833)
