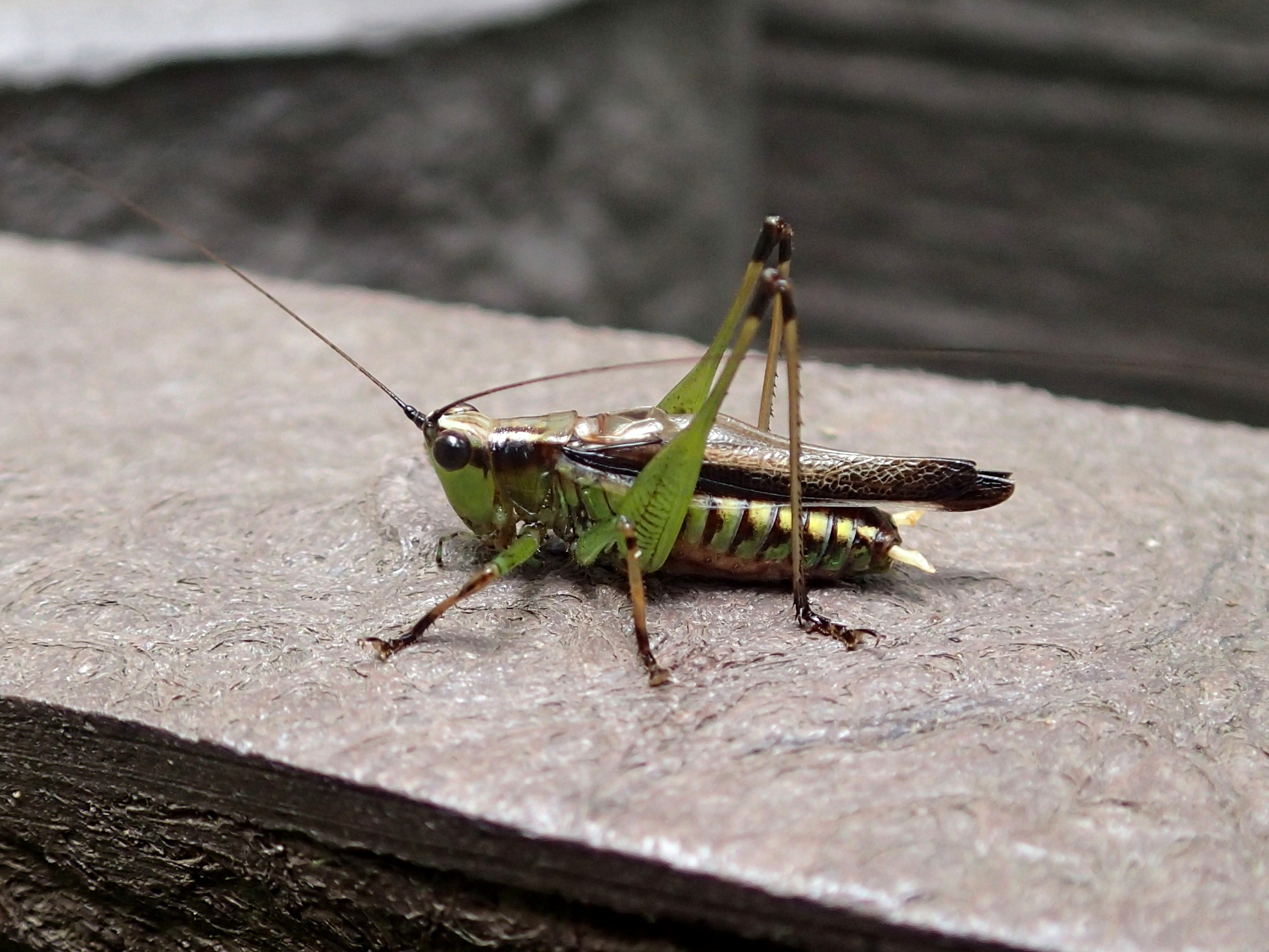
- Adult, male

Scientific classification
- Domain: Eukaryota
- Kingdom: Animalia
- Phylum: Arthropoda
- Class: Insecta
- Order: Orthoptera
- Suborder: Ensifera
- Family: Tettigoniidae
- Genus: Conocephalus
- Subgenus: Anisoptera
- Species: C. melaenus

Binomial name
- Conocephalus melaenus (De Haan, 1843)

Synonyms
- Locusta melaena Haan, 1843 (basionym); Xiphidium melaenum; Xiphidium nigro-geniculatum; Anisoptera melaenum; Xiphidium (Xiphidium) nigro-geniculatum (Redtenbacher, 1891); Xiphidion melan; Xiphidium melanum; Conocephalus melanum; Conocephalus melas

= Conocephalus melaenus =

Species of cricket-like animal

Conocephalus melaenus, sometimes known as the black-kneed conehead or black-kneed meadow katydid is a species of Tettigoniidae found in China, Taiwan, Japan, Nepal, India, Indo-China and western Malesia.

== Description ==
This medium-sized conehead has hind femora with knees darkened: which is diagnostic. The crimson-orange nymphs are quite noticeable in the grasses and shrubs where they develop.

== Gallery ==
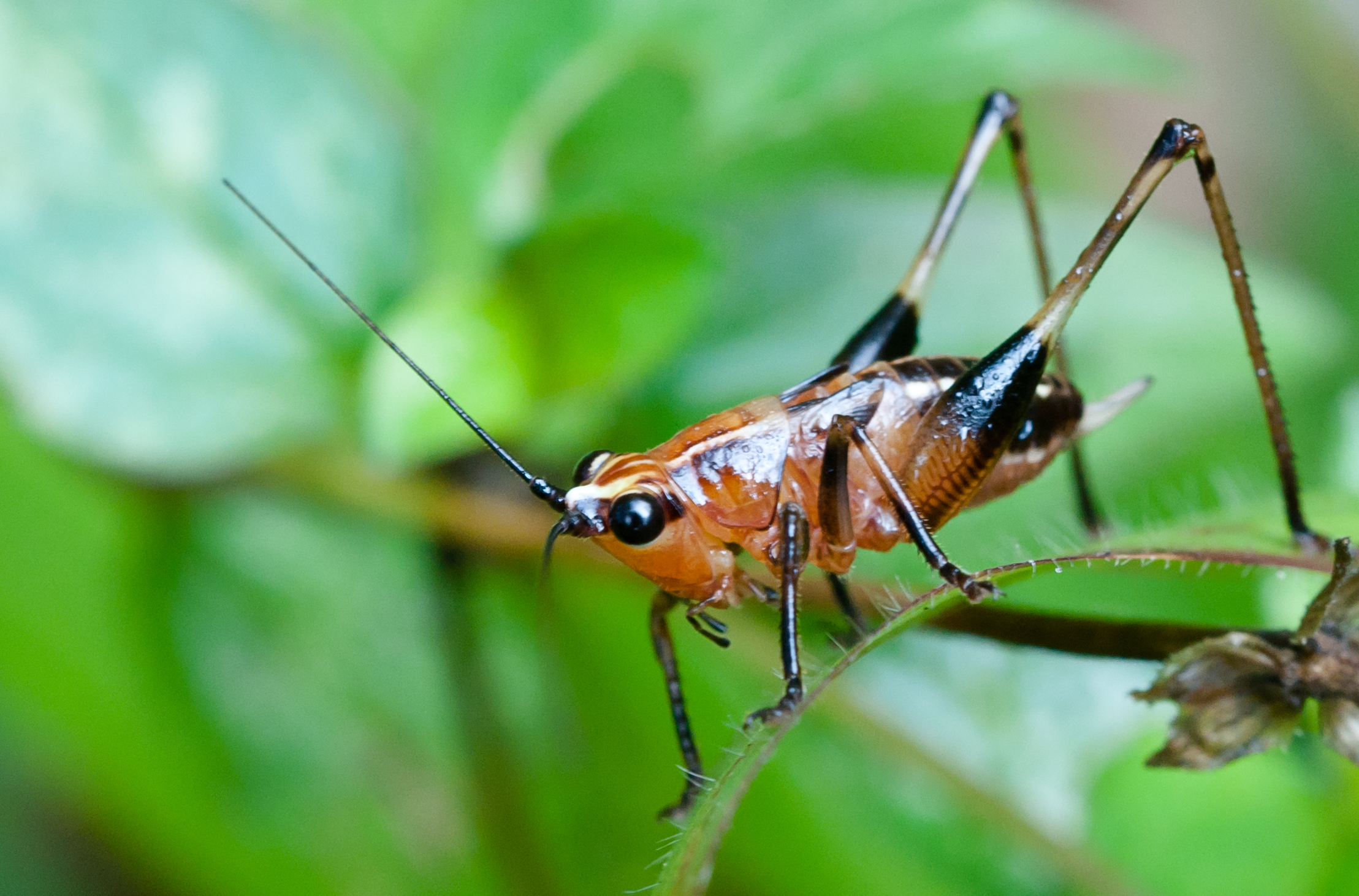
nymph - Khao Yai National Park, Thailand

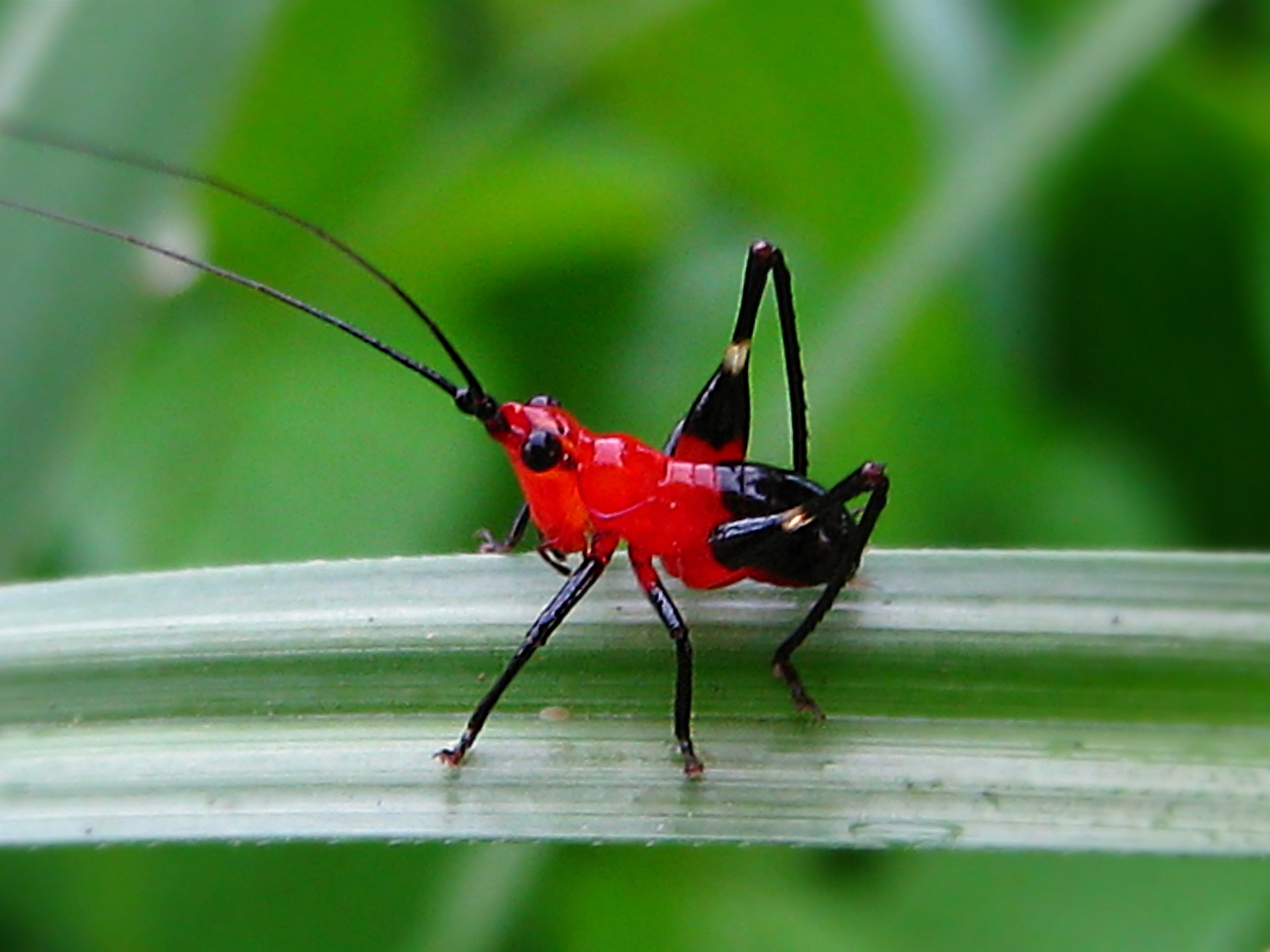

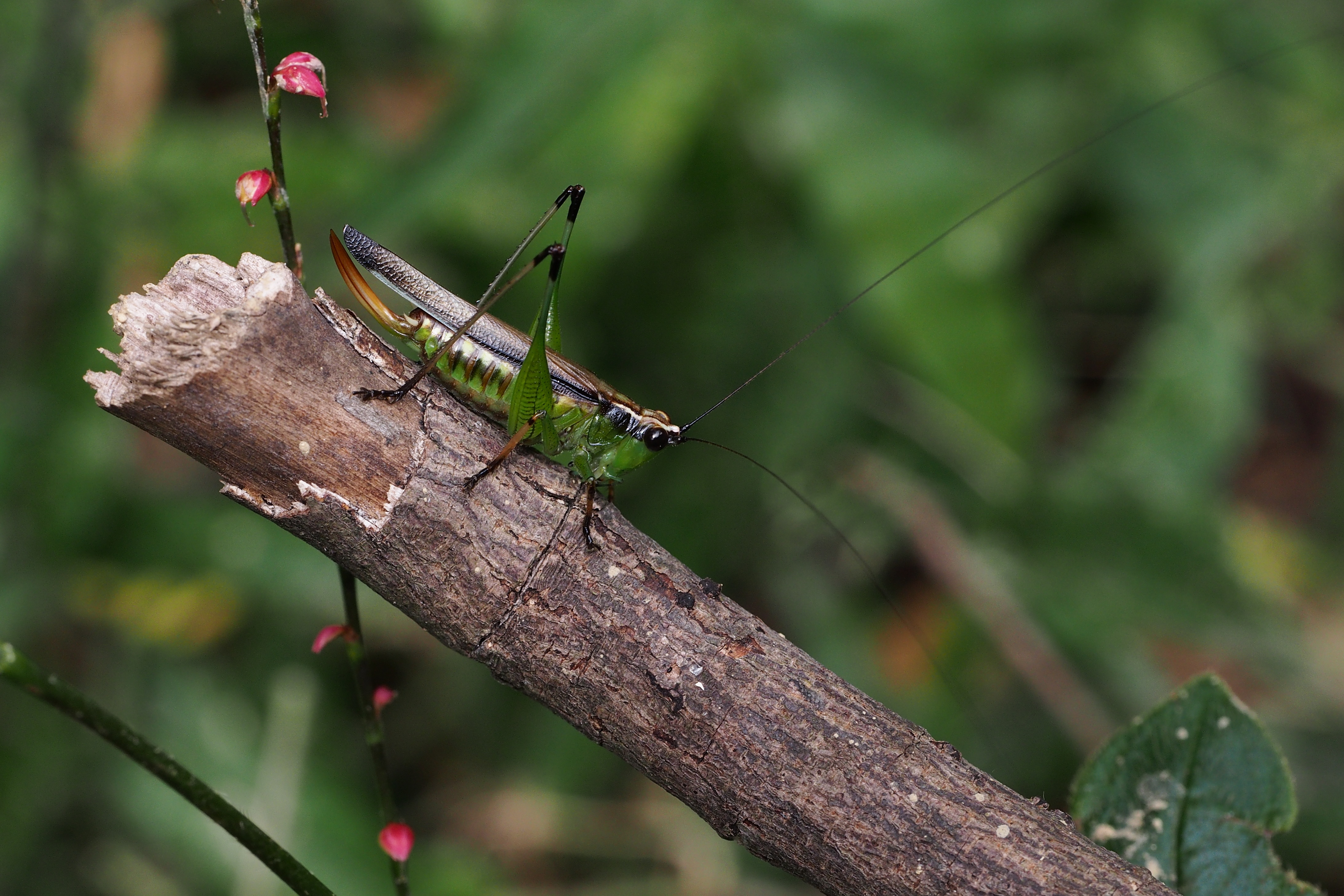
female

song
