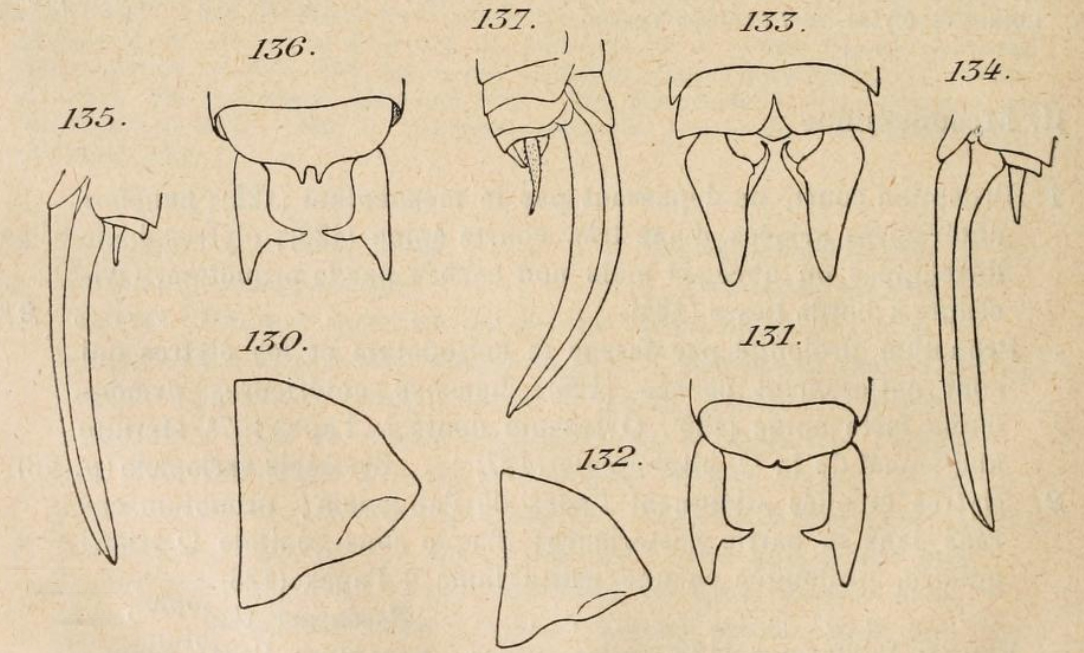
- Chopard's diagram of genitalia of 3 European Conocephalus spp: 132-134 are of C. conocphalus

Scientific classification
- Kingdom: Animalia
- Phylum: Arthropoda
- Class: Insecta
- Order: Orthoptera
- Suborder: Ensifera
- Family: Tettigoniidae
- Tribe: Conocephalini
- Genus: Conocephalus
- Subgenus: Conocephalus
- Species: C. conocephalus

Binomial name
- Conocephalus conocephalus (Linnaeus, 1767)

Synonyms
- Conocephalus hemipterus Thunberg, 1815: Xiphidium aethiopicum (Thunberg, 1789); Locusta aethiopica Thunberg, 1789; Locusta conocephala (Linnaeus, 1767); Anisoptera conocephalus L.; Anisoptera conocephala (L.); Xiphidion conocephalus L.; Gryllus conocephalus L.

= Conocephalus conocephalus =

Species of bush cricket

Conocephalus conocephalus is the type species of the conehead genus Conocephalus and the bush cricket tribe Conocephalini. This species has been recorded from southern Europe, including France, and Africa. Described by Carl von Linné in 1767, C. conocephalus appears to have no surviving type specimens, although it is believed that material may have been obtained from Africa.
