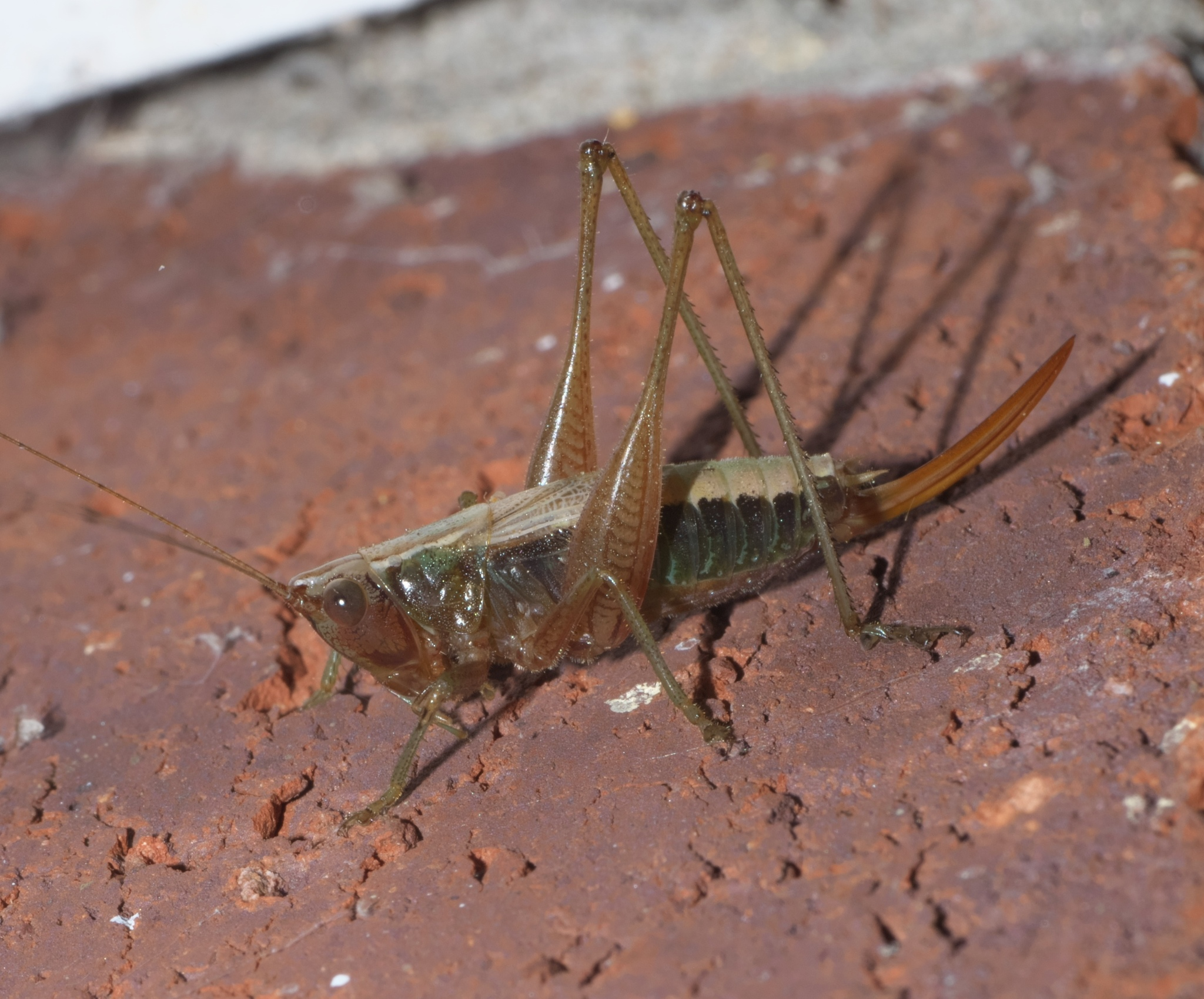
- Conocephalus nemoralis, Oklahoma

Scientific classification
- Domain: Eukaryota
- Kingdom: Animalia
- Phylum: Arthropoda
- Class: Insecta
- Order: Orthoptera
- Suborder: Ensifera
- Family: Tettigoniidae
- Genus: Conocephalus
- Subgenus: Anisoptera
- Species: C. nemoralis

Binomial name
- Conocephalus nemoralis (Scudder, 1875)

= Conocephalus nemoralis =

Species of cricket-like animal

Conocephalus nemoralis, the woodland meadow katydid, is a species of meadow katydid in the family Tettigoniidae. It is found in eastern North America.
