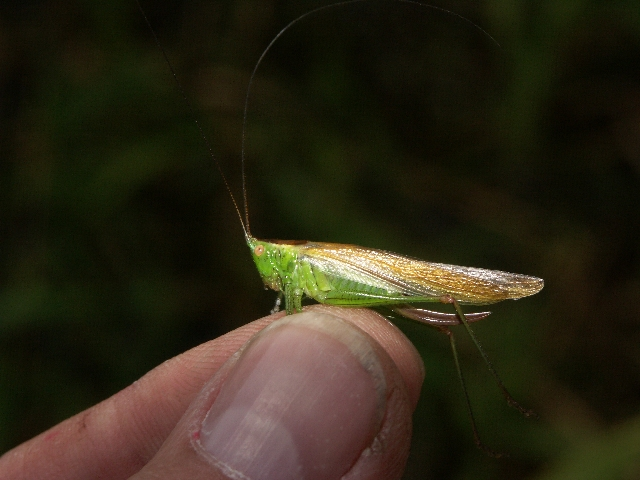
- Adult female short-winged conehead (Conocephalus dorsalis burri)

Scientific classification
- Kingdom: Animalia
- Phylum: Arthropoda
- Clade: Pancrustacea
- Class: Insecta
- Order: Orthoptera
- Suborder: Ensifera
- Family: Tettigoniidae
- Subfamily: Conocephalinae
- Tribe: Conocephalini
- Genus: Conocephalus; Thunberg, 1815

Species
- See text

= Conocephalus =

Genus of cricket-like animals

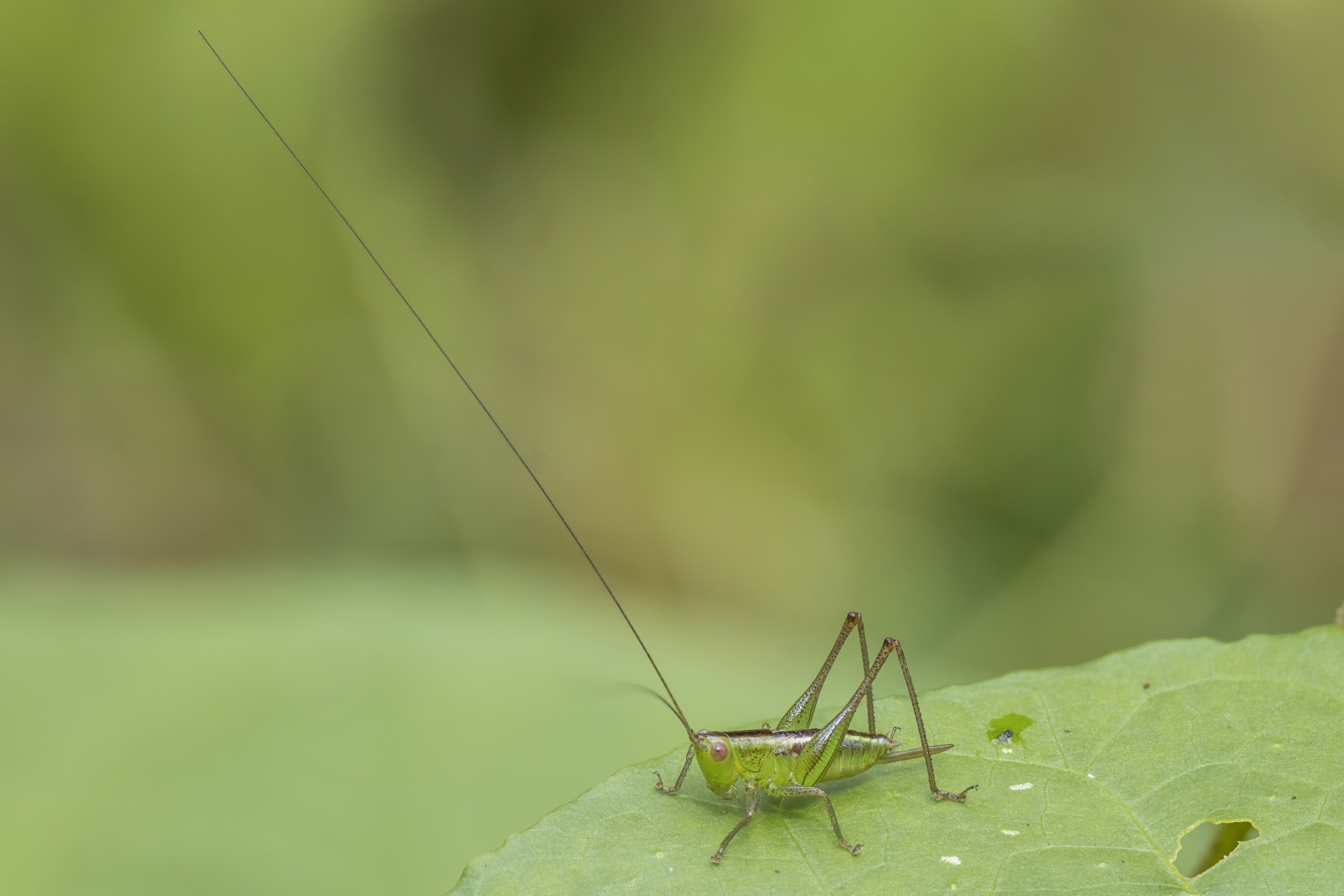
Conocephalus saltator female nymph, Fiji

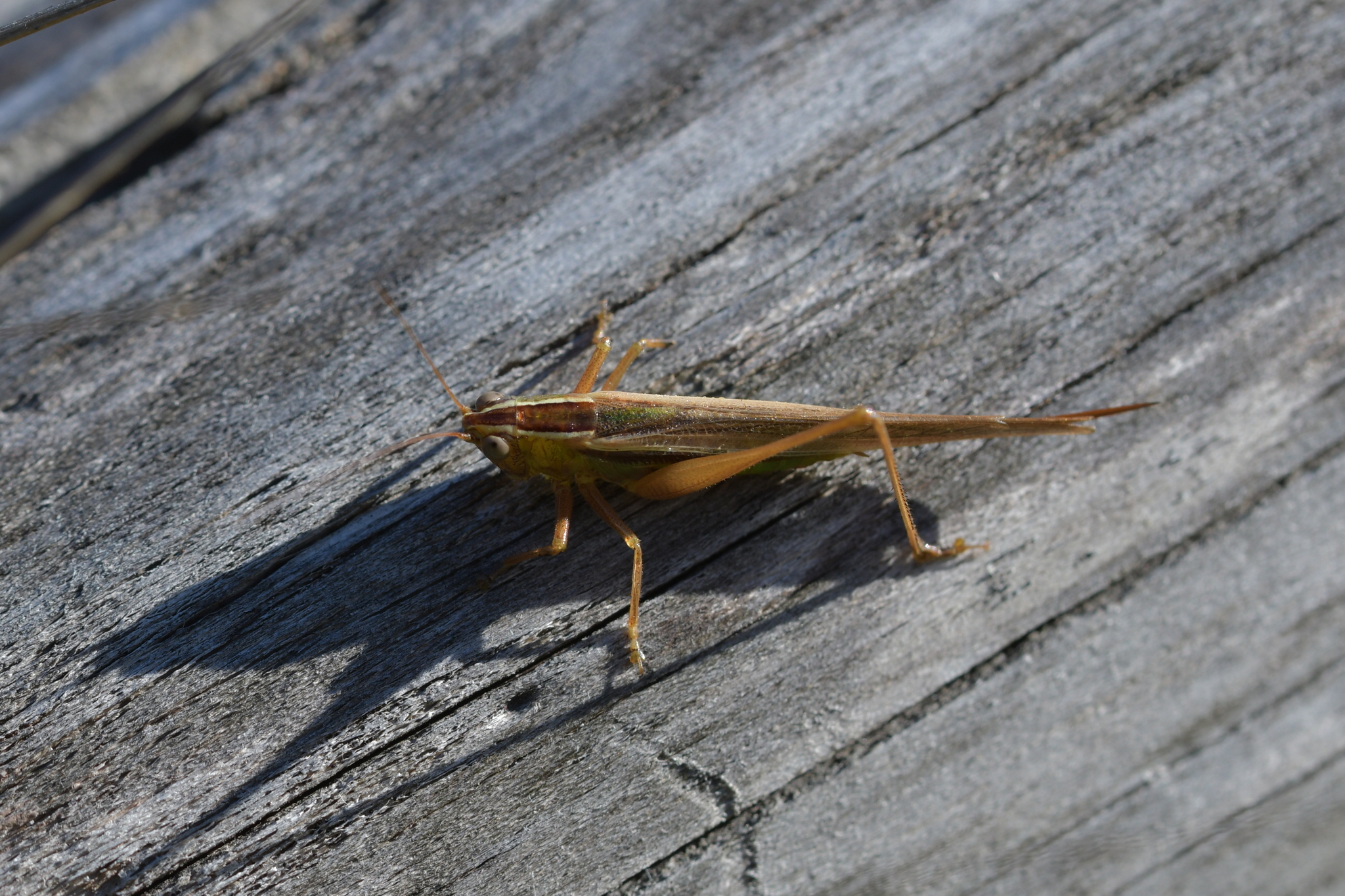
Conocephalus albescens

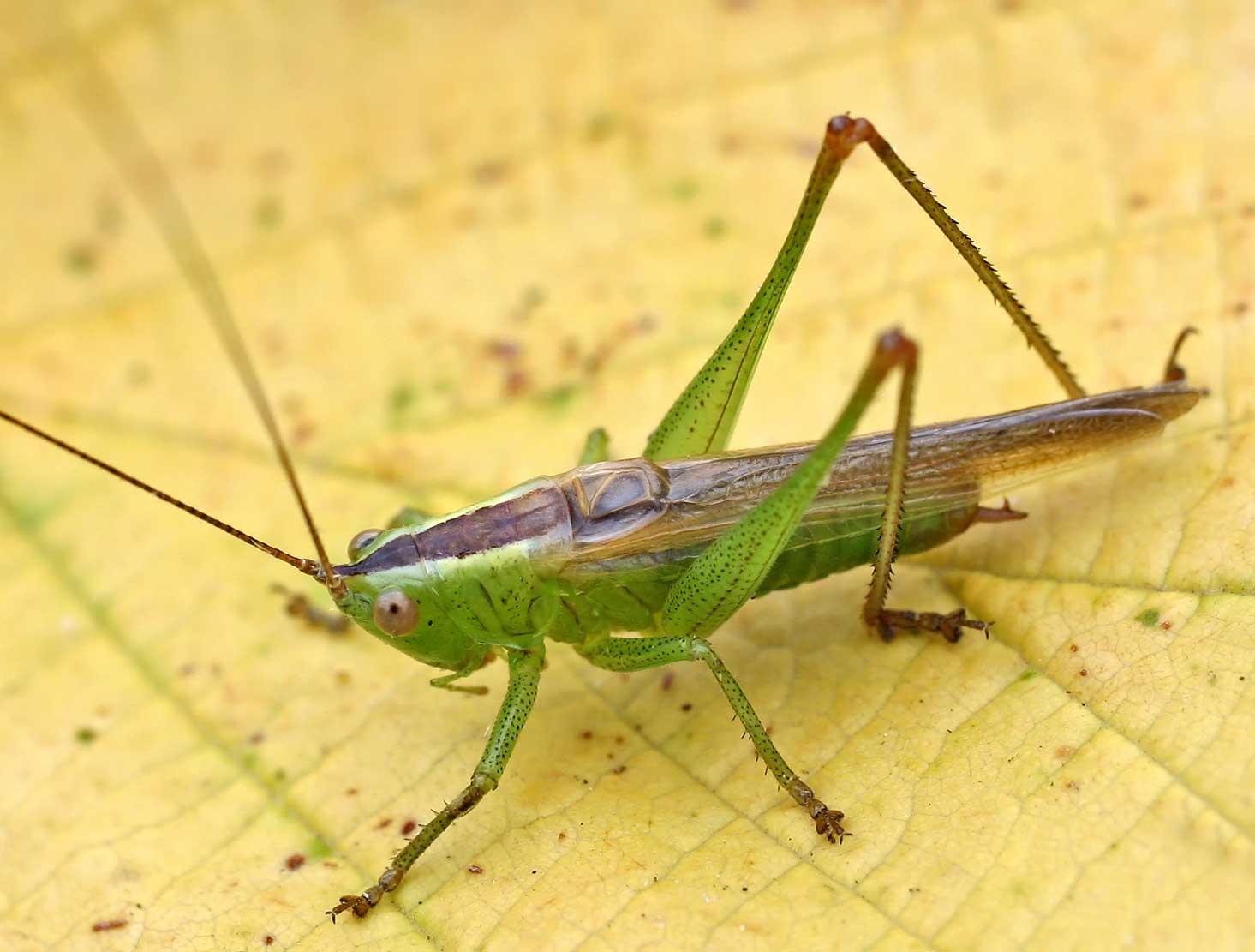
Conocephalus fuscus

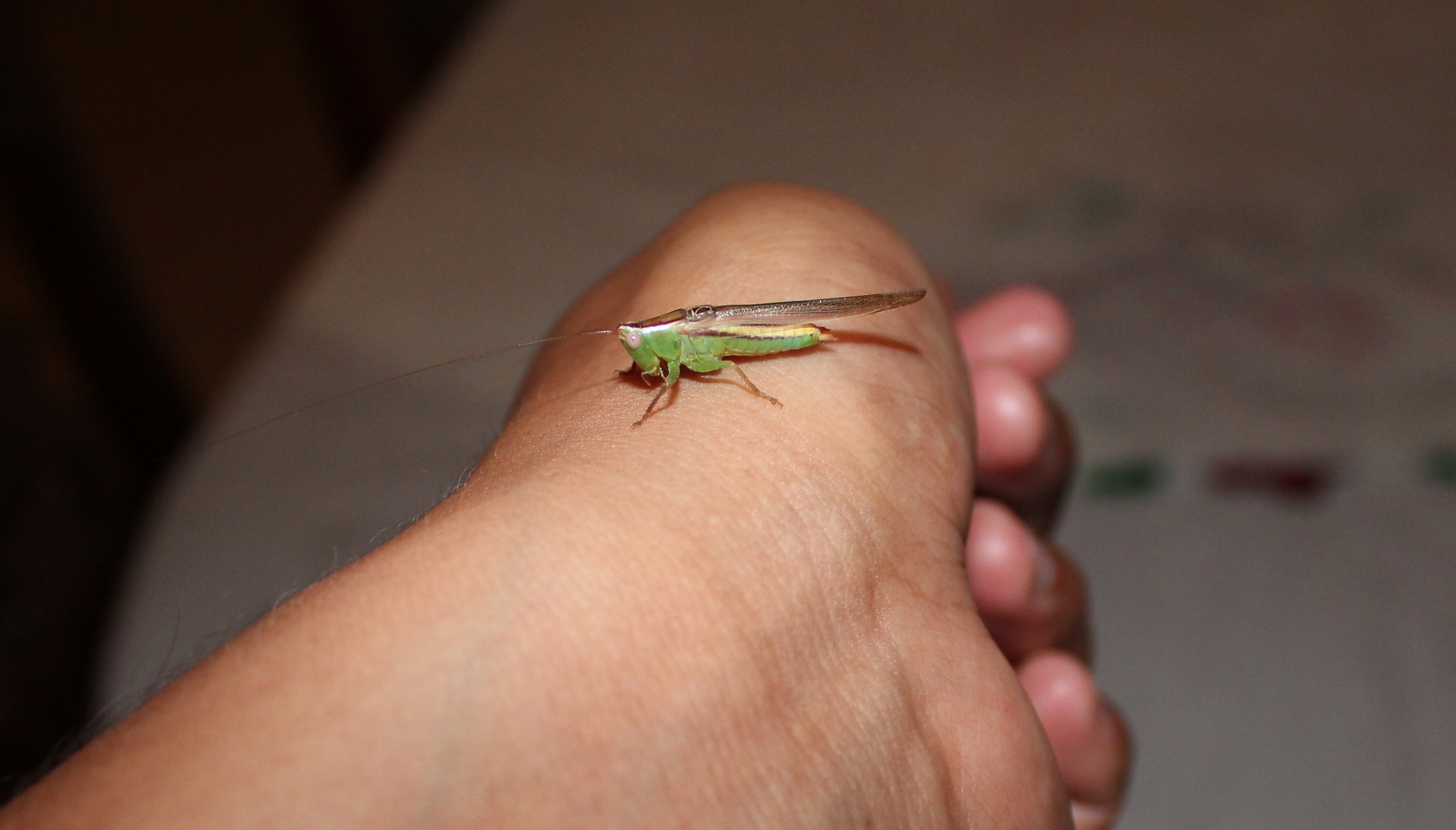
Conocephalus magdalenae

Conocephalus is a genus of bush crickets, known as coneheads (a term also sometimes applied to members of the related genus Ruspolia), or alternatively lesser meadow katydids. It was described by Carl Peter Thunberg in 1815.

== Description ==
Conocephalus range from 10 to 27 mm in length, measured from head to wingtip. They can be distinguished from the related genus Orchelimum by being smaller and slimmer in general, the face usually being green and the ovipositors of females usually being straight.

The forewings vary in length. Some species always have short forewings, some usually have short forewings but occasionally have individuals with forewings longer than the abdomen, and some always have long forewings.

Species can be distinguished by the shapes of the cerci (males) and ovipositor (females).

== Ecology ==
Bush crickets of this genus live in fields and meadows, where they feed on leaves, flowers, pollen and seeds of grasses and forbs. They also sometimes prey on other insects. Females lay their eggs in grass stems.

== Subgenera and species ==
The Orthoptera Species File lists the following species, grouped into subgenera:

=== Conocephalus (Amurocephalus) ===
- subgenus: Storozhenko, 2004 (China)

- Conocephalus chinensis (Redtenbacher, 1891)

=== Conocephalus (Anisoptera) ===
- subgenus: Latreille, 1829 (Worldwide) - synonym Xiphidium Burmeister, 1838

- Conocephalus aberrans (Redtenbacher, 1891)
- Conocephalus adustus (Redtenbacher, 1891)
- Conocephalus aigialus Rehn & Hebard, 1915
- Conocephalus algerinorum Massa, 1999
- Conocephalus angustifrons (Redtenbacher, 1891)
- Conocephalus angustivertex Pitkin, 1980
- Conocephalus armatipes (Karsch, 1893)
- Conocephalus attenuatus (Scudder, 1869)
- Conocephalus bakeri (Karny, 1920)
- Conocephalus bechuanensis (Péringuey, 1916)
- Conocephalus beybienkoi Storozhenko, 1981
- Conocephalus bidentatus Shi & Zheng, 1994
- Conocephalus bilineatus (Erichson, 1842)
- Conocephalus bivittatus (Bolívar, 1900)
- Conocephalus borellii (Giglio-Tos, 1897)
- Conocephalus borneensis (Redtenbacher, 1891)
- Conocephalus brevicercus (Karsch, 1893)
- Conocephalus brevipennis (Scudder, 1862)
- Conocephalus caudalis (Walker, 1869)
- Conocephalus chavesi (Bolívar, 1905)
- Conocephalus cinereus Thunberg, 1815
- Conocephalus cognatus (Redtenbacher, 1891)
- Conocephalus concolor (Burmeister, 1838)
- Conocephalus decaspinosus Nagar & Swaminathan, 2016
- Conocephalus denticercus (Karny, 1907)
- Conocephalus dorsalidentatus Li, Zhang & Shi, 2019
- Conocephalus dorsalis (Latreille, 1804)
- Conocephalus ebneri Harz, 1966
- Conocephalus equatorialis (Giglio-Tos, 1898)
- Conocephalus exemptus (Walker, 1869)
- Conocephalus exitiosus (McNeill, 1901)
- Conocephalus exsul (Karny, 1911)
- Conocephalus fasciatus (De Geer, 1773)
- Conocephalus flavus (Redtenbacher, 1891)
- Conocephalus formosus (Redtenbacher, 1891)
- Conocephalus fulmeki (Ebner, 1927)
- Conocephalus fuscus (Fabricius, 1793): disputed synonym C. discolor (Thunberg, 1815) - long-winged Conehead
- Conocephalus gigantius (Matsumura & Shiraki, 1908)
- Conocephalus goianus Piza, 1977
- Conocephalus gracilicercus Li & Shi, 2018
- Conocephalus gracillimus Morse, 1901
- Conocephalus guangdongensis Shi & Liang, 1997
- Conocephalus hainanensis Shi & Wang, 2015
- Conocephalus hastatus (Charpentier, 1825)
- Conocephalus hilli Farooqi & Usmani, 2019
- Conocephalus honorei (Bolívar, 1900)
- Conocephalus hygrophilus Rehn & Hebard, 1915
- Conocephalus ictus (Scudder, 1875)
- Conocephalus inconspicuus (Karny, 1920)
- Conocephalus infumatus (Redtenbacher, 1891)
- Conocephalus insularis (Morse, 1905)
- Conocephalus iriodes Rehn & Hebard, 1915
- Conocephalus iris (Serville, 1838)
- Conocephalus japonicus (Redtenbacher, 1891)
- Conocephalus kisi Harz, 1967
- Conocephalus kwasiphaiensis Nagar & Swaminathan, 2016
- Conocephalus liangi Liu & Zhang, 2007
- Conocephalus liebermanni Ebner, 1953
- Conocephalus longipennis (Haan, 1843)
- Conocephalus maculatus (Le Guillou, 1841)
- Conocephalus magdalenae Naskrecki, 2000
- Conocephalus meadowsae Harz, 1970
- Conocephalus melaenus (Haan, 1843)
- Conocephalus nanlingensis Li, Xin & Shi, 2019
- Conocephalus nemoralis (Scudder, 1875)
- Conocephalus nigropleuroides Fox, 1912
- Conocephalus nigropleurum (Bruner, 1891)
- Conocephalus occidentalis (Morse, 1901)
- Conocephalus oceanicus (Le Guillou, 1841)
- Conocephalus ochrotelus Rehn & Hebard, 1915
- Conocephalus percaudatus Bey-Bienko, 1955
- Conocephalus peringueyi Uvarov, 1928
- Conocephalus pictus (Redtenbacher, 1891)
- Conocephalus recticaudus Bruner, 1915
- Conocephalus redtenbacheri (Bolívar, 1905)
- Conocephalus rentzi Farooqi & Usmani, 2018
- Conocephalus resacensis Rehn & Hebard, 1915
- Conocephalus resinus (Saussure & Pictet, 1898)
- Conocephalus rhodesianus (Péringuey, 1916)
- Conocephalus saltator (Saussure, 1859)
- Conocephalus semivittatus (Walker, 1869)
- Conocephalus semraensis Farooqi & Usmani, 2021
- Conocephalus shanghaiensis Zhou, Bi & Liu, 2010
- Conocephalus signatus (Redtenbacher, 1891)
- Conocephalus spartinae (Fox, 1912)
- Conocephalus spinosus (Morse, 1901)
- Conocephalus starmuehlneri Kaltenbach, 1968
- Conocephalus strictus (Scudder, 1875)
- Conocephalus trifasciatus (Redtenbacher, 1891)
- Conocephalus trivittatus (Stål, 1861)
- Conocephalus truncatus (Redtenbacher, 1891)
- Conocephalus tumidus Pitkin, 1980
- Conocephalus tumultuosus Willemse, 1942
- Conocephalus unicolor Bruner, 1915
- Conocephalus versicolor (Redtenbacher, 1891)
- Conocephalus vestitus (Redtenbacher, 1891)
- Conocephalus willemsei Pitkin, 1980
- Conocephalus yunnanensis Shi & Feng, 2009

=== Conocephalus (Aphauropus) ===
- subgenus: Rehn & Hebard, 1915 (central America)

- Conocephalus leptopterus Rehn & Hebard, 1915

=== Conocephalus (Chloroxiphidion) ===
- subgenus: Hebard, 1922 (Africa, Australasia: probably incomplete)

- Conocephalus albescens (Walker, 1869)
- Conocephalus bituberculatus (Redtenbacher, 1891)
- Conocephalus dubius Willemse, 1942
- Conocephalus javanicus (Redtenbacher, 1891)
- Conocephalus laetus (Redtenbacher, 1891)
- Conocephalus striata Willemse, 1942
- Conocephalus upoluensis (Karny, 1907)
- Conocephalus vaginatus Willemse, 1942

=== Conocephalus (Conocephalus) ===
- subgenus: Thunberg, 1815 (Worldwide)

- Conocephalus bambusanus Ingrisch, 1990 (synonym C. abispinatus Hsia & Liu, 1990)
- Conocephalus basutoanus Chopard, 1955
- Conocephalus bispinatus Pitkin, 1980
- Conocephalus brevivalvus (Shi, Wang & Fu, 2005)
- Conocephalus brincki Chopard, 1955
- Conocephalus conocephalus (Linnaeus, 1767)
  type species (as Gryllus conocephalus L.)
- Conocephalus differentus Shi & Liang, 1997
- Conocephalus emeiensis Shi & Zheng, 1999
- Conocephalus lugubris (Redtenbacher, 1891)
- Conocephalus obtectus Karny, 1907
- Conocephalus saltans (Scudder, 1872)
- Conocephalus somali (Burr, 1900)
- Conocephalus sulcifrontis Xia & Liu, 1992
- Conocephalus tridens Hebard, 1933
- Conocephalus xiai Liu & Zhang, 2007

=== Conocephalus (Dicellurina) ===
- subgenus: Rehn & Hebard, 1938 (eastern USA)

- Conocephalus allardi (Caudell, 1910)

=== Conocephalus (Megalotheca) ===
- subgenus: Karny, 1907 (southern Africa, Madagascar)

- Conocephalus longiceps (Péringuey, 1916)
- Conocephalus marcelloi Gorochov & Llorente del Moral, 2004
- Conocephalus montana (Uvarov, 1928)
- Conocephalus namibius Gorochov, 2009
- Conocephalus nigrifrons (Chopard, 1952)
- Conocephalus parvula (Péringuey, 1916)
- Conocephalus phasma Gorochov & Llorente del Moral, 2004
- Conocephalus vaginalis (Karny, 1907)
- Conocephalus xiphidioides (Karny, 1907)
- Conocephalus zlobini Gorochov, 2009

=== Conocephalus (Opeastylus) ===
- subgenus: Rehn & Hebard, 1915 (southern America)

- Conocephalus longipes (Redtenbacher, 1891)
- Conocephalus vitticollis (Blanchard, 1851)

=== Conocephalus (Perissacanthus) ===
- subgenus: Rehn & Hebard, 1915 (Paraguay)

- Conocephalus strictoides (Caudell, 1906)

=== Conocephalus (Xenocerculus) ===
- subgenus: Rubio & Braun 2024 (Argentina)

- Conocephalus tuyu Rubio & Braun 2024

=== subgenus not assigned ===
- Conocephalus aculeatus Piza, 1969
- Conocephalus affinis Redtenbacher, 1891
- Conocephalus goianus Piza, 1977
- Conocephalus algerinorum Massa, 1999
- Conocephalus cinereus Thunberg, 1815
- Conocephalus differentus Shi & Liang, 1997
- Conocephalus emeiensis Shi & Zheng, 1999
- Conocephalus halophilus Ishikawa, 2004
- Conocephalus melaenoides Sänger & Helfert, 1995
- Conocephalus sojolensis Sänger & Helfert, 1995
- Conocephalus spinosus (Morse, 1901)
- Conocephalus stictomerus Rehn & Hebard, 1915
