= Conocephalus spinosus =

Scientific classification
- Domain: Eukaryota
- Kingdom: Animalia
- Phylum: Arthropoda
- Class: Insecta
- Order: Orthoptera
- Suborder: Ensifera
- Family: Tettigoniidae
- Tribe: Conocephalini
- Genus: Conocephalus
- Species: C. spinosus

Binomial name
- Conocephalus spinosus (Morse, 1901)

Species of cricket-like animal

Conocephalus spinosus, the San Diego meadow katydid, is a species of meadow katydid in the family Tettigoniidae. It is found in North America.
