= Conocephalus aigialus =

Scientific classification
- Domain: Eukaryota
- Kingdom: Animalia
- Phylum: Arthropoda
- Class: Insecta
- Order: Orthoptera
- Suborder: Ensifera
- Family: Tettigoniidae
- Genus: Conocephalus
- Subgenus: Conocephalus
- Species: C. aigialus

Binomial name
- Conocephalus aigialus Rehn & Hebard, 1915

Species of cricket-like animal

Conocephalus aigialus, the seashore meadow katydid, is a species of meadow katydid in the family Tettigoniidae. It is found in North America.
