= Conocephalus occidentalis =

Scientific classification
- Domain: Eukaryota
- Kingdom: Animalia
- Phylum: Arthropoda
- Class: Insecta
- Order: Orthoptera
- Suborder: Ensifera
- Family: Tettigoniidae
- Genus: Conocephalus
- Subgenus: Anisoptera
- Species: C. occidentalis

Binomial name
- Conocephalus occidentalis (Morse, 1901)

Species of cricket-like animal

Conocephalus occidentalis, the Pacific meadow katydid, is a species of meadow katydid in the family Tettigoniidae. It is found in North America.
