= Conocephalus obtectus =

Scientific classification
- Domain: Eukaryota
- Kingdom: Animalia
- Phylum: Arthropoda
- Class: Insecta
- Order: Orthoptera
- Suborder: Ensifera
- Family: Tettigoniidae
- Genus: Conocephalus
- Subgenus: Conocephalus
- Species: C. obtectus

Binomial name
- Conocephalus obtectus (Karny, 1907)

Synonyms
- Xiphidion obtectum Karny, 1907; Anisoptera obtecta Griffini, 1908

Species of cricket-like animal

Conocephalus obtectus is a species of Tettigoniidae (bush-crickets or katydids) found in La Réunion. and in Congo

It has a bodylength of 13mm.
