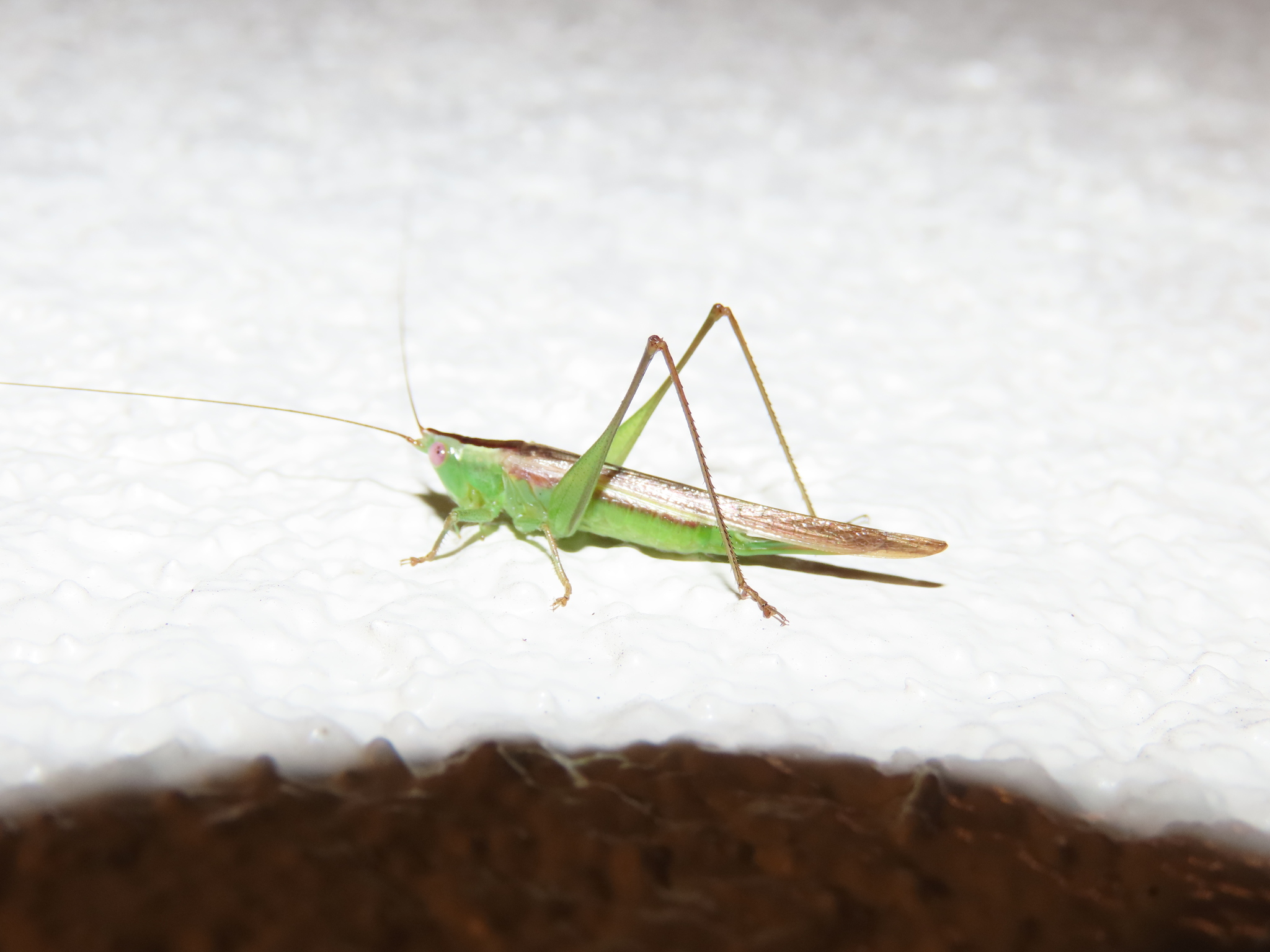

Scientific classification
- Domain: Eukaryota
- Kingdom: Animalia
- Phylum: Arthropoda
- Class: Insecta
- Order: Orthoptera
- Suborder: Ensifera
- Family: Tettigoniidae
- Genus: Conocephalus
- Subgenus: Anisoptera
- Species: C. gracillimus

Binomial name
- Conocephalus gracillimus Morse, 1891

= Conocephalus gracillimus =

Species of cricket-like animal

Conocephalus gracillimus, the graceful meadow katydid, is a species of meadow katydid in the family Tettigoniidae. It is found in North America.
