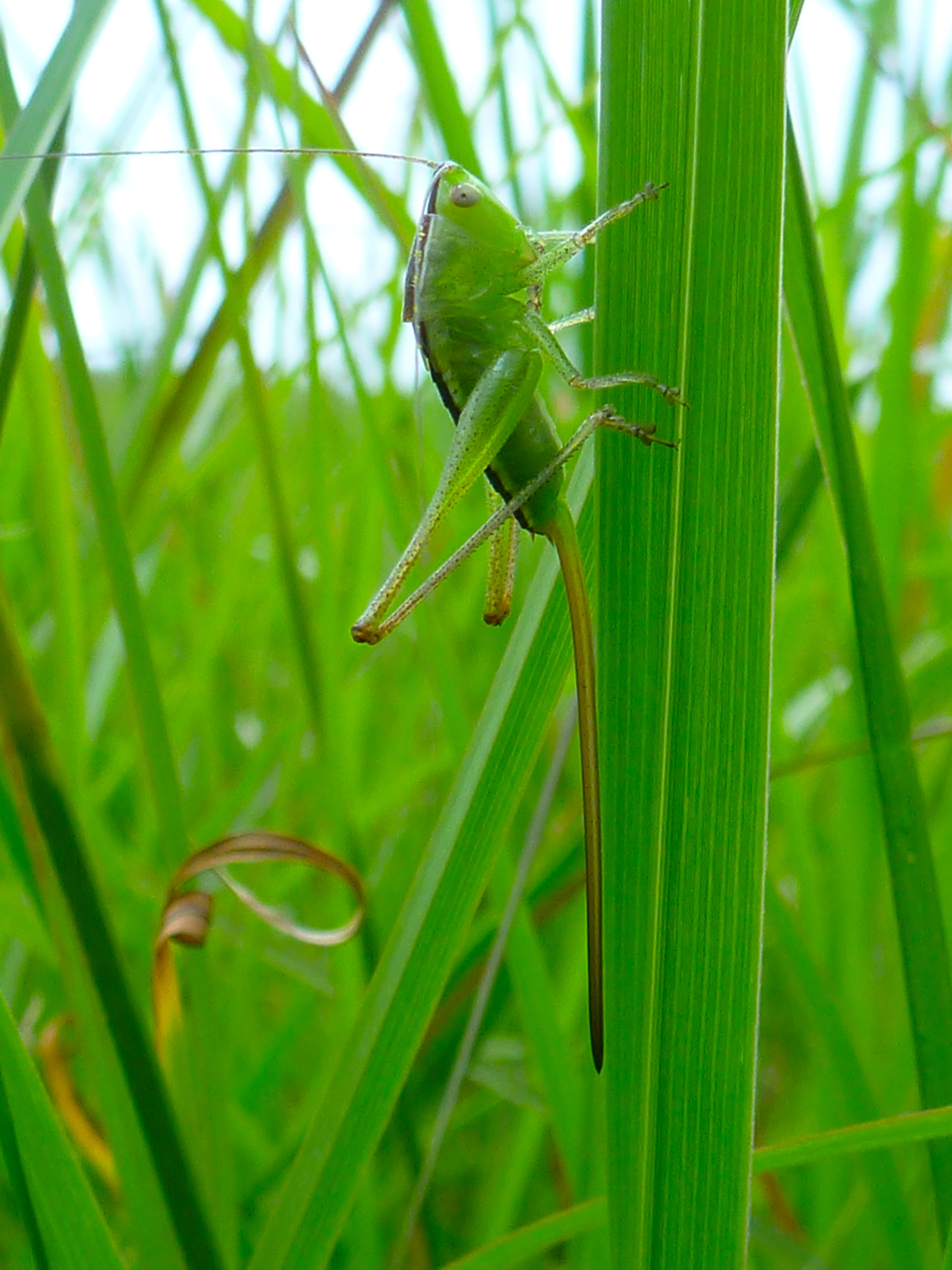

Scientific classification
- Domain: Eukaryota
- Kingdom: Animalia
- Phylum: Arthropoda
- Class: Insecta
- Order: Orthoptera
- Suborder: Ensifera
- Family: Tettigoniidae
- Genus: Conocephalus
- Subgenus: Anisoptera
- Species: C. strictus

Binomial name
- Conocephalus strictus (Scudder, 1875)

= Conocephalus strictus =

Species of cricket-like animal

Conocephalus strictus, the straight-lanced meadow katydid, is a species of katydid (family Tettigoniidae) found in North America.

== Description ==
The straight-lanced meadow katydid is large and robust for a Conocephalus, ranging from 13 to 30 mm. It is green and brown in color and has short tegmina (forewings). The short-winged form is 13–22 mm, while the long-winged form is 21–30 mm. Males have long cerci which are tapered beyond the tooth and flattened in their final third, and the ability to bend their bodies at extreme angles. Females have a straight ovipositor which exceeds body length. The species was named for the distinct ovipositor of the female.

== Diet ==
The diet of the Conocephalus strictus consists mostly of grasses.

== Distribution ==
This katydid is found mainly within the range of central Arizona to southern Montana and southern New York to southern Georgia within the United States, but is also found in parts of Mexico and Canada. They can commonly be found in dry grasslands and old fields with grasses. Their preferred habitat is that of open areas of short grass along roadsides and in pastures, and they are usually found in clumps of large numbers. The Straight-lanced Meadow Katydid's song is a faint purr at 10–20 kHz with a pulsating quality. Adults first appear in the late summer, but they occur year-round.

== Similar species ==
Similar, co-occurring species are found both in the same genus (e.g., Conocephalus fasciatus), and within the genus Orchelimum (e.g., Orchelimum vulgare). All of these species have shorter ovipositors and cerci.
