= Conocephalus stictomerus =

Scientific classification
- Domain: Eukaryota
- Kingdom: Animalia
- Phylum: Arthropoda
- Class: Insecta
- Order: Orthoptera
- Suborder: Ensifera
- Family: Tettigoniidae
- Tribe: Conocephalini
- Genus: Conocephalus
- Species: C. stictomerus

Binomial name
- Conocephalus stictomerus Rehn & Hebard, 1915

Species of cricket-like animal

Conocephalus stictomerus, the spot-legged meadow katydid, is a species of meadow katydid in the family Tettigoniidae. It is found in North America.
