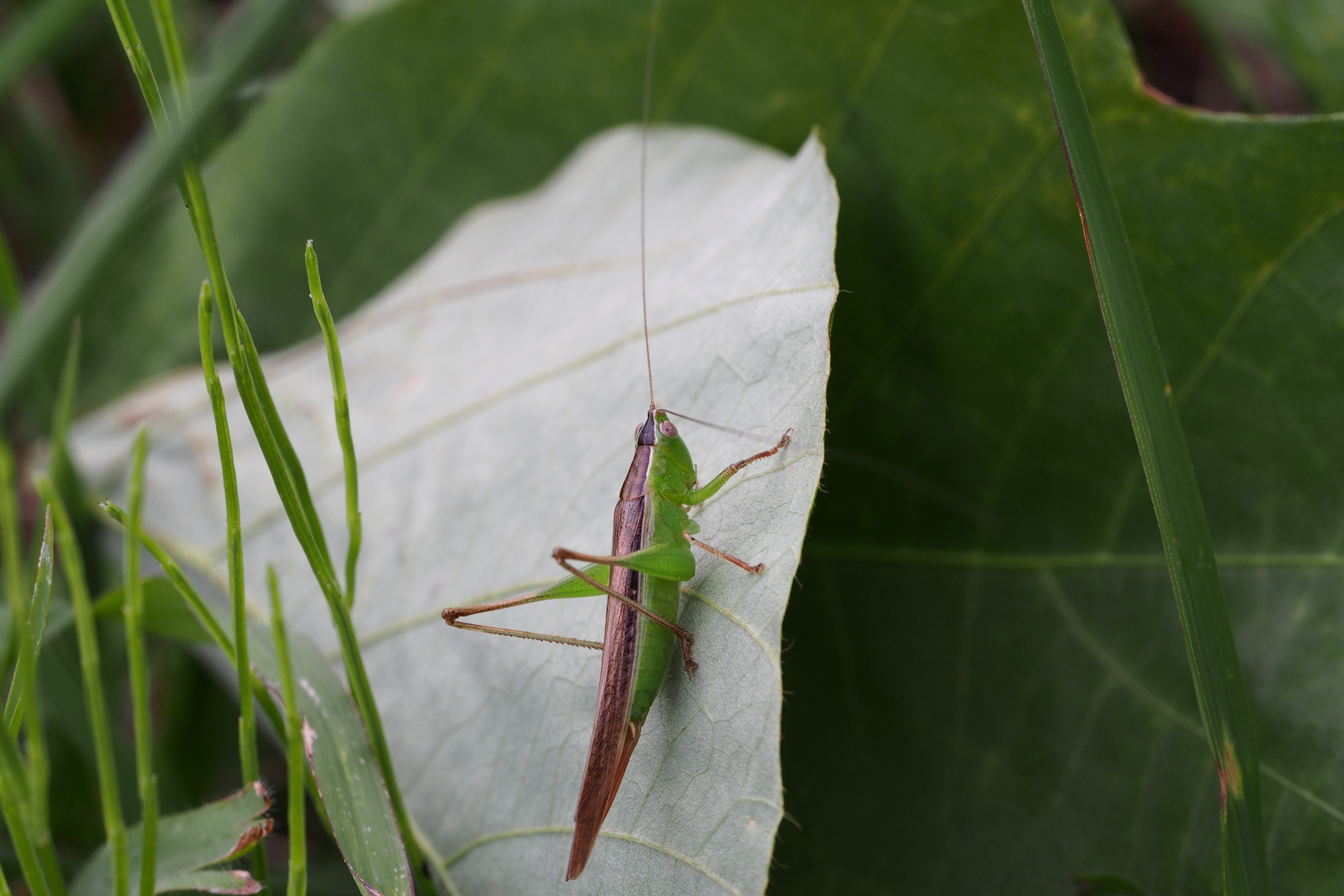

Scientific classification
- Kingdom: Animalia
- Phylum: Arthropoda
- Class: Insecta
- Order: Orthoptera
- Suborder: Ensifera
- Family: Tettigoniidae
- Genus: Conocephalus
- Species: C. maculatus

Binomial name
- Conocephalus maculatus (Le Guillou, 1841)

Synonyms
- Xiphidion maculates

= Conocephalus maculatus =

Species of grasshopper

Conocephalus maculatus is a species of bush cricket in the cone head subgenus Anisoptera. It has a widespread distribution in Africa southern and South-East Asia and is a pest of millets and maize in Northeast India. During the summer of 2008, a large swarm severely damaged millet and maize crops in Manipur and Nagaland.
