= Conocephalus spartinae =

Scientific classification
- Domain: Eukaryota
- Kingdom: Animalia
- Phylum: Arthropoda
- Class: Insecta
- Order: Orthoptera
- Suborder: Ensifera
- Family: Tettigoniidae
- Genus: Conocephalus
- Subgenus: Conocephalus
- Species: C. spartinae

Binomial name
- Conocephalus spartinae Fox, 1912

Species of cricket-like animal

Conocephalus spartinae, the saltmarsh meadow katydid, is a species of meadow katydid in the family Tettigoniidae. It is found in North America.
