= Conocephalus (Megalotheca) =

Scientific classification
- Kingdom: Animalia
- Phylum: Arthropoda
- Class: Insecta
- Order: Orthoptera
- Suborder: Ensifera
- Family: Tettigoniidae
- Genus: Conocephalus
- Subgenus: Megalotheca; Karny, 1907

Synonyms
- Megalotheca Karny, 1907

Subgenus of cricket-like animals

Megalotheca was an African genus of bush cricket in the subfamily Conocephalinae. It is n considered a subgenus of Conocephalus.
