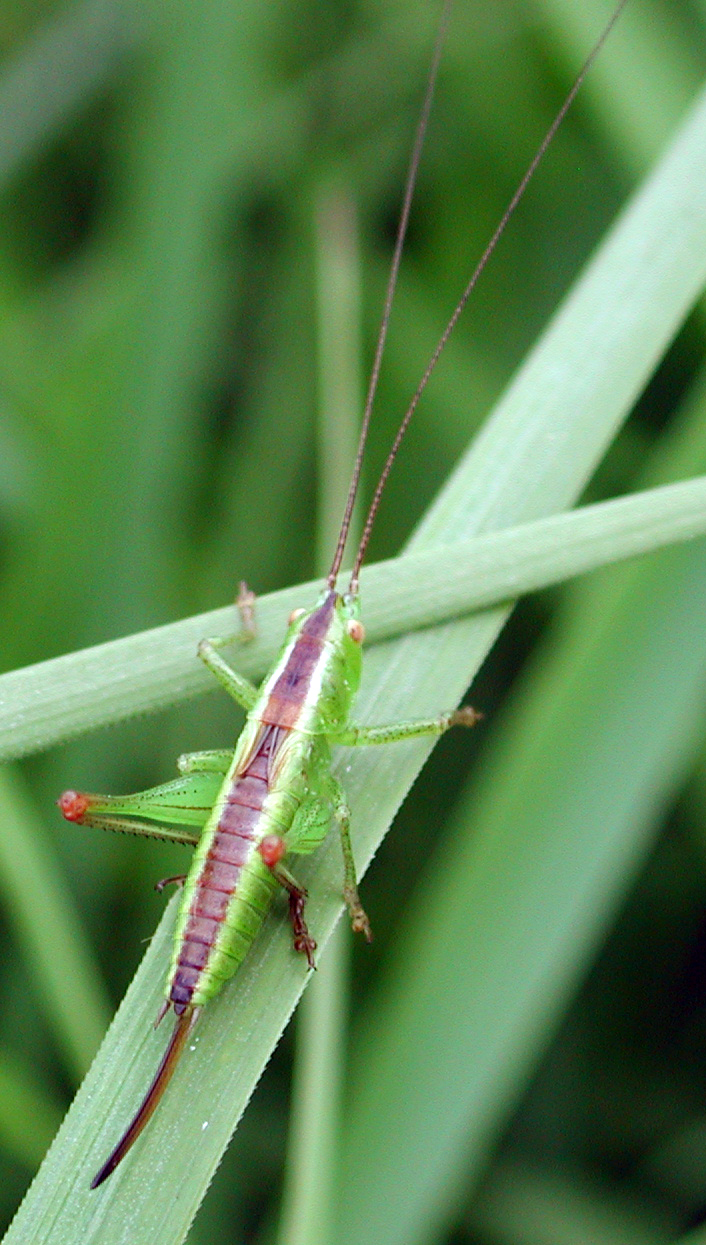
- Conocephalus dorsalis Germany

Scientific classification
- Kingdom: Animalia
- Phylum: Arthropoda
- Class: Insecta
- Order: Orthoptera
- Suborder: Ensifera
- Family: Tettigoniidae
- Genus: Conocephalus
- Subgenus: Anisoptera
- Species: C. dorsalis

Binomial name
- Conocephalus dorsalis (Latreille, 1804)

Synonyms
- Xiphidium brevicaudatum (Uvarov, 1910); Xiphidion dorsale var. burri (Ebner, 1910); Anisoptera hungaricus (Cziki, 1923)

= Conocephalus dorsalis =

Species of cricket-like animal

Conocephalus dorsalis, the short-winged conehead, is a bush cricket species belonging to the family Tettigoniidae, subfamily Conocephalinae. It is a hygrophilous species, and is therefore common in wet meadows and slow-flowing streams with floating plants, lowland peatlands, reed beds. It is found throughout Europe and it is common in northern Germany, Britain and southern Scandinavia.

Close-Up of a Conocephalus dorsalis
