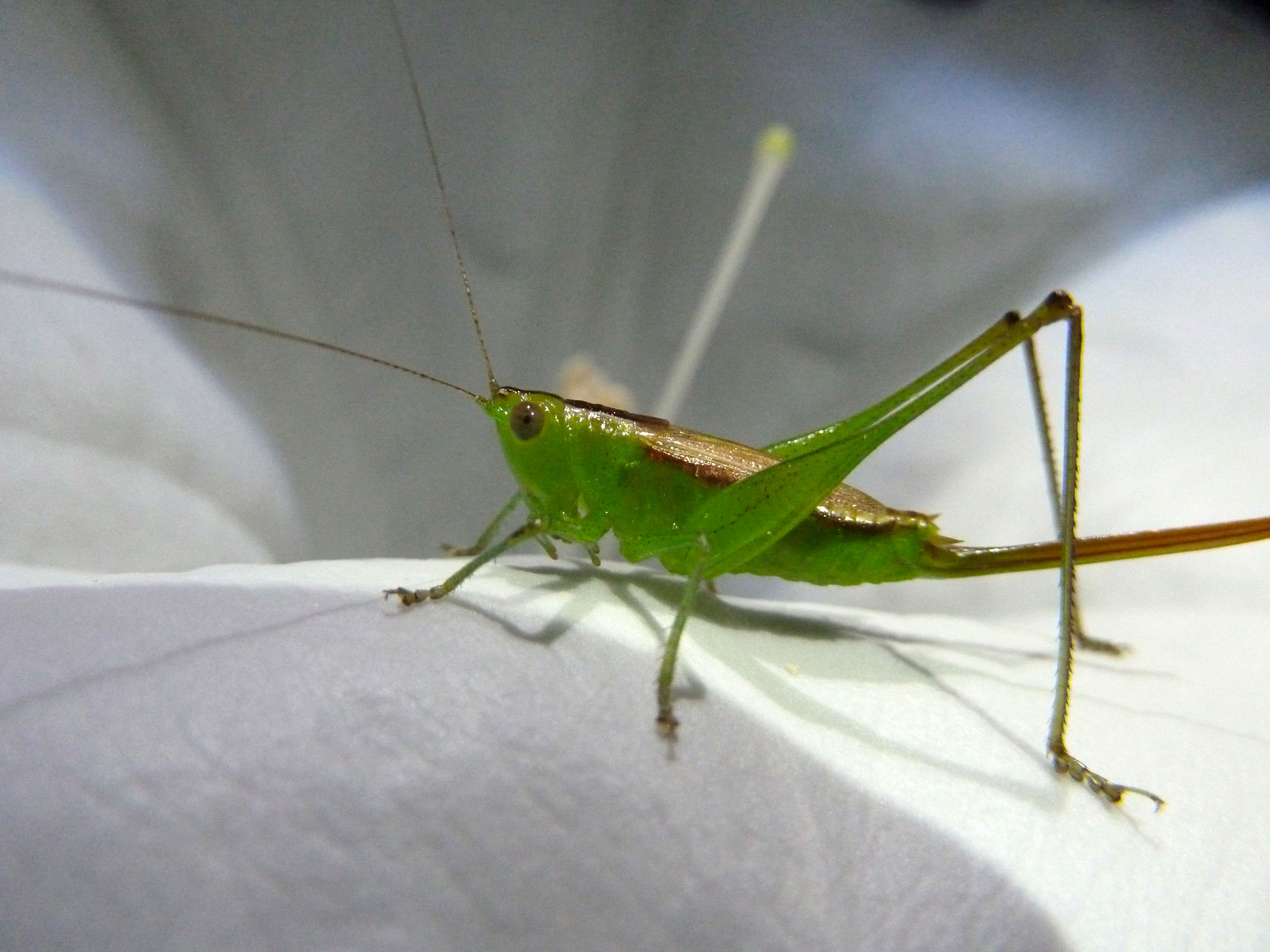

Scientific classification
- Domain: Eukaryota
- Kingdom: Animalia
- Phylum: Arthropoda
- Class: Insecta
- Order: Orthoptera
- Suborder: Ensifera
- Family: Tettigoniidae
- Genus: Conocephalus
- Subgenus: Conocephalus
- Species: C. brevipennis

Binomial name
- Conocephalus brevipennis (Scudder, 1863)

= Conocephalus brevipennis =

Species of cricket-like animal

Conocephalus brevipennis, the short-winged meadow katydid, is a species of meadow katydid in the family Tettigoniidae. It is found in North America and the Caribbean.

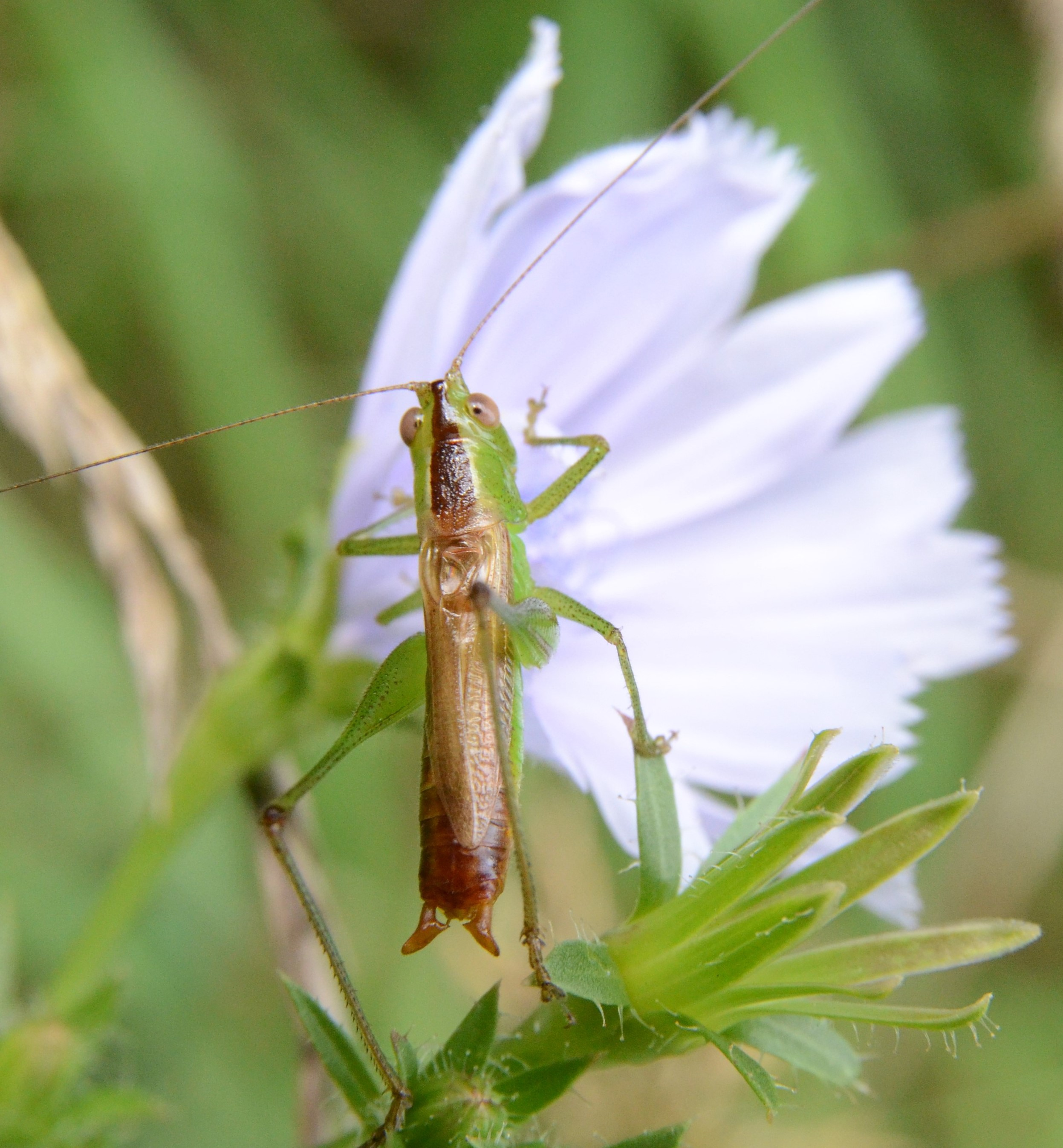
Short-winged meadow katydid, Conocephalus brevipennis

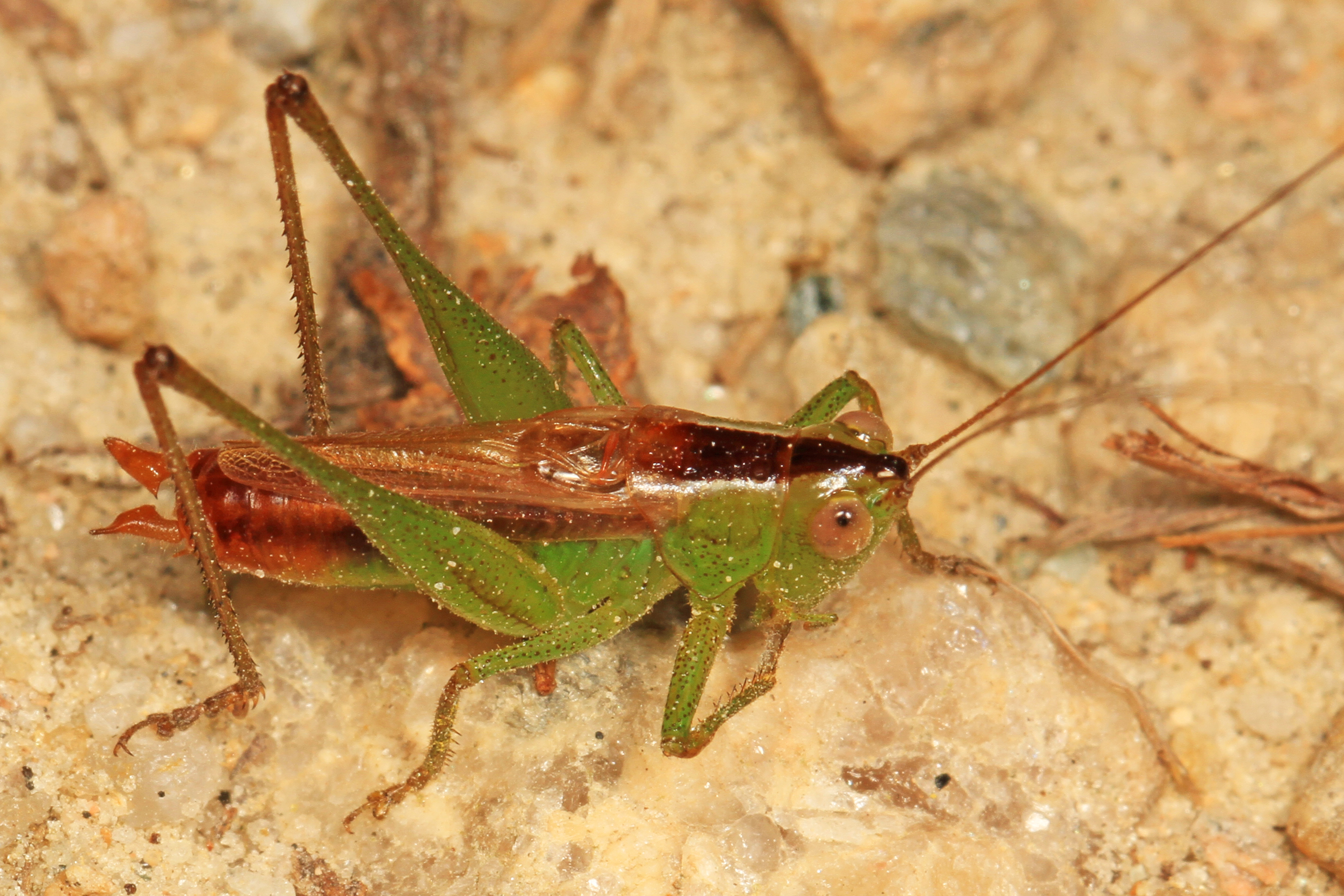
Short-winged meadow katydid, Conocephalus brevipennis
