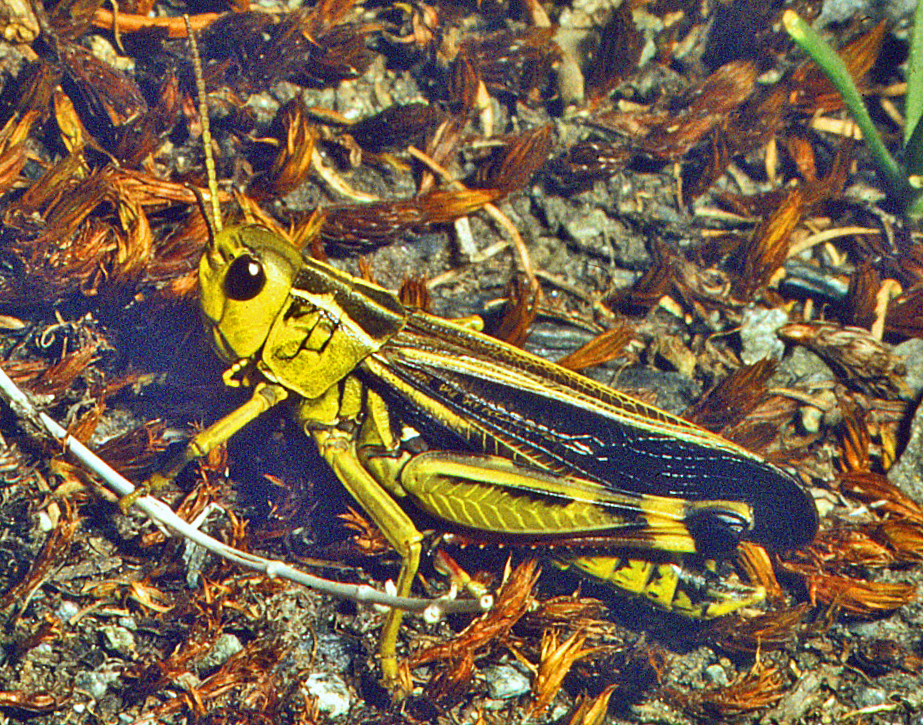
- Arcyptera fusca. Male
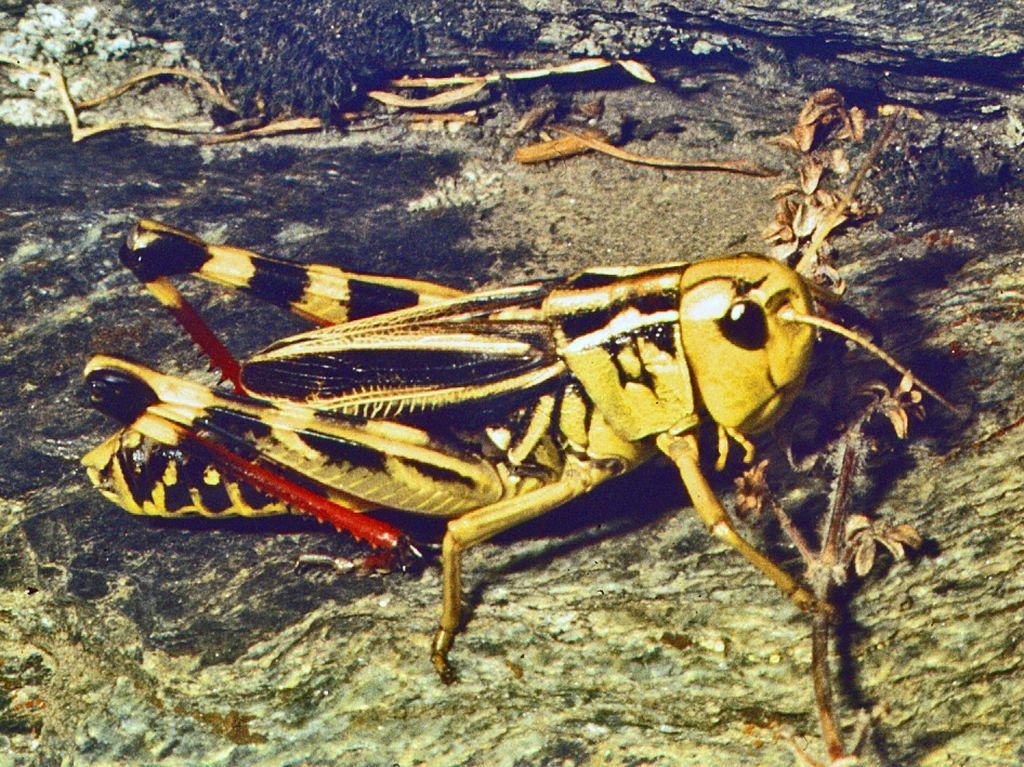
- Female

Scientific classification
- Kingdom: Animalia
- Phylum: Arthropoda
- Clade: Pancrustacea
- Class: Insecta
- Order: Orthoptera
- Suborder: Caelifera
- Family: Acrididae
- Subfamily: Gomphocerinae
- Tribe: Arcypterini
- Genus: Arcyptera
- Species: A. fusca

Binomial name
- Arcyptera fusca (Pallas, 1773)
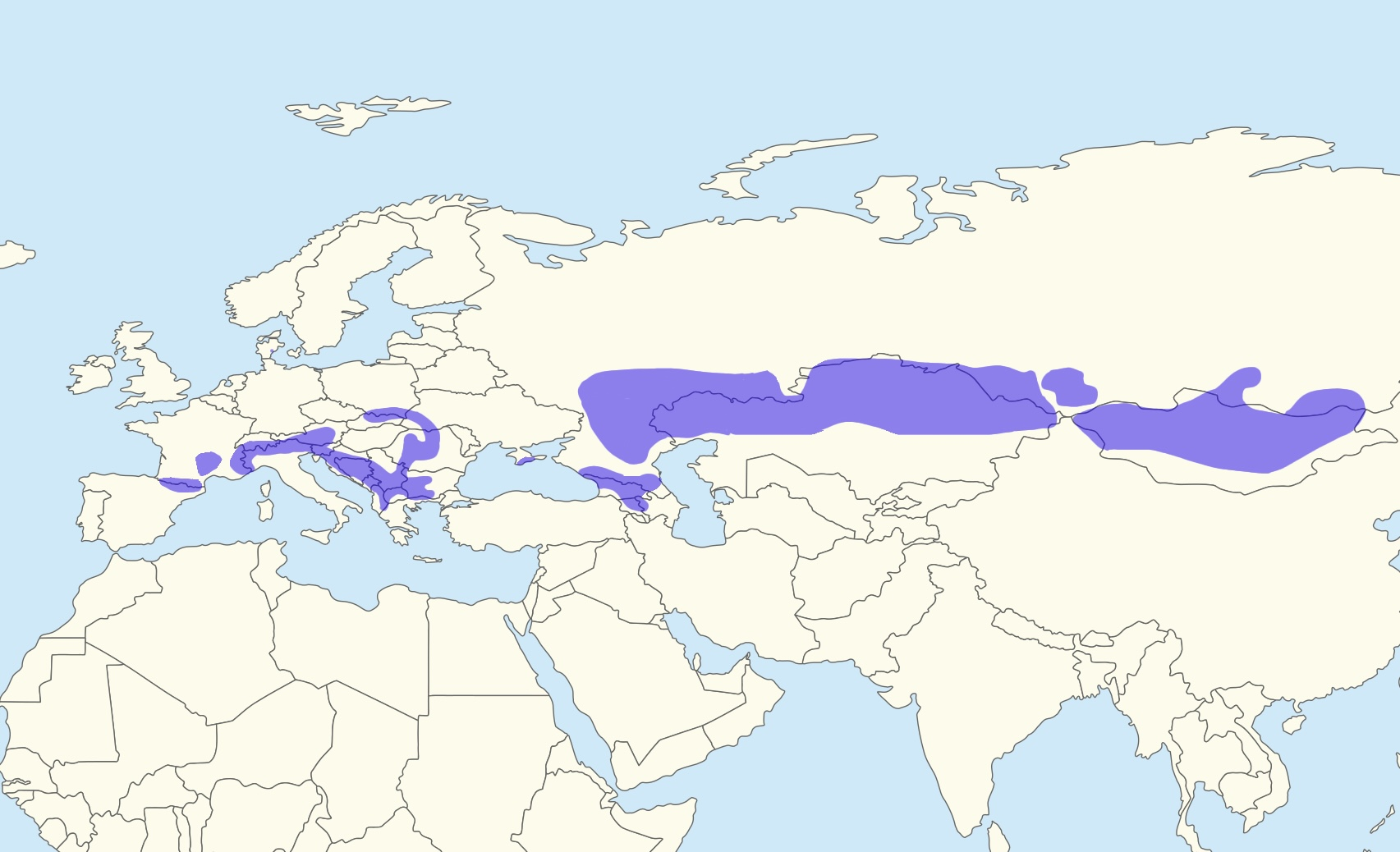

Synonyms
- Arcyptera stolli Fieber, 1853; Gryllus cothurnatus Creutzer, 1799; Gryllus fuscus Pallas, 1773; Gryllus nympha Stoll, C., 1813; Gryllus variegatus Sulzer, 1776; Gryllus versicolor Gmelin, 1788; Acryptera fusca (misspelling)

= Arcyptera fusca =

Species of grasshopper

Close-Up of a Arcyptera fusca

Arcyptera fusca, the large banded grasshopper, is a species of 'short-horned grasshoppers' belonging to the family Acrididae subfamily Gomphocerinae.

== Distribution ==
This species is native of the steppes of Central Asia, but it is nowadays present in most of Europe, in eastern Palearctic realm, and in the Near East (the Pyrenees, the Alps, the Carpathians, the Caucasus and Siberia).

== Habitat ==
They can be encountered in the alpine dry meadows, glades, heath, mountain pastures and grasslands, at an elevation up to 1,000 metres (3,300 ft) above sea level.

== Description ==
Arcyptera fusca can reach a body length of 22–35 millimetres (0.87–1.38 in) in males, while females reach a length of 29–44 millimetres (1.1–1.7 in). These medium-sized grasshoppers are characterized by a significant sexual dimorphism. Males have developed functional wings (oft 20–27.3 millimetres (0.79–1.07 in) covering the abdomen, while females have rudimentary wings (of 12.3–20.1 millimetres (0.48–0.79 in)), shorter than abdomen and unfit for flight (brachyptery). The basic body color is ocher or yellow-green, with dark markings. The hind tibiae have a characteristic bright red color that extended to the inner face of femora. The knees are black, surrounded by a white band.

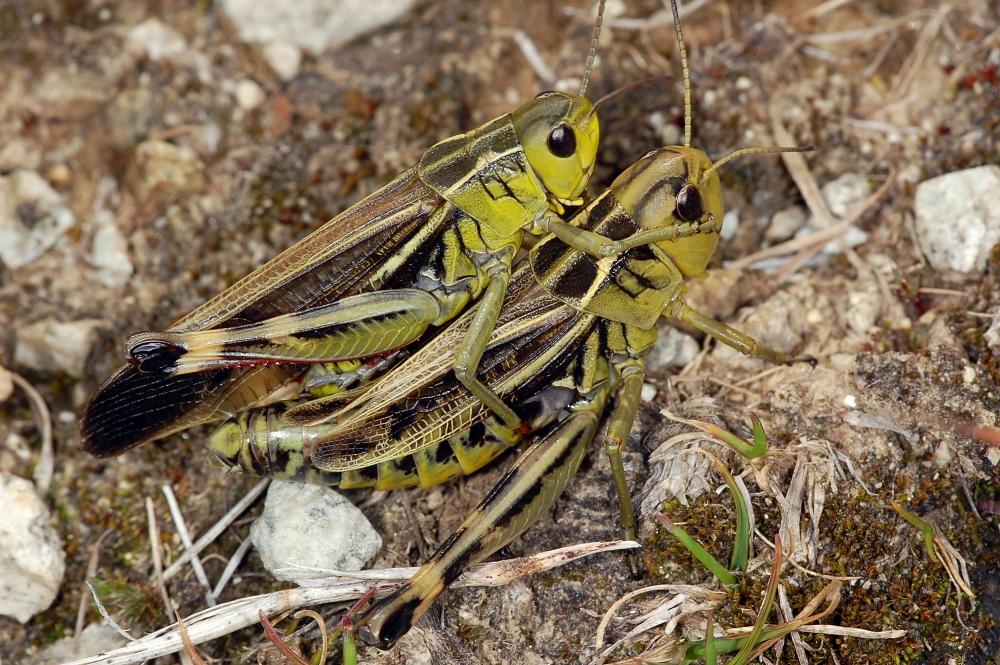
Mating couple

== Biology ==
Adults mainly feed on Poaceae species. Males use a range of different stridulations for signaling their presence in the territory, for engaging in a dispute with a rival of the same sex or for courting females.

Eggs are spawned in oothecae in short tunnels dug in the ground.

== Bibliography ==
- Bei-Bienko & Mishchenko (1951) Keys to the fauna of the U.S.S.R. [1964 English translation, no. 40], Locusts and Grasshoppers of the U.S.S.R. and Adjacent Countries, Zoological Inst. of the U.S.S.R. Academy of Sciences, Moscow/Leningrad 2:385-667 [1-291]
- Bukhvalova (1993) Acoustic signals of Arcyptera fusca fusca (Pall.) and A. fusca albogeniculata Ikonn. (Orthoptera, Acrididae), Vestnik Moskovskogo Universiteta Seriya XVI Biologiya 1993(1):46-49, 79, illustr.
- Detzel & Wancura In Detzel [Ed.] (1998) Arcyptera fusca, Die Heuschrecken Baden-Württembergs, Eugen Ulmer Verlag, Stuttgart 406-410
- Storozhenko (1988) A review of the genus Arcyptera Aud-Serv. (Orthoptera: Acrididae) (in Russian with English summary), Trudy Zoologitscheskogo Instituta, Akademiia Nauk SSSR, Leningrad [= Proceedings of the Zoological Institute, USSR Academy of Sciences, Leningrad] (Trudy Zool. Inst., Akad. Nauk SSSR, Leningrad) 178:47-55
- Willemse, F.M.H. (1976) Notes on Arcyptera species from Greece and Turkey, with special reference to A. Labiata (Brulle 1832) (Orthoptera: Acrididae), Publicaties van her natuurhistorisch Genootschap im Limburg (Publ. natuurhist. Genootsch. Limburg) 26(1-3):23-35

Arcyptera fusca recording
