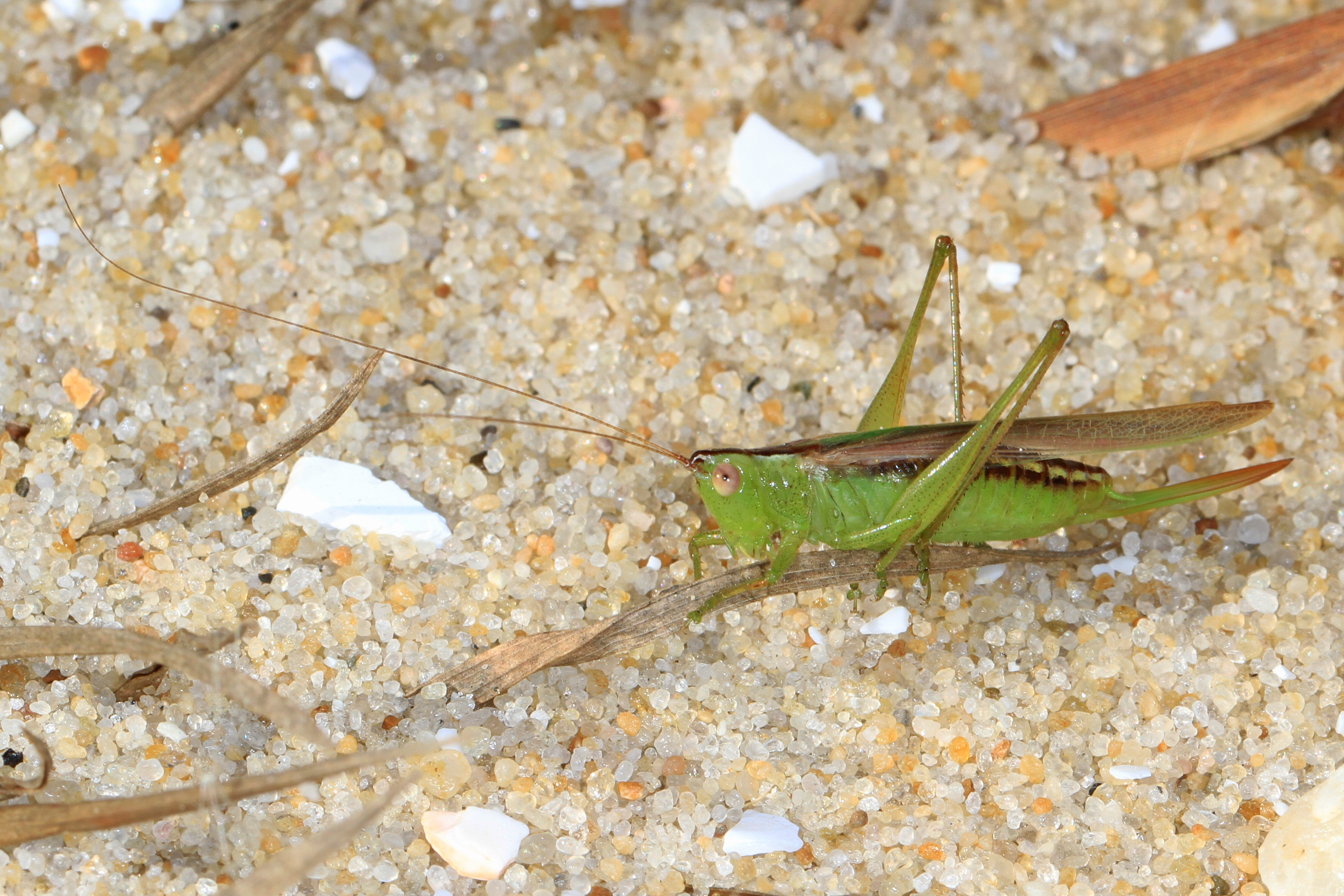

Scientific classification
- Kingdom: Animalia
- Phylum: Arthropoda
- Clade: Pancrustacea
- Class: Insecta
- Order: Orthoptera
- Suborder: Ensifera
- Family: Tettigoniidae
- Genus: Conocephalus
- Subgenus: Anisoptera
- Species: C. fasciatus

Binomial name
- Conocephalus fasciatus (De Geer, 1773)

= Conocephalus fasciatus =

Species of cricket-like animal

Conocephalus fasciatus, the slender meadow katydid, is a species of katydid of the family Tettigoniidae that is native to the United States and Canada.

== Habitat ==
Conocephalus fasciatus is commonly found year-round throughout the United States and in the southern parts of Canada. They are commonly found in grassy and weedy areas in a large range of habitats including pastures, open pine woods and roadsides.

== Diet ==
The diet of C. fasciatus mainly consists of grasses and grass seedheads, which are readily available in their habitats. It will also occasionally feed on small insects.

== Identification ==
It is a small, slender katydid with long, narrow wings that extend beyond its posterior. On average, C. fasciatus are 18–26 mm in length and are usually a combination of brown and green in color. In males, the cerci are green and have a stout tooth on the inner border as well as a tip that is weakly flattened. They have a straight ovipositor that is two-thirds the length of the hind femur. The Slender Meadow Katydid has a soft song that is a sequence of alternating ticks and buzzes that vary in duration from 1–20 seconds.
