= Liara (disambiguation) =

Liara T'Soni is a character from the Mass Effect media franchise.

Liara may also refer to:

- Liara (katydid), a katydid genus in the tribe Agraeciini
- Liara Roux, American activist, author and sex worker
