= Palaeoagraecia =

Scientific classification
- Domain: Eukaryota
- Kingdom: Animalia
- Phylum: Arthropoda
- Class: Insecta
- Order: Orthoptera
- Suborder: Ensifera
- Family: Tettigoniidae
- Subfamily: Conocephalinae
- Tribe: Agraeciini
- Genus: Palaeoagraecia; Ingrisch, 1998

Genus of cricket-like animals

Palaeoagraecia is an Asian genus of bush crickets in the tribe Agraeciini, belonging to the 'conehead' subfamily Conocephalinae. Species have been recorded from Bangladesh, China, Korea, Japan, Indo-China, Malesia, New Guinea and western Pacific islands.

== Species ==
The Orthoptera Species File lists:

- Palaeoagraecia ascenda Ingrisch, 1998
- Palaeoagraecia brunnea Ingrisch, 1998 - type species (locality Thailand)
- Palaeoagraecia chyzeri Bolívar, 1905
- Palaeoagraecia luteus Matsumura & Shiraki, 1908
- Palaeoagraecia philippina Karny, 1926
