= Rhytidogyne =

Scientific classification
- Domain: Eukaryota
- Kingdom: Animalia
- Phylum: Arthropoda
- Class: Insecta
- Order: Orthoptera
- Suborder: Ensifera
- Family: Tettigoniidae
- Subfamily: Conocephalinae
- Tribe: Agraeciini
- Subtribe: Liarina
- Genus: Rhytidogyne; Karny, 1907
- Species: R. griffinii

Binomial name
- Rhytidogyne griffinii Karny, 1907

Genus of cricket-like animals

Rhytidogyne is an Asian genus of bush crickets in the tribe Agraeciini, belonging to the 'conehead' subfamily Conocephalinae.

The Orthoptera Species File lists this genus as monotypic with the single species Rhytidogyne griffinii which is found only in Vietnam.
