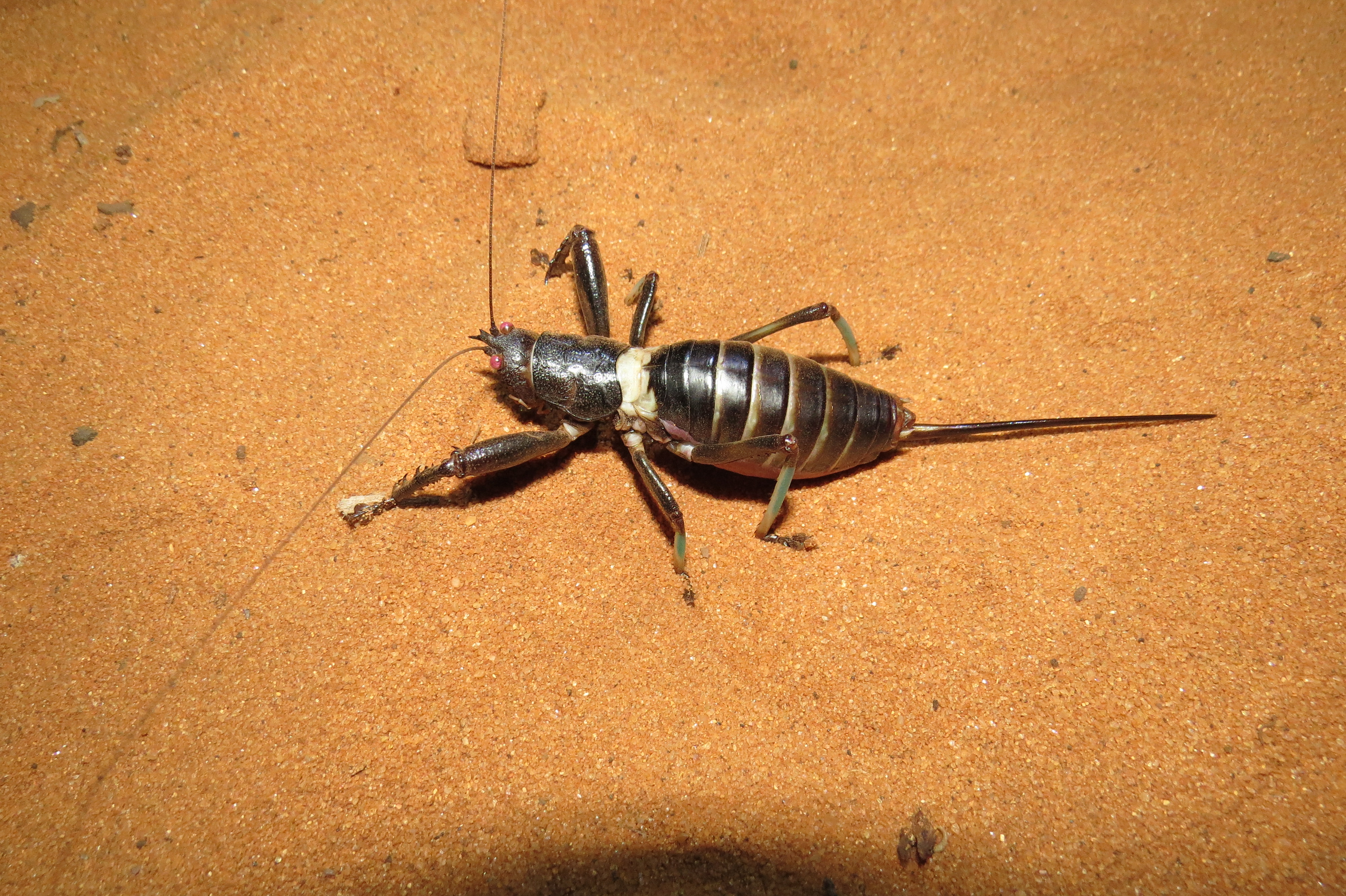
- In Parc Mosa, Ifaty, Madagascar

Scientific classification
- Kingdom: Animalia
- Phylum: Arthropoda
- Clade: Pancrustacea
- Class: Insecta
- Order: Orthoptera
- Suborder: Ensifera
- Family: Tettigoniidae
- Subfamily: Conocephalinae
- Tribe: Euconchophorini
- Genus: Colossopus
- Species: C. grandidieri

Binomial name
- Colossopus grandidieri Saussure, 1899

= Colossopus grandidieri =

Species of bush cricket

Kung-fu cricket (Colossopus grandidieri) is a nocturnal bush cricket endemic to Madagascar.. The genus is recognized by, among other things, the horn-like structure on the head, with three spines, one of which is significantly longer than the others. The genus contains two other species: C. parvicavus, which is smaller, and C. redtenbacheri, which is brighter in color.

== Description and behavior ==
C. grandidieri is large in size, has three spine-like structure on its head which are dark in color. When confronted, adults rear up on their hind legs, spread their forelegs, and open their mandibles, ready to strike, in a defensive posture. Adult males make a shrill noise when in this position, while adult females are silent. Another difference between sexes includes the labrum ("upper lip"), which is orange-red in females and yellow-orange in males. Females lay pale brown, cigar-shaped eggs that are deposited singly in soil, measuring only 6 mm when laid and swelling in size as they develop over three months to a year. Egg development is thought to be regulated by rainfall. Females lay 150 to 200 eggs in a lifetime.

This species appears to be omnivorous. It is the only member of its genus that has been bred successfully in captivity. The diet includes leaves, fruit, living and dead insects (including individuals of its own kind), and processed food including dog food and fish flakes. The diet in its natural environment is less well known.

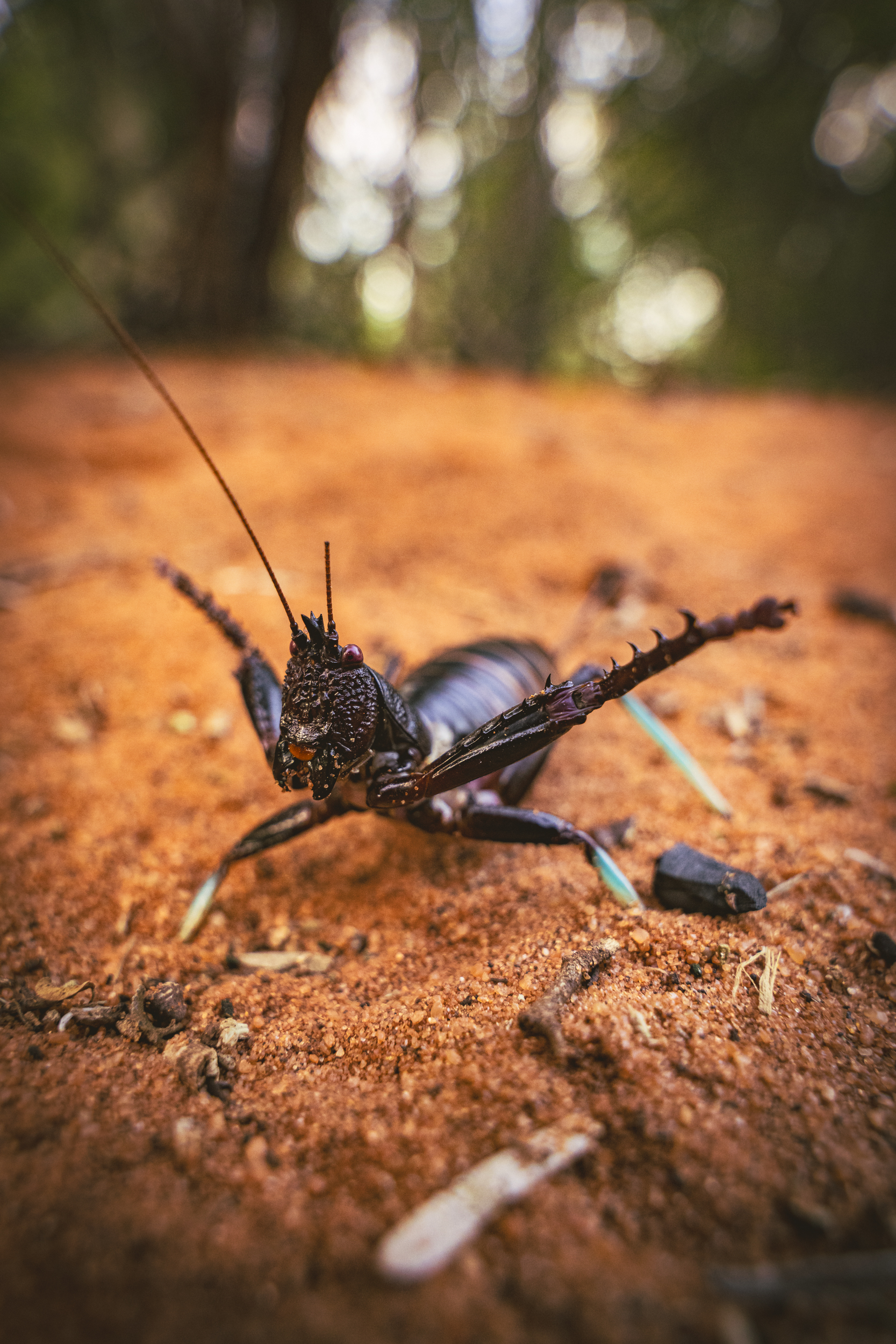
The bush cricket species Colossopus grandidieri in its defensive posture

C. grandidieri has three spines on its head, one of which is clearly larger. The genus Oncodopus has only one large spine and the genus Malagasopus has three spines but the structure is smaller. For more certain determination the species key is needed.

== Distribution and habitat ==
The range is clearly concentrated in the ecoregion defined as the Madagascar spiny thickets, which is classified as a semi-arid and hot climate in the Köppen climate classification. This is the region that receives least rainfall in Madagascar.

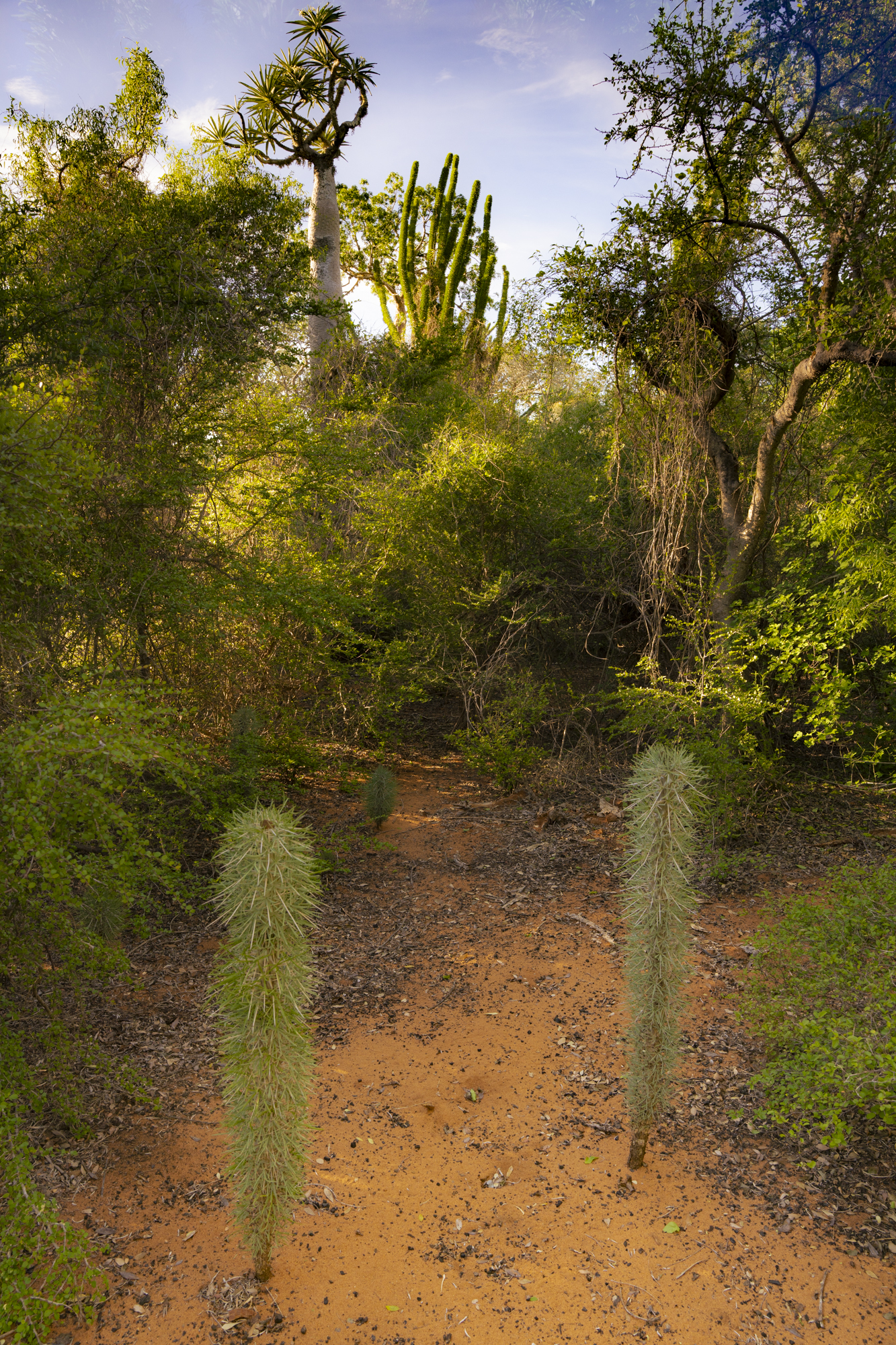
Madagascar spiny thickets
