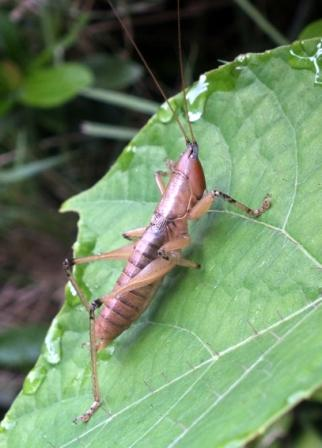
- Anelytra (Lichnofugia) petria

Scientific classification
- Kingdom: Animalia
- Phylum: Arthropoda
- Class: Insecta
- Order: Orthoptera
- Suborder: Ensifera
- Family: Tettigoniidae
- Genus: Anelytra
- Subgenus: Lichnofugia; Ingrisch, 1998

= Lichnofugia =

Genus of cricket-like animals

Lichnofugia is an Asian subgenus of bush crickets in the tribe Agraeciini: now placed within the genus Anelytra; they belonging to the 'conehead' subfamily Conocephalinae.

== Species ==
The Orthoptera Species File lists:

1. Lichnofugia cornuta Ingrisch, 1998
2. Lichnofugia petria Ingrisch, 1998
3. Lichnofugia rufa Ingrisch, 1998
4. Lichnofugia symfioma Ingrisch, 1998
5. Lichnofugia umshingensis (Hajong, 2014)
