= Acrodonta =

Acrodonta may refer to:

- Acrodonta (lizard), a clade in the suborder Iguania
- Acrodonta (katydid), a katydid genus in the tribe Agraeciini

== See also ==
- Acrodont, a formation of the teeth whereby the teeth are consolidated with the summit of the alveolar ridge of the jaw without sockets
