= Liaromorpha =

Scientific classification
- Domain: Eukaryota
- Kingdom: Animalia
- Phylum: Arthropoda
- Class: Insecta
- Order: Orthoptera
- Suborder: Ensifera
- Family: Tettigoniidae
- Subfamily: Conocephalinae
- Tribe: Agraeciini
- Subtribe: Liarina
- Genus: Liaromorpha; Gorochov, 1994

Genus of cricket-like animals

Liaromorpha is an Asian genus of bush crickets in the tribe Agraeciini, belonging to the 'conehead' subfamily Conocephalinae. Species records are mostly from Indo-China.

== Species ==
The Orthoptera Species File lists:

- Liaromorpha aspinosa Ingrisch, 1998
- Liaromorpha buonluoiensis Gorochov, 1994 - type species
- Liaromorpha natalicium Gorochov, 2007
- Liaromorpha nitida Ingrisch, 1998
