= Mesagraecia =

Scientific classification
- Domain: Eukaryota
- Kingdom: Animalia
- Phylum: Arthropoda
- Class: Insecta
- Order: Orthoptera
- Suborder: Ensifera
- Family: Tettigoniidae
- Subfamily: Conocephalinae
- Tribe: Agraeciini
- Genus: Mesagraecia; Ingrisch, 1998

Genus of cricket-like animals

Mesagraecia is an Asian genus of bush crickets in the tribe Agraeciini, belonging to the 'conehead' subfamily Conocephalinae. Records to date have all been from Indochina.

== Species ==
The Orthoptera Species File lists:

- Mesagraecia bicolor Ingrisch, 1998 - type species - locality Chanthaburi, Thailand
- Mesagraecia gorochovi Ingrisch, 1998
- Mesagraecia larutensis Tan, Ingrisch & Kamaruddin, 2015
- Mesagraecia laticauda (Karny, 1926)
