= Anthracites =

Anthracites may refer to:

- Anthracites (katydid), a katydid genus in the tribe Agraeciini
- Anthracite, a hard, compact variety of coal with a submetallic luster
