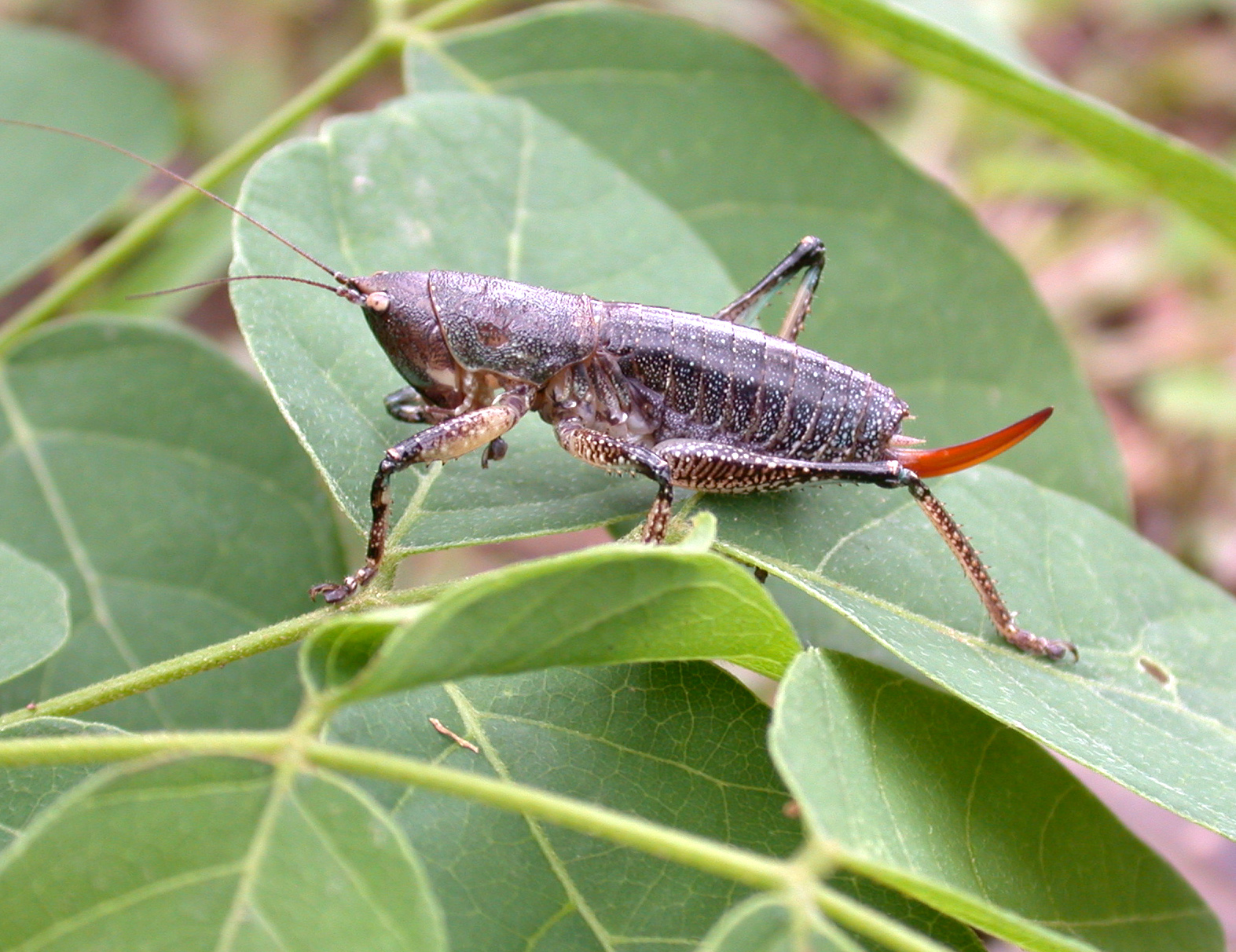
- Anelytra nigrifrons female

Scientific classification
- Domain: Eukaryota
- Kingdom: Animalia
- Phylum: Arthropoda
- Class: Insecta
- Order: Orthoptera
- Suborder: Ensifera
- Family: Tettigoniidae
- Subfamily: Conocephalinae
- Tribe: Agraeciini
- Subtribe: Liarina
- Genus: Anelytra; Redtenbacher, 1891

= Anelytra =

Genus of cricket-like animals

Anelytra is an Asian genus of bush crickets in the tribe Agraeciini, belonging to the 'conehead' subfamily Conocephalinae.

== Species ==
The Orthoptera Species File lists:

subgenus Anelytra Redtenbacher, 1891 (synonym Euanelytra Gorochov, 1994)

- Anelytra adjacens Gorochov, 1994
- Anelytra boku Helfert & Sänger, 1997
- Anelytra compressa Shi & Qiu, 2009
- Anelytra concolor Redtenbacher, 1891
- Anelytra curvata Ingrisch, 1998
- Anelytra dividata Ingrisch, 1998
- Anelytra elongata Ingrisch, 1998
- Anelytra eunigrifrons Ingrisch, 1998
- Anelytra fastigata Ingrisch, 1990
- Anelytra furcata Ingrisch, 1998
- Anelytra gonioda Ingrisch, 1998
- Anelytra hainanensis Shi, 2015
- Anelytra indigena Gorochov, 1994
- Anelytra jinghonga Shi & Qiu, 2009
- Anelytra laotica Ingrisch, 1998
- Anelytra localis Gorochov, 1994
- Anelytra malaya Ingrisch, 1998
- Anelytra multicurvata Shi & Qiu, 2009
- Anelytra nigrifrons Redtenbacher, 1891 - type species
- Anelytra punctata Redtenbacher, 1891
- Anelytra robusta Ingrisch, 1990
- Anelytra spinia Shi & Qiu, 2009
- Anelytra styliana Ingrisch, 1998
- Anelytra tristellata Ingrisch, 1990
- Anelytra unica Ingrisch, 1998

subgenus Lichnofugia Ingrisch, 1998
subgenus Perianelytra Gorochov, 1994

1. Anelytra propria Gorochov, 1994
  1. subspecies A. propria pellucida Ingrisch, 1998

subgenus Stenanelytra

Auth. Gorochov, 2020 - Indochina, Philippines

1. Anelytra angusticauda Gorochov, 2020
2. Anelytra busuanga Gorochov, 2020
3. Anelytra nigra (Ingrisch, 1998)
