= Lesina =

Lesina may refer to:

== Places and jurisdictions ==
=== Croatia ===
- Hvar, an island in Split–Dalmatia County, also known as Lesina in Italian and English
  - Hvar (city), the largest city on the island

=== Italy ===
- Lesina, Apulia, a comune in the Province of Foggia
  - Roman Catholic Diocese of Lesina, now a Latin titular see
- Lake Lesina, a lake in the Province of Foggia, Apulia
- Foggia Airfield Complex, a military airfield in the Province of Foggia of which Lesina airfield was a part

== Other ==
- Lesina (katydid), an insect genus in the family Tettigoniidae
