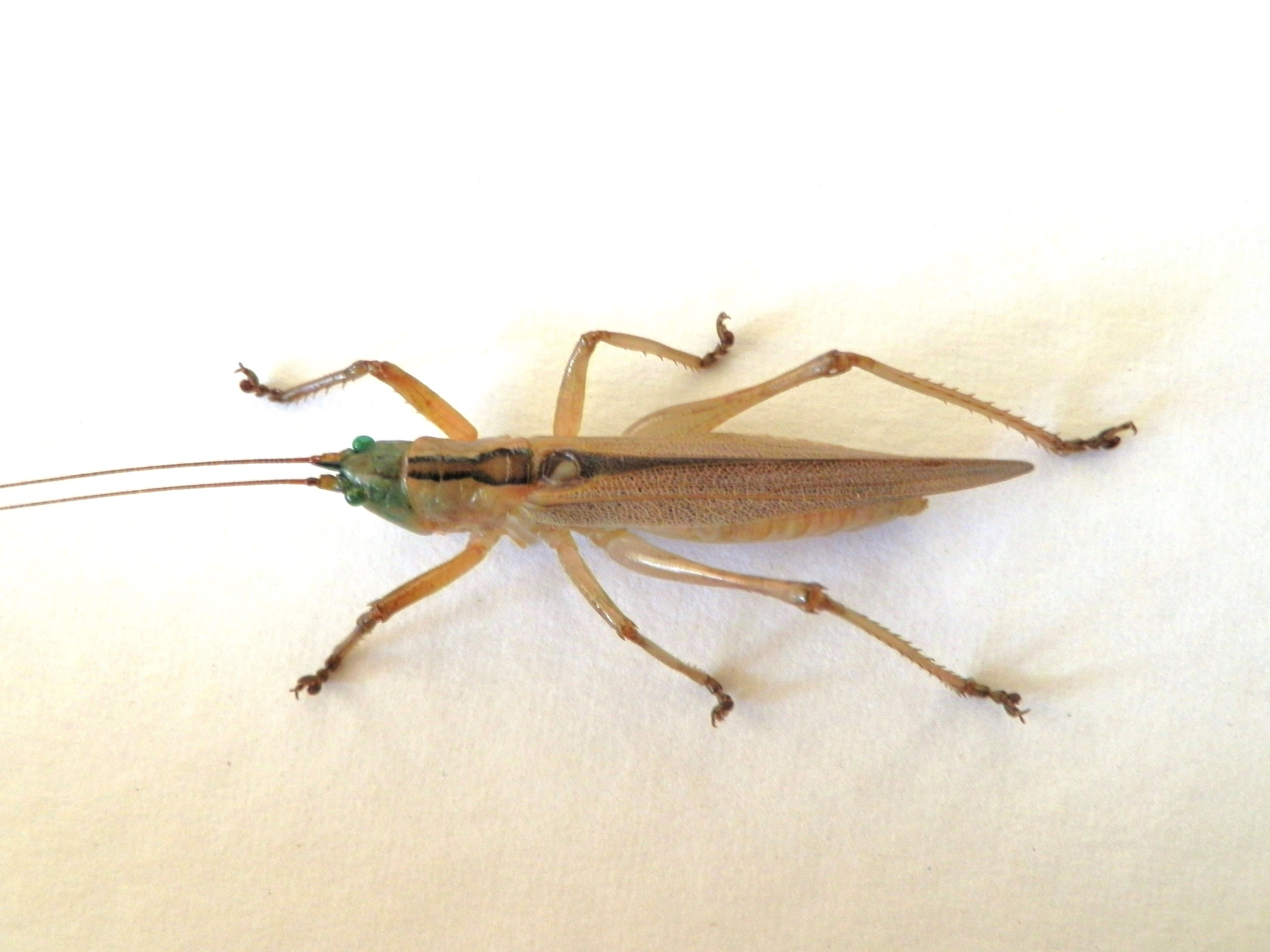
- E. levyi male, dorsal aspect

Scientific classification
- Domain: Eukaryota
- Kingdom: Animalia
- Phylum: Arthropoda
- Class: Insecta
- Order: Orthoptera
- Suborder: Ensifera
- Family: Tettigoniidae
- Subfamily: Conocephalinae
- Tribe: Agraeciini
- Genus: Erechthis; Bolívar, 1888

= Erechthis =

Genus of insects

Erechthis is a genus of Caribbean katydids in the tribe Agraeciini. They are distributed across a few islands in the Greater Antilles region.

There are three species:

- Erechthis ayiti De Luca and Morris, 2016 ― found in Haiti
- Erechthis gundlachi Bolívar, 1888 ― found in Cuba and the Dominican Republic
- Erechthis levyi De Luca and Morris, 2016 ― found in The Bahamas
