= Coptaspis elegans =

Scientific classification
- Domain: Eukaryota
- Kingdom: Animalia
- Phylum: Arthropoda
- Class: Insecta
- Order: Orthoptera
- Suborder: Ensifera
- Family: Tettigoniidae
- Genus: Coptaspis
- Species: C. elegans

Binomial name
- Coptaspis elegans Willemse, C., 1966

Species of cricket-like animal

Coptaspis elegans is an Australian species of bush cricket in the tribe Agraeciini.
