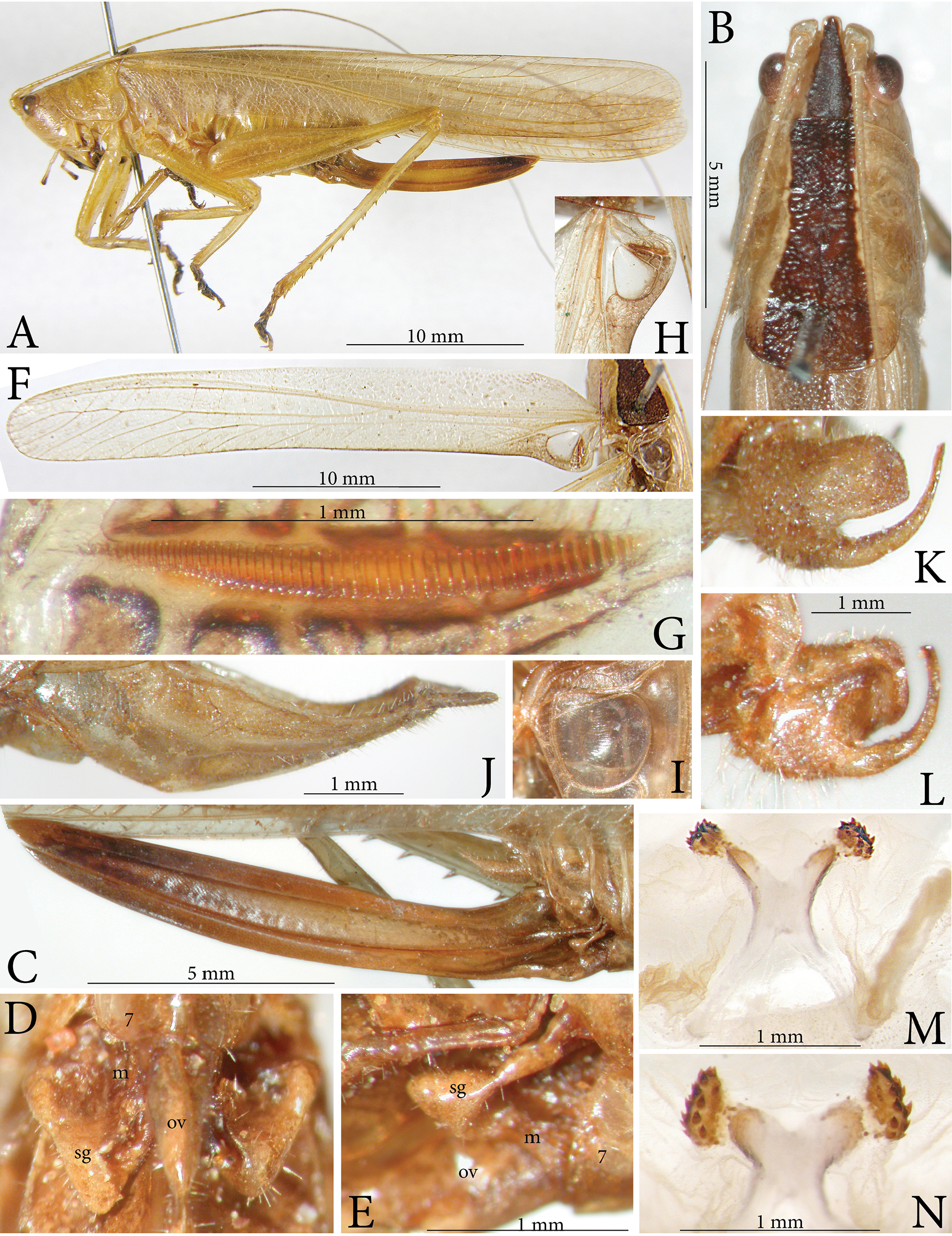
- Pseudosubria assamensis

Scientific classification
- Domain: Eukaryota
- Kingdom: Animalia
- Phylum: Arthropoda
- Class: Insecta
- Order: Orthoptera
- Suborder: Ensifera
- Family: Tettigoniidae
- Subfamily: Conocephalinae
- Tribe: Agraeciini
- Subtribe: Liarina
- Genus: Pseudosubria; Karny, 1926

= Pseudosubria =

Genus of cricket-like animals

Pseudosubria is a genus of Asian bush crickets in the tribe Agraeciini, belonging to the 'conehead' subfamily Conocephalinae. Species records are from Indochina and Malesia.

== Species ==
The Orthoptera Species File lists:

1. Pseudosubria assamensis Ingrisch, 2020
2. Pseudosubria bispinosa Ingrisch, 1998 (3 subspecies)
3. Pseudosubria decipiens Karny, 1926 - type species
4. Pseudosubria falcata Ingrisch, 1998
5. Pseudosubria hastata Ingrisch & Shishodia, 1997
6. Pseudosubria transversa Ingrisch, 1998
7. Pseudosubria triangula Ingrisch, 1998
