= Sialaiana =

Scientific classification
- Domain: Eukaryota
- Kingdom: Animalia
- Phylum: Arthropoda
- Class: Insecta
- Order: Orthoptera
- Suborder: Ensifera
- Family: Tettigoniidae
- Subfamily: Conocephalinae
- Tribe: Agraeciini
- Subtribe: Liarina
- Genus: Sialaiana; Ingrisch, 1998

Genus of cricket-like animals

Sialaiana is an Asian genus of bush crickets in the tribe Agraeciini, belonging to the 'conehead' subfamily Conocephalinae.

== Species ==
The Orthoptera Species File lists:

1. Sialaiana sigfridi Gorochov, 2008
2. Sialaiana transiens Ingrisch, 1998
  - type species (locality near Buon Luoi village, Gia Lai Province, Viet Nam)
