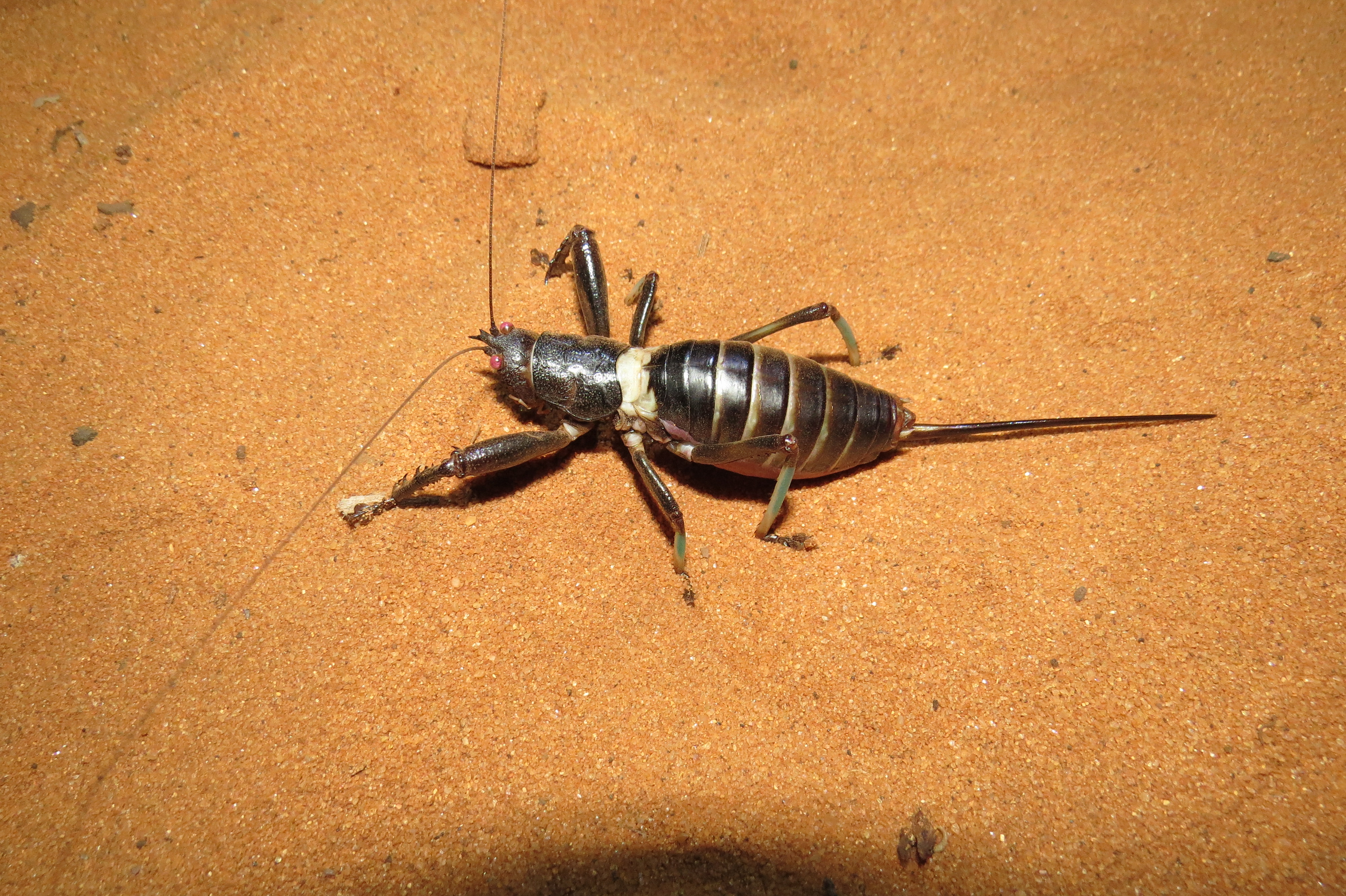
- Colossopus grandidieri

Scientific classification
- Kingdom: Animalia
- Phylum: Arthropoda
- Class: Insecta
- Order: Orthoptera
- Suborder: Ensifera
- Family: Tettigoniidae
- Subfamily: Conocephalinae
- Tribe: Euconchophorini
- Genus: Colossopus; Saussure, 1899

Synonyms
- Collosopus Karny, 1907

= Colossopus =

Genus of bush crickets

Colossopus is a genus of bush crickets in the tribe Euconchophorini, belonging to the 'conehead' subfamily Conocephalinae. This genus is endemic to Madagascar.

== Species ==
The Orthoptera Species File lists:

1. Colossopus grandidieri Saussure, 1899 - type species
2. Colossopus parvicavus Ünal & Beccaloni, 2017
3. Colossopus redtenbacheri Brongniart, 1897
