= Labugama pearsoni =

Scientific classification
- Domain: Eukaryota
- Kingdom: Animalia
- Phylum: Arthropoda
- Class: Insecta
- Order: Orthoptera
- Suborder: Ensifera
- Family: Tettigoniidae
- Genus: Labugama; Henry, 1932
- Species: L. pearsoni

Binomial name
- Labugama pearsoni Henry, 1932

Species of cricket-like animal

Labugama pearsoni is a species of spine-headed katydid found in Sri Lanka. It is the only species in the genus Labugama.
