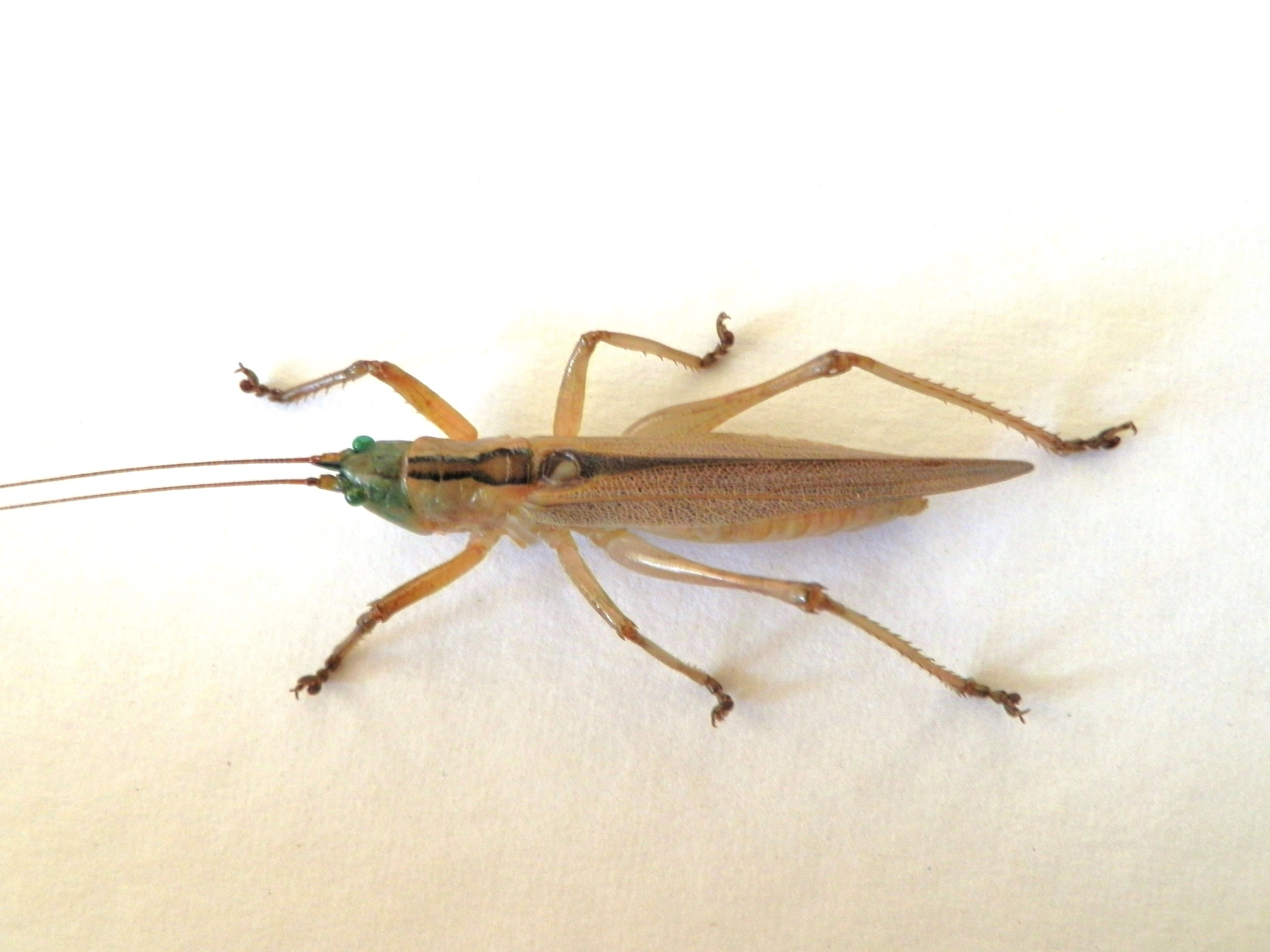
- Erechthis levyi male, dorsal aspect

Scientific classification
- Domain: Eukaryota
- Kingdom: Animalia
- Phylum: Arthropoda
- Class: Insecta
- Order: Orthoptera
- Suborder: Ensifera
- Family: Tettigoniidae
- Genus: Erechthis
- Species: E. levyi

Binomial name
- Erechthis levyi De Luca and Morris, 2016

= Erechthis levyi =

Blue-faced katydid

Species of cricket-like animal

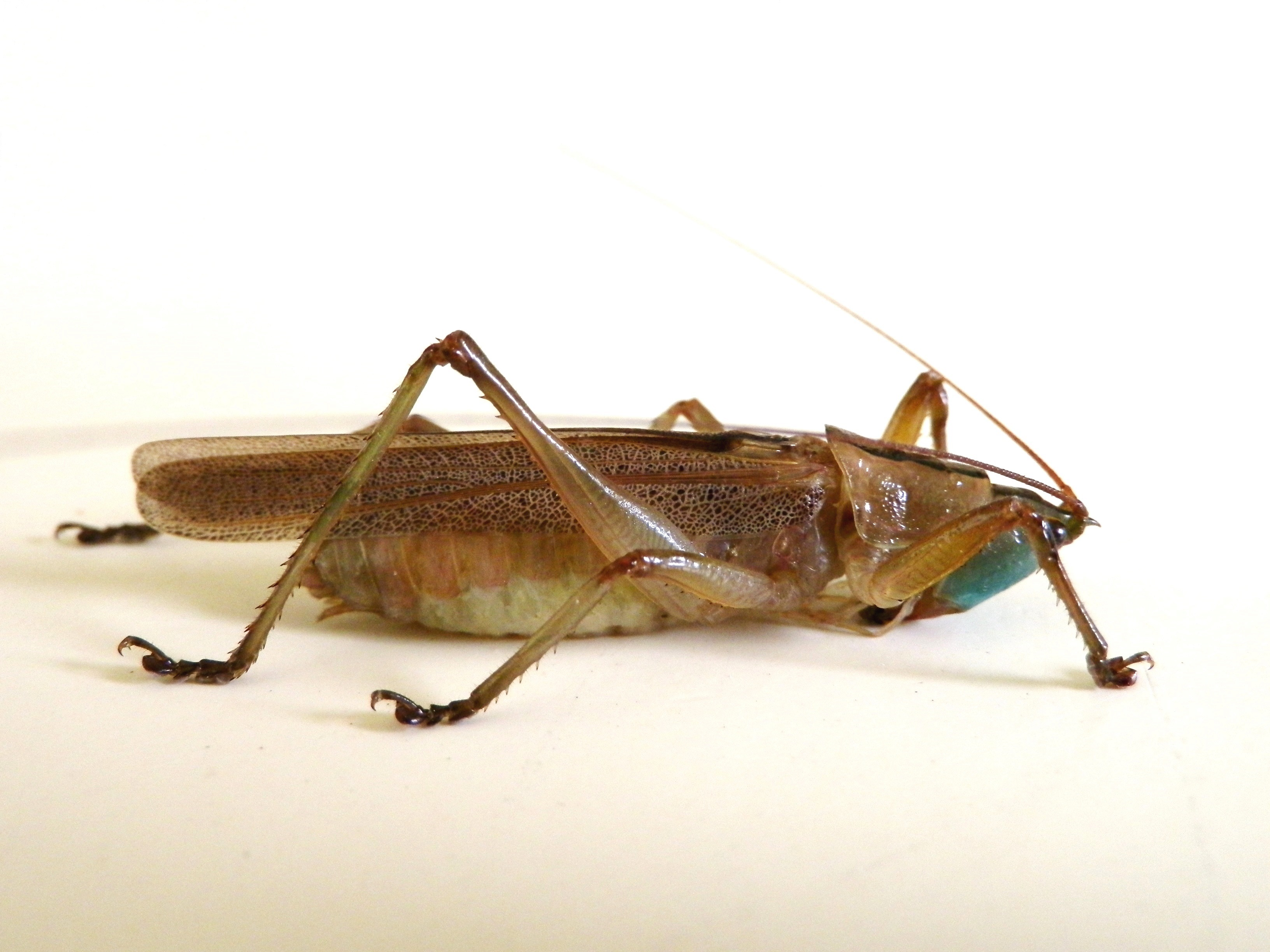
Erechthis levyi male, lateral aspect

Acoustic mate attraction call of male Erechthis levyi katydid

Erechthis levyi, the blue-faced katydid or Eleuthera rhino katydid, is a katydid found in The Bahamas. Currently, it is described from specimens collected only on the island of Eleuthera. They are light brown in color throughout the body, but exhibit a bright turquoise-blue face and bear a prominent spine on the vertex of the head between the eyes, hence the common names. It is tentatively considered an endemic species to The Bahamas, as no specimens are recorded from Cuba or Hispaniola, where other Erechthis species occur. The species was named in honor of Leon Levy, a prominent Wall Street financier and philanthropist who spent much time on Eleuthera and was an avid admirer of the island's flora and natural beauty.

== Description ==
Erechthis levyi is light-brown in color with a prominent dark brown stripe running dorsally along the midline from the thorax to the tips of the wings. The face is turquoise-blue in color as are the distal tips of the legs. The blue coloration disappears in preserved specimens. Adults measure between 46–51 mm (1.8–2.0 in) in body length, with females about 5 mm (0.20 in) longer than males. Compared to the other two species in the genus (E. gundlachi and E. ayiti), E. levyi is more robust in overall body shape, and females bear a much longer ovipositor, about 22 mm (0.87 in), compared to those of either of the female congeners, 14–17 mm (0.55–0.67 in).

== Distribution and habitat ==
Erechthis levyi is presently described from specimens collected on Eleuthera in The Bahamas. Individuals were first observed in 2013 at the Leon Levy Native Plant Preserve, a national park managed by the Bahamas National Trust. Additional sampling in the future will enable a more thorough determination of its complete range throughout the Bahamian archipelago. The other two species in this genus are described from specimens found only on Cuba and Hispaniola. No specimens of E. levyi are recorded from Cuba or Hispaniola, nor have its congeners been found in The Bahamas. At present time then, E. levyi is tentatively considered an endemic species to The Bahamas.

The habitat of E. levyi is forest coppice, with the most common plants being poisonwood (Metopium toxiferum), pigeon plum (Coccoloba diversifolia) and gum elemi (Bursera simaruba). There are also several species of palm, such as buccaneer (Pseudophoenix sargentii), coconut (Cocos nucifera), sabal (Sabal palmetto), silver top (Coccothrinax argentata) and thatch (Thrinax morrisii). Interestingly, specimens of E. levyi have only been observed occurring on palm trees. Whether this represents a preferred plant host requires further determination.

== Taxonomy ==
The genus Erechthis is originally described from specimens collected on Cuba. The only species in the genus until 2016 was E. gundlachi which has since been found occurring in the Dominican Republic on the island of Hispaniola. When examining museum specimens of E. gundlachi to describe E. levyi, it was determined that several specimens were in fact morphologically distinct from the E. gundlachi holotype. Accordingly, these were subsequently identified as a new species – E. ayiti. All specimens described as E. ayiti were collected from Haiti.

== Behaviour ==
Little is known about the natural history and behaviour of E. levyi. Few observations have been made of individuals in their natural habitat thus far. Like most nocturnal katydids, blue-faced katydids hide themselves well in the vegetation, but they also tend to be situated high up, >2 m (6 ft 7 in), on palm trees out of easy reach. Most specimens collected at the Levy Preserve have been males, and were only found by ear from tracking the acoustic mate attraction call of a singing male to its source. Individuals remain well-hidden during the day so where they occur is unknown. One hypothesis is that they use bromeliad plants as daytime refugia, which are extremely abundant throughout the coppice forests. The blue-green coloration of bromeliad leaves is similar to their turquoise-blue face, and therefore one possibility is that individuals hide "face up" while concealing their body at the base of the leaves, exposing the head to blend in with the surrounding vegetation.

As with many species of katydids, male E. levyi stridulate to produce an acoustic mating song to attract females. In the time domain, the song appears as a steadily repeated sequence of short chirps, each composed of a series of 3 – 5 pulse trains. In the frequency domain, the spectrum combines an isolated lower audio peak around 7 kHz (range: 6.5 – 8.5 kHz) with a more extensive band from 11 – 24 kHz.
