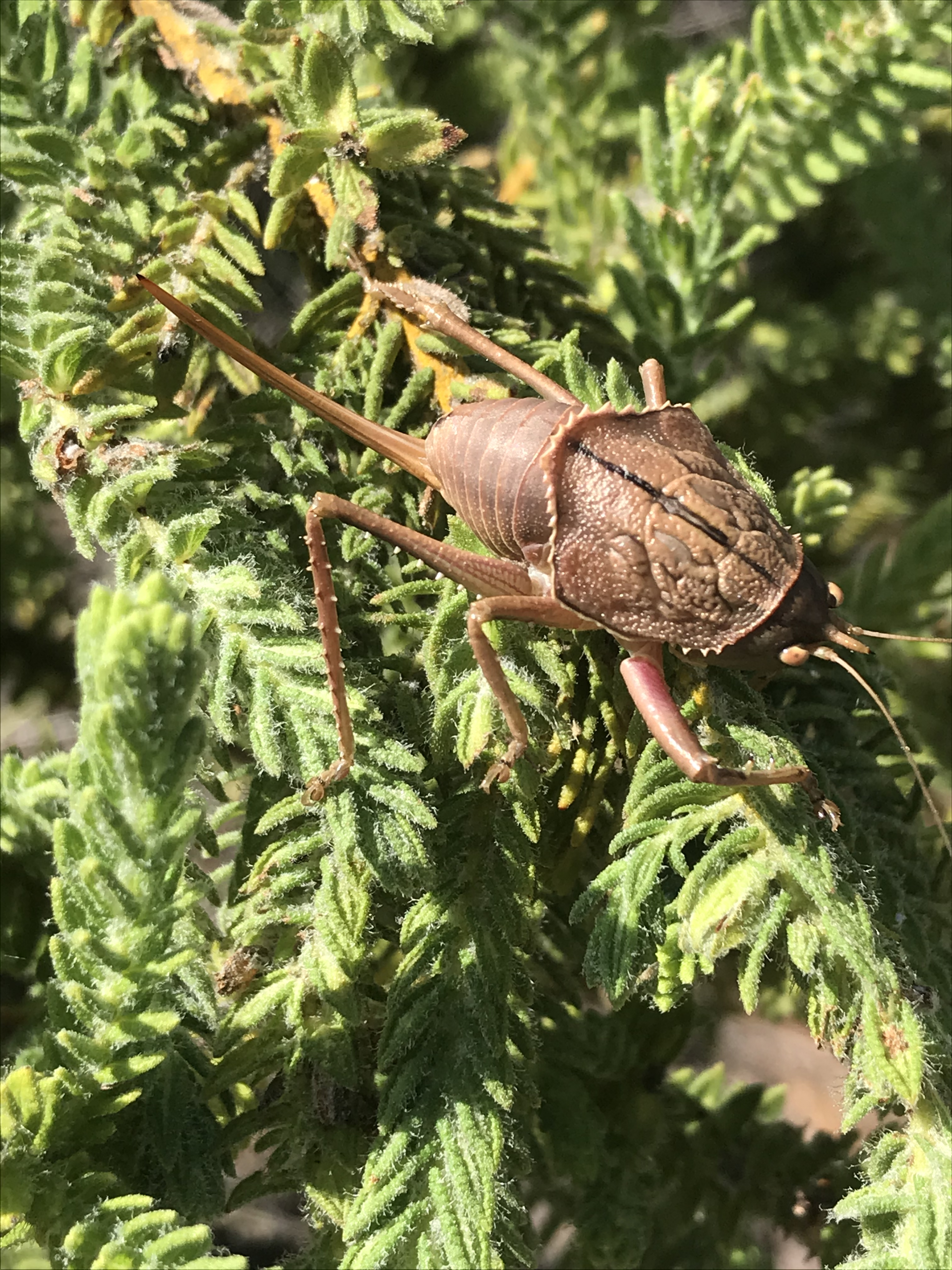
- Armadillagraecia mataranka

Scientific classification
- Domain: Eukaryota
- Kingdom: Animalia
- Phylum: Arthropoda
- Class: Insecta
- Order: Orthoptera
- Suborder: Ensifera
- Family: Tettigoniidae
- Tribe: Armadillagraeciini
- Genus: Armadillagraecia; Rentz, Su, Ueshima & Robinson, 2010

Species
- Armadillagraecia mataranka Rentz, Su, Ueshima & Robinson, 2010; Armadillagraecia triodiae Rentz, Su, Ueshima & Robinson, 2010; Armadillagraecia yerilla Rentz, Su, Ueshima & Robinson, 2010

= Armadillagraecia =

Genus of katydids

Armadillagraecia is a genus of tettigoninae kadydids from the Conocephalinae family found in north Australian savannas, particularly in the wet season.
