= Conanalus =

Scientific classification
- Domain: Eukaryota
- Kingdom: Animalia
- Phylum: Arthropoda
- Class: Insecta
- Order: Orthoptera
- Suborder: Ensifera
- Family: Tettigoniidae
- Subfamily: Conocephalinae
- Tribe: Conocephalini
- Genus: Conanalus; Tinkham, 1943

Genus of cricket-like animals

Conanalus is an Asian genus of bush crickets in the tribe Conocephalini, of the 'conehead' subfamily Conocephalinae.

== Species ==
The Orthoptera Species File lists:

- Conanalus axinus Shi, Wang & Fu, 2005
- Conanalus bilobus Du, Song & Shi, 2015
- Conanalus brevicaudus Shi, Mao & Ou, 2008
- Conanalus pieli Tinkham, 1943 - type species (locality: Jiangxi, Kuling, China)
- Conanalus plicipennis Xia & Liu, 1990
- Conanalus robustus Shi, Mao & Ou, 2008
