= Odontoxiphidium =

Scientific classification
- Domain: Eukaryota
- Kingdom: Animalia
- Phylum: Arthropoda
- Class: Insecta
- Order: Orthoptera
- Suborder: Ensifera
- Family: Tettigoniidae
- Tribe: Conocephalini
- Genus: Odontoxiphidium; Morse, 1891
- Species: O. apterum

Binomial name
- Odontoxiphidium apterum Morse, 1901

Genus of cricket-like animals

Odontoxiphidium is a genus of meadow katydids in the family Tettigoniidae and tribe Conocephalini. There is one described species in Odontoxiphidium, O. apterum, from the South-Eastern USA.
