= Luzoniella signifrons =

Scientific classification
- Domain: Eukaryota
- Kingdom: Animalia
- Phylum: Arthropoda
- Class: Insecta
- Order: Orthoptera
- Suborder: Ensifera
- Family: Tettigoniidae
- Subfamily: Conocephalinae
- Tribe: Conocephalini
- Genus: Luzoniella; Karny, 1926
- Species: L. signifrons

Binomial name
- Luzoniella signifrons (Karny, 1920)

Synonyms
- Bakerella Karny, 1920

Species of cricket-like animal

Luzoniella signifrons is a species of "conehead" bush crickets or katydids, endemic to the Philippines. It is the only species in the genus Luzoniella: which is named after the northern island where the type locality, Mount Makiling is situated.
