= Coptaspis =

Scientific classification
- Domain: Eukaryota
- Kingdom: Animalia
- Phylum: Arthropoda
- Class: Insecta
- Order: Orthoptera
- Suborder: Ensifera
- Family: Tettigoniidae
- Subfamily: Conocephalinae
- Tribe: Agraeciini
- Genus: Coptaspis; Redtenbacher, 1891

Species
- Coptaspis brevipennis Redtenbacher, 1891; Coptaspis crassinervosa Redtenbacher, 1891; Coptaspis elegans Willemse, C., 1966; Coptaspis lateralis (Erichson, 1842)

Genus of cricket-like animals

Coptaspis is a genus of bush crickets in the tribe Agraeciini, containing the following species:

- Coptaspis brevipennis Redtenbacher, 1891
- Coptaspis crassinervosa Redtenbacher, 1891
- Coptaspis elegans Willemse, 1966
- Coptaspis lateralis Erichson, 1842
