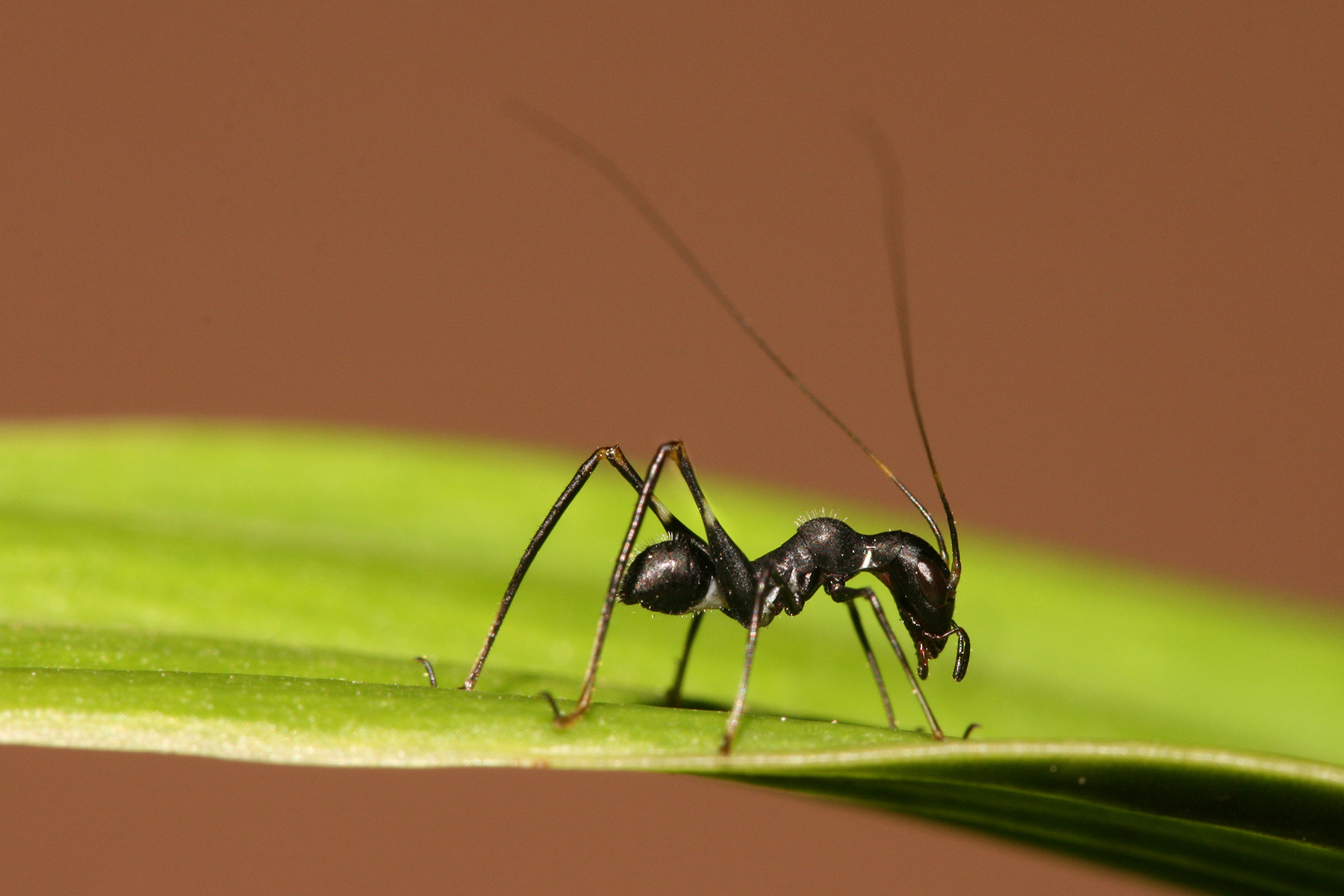
- Macroxiphus species mimicking an ant

Scientific classification
- Kingdom: Animalia
- Phylum: Arthropoda
- Class: Insecta
- Order: Orthoptera
- Suborder: Ensifera
- Family: Tettigoniidae
- Subfamily: Conocephalinae
- Tribe: Agraeciini
- Subtribe: Liarina
- Genus: Macroxiphus; Pictet, 1888

Synonyms
- Odontocoryphus Karny, 1907

= Macroxiphus =

Genus of orthopterans whose immature stage mimics ants

Macroxiphus is a small genus of bush crickets or katydids distributed in Southeast Asia and Micronesia. The nymphs (immature stages) of the insects mimic ants.

== Species ==
Species include:

- Macroxiphus nasicornis Pictet, 1888 - type species
- Macroxiphus sumatranus (Haan, 1843)

== Camouflage and mimicry ==
Young instars of Macroxiphus, such as M. sumatranus, have an "uncanny resemblance" to ants, extending to their black coloration, remarkably perfect antlike shape, and convincingly antlike behaviour. Their long antennae are camouflaged to appear short, being black only at the base, and they are vibrated like ant antennae. Larger instars suddenly change into typical-looking katydids, and are entirely nocturnal, while the adult has bright warning coloration.
