= Whore of New York =

2021 book by Liara Roux

Whore of New York: A Confession
- First edition cover
- Author: Liara Roux
- Language: English
- Genre: memoir
- Published: October 12, 2021
- Publisher: Repeater Books
- Publication place: United States
- ISBN: 978-1-913462-56-7

Whore of New York: A Confession is a novella-sized memoir and tell-all personal account released in 2021 by debut author Liara Roux, detailing her early life and her voluntary decision to become a sex worker, alongside experiences of abuse that influenced her. The book, which features a wide variety of taboo and controversial topics, has had mixed reviews in feminist and literary circles, owing largely to Roux's candid admissions.

== Synopsis ==
Liara Roux, an autistic resident of New York City's Upper East Side, recalls her childhood of conservative Christian surroundings and an abusive father, in juxtaposition with her latent desire to be involved with prostitution. As an adult, Roux is sexually abused in a lesbian relationship with her partner, and finds solace in the practice of sex work, even when her sexual experiences with clients are flawed. Roux raises questions about sex and sexuality as commodities, bodily autonomy, sexual consent, and the worth of the individual in a collective western society. She also tells of her medical conditions in life, including excruciating migraines, and her poor experience when seeking proper healthcare. The book continues with various personal accounts of Roux's experiences with clients, as she seeks independence from her partner after a bad marriage.

== Critical reception ==
Whore of New York received praise for its candid style and individuality. Molly Young of The New York Times said of the book, "Roux has zero interest in pretending that her experience is typical of her profession. This memoir, like all memoirs, is about the particularities of an individual life. It’s not about the state of the sex worker in America. Roux likes her work, but that doesn’t mean it is without discomfort, anxiety, alienation and fear." Tracy Clark-Flory, writing for Jezebel, noted the human rights aspects of the book, saying, "the stigma that sex workers face in society makes us a lot more vulnerable. A more honest telling of sex work, and the experience of it, can really capture why it’s so important that sex workers be granted these rights."
