= Liara Roux =

American author, sex worker, human rights activist and independent adult film maker

- Occupations: author, sex worker, indie porn director, human rights activist

Liara Roux is an American author, sex worker, pornography director, internet personality and sex workers' rights activist.

== Career ==
Roux is a high-end escort and supports the "decriminalization and protection of consensual adult activity including queer and sex worker rights and safety worldwide". In their view, sex workers can be described as a marginalized group, who were endangered by SESTA and received no benefits from it. Roux was prominently against Tumblr's decision to ban porn from their platform.

They have written for Vice Media and HuffPost. Their first book, Whore of New York: A Confession, was published in October 2021.

== Personal life ==
Roux is both queer and genderqueer. Roux has stated that she uses "she/her pronouns in advertising as Liara Roux, but I use he/him/they/them in my personal life". She was diagnosed with autism early in life.

== Publications ==
- Whore of New York: A Confession. London: Repeater Books. 2021. ISBN 978-1-9134-6261-1.
