= Liara (katydid) =

Scientific classification
- Domain: Eukaryota
- Kingdom: Animalia
- Phylum: Arthropoda
- Class: Insecta
- Order: Orthoptera
- Suborder: Ensifera
- Family: Tettigoniidae
- Subfamily: Conocephalinae
- Tribe: Agraeciini
- Subtribe: Liarina
- Genus: Liara; Redtenbacher, 1891

Genus of cricket-like animals

Liara is an Asian genus of bush crickets in the tribe Agraeciini, belonging to the 'conehead' subfamily Conocephalinae.

== Distribution ==
Species of Liara can be found in Indo-China and Malesia, including the Philippines.

== Species ==
The Orthoptera Species File lists:
Subgenus Acanthocoryphus Karny, 1907

- Liara brevis Ingrisch, 1998
- Liara brongniarti Karny, 1907
- Liara mindanensis Hebard, 1922

Subgenus Liara Redtenbacher, 1891

- Liara alata Ingrisch, 1998
- Liara baviensis Gorochov, 1994
- Liara floricercus Ingrisch, 1990
- Liara lobatus Redtenbacher, 1891
- Liara magna Ingrisch, 1990
- Liara monkra Ingrisch, 1998
- Liara rufescens Redtenbacher, 1891 - type species
- Liara tamdaoensis Gorochov, 1994
- Liara tenebra Ingrisch, 1998
- Liara tramlapensis Gorochov, 1994
- Liara tulyensis Gorochov, 1994
