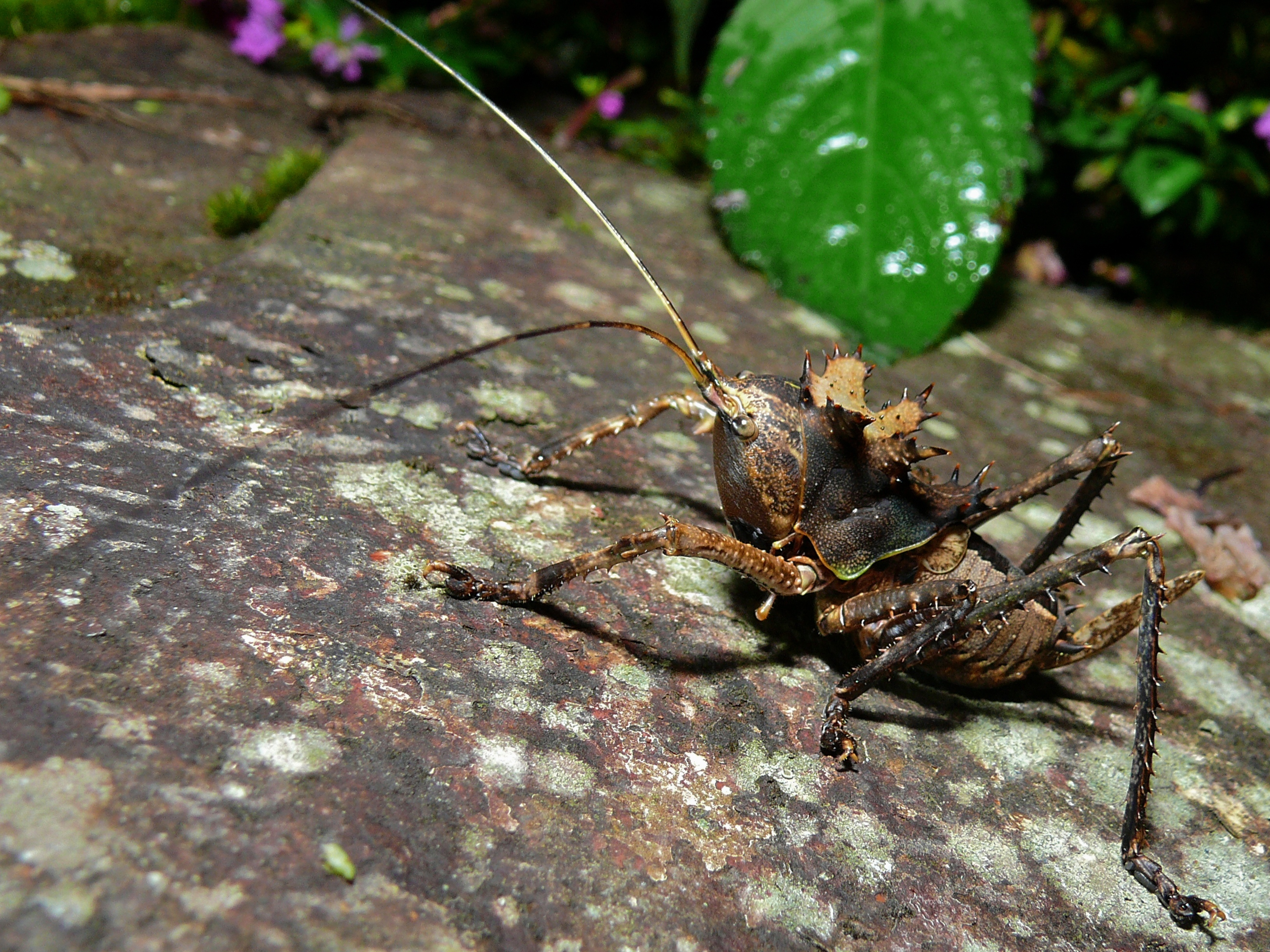
- A female nymph of Lesina karnyi

Scientific classification
- Kingdom: Animalia
- Phylum: Arthropoda
- Class: Insecta
- Order: Orthoptera
- Suborder: Ensifera
- Family: Tettigoniidae
- Subfamily: Conocephalinae
- Tribe: Agraeciini
- Subtribe: Eumegalodontina
- Genus: Lesina; Walker, 1869

Synonyms
- Megalodon Brullé, 1835; Eumegalodon Brongniart, 1892

= Lesina (katydid) =

Genus of katydids

Lesina is a genus of bush cricket in the tribe Agraeciini. Species in this genus are known as 'dragon headed katydids'. They are native to tropical Asia including Malaysia, Indonesia and Borneo.

== Species ==
The Orthoptera Species File lists:

subgenus Ellatodon Caudell, 1927

- Lesina blanchardi (Brongniart, 1890)
- Lesina maxima Gorochov & Berezin, 2016

subgenus Lesina Walker, 1869

- Lesina ensifera (Brullé, 1835)
- Lesina intermedia (Karny, 1923)
- Lesina karnyi de Jong, 1942
- Lesina lutescens Walker, 1869 - type species
- Lesina vaginata Karny, 1923

== Misidentification ==
Lesina is often misidentified as Acridoxena, found in Africa.
