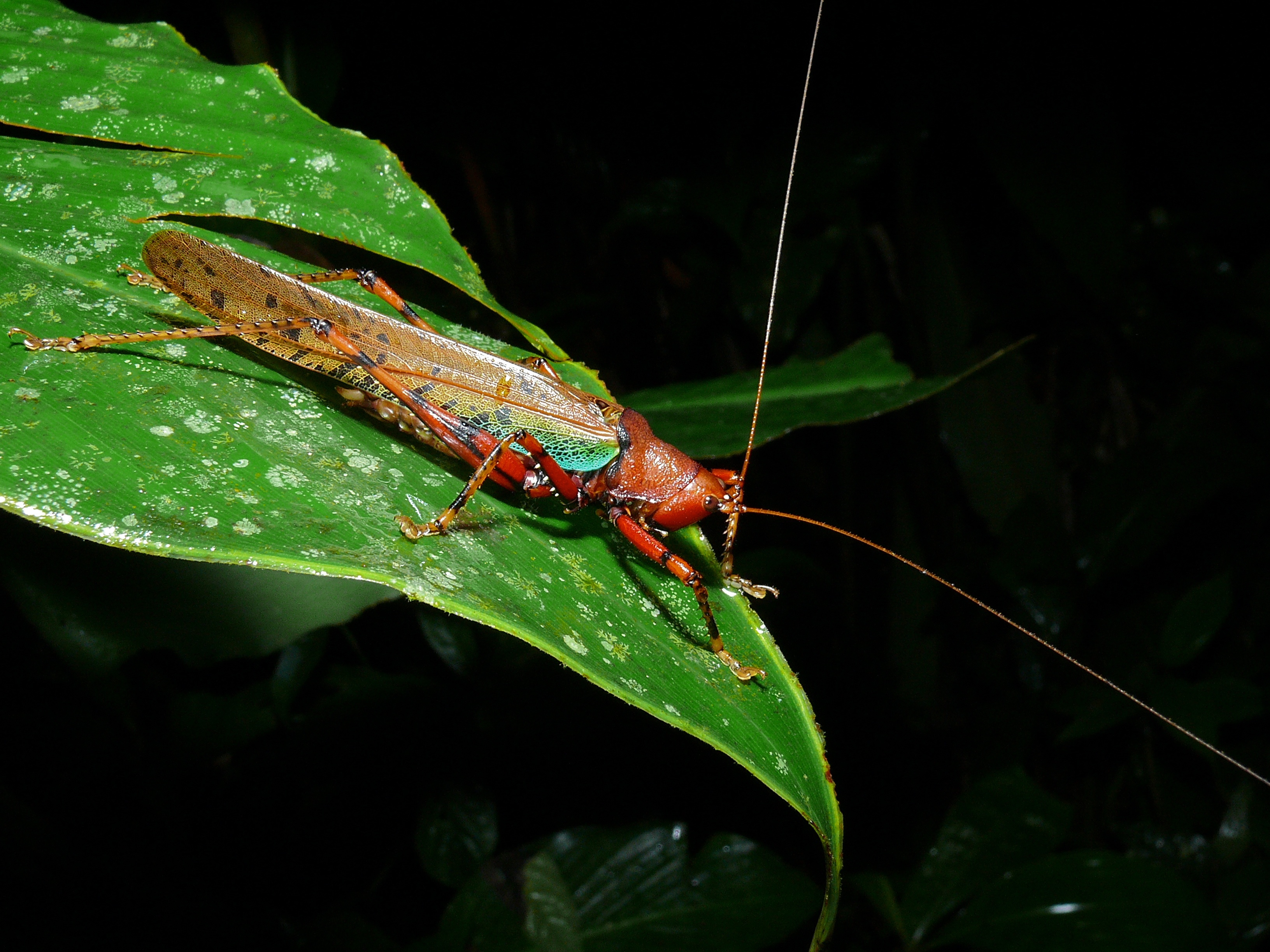
- Eumacroxiphus brachyurus

Scientific classification
- Kingdom: Animalia
- Phylum: Arthropoda
- Class: Insecta
- Order: Orthoptera
- Suborder: Ensifera
- Family: Tettigoniidae
- Subfamily: Conocephalinae
- Tribe: Agraeciini; Redtenbacher, 1891

= Agraeciini =

Tribe of cricket-like animals

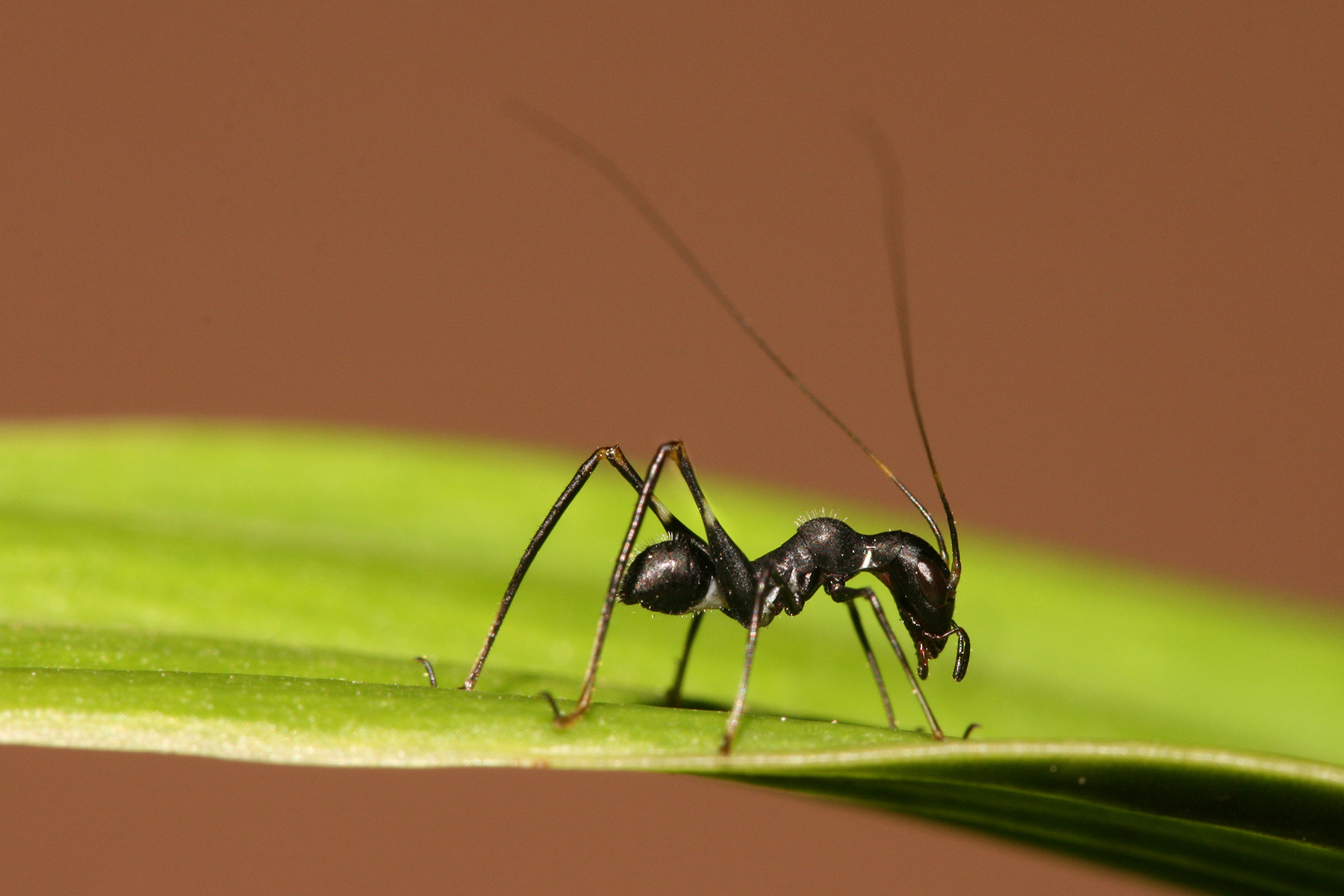
Macroxiphus sp. mimicking an ant

Agraeciini is a large tribe of bush crickets or katydids in the conehead subfamily, Conocephalinae.

== Subtribes and genera ==
The Orthoptera Species File lists:

=== Subtribe Agraeciina ===
Auth: Redtenbacher, 1891 – Central-South America, Papua New Guinea

- Agraecia Serville, 1831
- Iaratrox Chamorro-Rengifo & Lopes-Andrade, 2015
- Starkonsa Chamorro-Rengifo & Lopes-Andrade, 2015
- Yvelinula Chamorro-Rengifo & Lopes-Andrade, 2015

=== Subtribe Eumegalodontina ===
Auth: Brongniart, 1892 – Malesia

- Lesina Walker, 1869 (includes subgenus Ellatodon Caudell, 1927)

=== Subtribe Liarina ===
Auth: S. Ingrisch – India and Indochina to western Australia

- Acrodonta Redtenbacher, 1891
- Amacroxiphus Ingrisch, 1998
- Anelytra Redtenbacher, 1891
- Bispinolakis Ingrisch, 1998
- Eppioides Hebard, 1922
- Eumacroxiphus Ingrisch, 1998
- Gonatacanthus Karny, 1907
- Goodangarkia Rentz, 2009
- Jambiliara Ingrisch, 1998
- Labugama Henry, 1932
- Liara Redtenbacher, 1891
- Liaromorpha Gorochov, 1994
- Lichnofugia Ingrisch, 1998
- Lubuksia Ingrisch, 1998
- Macroxiphus Pictet, 1888
- Odontoconus Fritze, 1908
- Oxystethus Redtenbacher, 1891
- Peracca Griffini, 1897
- Pseudacrodonta Ingrisch, 1998
- Pseudosubria Karny, 1926
- Rhynchocerus Karsch, 1896
- Rhytidogyne Karny, 1907
- Sacculiphallus Ingrisch, 1998
- Scytocera Redtenbacher, 1891
- Scytoceroides Henry, 1932
- Sialaiana Ingrisch, 1998
- Viriacca Ingrisch, 1998

=== Subtribe Oxylakina ===
Auth: Ingrisch, 1998 – India, Indochina, Malesia

- Depressacca Ingrisch, 1998
- Ischnophyllus Redtenbacher, 1891
- Kirkaldyus Griffini, 1908
- Nahlaksia Ingrisch, 1998
- Oxylakis Redtenbacher, 1891
- Paragraecia Karny, 1907
- Paroxylakis Ingrisch, 1998
- Tabangacris Willemse, 1966

=== Subtribe Salomonina ===
Auth: Brongniart, 1897 – Indochina, Philippines, Malesia to Australasia

- Ingrischia Naskrecki & Rentz, 2010
- Paranicsara Ingrisch, 1998
- Salomona Blanchard, 1853
- Trichophallus Ingrisch, 1998

=== Subtribe incertae sedis ===
Genus group Axylus Ingrisch, 2015

1. Anthracites Redtenbacher, 1891
2. Axylus Stål, 1877
3. Eucoptaspis Willemse, 1966
4. Eulobaspis Ingrisch, 2015
5. Heminicsara Karny, 1912

Other genera

1. Aethiomerus Redtenbacher, 1891
2. Afroagraecia Ingrisch & Hemp, 2013
3. Afroanthracites Hemp & Ingrisch, 2013
4. Allomenus Saussure, 1899
5. Anthracopsis Karny, 1907
6. Austrosalomona Rentz, 1988
7. Barbaragraecia Rentz & Su, 2020
8. Centrocephalus Brongniart, 1897
9. Cesacomora Koçak & Kemal, 2009
10. Cooloolagraecia Rentz, Su & Ueshima, 2021
11. Coptaspis Redtenbacher, 1891
12. Coryphodonta Bey-Bienko, 1935
13. Dectinomima Caudell, 1910
14. Dendrobia Hemp & Ingrisch, 2017
15. Dicranacrus Redtenbacher, 1891
16. Emeraldagraecia Rentz, Su & Ueshima, 2012
17. Episattus Brongniart, 1897
18. Eppia Stål, 1875
19. Erechthis Bolívar, 1888
20. Eschatoceras Redtenbacher, 1891
21. Euanthracites Ingrisch, 2015
22. Gallienia Brongniart, 1897
23. Geoffagraecia Rentz & Su, 2020
24. Greenagraecia Rentz & Su, 2020
25. Habetia Kirby, 1906
26. Haudrhytidaspis Ingrisch, 2019
27. Hyperomerus Redtenbacher, 1891
28. Ingrischagraecia Rentz, Su & Ueshima, 2012
29. Kokominiagraecia Rentz, Su & Ueshima, 2021
30. Larifugagraecia Rentz & Su, 2020
31. Liosternus Brongniart, 1897
32. Loja Giglio-Tos, 1898
33. Mesagraecia Ingrisch, 1998
34. Microsalomona Karny, 1912
35. Miniagraecia Rentz, Su & Ueshima, 2012
36. Nannagroecia Redtenbacher, 1891
37. Nanoagraecia Ingrisch, 2020
38. Neacrodonta Gorochov, 2008
39. Nicsara Walker, 1869
40. Oxycalypta Karny, 1914
41. Palaeoagraecia Ingrisch, 1998
42. Pandanagraecia Naskrecki & Rentz, 2010
43. Papuacites Ingrisch, 2015
44. Parahabetia Ingrisch, 2021
45. Paralobaspis Giglio-Tos, 1898
46. Paramacroxiphus Willemse, 1961
47. Paranelytra Karny, 1907
48. Parasubria Karny, 1911
49. Philmontis Willemse, 1966
50. Pseudoliara Karny, 1907
51. Pseudomacroxiphus Willemse, 1961
52. Pseudonicsara Karny, 1912
53. Ragoniella Chamorro-Rengifo & Lopes-Andrade, 2015
54. Redtenbachus Chamorro-Rengifo & Lopes-Andrade, 2015
55. Rhacoptera Karny, 1907
56. Rhytidaspis Redtenbacher, 1891
57. Secsiva Walker, 1869
58. Senexefigia Chamorro-Rengifo & Lopes-Andrade, 2015
59. Sphyrometopa Carl, 1908
60. Subria Stål, 1874
61. Subrioides Willemse, 1966
62. Sulasara Ingrisch, 2015
63. Sylvainhugiella Chamorro-Rengifo & Lopes-Andrade, 2015
64. Tamolana Kuthy, 1910
65. Timbarragraecia Rentz, Su & Ueshima, 2021
66. Warimiri Tavares, de Mello & Mendes, 2021
67. Wuyjugu Tavares, 2020
