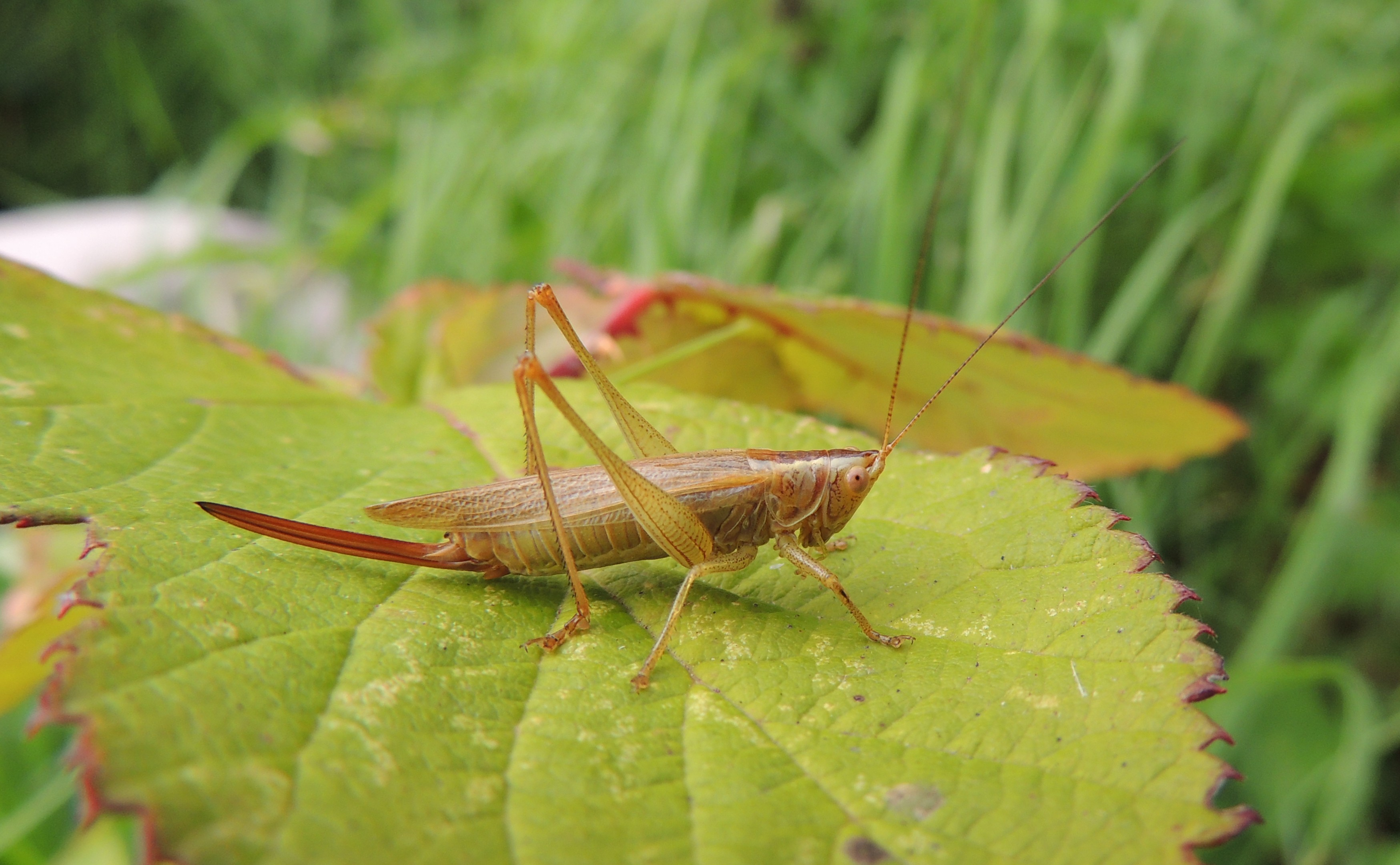
- Female long winged conehead (Conocephalus fuscus), Cople, Bedfordshire.

Scientific classification
- Kingdom: Animalia
- Phylum: Arthropoda
- Class: Insecta
- Order: Orthoptera
- Suborder: Ensifera
- Superfamily: Tettigonioidea
- Family: Tettigoniidae
- Subfamily: Conocephalinae; Kirby & Spence, 1826

Tribes and genera
- See text

Synonyms
- Conocephalidae Kirby & Spence, 1826; Conocephalidi Burmeister, 1838

= Conocephalinae =

Subfamily of cricket-like animals

Conocephalinae, meaning "conical head", is an Orthopteran subfamily in the family Tettigoniidae.

== Genera ==
The Orthoptera Species File lists the following subtribes and genera:

=== Tribe Agraeciini ===
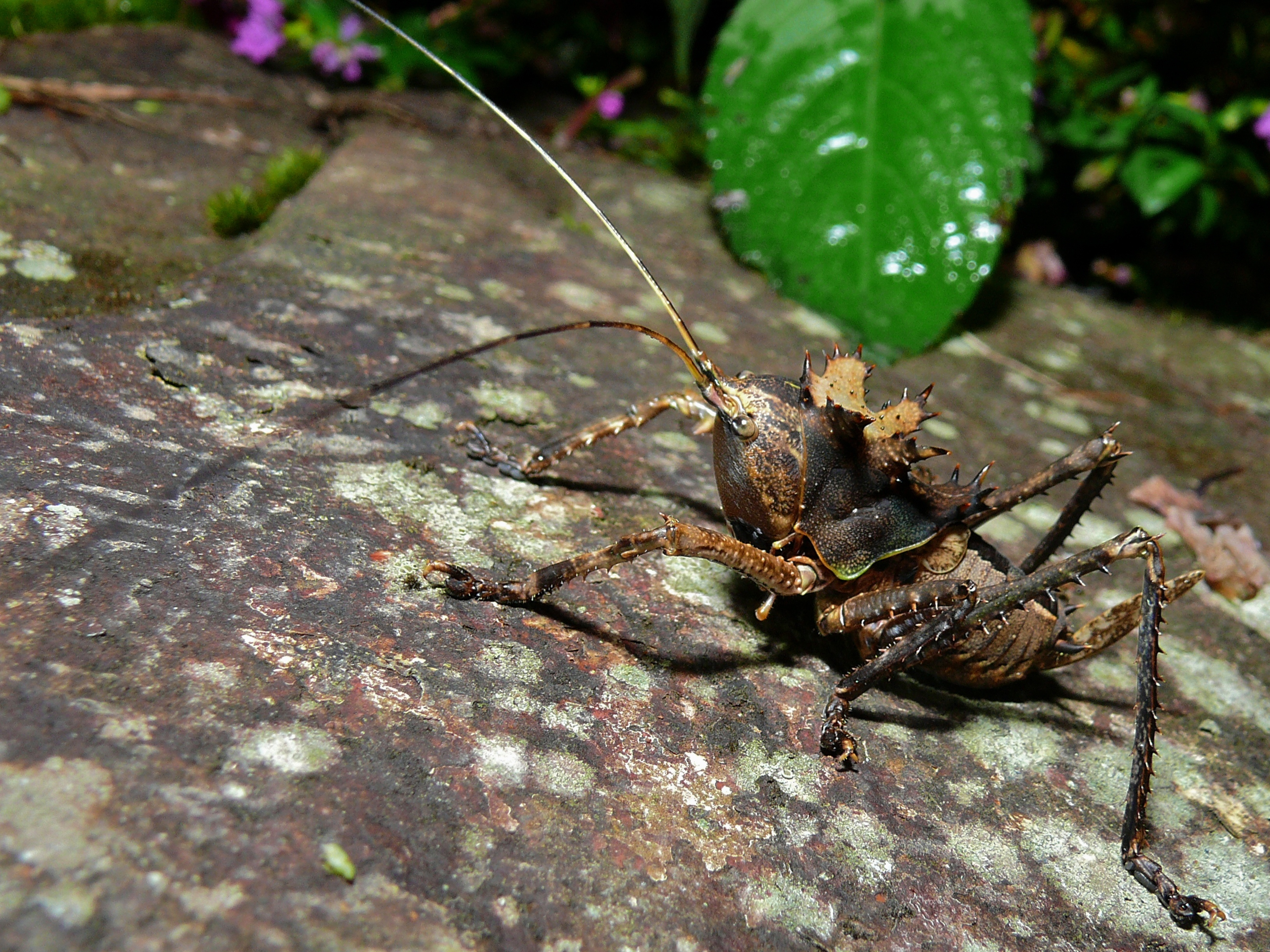
female nymph of Lesina karnyi

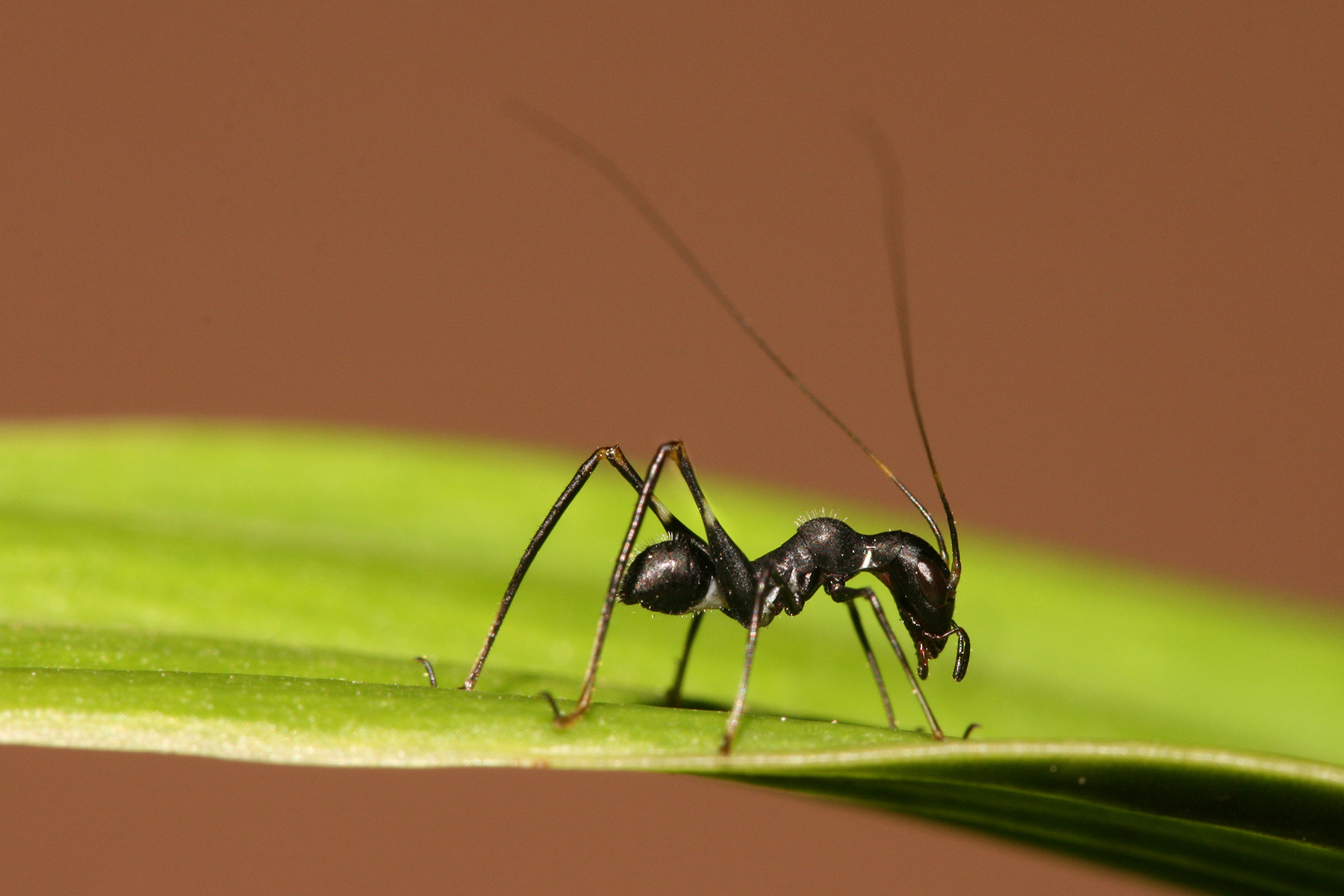
Macroxiphus sp. (ant mimic)

Mostly South America, Africa, South-East Asia and Australia; Auth: Redtenbacher, 1891

- subtribe Agraeciina Redtenbacher, 1891
  - Agraecia Serville, 1831
- subtribe Eumegalodontina Brongniart, 1892
  - Lesina Walker, 1869
- subtribe Liarina Ingrisch, 1998
  - Labugama Henry, 1932
  - Liara Redtenbacher, 1891
  - Macroxiphus Pictet, 1888
- subtribe Oxylakina Ingrisch, 1998
  - Oxylakis Redtenbacher, 1891
- subtribe Salomonina Brongniart, 1897
  - Salomona Blanchard, 1853
- subtribe undetermined (many genera)
  - Coptaspis Redtenbacher, 1891

=== Tribe Armadillagraeciini ===
Australia; Auth: Rentz, Su & Ueshima, 2012

1. Armadillagraecia Rentz, Su, Ueshima & Robinson, 2010
2. Kapalgagraecia Rentz, Su, Ueshima & Robinson, 2010
3. Lichenagraecia Rentz, Su & Ueshima, 2012

=== Tribe Cestrophorini ===
South America; Auth: Gorochov, 2015

1. Acanthacara Scudder, 1869
2. Cestrophorus Redtenbacher, 1891

=== Tribe Coniungopterini ===
Mostly South America and Australia; Auth: Rentz & Gurney, 1985

1. Coniungoptera Rentz & Gurney, 1985
2. Metholce Walker, 1871
3. Veria Walker, 1869

=== Tribe Conocephalini ===
Auth: Burmeister, 1838

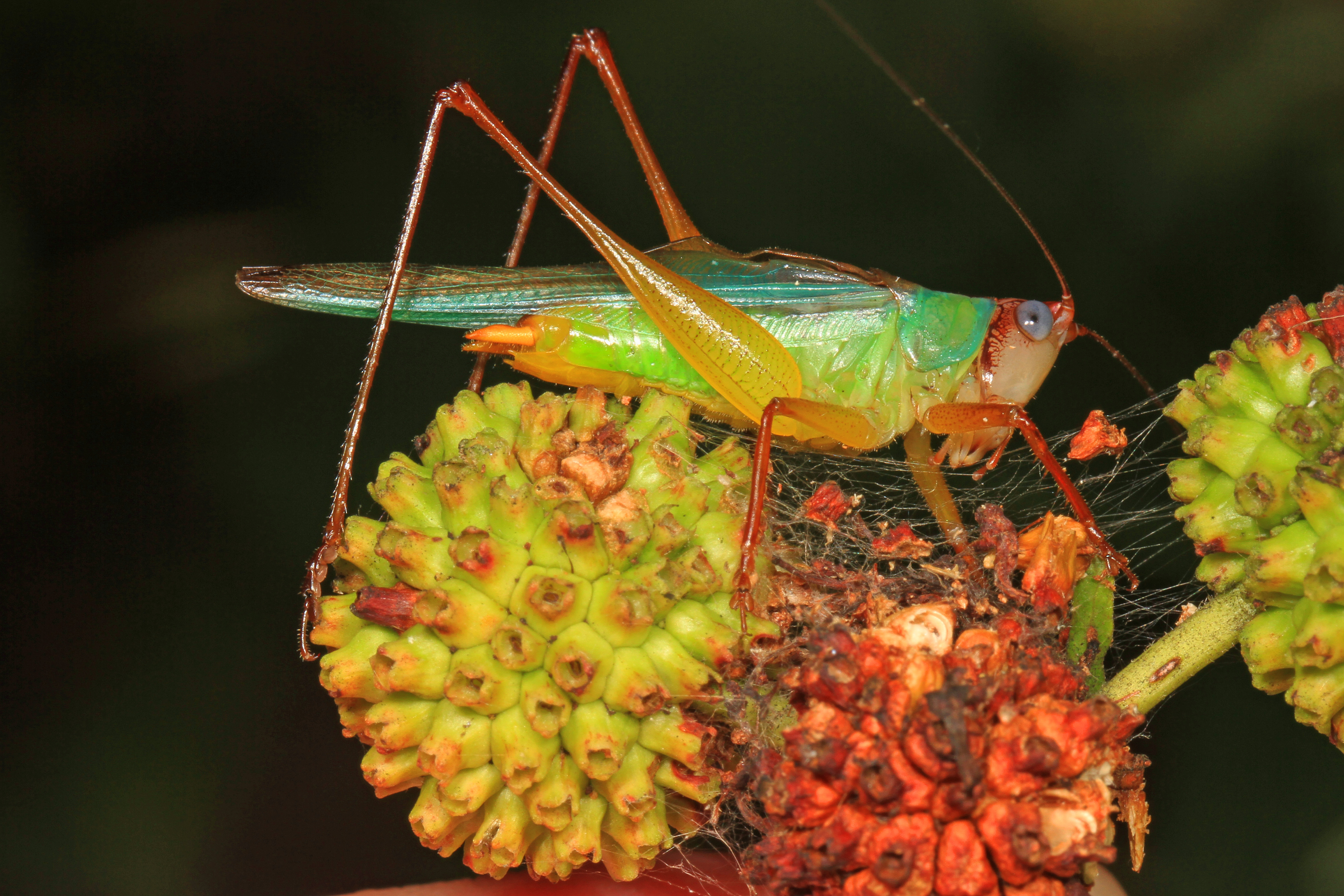
Orchelimum pulchellum

Meadow katydid in Hawaii

subtribe Karniellina Hemp & Heller, 2010 (Africa)

- Acanthoscirtes Hemp, 2012
- Chortoscirtes Hemp, 2010
- Fulvoscirtes Hemp, 2012
- Karniella Rehn, 1914
- Melanoscirtes Hemp, 2010
- Naskreckiella Ünal, 2005
- Phlesirtes Bolívar, 1922

subtribe not placed (global distribution)

- Conanalus Tinkham, 1943
- Conocephalus Thunberg, 1815
  - subgenus Amurocephalus Storozhenko, 2004: A. chinensis (Redtenbacher, 1891)
  - subgenus Anisoptera Latreille, 1829
  - subgenus Aphauropus: A. leptopterus Rehn & Hebard, 1915
  - subgenus Chloroxiphidion Hebard, 1922
  - subgenus Conocephalus Thunberg, 1815
  - subgenus Dicellurina Rehn & Hebard, 1938
  - subgenus Megalotheca Karny, 1907
  - subgenus Opeastylus Rehn & Hebard, 1915
  - subgenus Perissacanthus Rehn & Hebard, 1915
- Elasmometopus Chopard, 1952
- Enoplocephalacris Chopard, 1952
- Euxiphidion Bruner, 1915
- Fatuhivella Hebard, 1935
- Lipotactomimus Naskrecki, 2000
- Luzoniella Karny, 1926
- Nukuhivella Hebard, 1935
- Odontoxiphidium Morse, 1901
- Orchelimum Serville, 1838
- Paulianacris Chopard, 1952
- Thyridorhoptrum Rehn & Hebard, 1915
- Tympanotriba Piza, 1971 - monotypic: T. vittata Piza, 1971
- Xiphelimum Caudell, 1906 - monotypic: X. amplipennis Caudell, 1906

=== Tribe Copiphorini ===
Worldwide; Auth: Karny 1912; selected genera:

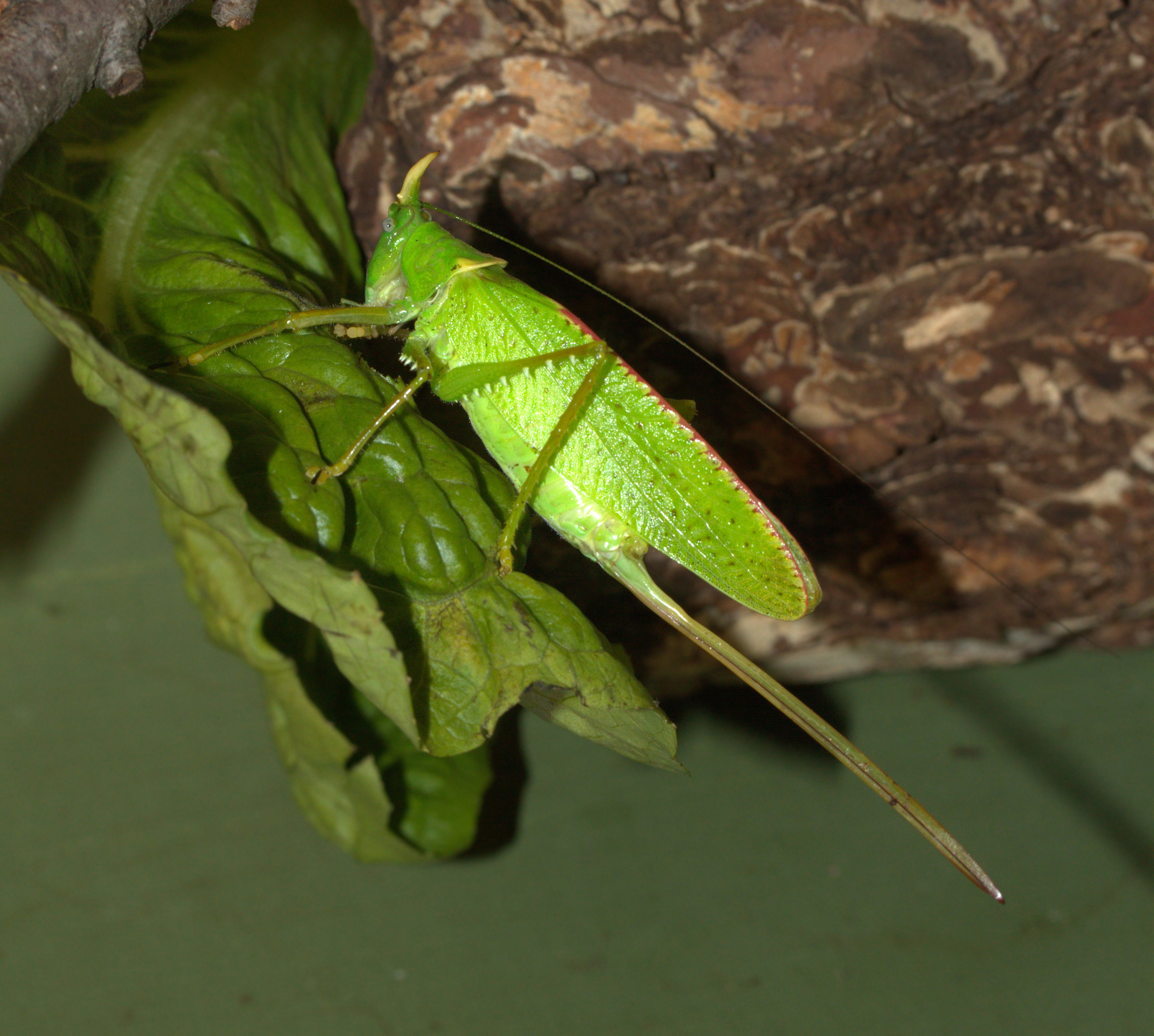
Copiphora rhinoceros female

- Banza Walker, 1870
- Belocephalus Scudder, 1875
- Copiphora Serville, 1831
- Euconocephalus Karny, 1907
- Lanista Bolívar, 1890
- Moncheca Walker, 1869
- Neoconocephalus Karny, 1907
- Panacanthus Walker, 1869
- Pseudorhynchus Serville, 1838
- Pyrgocorypha Stål, 1873
- Ruspolia Schulthess Schindler, 1898
- Xestophrys Redtenbacher, 1891

=== Tribe Euconchophorini ===
Madagascar; Auth: Gorochov, 1988

1. Amblylakis Redtenbacher, 1891
2. Colossopus Saussure, 1899
3. Euconchophora Brongniart, 1897
4. Malagasopus Ünal & Beccaloni, 2017
5. Odontolakis Redtenbacher, 1891
6. Oncodopus Brongniart, 1897

=== Tribe undetermined ===
1. Ebneria Karny, 1920 - China
2. Elasmometopus Chopard, 1952 - Madagascar
3. Graminofolium Nickle, 2007 - Neotropical
4. Nemoricultrix Mello-Leitão, 1940 - Neotropical
5. Paulianacris Chopard, 1952 - Madagascar
