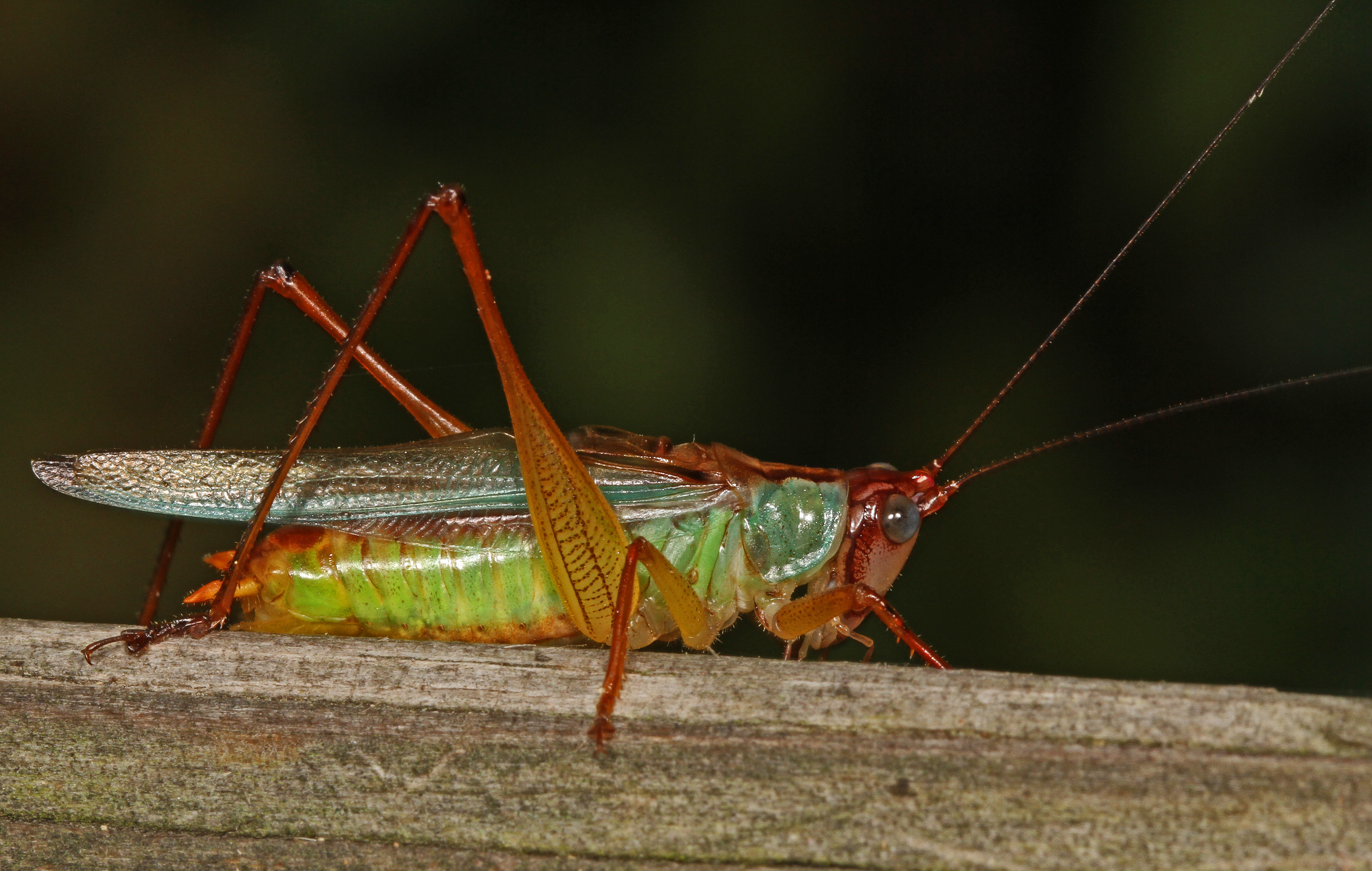

Scientific classification
- Kingdom: Animalia
- Phylum: Arthropoda
- Class: Insecta
- Order: Orthoptera
- Suborder: Ensifera
- Family: Tettigoniidae
- Tribe: Conocephalini
- Genus: Orchelimum
- Species: O. pulchellum

Binomial name
- Orchelimum pulchellum Davis, 1909

= Orchelimum pulchellum =

Species of cricket-like animal

Orchelimum pulchellum, the handsome meadow katydid, is a species of meadow katydid in the family Tettigoniidae. It is found in North America.

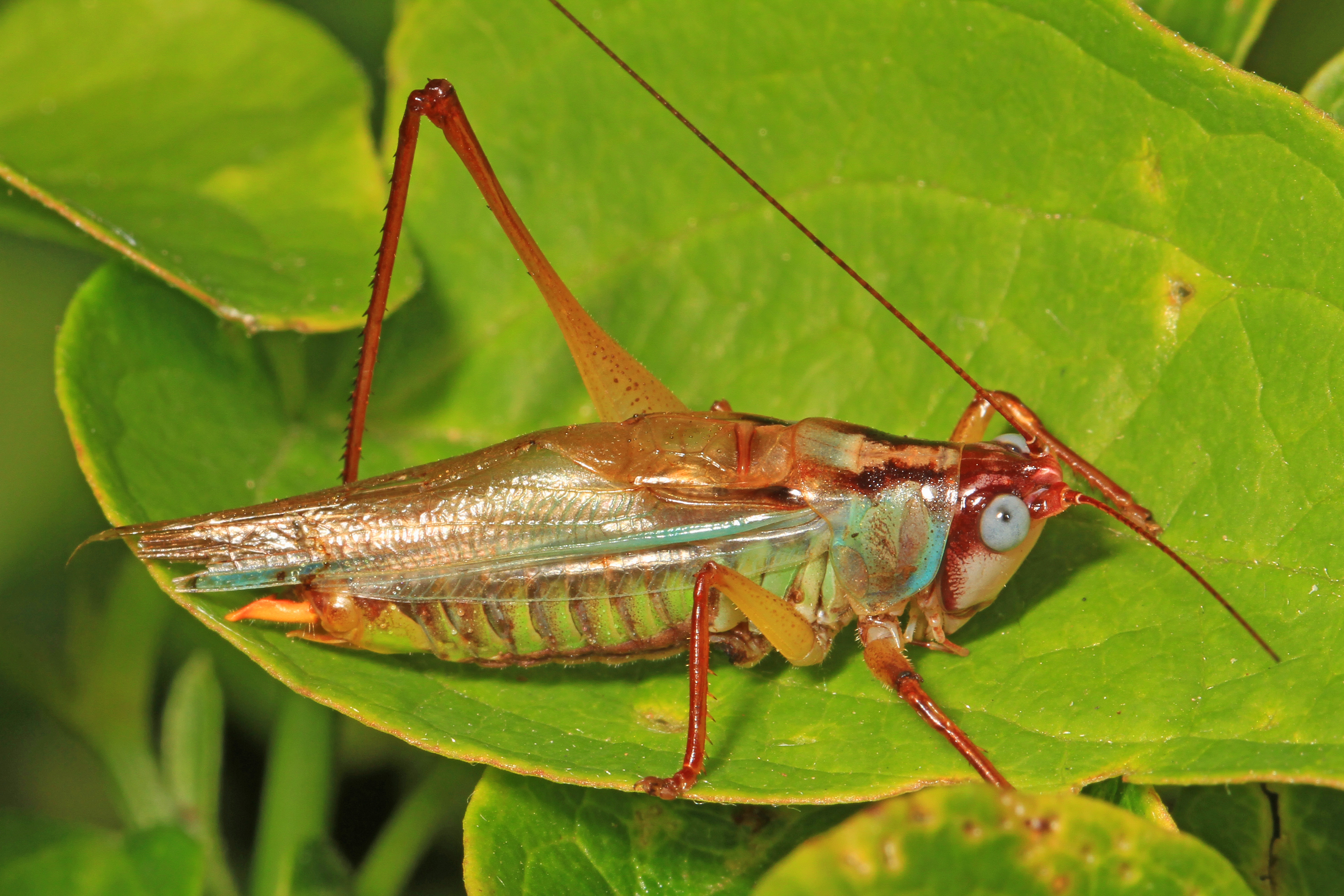
Handsome meadow katydid, Orchelimum pulchellum

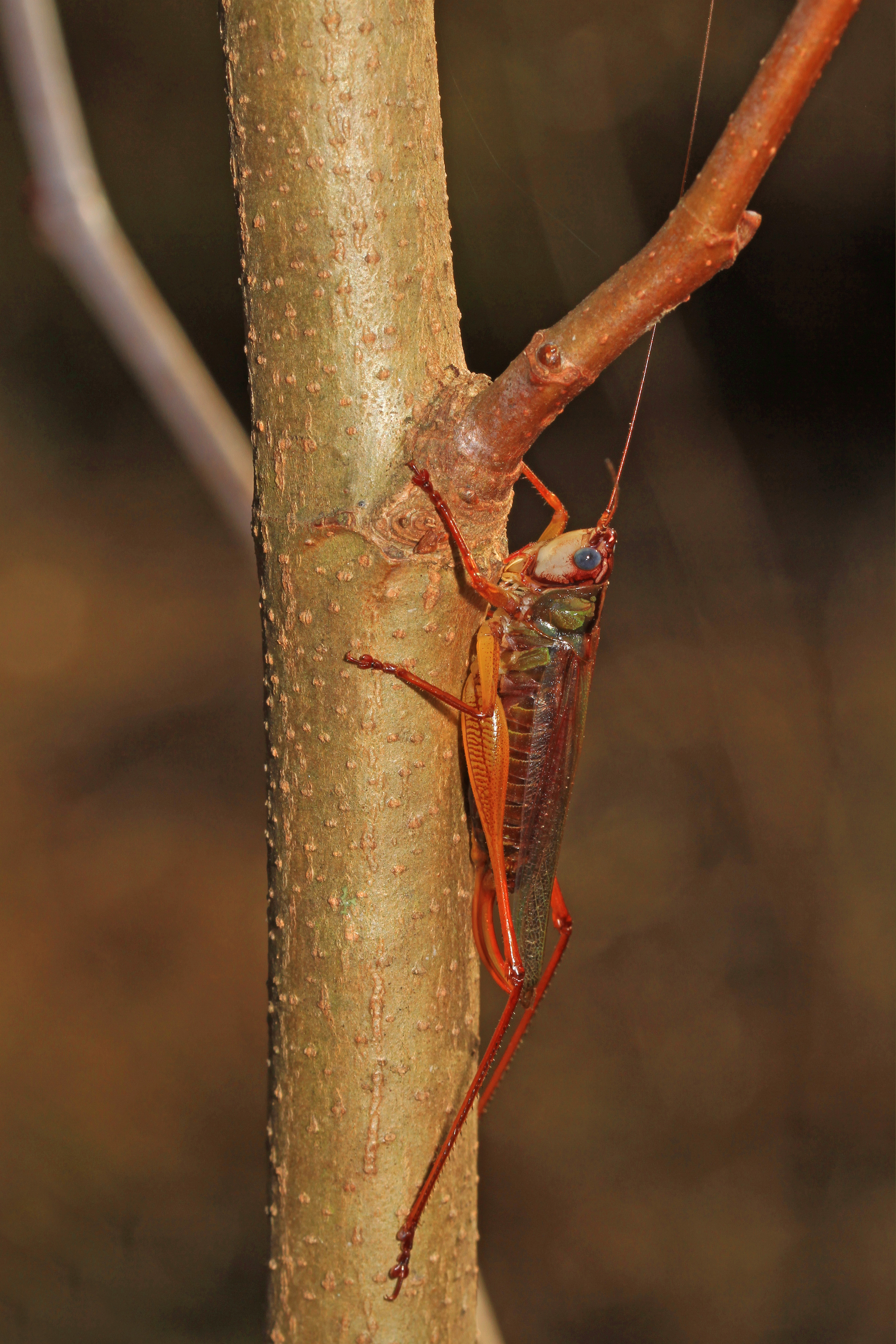
Handsome meadow katydid, Orchelimum pulchellum

== Description ==
The body length of the handsome meadow katydid is 18 to 23 millimetres (0.71 to 0.91 in). This katydid is distinguished from Orchelimum nigripes, its western relative, by the shape of the caudal portion of its lateral pronotum, which is arcuate inferior to the humeral sinus in O. pulchellum, while the same portion is sinuate or sub-sinuate in O. nigripes. The medial tooth on each of the paired male cerci in O. pulchellum is positioned at a less acute angle to the sinuate sinus (Note: The presence of sinuate sinuses on the dorsal portion of male cerci among the Orchelimum is a defining characteristic of the nigripes group: O. pulchellum, O. nigripes, O. bullatum and O. carinatum) of the cercus compared to that of O. nigripes. In females, the ovipositor is long and sickle shaped. The tibiae are brown in O. pulchellum, while they are typically black in O. nigripes. O. pulchellum typically has no spines on the inner carinae of the hind femora, which distinguishes it from another relative, O. carinatum. It is distinguished from its Texas relative, O. bullatum, by virtue of its narrower fastigium and by having spines on the outer ventral carinae of the hind femora, generally numbering at least six total when both legs are counted. O. pulchellum commonly has blue compound eyes, a trait it shares with O. erythrocephalum, on its white or yellow face. At rest, its folded wings appear to have a turquoise stripe, while the body is green with reddish marks around the head.

The song of the handsome meadow katydid is very similar to that of Orchelimum nigripes. It consists of a series of paired and occasional single clicks leading into a short buzz.

== Distribution ==
The handsome meadow katydid is found east of the Appalachian Mountains, as far north as New York state. Its range extends south to Florida and west to Mississippi.

== Ecology ==
This katydid is found in moist forests and in wetlands. It consumes pollen from flowering plants and foliage. In Alabama, it is active from mid-July until mid-November.

== Evolution ==
According to Shapiro (1998), zones of hybridization have been established by O. pulchellum and O. nigripes in Mississippi and Alabama and along the Potomac River, near the confluence of the Anacostia River with the Potomac below the fall line.
