= Orchelimum campestre =

Scientific classification
- Kingdom: Animalia
- Phylum: Arthropoda
- Clade: Pancrustacea
- Class: Insecta
- Order: Orthoptera
- Suborder: Ensifera
- Family: Tettigoniidae
- Tribe: Conocephalini
- Genus: Orchelimum
- Species: O. campestre

Binomial name
- Orchelimum campestre Blatchley, 1893

Species of cricket-like animal

Orchelimum campestre, the dusky-faced meadow katydid, is a species of meadow katydid in the family Tettigoniidae. It is found in North America.
