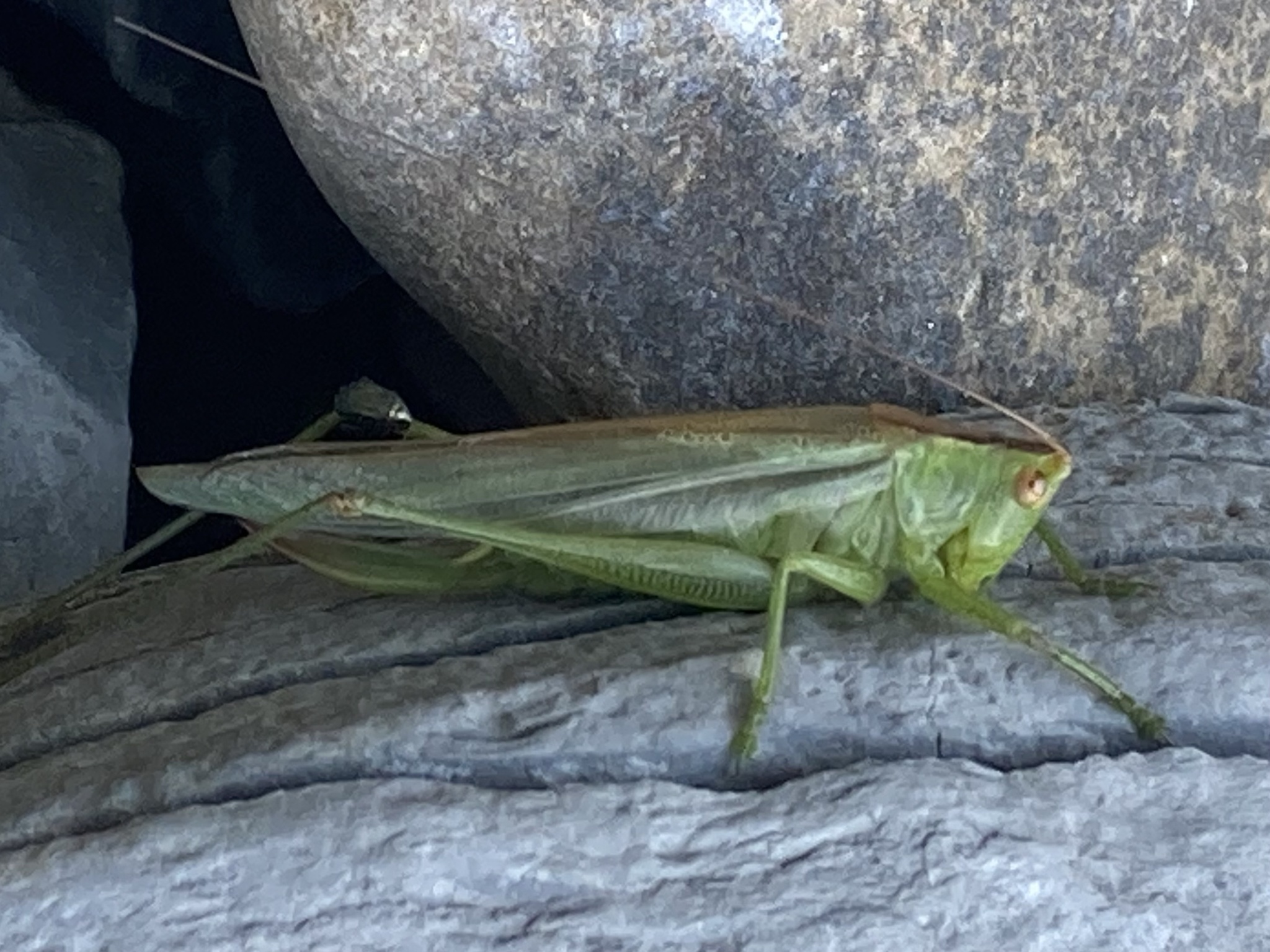

Scientific classification
- Domain: Eukaryota
- Kingdom: Animalia
- Phylum: Arthropoda
- Class: Insecta
- Order: Orthoptera
- Suborder: Ensifera
- Family: Tettigoniidae
- Genus: Orchelimum
- Species: O. gladiator

Binomial name
- Orchelimum gladiator Bruner, 1891

= Orchelimum gladiator =

Species of cricket-like animal

Orchelimum gladiator is a species of katydid that has the common names gladiator meadow katydid and gladiator katydid.

== Description ==
The male is 17 millimeters long and the female is larger, being 18 to 20 millimeters long. The species is pale green with dark brown on its occiput and pronotum. The amount of brown varies per each individual specimen, on both its side and legs. It has reddish eyes. Underneath the prothorax are multiple long spines. Its ovipositor is curved and is close to the length of the abdomen. The ovipositor is also longer than usual among katydids. The wings are slender, with its hind legs at rest and projecting beyond the tips of the fore legs. Its cerci are yellow and stout.

== Habitat ==
Its habitat is in areas with long grass, usually that are close to water, such as prairies and meadows. It is commonly found within the northern United States. It is also present in a moderate population among southeast Asia.

== Ecology ==
Horsehair worms are known to use the gladiator meadow katydid as a host in a parasitic relationship, with the species being one of many katydid hosts.
