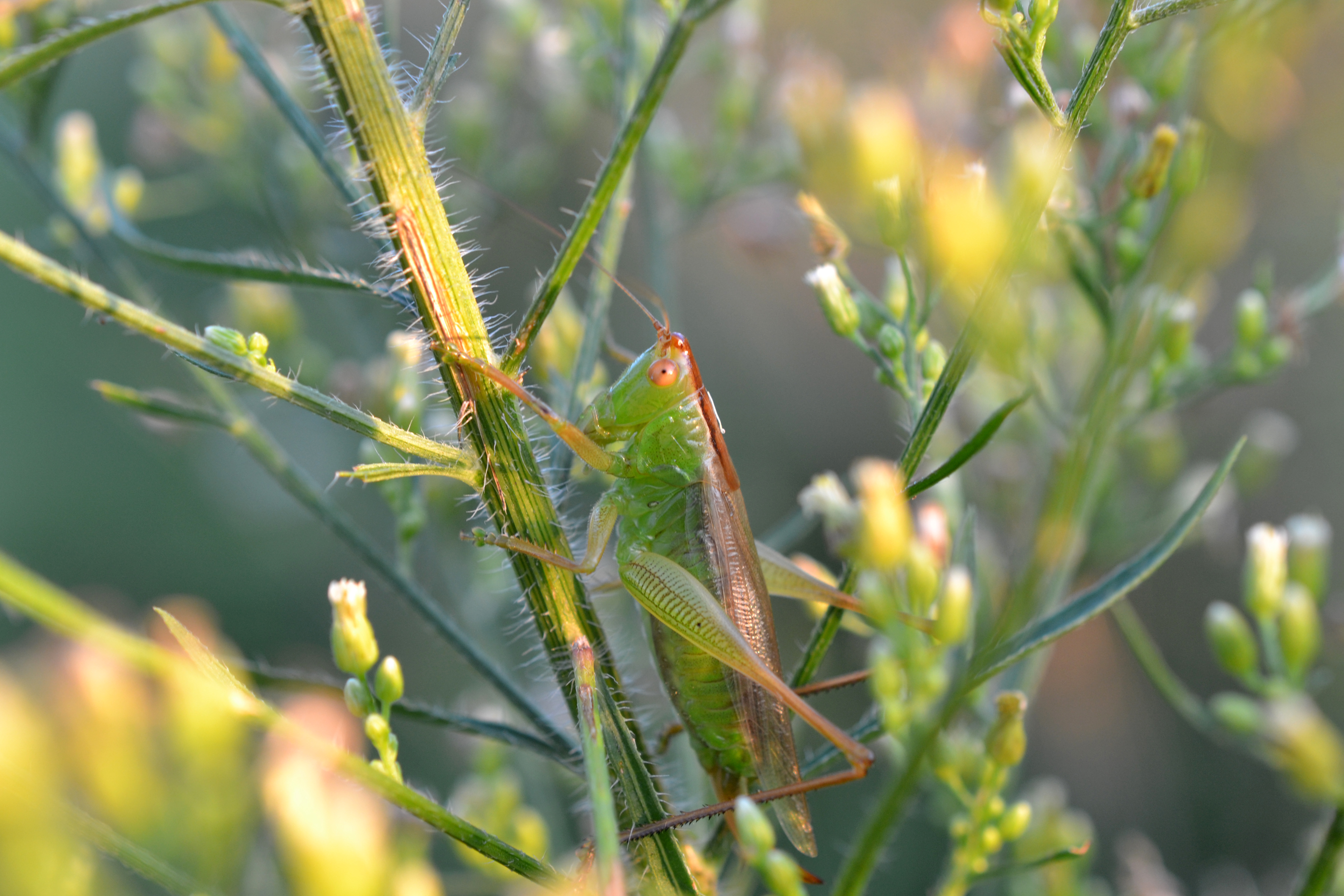

Scientific classification
- Domain: Eukaryota
- Kingdom: Animalia
- Phylum: Arthropoda
- Class: Insecta
- Order: Orthoptera
- Suborder: Ensifera
- Family: Tettigoniidae
- Genus: Orchelimum
- Species: O. vulgare

Binomial name
- Orchelimum vulgare (Harris, 1841)

Synonyms
- Orchelimum cuticulare Serville, 1838; Xiphidium vulgare Harris, 1841; Xiphidium glaberrimum Burmeister, 1838

= Orchelimum vulgare =

Species of cricket-like animal

Orchelimum vulgare, otherwise known as the common meadow katydid, is a species of Orthoptera found in the central and eastern regions of North America. They are active from midsummer to fall.

== Distribution and habitat ==
Orchelimum vulgare is distributed across much of North America. They prefer fields and low meadows, where they perch on clumps of grass. They adapt best in moderate temperature climates, and cannot handle extreme heat or humidity.

== Identification ==
Orchelimum vulgare can be characterized by their red eyes, green faces, and a distinctly curved ovipositor. They have green bodies and brown legs that allow for them to camouflage themselves with their environment. Two black lines can be found on their dorsal shield. The size ranges from 22–40 millimetres (0.87–1.57 in) with the females being larger than the males.

== Diet ==
This species is known to consume a variety of plant species. It has even been recorded eating other Orthoptera.

== Ecology ==
Orchelimum vulgare, like most katydids, functions as a food source for other organisms.
