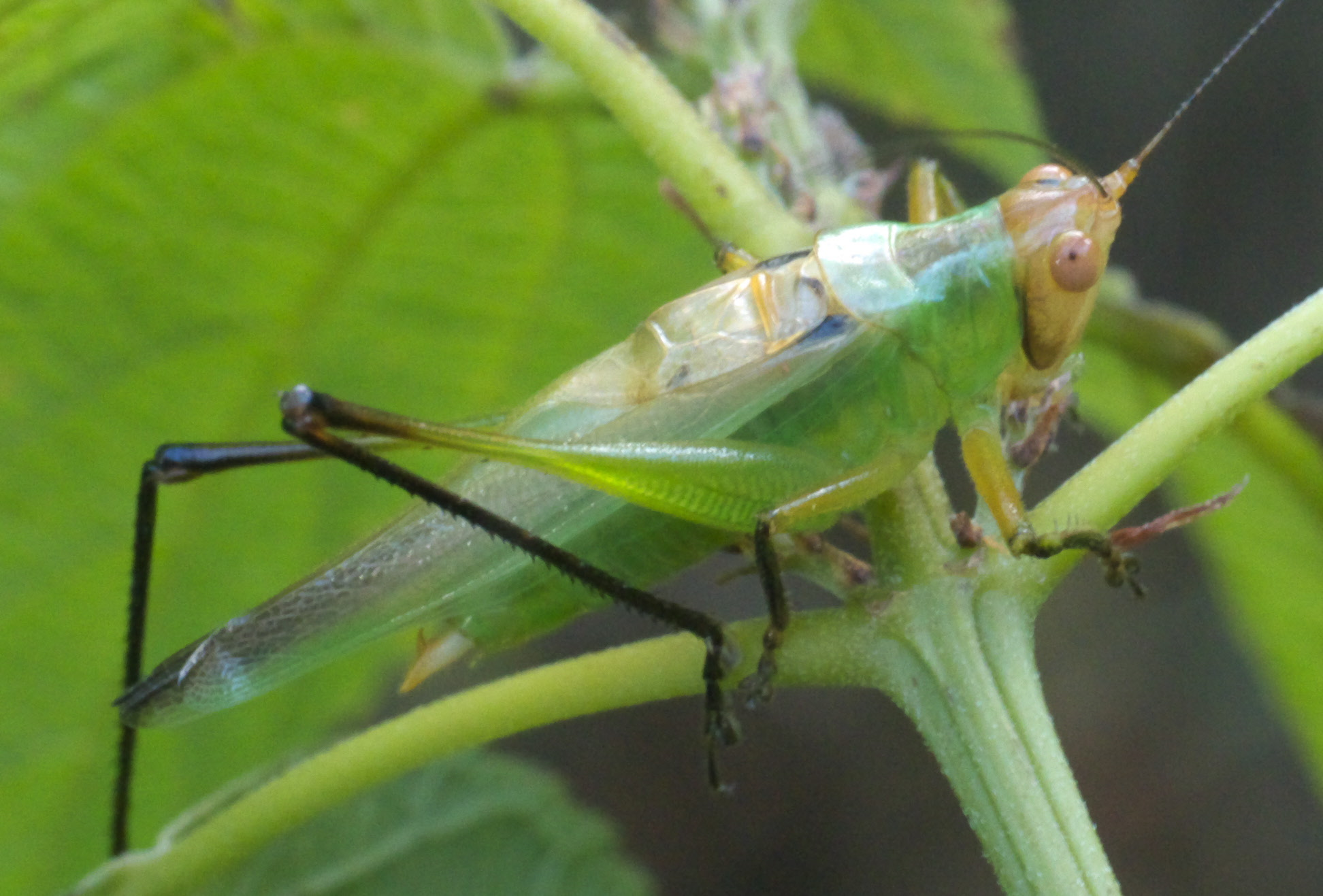

Scientific classification
- Domain: Eukaryota
- Kingdom: Animalia
- Phylum: Arthropoda
- Class: Insecta
- Order: Orthoptera
- Suborder: Ensifera
- Family: Tettigoniidae
- Tribe: Conocephalini
- Genus: Orchelimum
- Species: O. nigripes

Binomial name
- Orchelimum nigripes Scudder, 1875

= Orchelimum nigripes =

Species of cricket-like animal

Orchelimum nigripes, known generally as the black-legged meadow katydid or red-legged meadow grasshopper, is a species of meadow katydid in the family Tettigoniidae. It is found in North America.

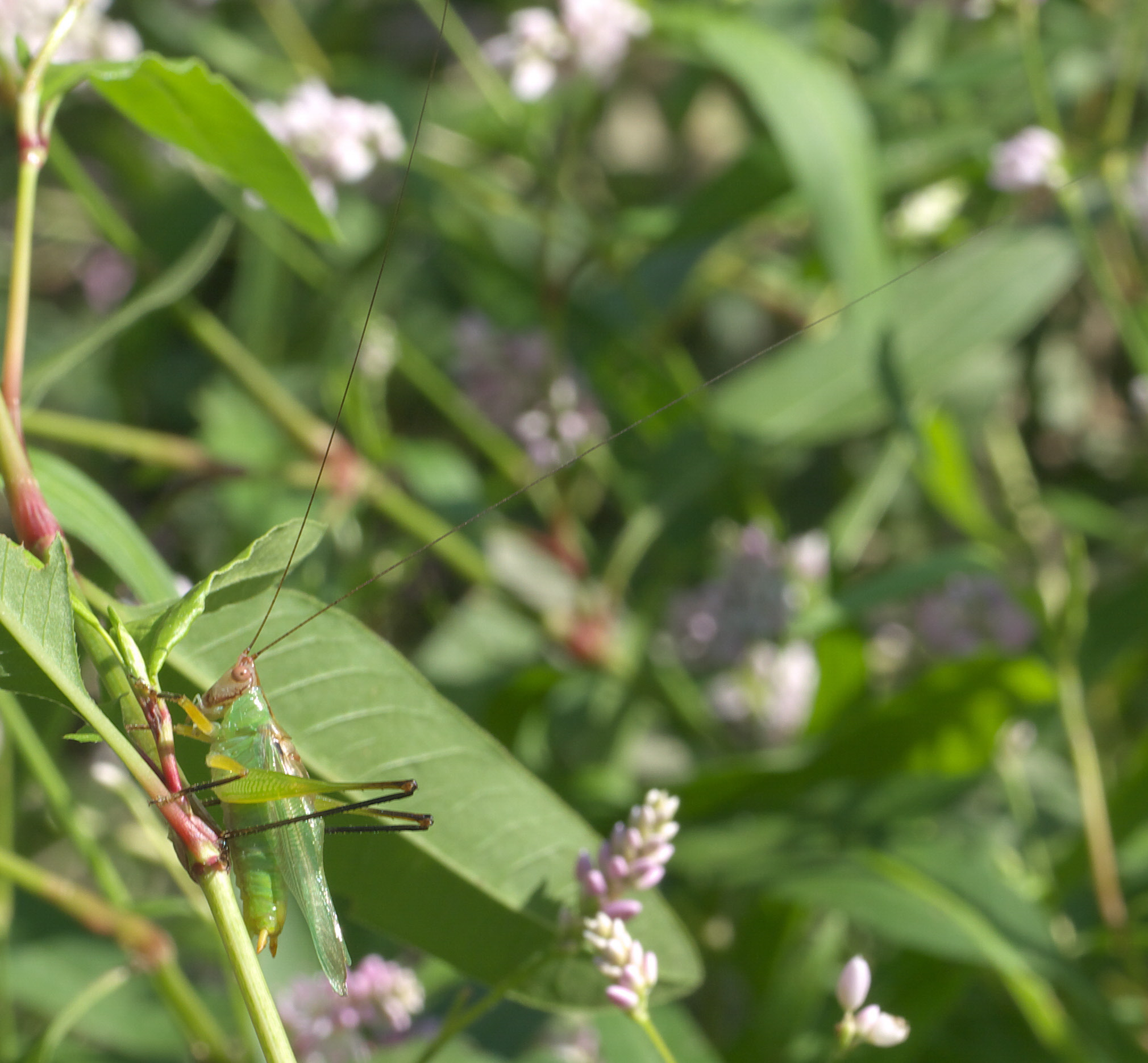
Black-legged meadow katydid, Orchelimum nigripes

Male stridulating

== See also ==
- Orchelimum pulchellum – a similar species with which O. nigripes hybridizes in the southeastern part of its range and along a portion of the Potomac River, the latter case possibly the product of an introduced population of O. nigripes
