= Orchelimum fidicinium =

Scientific classification
- Domain: Eukaryota
- Kingdom: Animalia
- Phylum: Arthropoda
- Class: Insecta
- Order: Orthoptera
- Suborder: Ensifera
- Family: Tettigoniidae
- Genus: Orchelimum
- Species: O. fidicinium

Binomial name
- Orchelimum fidicinium Rehn & Hebard, 1907

Species of cricket-like animal

Orchelimum fidicinium, the seaside meadow katydid, is a species of meadow katydid in the family Tettigoniidae. It is found in the Eastern time zone of North America.
