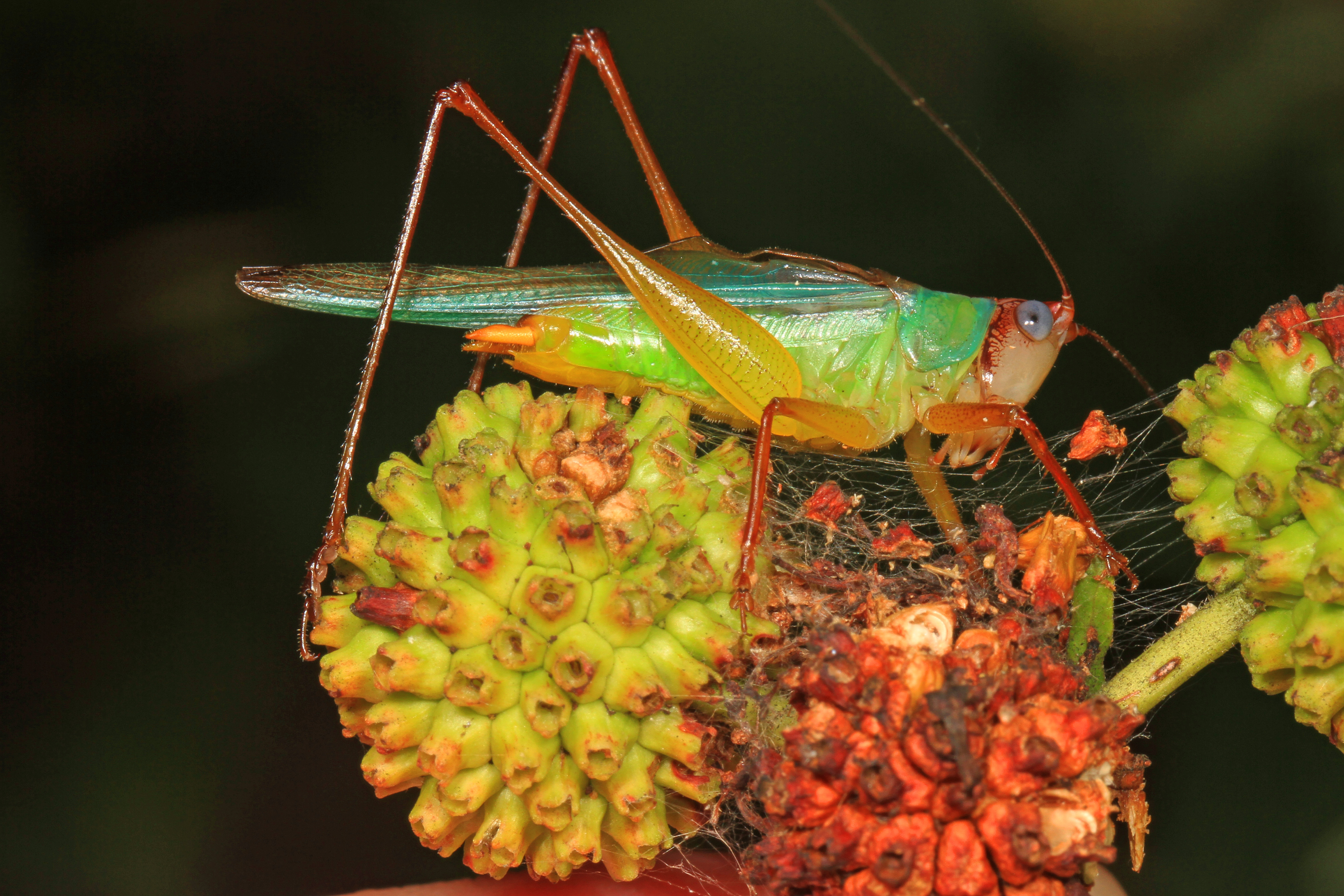
- Orhelimum pulchellum

Scientific classification
- Kingdom: Animalia
- Phylum: Arthropoda
- Clade: Pancrustacea
- Class: Insecta
- Order: Orthoptera
- Suborder: Ensifera
- Family: Tettigoniidae
- Subfamily: Conocephalinae
- Tribe: Conocephalini
- Genus: Orchelimum; Serville, 1838

= Orchelimum =

Genus of insects

Orchelimum is a genus of katydid with 21 known species. They are known as greater meadow katydids due to them being larger than the related genus Conocephalus ("lesser meadow katydids").

== Species ==
The following species are recognised in the genus Orchelimum:

- Subgenus Metarhoptrum Rehn & Hebard, 1915
  - Orchelimum fraternum Rehn & Hebard, 1915
  - Orchelimum superbum Rehn & Hebard, 1915
  - Orchelimum unispina (Saussure & Pictet, 1898)
- Subgenus Orchelimum Serville, 1838
  - Orchelimum agile (De Geer, 1773)
  - Orchelimum bullatum Rehn & Hebard, 1915
  - Orchelimum campestre Blatchley, 1893
  - Orchelimum carinatum Walker, 1971
  - Orchelimum concinnum Scudder, 1862
  - Orchelimum delicatum Bruner, 1892
  - Orchelimum erythrocephalum Davis, 1905
  - Orchelimum fidicinium Rehn & Hebard, 1907
  - Orchelimum gladiator Bruner, 1891
  - Orchelimum laticauda (Redtenbacher, 1891)
  - Orchelimum militare Rehn & Hebard, 1907
  - Orchelimum minor Bruner, 1891
  - Orchelimum nigripes Scudder, 1875
  - Orchelimum pulchellum Davis, 1909
  - Orchelimum silvaticum McNeill, 1891
  - Orchelimum vulgare Harris, 1841
- Subgenus Stenorhoptrum Rehn & Hebard, 1915
  - Orchelimum bradleyi Rehn & Hebard, 1915
  - Orchelimum volantum McNeill, 1891
- [Unplaced subgenus]
  - Orchelimum kasumigauraense Inoue, 2000

See also extinct:

- †Orchelimum placidum Scudder, 1890
