= Orchelimum agile =

Scientific classification
- Domain: Eukaryota
- Kingdom: Animalia
- Phylum: Arthropoda
- Class: Insecta
- Order: Orthoptera
- Suborder: Ensifera
- Family: Tettigoniidae
- Tribe: Conocephalini
- Genus: Orchelimum
- Species: O. agile

Binomial name
- Orchelimum agile (De Geer, 1773)

Species of cricket-like animal

Orchelimum agile, the agile meadow katydid, is a species of meadow katydid in the family Tettigoniidae. It is found in North America.
