= Orchelimum kasumigauraense =

Scientific classification
- Kingdom: Animalia
- Phylum: Arthropoda
- Class: Insecta
- Order: Orthoptera
- Suborder: Ensifera
- Family: Tettigoniidae
- Genus: Orchelimum
- Species: O. kasumigauraense

Binomial name
- Orchelimum kasumigauraense Inoue, 2000

Species of cricket-like animal

Orchelimum kasumigauraense is a species of katydid in the family Tettigoniidae. It is found in Japan.

== Description ==
The species was described by Inoue, 2000.
