= Orchelimum concinnum =

Scientific classification
- Domain: Eukaryota
- Kingdom: Animalia
- Phylum: Arthropoda
- Class: Insecta
- Order: Orthoptera
- Suborder: Ensifera
- Family: Tettigoniidae
- Tribe: Conocephalini
- Genus: Orchelimum
- Species: O. concinnum

Binomial name
- Orchelimum concinnum Scudder, 1863

Species of cricket-like animal

Orchelimum concinnum, known generally as stripe-faced meadow katydid, is a species of meadow katydid in the family Tettigoniidae. Other common names include the red-faced meadow katydid and dusky-faced meadow katydid. It is found in North America and the Caribbean.
