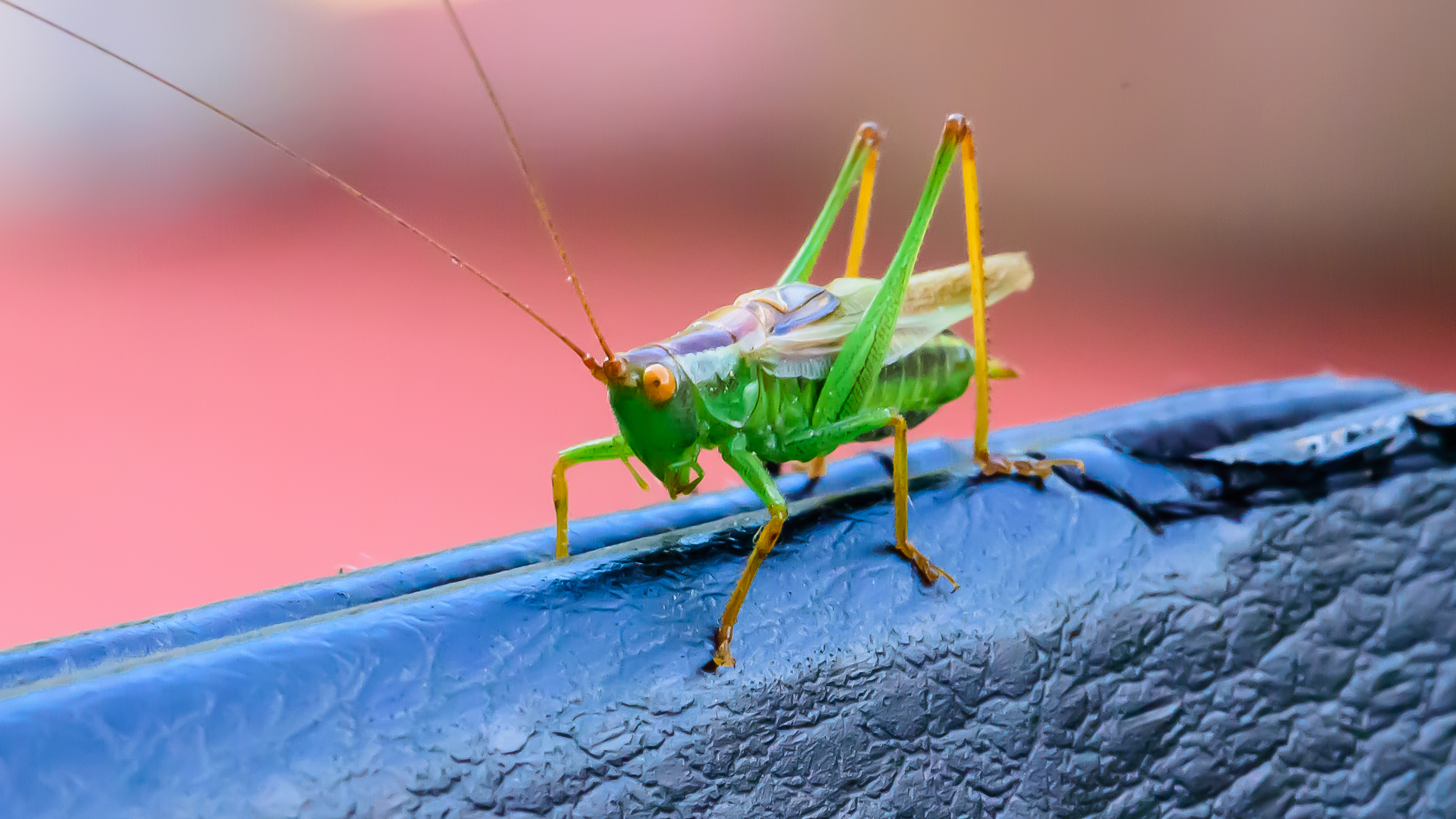

Scientific classification
- Domain: Eukaryota
- Kingdom: Animalia
- Phylum: Arthropoda
- Class: Insecta
- Order: Orthoptera
- Suborder: Ensifera
- Family: Tettigoniidae
- Genus: Orchelimum
- Species: O. minor

Binomial name
- Orchelimum minor Bruner, 1891

= Orchelimum minor =

Species of cricket-like animal

Orchelimum minor, known generally as the lesser pine katydid or lesser pine meadow katydid, is a species of meadow katydid in the family Tettigoniidae. It is found in North America.
