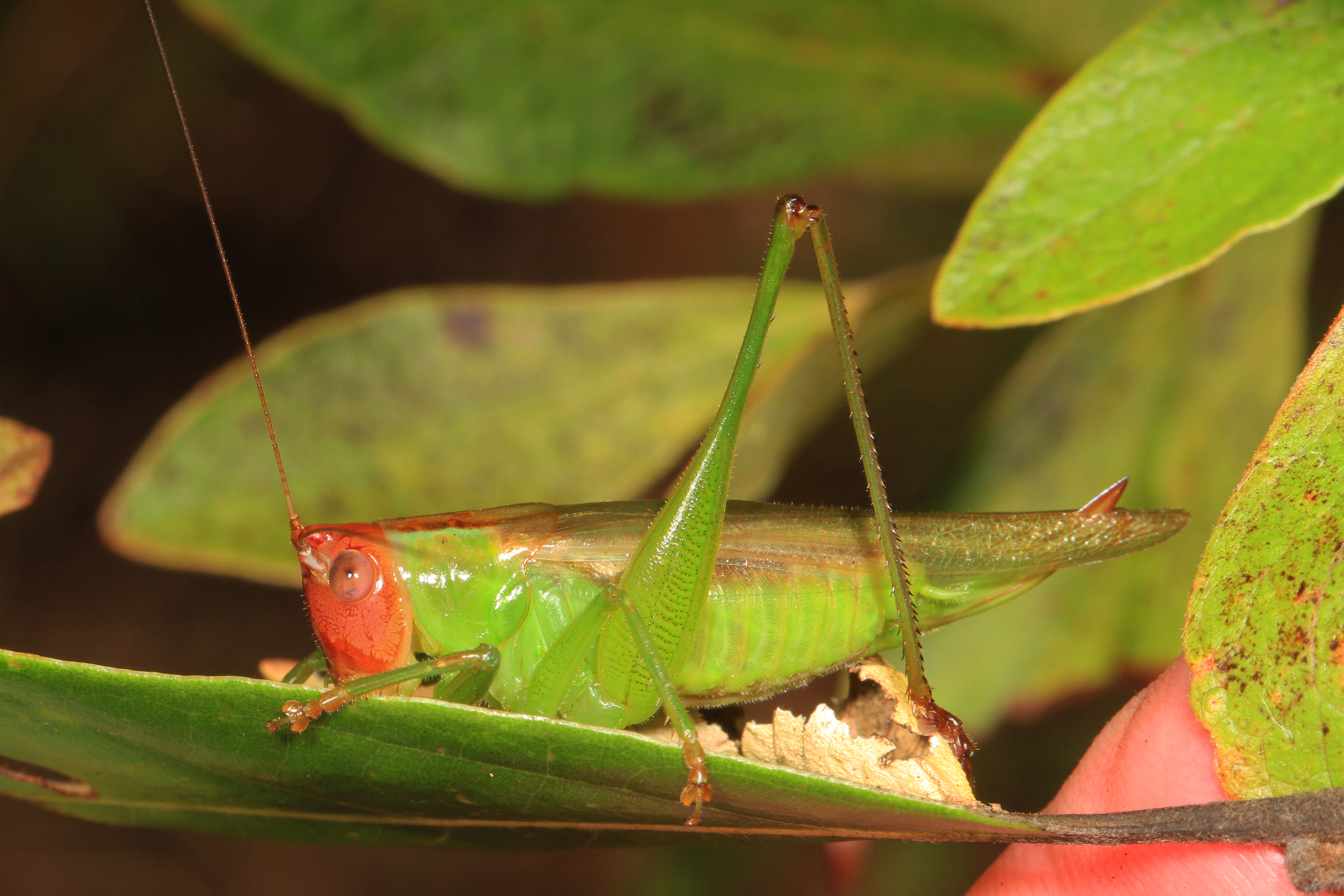

Scientific classification
- Domain: Eukaryota
- Kingdom: Animalia
- Phylum: Arthropoda
- Class: Insecta
- Order: Orthoptera
- Suborder: Ensifera
- Family: Tettigoniidae
- Genus: Orchelimum
- Species: O. erythrocephalum

Binomial name
- Orchelimum erythrocephalum Davis, 1905

= Orchelimum erythrocephalum =

Species of cricket-like animal

Orchelimum erythrocephalum is a species of katydid known as the red-headed meadow katydid. It was described by William T. Davis in 1905.
