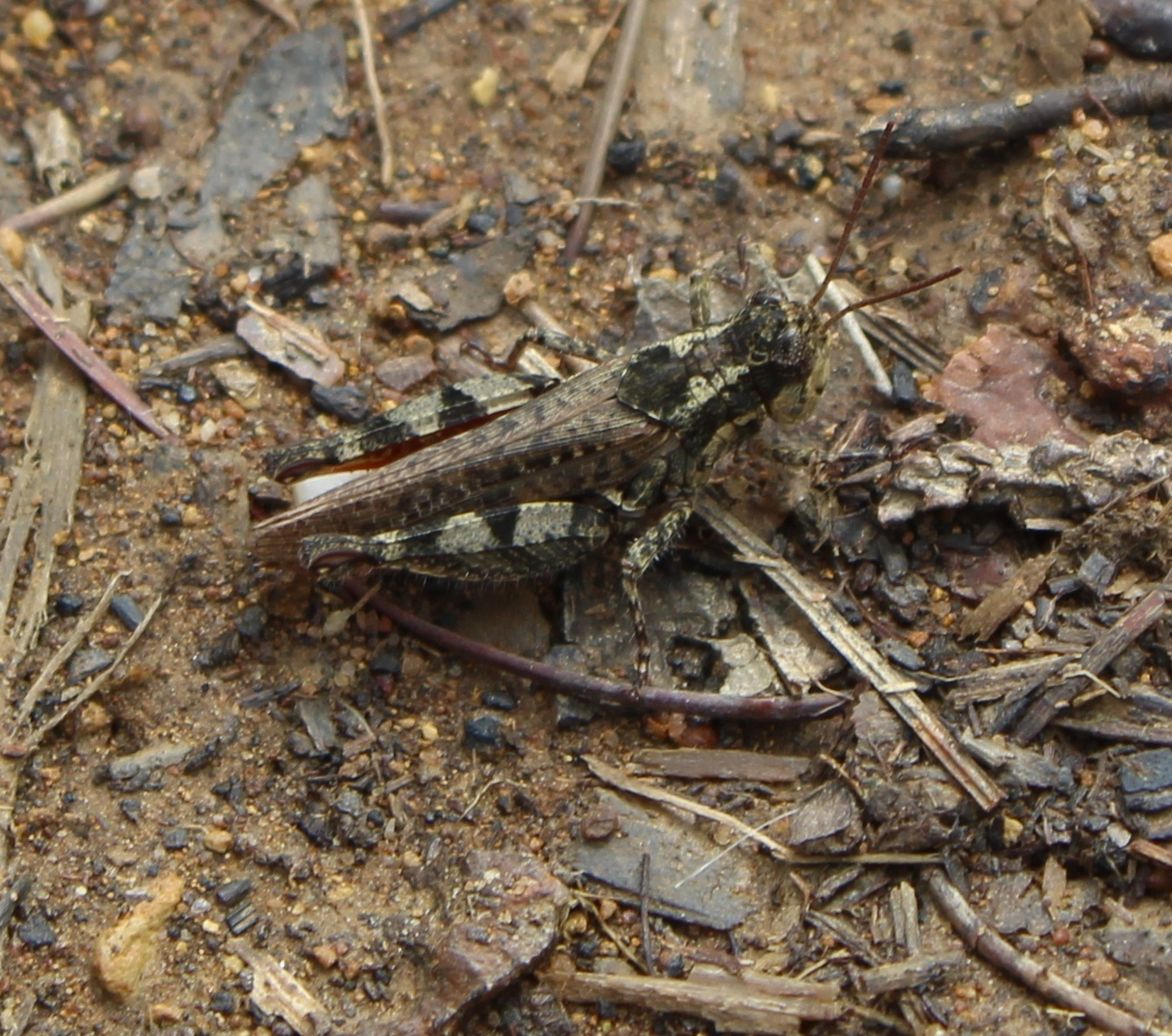
- Baeacris bogotensis, Colombia

Scientific classification
- Domain: Eukaryota
- Kingdom: Animalia
- Phylum: Arthropoda
- Class: Insecta
- Order: Orthoptera
- Suborder: Caelifera
- Family: Acrididae
- Subfamily: Melanoplinae
- Tribe: Dichroplini
- Genus: Baeacris; Rowell & Carbonell, 1977

= Baeacris =

Genus of insects

Baeacris is a genus of spur-throated grasshoppers in the family Acrididae. There are about nine described species in Baeacris, found in Central and South America.

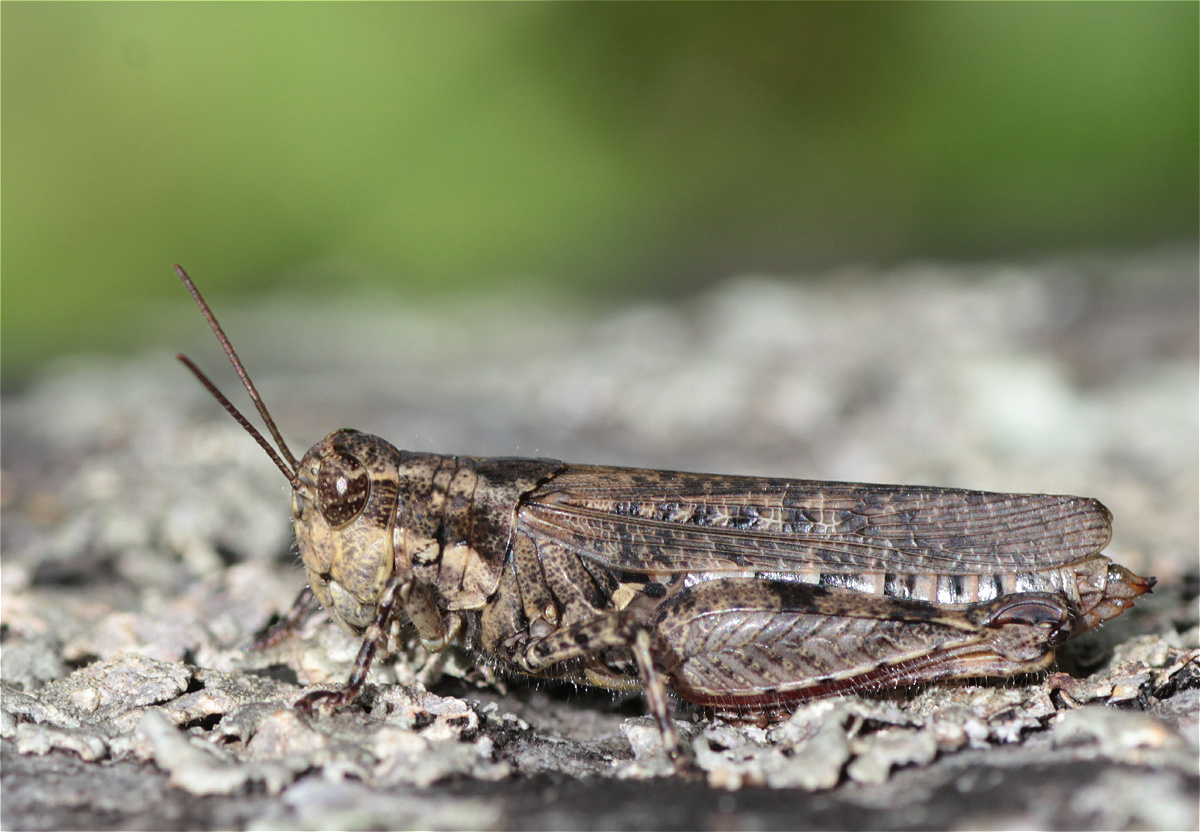
Baeacris punctulata, Ecuador

== Species ==
These nine species belong to the genus Baeacris:

- Baeacris bogotensis (Carbonell & Ronderos, 1973) (Colombia, Ecuador)
- Baeacris descampsi (Carbonell & Ronderos, 1973) (Colombia)
- Baeacris maquiritare (Carbonell & Ronderos, 1973) (South America)
- Baeacris morosa (Rehn, 1905) (Costa Rica)
- Baeacris peniana (Ronderos, 1992) (Bolivia)
- Baeacris pseudopunctulata (Ronderos, 1964) (Central and South America)
- Baeacris punctulata (Thunberg, 1824) (South America)
- Baeacris talamancensis Rowell & Carbonell, 1977 (Costa Rica)
- Baeacris tarijensis (Ronderos, 1979) (Costa Rica)
