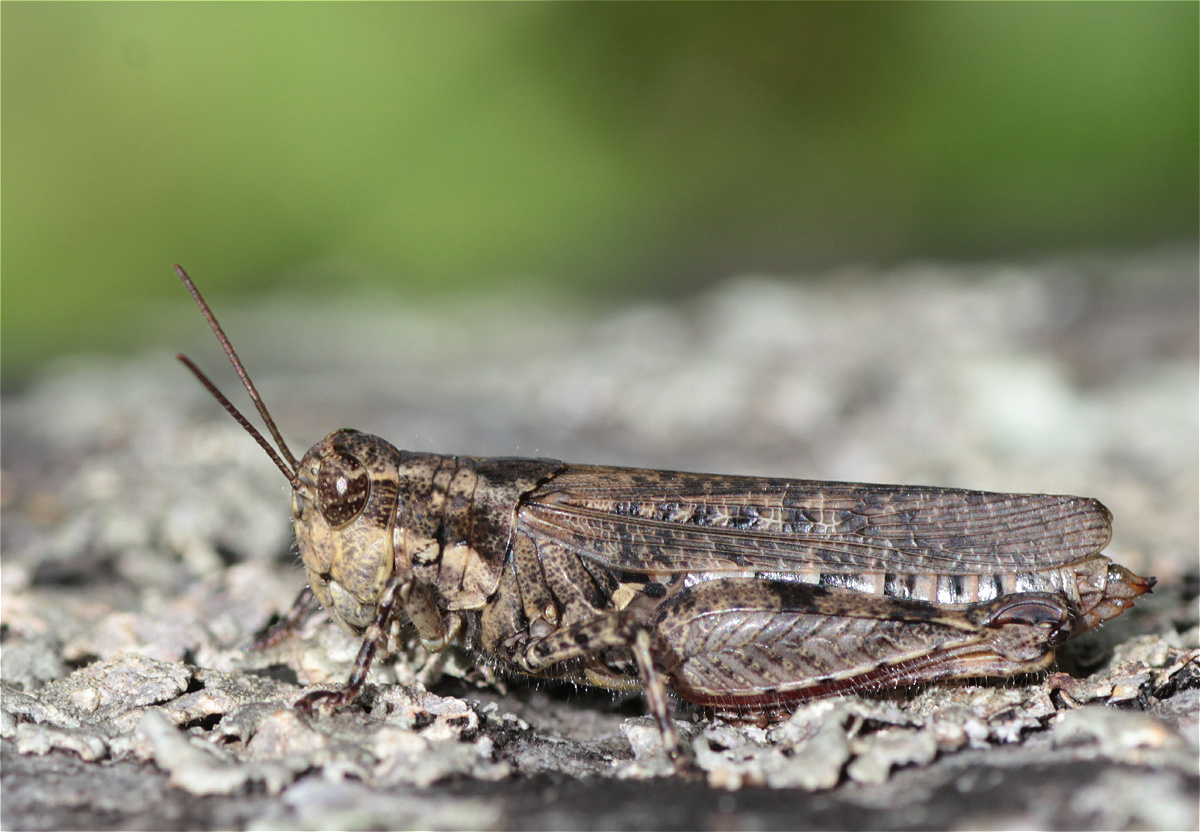
- Baeacris punctulata, Ecuador

Scientific classification
- Domain: Eukaryota
- Kingdom: Animalia
- Phylum: Arthropoda
- Class: Insecta
- Order: Orthoptera
- Suborder: Caelifera
- Family: Acrididae
- Subfamily: Melanoplinae
- Tribe: Dichroplini
- Genus: Baeacris
- Species: B. punctulata

Binomial name
- Baeacris punctulata (Thunberg, 1824)

= Baeacris punctulata =

Species of grasshopper

Baeacris punctulata is a species of spur-throated grasshopper in the family Acrididae. It is found in South America.
