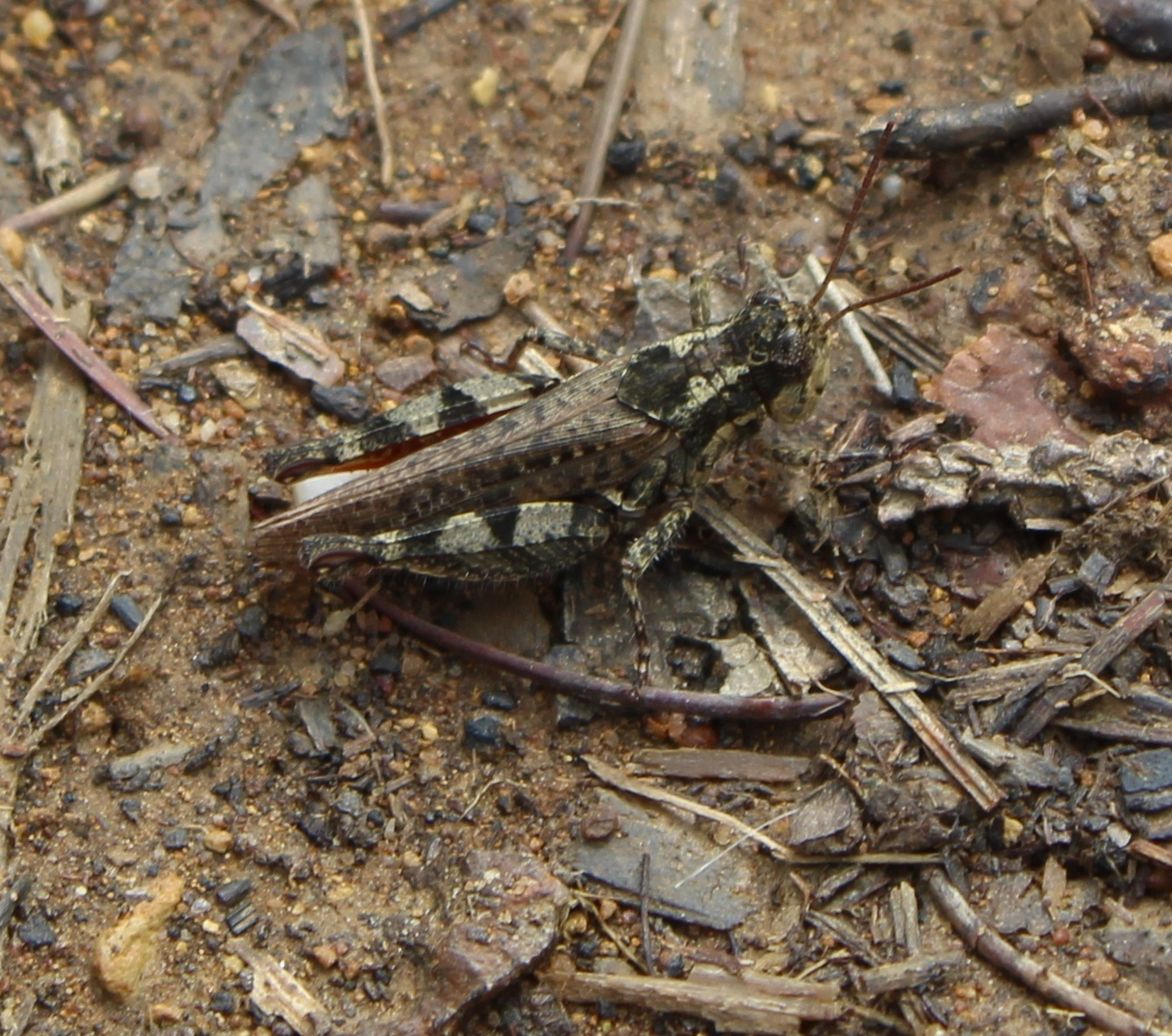
- Baeacris bogotensis, Colombia

Scientific classification
- Domain: Eukaryota
- Kingdom: Animalia
- Phylum: Arthropoda
- Class: Insecta
- Order: Orthoptera
- Suborder: Caelifera
- Family: Acrididae
- Subfamily: Melanoplinae
- Tribe: Dichroplini
- Genus: Baeacris
- Species: B. bogotensis

Binomial name
- Baeacris bogotensis (Carbonell & Ronderos, 1973)

= Baeacris bogotensis =

Species of spur-throated grasshopper

Baeacris bogotensis is a species of spur-throated grasshopper in the family Acrididae. It is found in Colombia and Ecuador.
