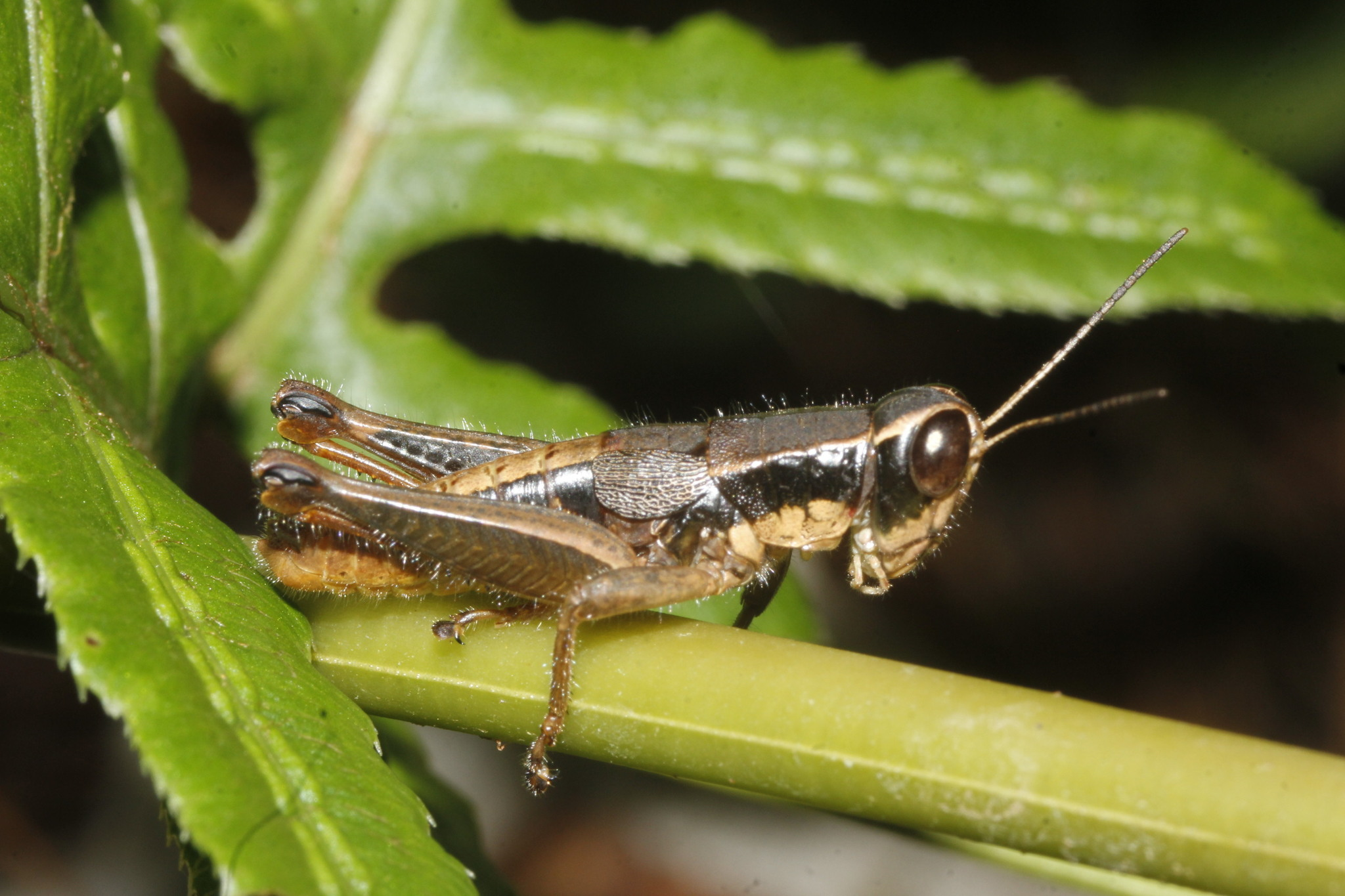
- Huastecacris truncatipennis, México

Scientific classification
- Domain: Eukaryota
- Kingdom: Animalia
- Phylum: Arthropoda
- Class: Insecta
- Order: Orthoptera
- Suborder: Caelifera
- Family: Acrididae
- Subfamily: Melanoplinae
- Tribe: Conalcaeini
- Genus: Huastecacris; Fontana & Buzzetti, 2007

= Huastecacris =

Genus of insects

Huastecacris is a genus of spur-throated grasshoppers in the family Acrididae. There are at least four described species in Huastecacris, found in Mexico.

== Species ==
These four species belong to the genus Huastecacris:

- Huastecacris alexandri Barrientos-Lozano, Buzzetti, Rocha-Sánchez & Méndez-Gómez, 2010
- Huastecacris fariensis Barrientos-Lozano, Medina & Rocha-Sánchez, 2009
- Huastecacris truncatipennis (Scudder, 1897)
- Huastecacris zenoni Fontana & Buzzetti, 2007
