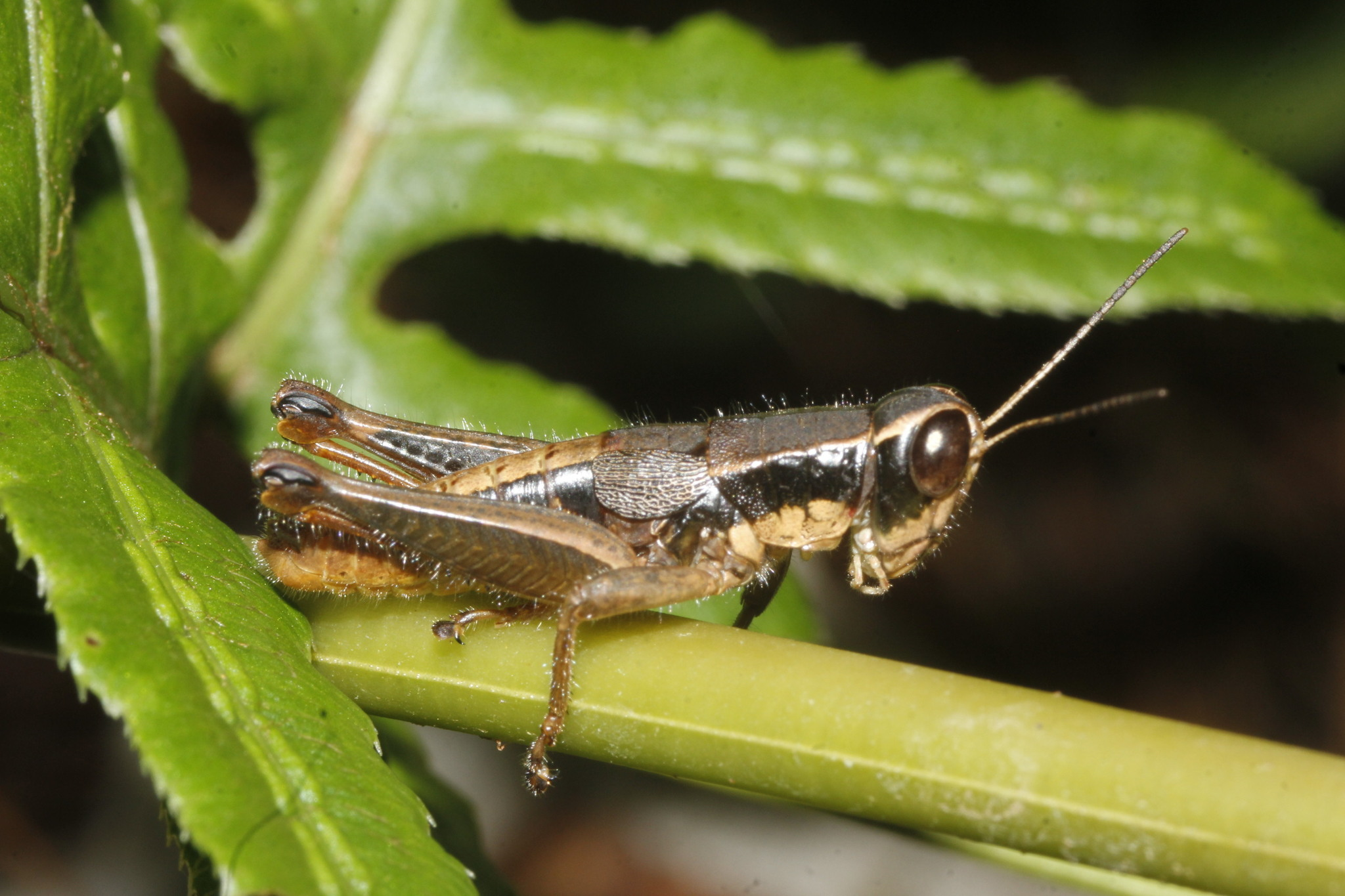
- Huastecacris truncatipennis, México

Scientific classification
- Kingdom: Animalia
- Phylum: Arthropoda
- Class: Insecta
- Order: Orthoptera
- Suborder: Caelifera
- Family: Acrididae
- Subfamily: Melanoplinae
- Tribe: Conalcaeini
- Genus: Huastecacris
- Species: H. truncatipennis

Binomial name
- Huastecacris truncatipennis (Scudder, 1897)

Synonyms
- Conalcaea truncatipennis, Scudder, 1897

= Huastecacris truncatipennis =

Species of spur-throated grasshopper

Huastecacris truncatipennis is a species of spur-throated grasshopper in the family Acrididae, found in Mexico.
